= 1900 in Italy =

- Decades: 1880s; 1890s; 1900s; 1910s; 1920s
- See also: History of Italy; Timeline of Italian history; List of years in Italy

Events from the year 1900 in Italy.

== Kingdom of Italy ==
- Monarch –
  1. Umberto I (1878–1900)
  2. Victor Emmanuel III (1900–1946)
- Prime Minister –
  1. Luigi Pelloux (1898–1900)
  2. Giuseppe Saracco (1900–1901)
- Population – 32,377,000

== Events ==
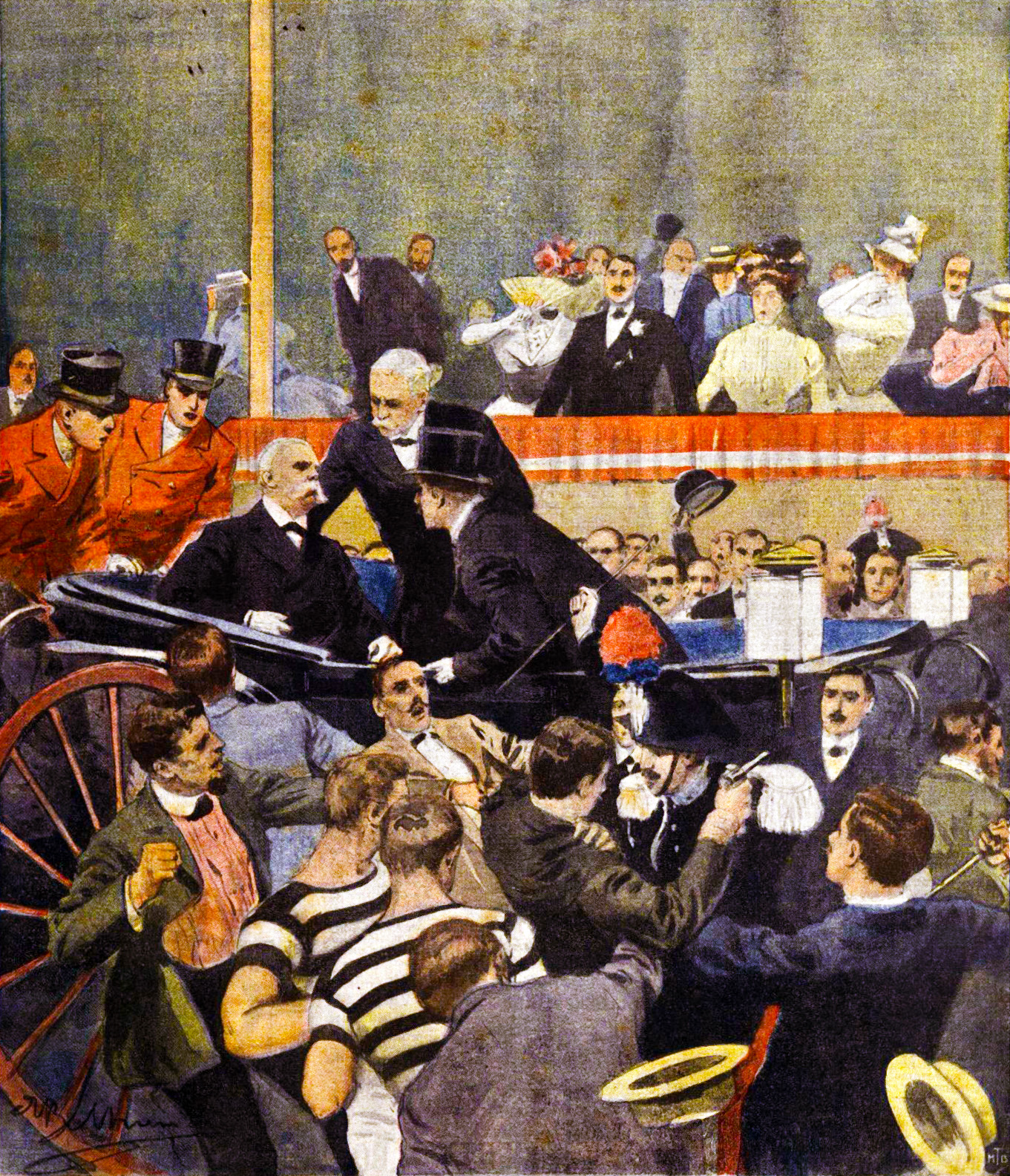
The killing of King Umberto I of Italy in Monza on July 29, 1900

The parliamentary year is dominated by an obstructionist campaign against the coercive Public Safety Bill introduced Prime Minister Luigi Pelloux the year before after the May 1898 bread riots, and the murder of King Umberto I.

=== January ===
- January 14 – Giacomo Puccini's opera Tosca premieres in Rome, Italy.

=== March ===
- March 29 – Uproar in the Italian Chamber of Deputies on procedural machinations by the Chamber's president to pass the controversial Public Security Bill. The Constitutional Opposition of Giuseppe Zanardelli joins the Extreme Left (Socialists, Republicans and Radicals). The next day the Extreme Left disrupts the session and the Chamber is adjourned.

=== April ===
- April 3 – When the right wing majority again tries to impose new procedures to curb debates on the new controversial Public Security Bill, 160 opposition deputies led by Giuseppe Zanardelli walk out the Chamber of Deputies, resulting in parliamentary deadlock. Parliament is adjourned until May 15.
- April 22 – First issue of L'Ora (The Hour), a Sicilian daily newspaper in Palermo, founded by the entrepreneurial Florio family.

=== May ===
- May 15 – The Italian Chamber of Deputies reassemble after an interval of several weeks since the adjournment that was occasioned by the obstruction of the members of the Extreme Left. Amidst continuous uproar the session is adjourned. Due to the continuous obstruction of his new coercive Public Safety Bill by the Socialist Party of Italy (PSI), supported by the Left and Extreme Left, Prime Minister Luigi Pelloux dissolves the Chamber of Deputies.

=== June ===
- June 3 – First round of the Italian general election.
- June 10 – Second round of the Italian general election. The Pelloux government fails to win a majority of seats. The "ministerial" left-wing bloc of the Historical Left led by Giovanni Giolitti remains the largest in Parliament, winning 296 of the 508 seats. The model of strong government advocated by the conservative Sidney Sonnino is discredited. More moderate politicians like Zanardelli and Giolitti resort back to more "conciliatory" politics.
- June 18 – Prime Minister Pelloux resigns.
- June 24 – Giuseppe Saracco forms a new government.

=== July ===
- July 29 – King Umberto I of Italy is assassinated by the Italo-American anarchist Gaetano Bresci in Monza. Bresci claimed to avenge the people killed during the 1898 Bava-Beccaris massacre. Umberto is succeeded by his son Victor Emmanuel III.

=== August ===
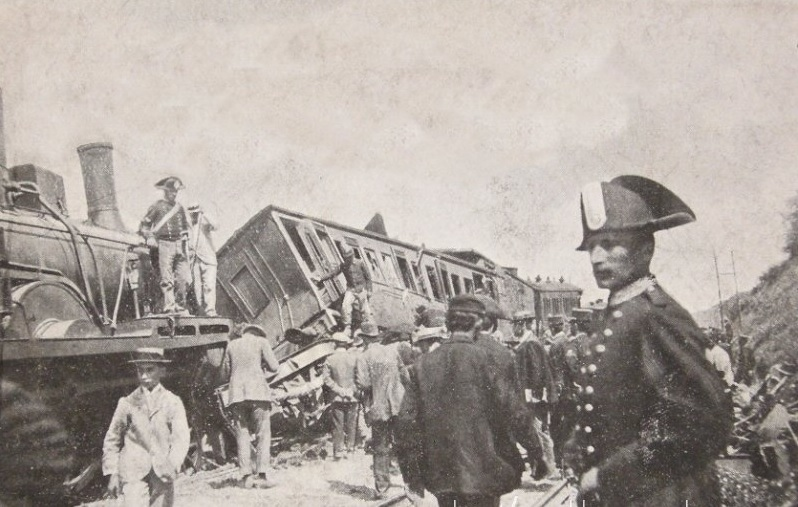
The Castel Giubileo train wreck

- August 9 – Funeral of King Umberto I; he was buried in the Pantheon in Rome.
- August 12 – Train wreck at Castel Giubileo along the Florence-Rome railway with twenty victims and a hundred injured. A failure to report a broken-down train, caused a rear-end collision. The crashed train was transporting the foreign delegations who had just attended the funeral of King Umberto I and the subsequent coronation of Victor Emmanuel III.

=== November ===
- November 8 – Prime Minister Giuseppe Saracco signs the decree establishing the Saredo Inquiry, officially known as the Royal Commission of Inquiry into Naples (Reale Commissione d’Inchiesta per Napoli), presided by senator Giuseppe Saredo, tasked with investigating corruption and bad governance of the city of Naples and to investigate how huge amounts of money that had been poured into Naples after the cholera epidemic of 1884 had vanished without noticeable benefit for the city's poor.

=== December ===
- December 5 – Germany, Austria-Hungary and Italy sign a treaty providing that their navies would work together in the event of an attack on either nation by France or Russia.
- December 19 – Port and shipyard workers in Genoa declare a general strike after prefect Camillo Garroni closed the Camera del Lavoro (Labour Exchange). Prime minister Giuseppe Saracco revokes the prefect's decision after personally negotiating with a working-class delegation. Twenty thousand workers participated in the strike, that ended on the 23nd. Saracco's handling of the strike brought him criticism from the Left for being too repressive and from the Right for being too permissive.

== Births ==
- January 1 – Paola Borboni, Italian film actress (d. 1995)
- February 18 – Guido Bedarida, Italian Jewish writer (d. 1962)
- March 11 – Alfredo Dinale, Italian Olympic cyclist (d. 1976)
- March 28 – Fosco Giachetti, Italian actor (d. 1974)
- April 14 – Salvatore Baccaloni, Italian operatic bass (d. 1969)
- May 1 – Ignazio Silone, Italian author (d. 1978)
- June 25 – Marta Abba, actress (d. 1988)
- July 3 – Alessandro Blasetti, Italian film director and screenwriter who influenced Italian neorealism (d. 1987)
- August 9 – Enrico Persico, Italian physicist (d. 1969)
- October 5 – Margherita Bontade, Italian politician (d. 1992)
- October 15 – Lauro Gazzolo, Italian actor and voice actor (d. 1970)
- November 29 – Nello Rosselli, Italian political leader, journalist, historian and anti-fascist activist in Giustizia e Libertà (d. 1937)

== Deaths ==
- January 9 – Francesco Cirio, Italian businessman (b. 1836)
- January 18 – Domenico Farini, Italian politician (b. 1834)
- July 29 – Umberto I, King of Italy (assassinated) (b. 1844)
- October 17 – Luigi Ferraris, Italian politician (b. 1813)
- November 10 – Luigi Centurini, Italian chess player (b. 1820)
- December 2 – Consalvo Carelli, Italian landscape painter (b. 1818)
- December 31 – Giuseppe Boccini, Italian architect (b. 1840)
