= Saredo Inquiry =

1901 corruption investigation in Naples, Italy

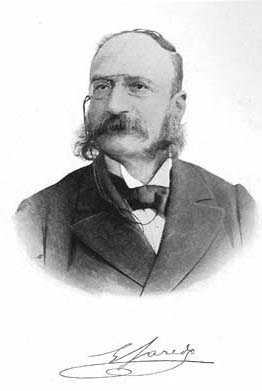
- Giuseppe Saredo
- Date: 1900-1901
- Location: Italy
- Participants: Officially known as the Royal Commission of Inquiry into Naples, presided by senator Giuseppe Saredo, president of the Italian Council of State. The Commission investigated corruption and bad governance in the city of Naples.
- Outcome: The inquiry unearthed a serious situation of corruption, clientelism and general inefficiency and an extensive political patronage system, the so-called "administrative Camorra" or "high Camorra"; the corrupt class of Neapolitan executives in charge of city governments between the 1880s and 1890s. The Saredo Commission's report discredited the Liberal politicians of Naples, who were voted from office in the local elections of November 1901.

The Saredo Inquiry, officially known as the Royal Commission of Inquiry into Naples ((in Italian) Reale Commissione d’Inchiesta per Napoli), presided by senator Giuseppe Saredo, president of the Italian Council of State, investigated corruption and bad governance in the city of Naples. The commission was established in November 1900 and published its findings in October 1901, painting a desolate picture of public governance in Naples. It brought to light a serious situation of corruption, cronyism, clientelism and general inefficiency.

== Background ==
In 1899 a new Socialist newspaper, La Propaganda, began a campaign against the rampant corruption in the city of Naples. The paper's main target were the Mayor of Naples Celestino Summonte, and Alberto Casale, a Liberal member of the Italian Chamber of Deputies and the local government power broker with extensive contacts in the Neapolitan underworld of the Camorra. As a result of the campaign, reform candidates such as the socialist Ettore Ciccotti and Domenico De Martino were elected in the summer of 1900 in the Vicaria, Mercato and Porto neighbourhoods, the previously unconquerable fiefdoms of Casale and his Camorra associates.

Casale, known as the "uncrowned king of Naples", accused the newspaper of slander, but in the criminal case that ensued, Casale transformed from an accuser into an accused. La Propaganda was able to prove corrupt deals and in particular a kick-back from the Belgian tram company Société Anonyme des Tramways Provinciaux (it), after a horse-cab drivers' strike in August 1893 against the expansion of the tram network. On 31 October 1900, the court acquitted the journalists and ordered Casale to pay the legal costs. The outcome of the Casale case reached the national government in Rome. Casale had to resign, the Naples city council was dissolved, and an official inquiry into the corruption in Naples was initiated.

== The Inquiry ==
On 8 November 1900, Prime Minister Giuseppe Saracco signed the decree establishing the Commission of Inquiry, under the presidency of the senator and law professor Giuseppe Saredo, to investigate how significant amounts of money that had been poured into Naples after the cholera epidemic of 1884 had vanished without noticeable benefit for the city's poor. A law for the redevelopment the city had been approved in January 1885 to improve the extremely poor sanitary conditions. The law provided the needed 100 million lire for the renewal of the city.

The radical transformation of the city, known as the risanamento, intended to improve the sewerage infrastructure and replace the most degraded and overcrowded slum areas, considered the main cause of insalubrity, with large and airy avenues. The Saredo Commission found that there was substantial evidence of waste and widespread corruption which converted the risanamento project from a public utility project to improve health conditions and prevent cholera outbreaks into a colossal private building speculation.

More generally, the inquiry unearthed an extensive political patronage system in the city of Naples, the so-called "administrative Camorra" or "high Camorra"; the corrupt class of Neapolitan executive in charge of city governments between the 1880s and 1890s brought to light by La Propaganda. The investigations of the Inquiry took place in a difficult climate, hampered by boycotts of the administrative staff of the Municipality that contrasted with the widespread public support. The paperwork was in chaos and official files had been lifted by staff to cover their tracks, while interviews with and testimonies of key people involved were half-hearted.

== Findings ==
The Commission published its findings on 21 October 1901, in effect an indictment of those responsible for governing Naples. It brought to light a serious situation of corruption, cronyism, clientelism and general inefficiency. Saredo's investigation rendered a harsh judgement, pointing the finger at the "tampering of the entire public administration for electoral purposes".

"I can attest that almost all the towns in the province of Naples, almost all the charitable organizations, are under the authority of criminal organisations; I add almost [so as] not to exclude the possibility of some exception," Saredo concluded. The inquiry identified a system of political patronage ran by what the report called the "high Camorra":

"The original low camorra held sway over the poor plebs in an age of abjection and servitude. Then there arose a high camorra comprising the most cunning and audacious members of the middle class. They fed off trade and public works contracts, political meetings and government bureaucracy. This high camorra strikes deals and does business with the low camorra, swapping promises for favours and favours for promises. The high camorra thinks of the state bureaucracy as being like a field it has to harvest and exploit. Its tools are cunning, nerve and violence. Its strength comes from the streets. And it is rightly considered to be more dangerous, because it has re-established the worst form of depotism by founding a regime based on bullying. The high camorra has replaced free will with impositions, it has nullified individuality and liberty, and it has defrauded the law and public trust."

The Inquiry introduced the terminology of "high Camorra", with a bourgeois character, but distinct from the plebeian Camorra proper (known as the Bella Società Riformata at the time), although both were in close contact through the figure of the intermediary (faccendiere). The Inquiry outlined the characters and functions of that peculiar social figure in the political-administrative reality of late 19th century Naples. Facilitators and intermediaries had always been active in Bourbon Naples as well. But now the new political and electoral organisation, with the extension of the vote, had consolidated the affirmation of clientele and the exchange between votes and services. This accentuated the possibilities and forms of corruption and renewed the centrality of intermediaries and fixers, who in Naples were known as the 'intermediate person' (interposta persona).

"From the rich industrialist who wants a clear road into politics or administration to the small shopowner who wants to ask for a reduction of taxes; from the businessman trying to win a contract to a worker looking for a job in a factory; from a professional who wants more clients or greater recognition to somebody looking for an office job; from somebody from the provinces who has come to Naples to buy some goods to somebody who wants to emigrate to America; they all find somebody stepping into their path, and nearly all made use of them."

However, whether the "high Camorra" was an integral part of the Camorra proper, is disputed. Although the inquiry did not prove specific collusion between the Camorra and politics, it brought to light the patronage mechanisms that fueled corruption in the municipality. The Camorra proper controlled elections by intimidation, blackmail and favouritism.

The so-called "low Camorra" or Camorra proper had established a well-organized protection racket and had the monopoly of the wholesale trade of every product entering Naples. The commission's report had looked into the meat trade. The Camorra ran the city's slaughter-house in the suburb of Poggioreale. Peasants, shepherds and drovers were obliged to pay protection money for their animals and to hire unnecessary labourers and accept fraudulent weights. Health regulations were ignored and taxes were never paid. Superannuated meat was sold as lamb or beef for highly inflated prices.

Regulations had been systematically evaded. The Saredo Inquiry painted a desolate picture of public governance of Naples. It was the city the most urgent health problems in the kingdom. However, less than 1 per cent of the city budget was spent on sanitation and hygiene. More than twice that amount was spent in Milan and Turin, where the needs were far less urgent. Saredo concluded that among all major Italian cities, "Naples more than any other is burdened by debt, and spends the least per resident on education, health and public works."

The Saredo study also painted a bleak picture of the effects of the risanamento with regard to the fate of the poor in the slums of Naples, where the 1884 cholera outbreak had been the most severe. Instead of being a project of social reform and health improvement, the risanamento became a vehicle of elite enrichment and political patronage, carried out at the expense of Naples' most vulnerable residents. Almost 57,000 poor residents were forcefully evicted from the slums with no clear rehousing plan, sparking criticism that public health was a cover for gentrification. The effects of risanamento were to make the problems of poverty and sanitation worse rather than better, and in 1911 the city was hit with another cholera outbreak.

== Aftermath ==
A direct result of the Inquiry was a trial in which Alberto Casale, former mayor Summonte and twenty-seven other people were brought to trial for corruption and complicity in corruption. Only twelve were convicted at the end of a trial that began in September 1902 and ended in August 1903. The harshest sentences were handed down to Casale and Summonte (three years and one month in prison, a fine of 1,000 lire and two years and nine months of disqualification from public office).

The Saredo Commission's report discredited the Liberal politicians of Naples, who were voted from office in the local elections of November 1901. However, the Rome correspondent of The Times said the Camorra had cast many votes for socialist reform candidates at the last minute and doubted whether the new municipal council would be able to destroy the influence of the Camorra. At the municipal election of June 1902, most Camorra-backed politicians were elected again.

== The role of Il Mattino ==
The Neapolitan newspaper Il Mattino of Edoardo Scarfoglio, acted as the mouthpiece of mayor Summonte, Casale and their men and blasted the inquiry. Scarfoglio had close friends among the "high Camorra" politicians, which paid for his yacht with a permanent crew of eleven. According to La Propaganda, Naples was ruled by the Casale-Summonte-Scarfoglio triad; the tip of a corrupt iceberg of officials, politicians and administrators. The director of Il Mattino launched frenzied attacks against the socialist newspaper and Saredo, who was described as an evil eye, and the inquiry was compared to a pestilential disease. The Saredo inquiry confirmed the corruption and revealed that Scarfoglio had received 10,000 lire from the Belgian tramway company.

== Sources ==
- (in Italian) Barbagallo, Francesco (2010). Storia della camorra, Rome: Laterza, ISBN 978-88-420-9259-9
- Behan, Tom (2005). The Camorra: Political Criminality in Italy, London: Routledge, ISBN 0-20399291-1
- De Grand, Alexander J. (2001). The Hunchback's Tailor: Giovanni Giolitti and Liberal Italy from the Challenge of Mass Politics to the Rise of Fascism, 1882-1922, Wesport/London: Praeger, ISBN 0-275-96874-X online edition
- Dickie, John (2011). Mafia Brotherhoods: The Rise of the Italian Mafias, London: Sceptre, ISBN 978-1-444-73430-0
- (in Italian) Di Fiore, Gigi (1993). Potere camorrista: quattro secoli di malanapoli, Naples: Guida Editori, ISBN 88-7188-084-6
- Seton-Watson, Christopher (1967). Italy from liberalism to fascism, 1870–1925. London: Methuen & Co Ltd. ISBN 0-416-18940-7.
- Snowden, Frank M. (1995) Naples in the Time of Cholera, 1884-1911, Cambridge: Cambridge University Press, ISBN 0-521-48310-7
