= 1899 in Italy =

- Decades: 1870s; 1880s; 1890s; 1900s; 1910s
- See also: History of Italy; Timeline of Italian history; List of years in Italy

Events from the year 1899 in Italy.

== Kingdom of Italy ==
- Monarch – Umberto I (1878–1900)
- Prime Minister – Luigi Pelloux (1898–1900)

== Events ==
The year is marked by the fight over a new coercive Public Safety bill introduced by Prime Minister Luigi Pelloux after the Bava Beccaris massacre in May 1898 in Milan. The Radicals and Socialist start an obstructionist campaign.

=== February ===
Prime Minister Luigi Pelloux

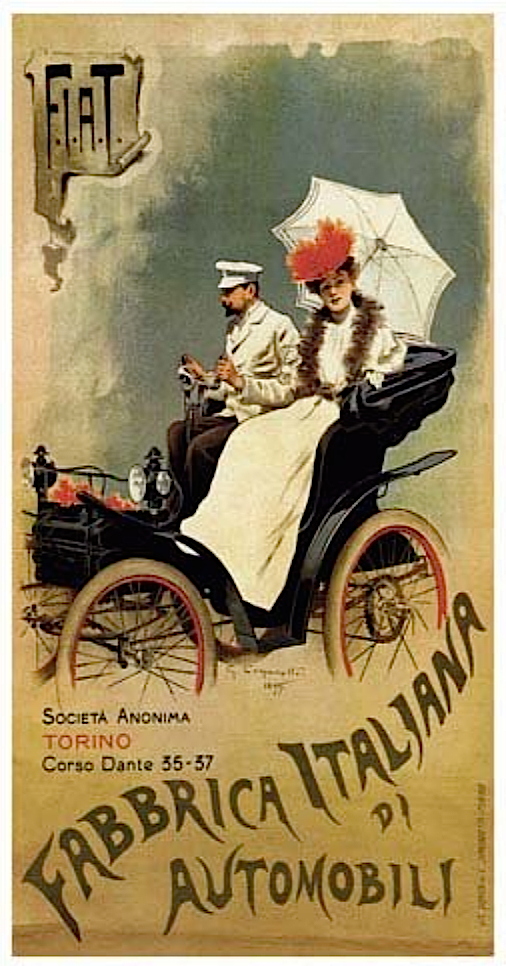
A 1899 FIAT advertisement by Giovanni Battista Carpanetto.

- February 4 – A new coercive Public Safety bill is introduced by the government of Luigi Pelloux and adopted by Parliament. The law made strikes by state employees illegal; gave the executive wider powers to ban public meetings and dissolve subversive organisations; revived the penalties of banishment; and preventive arrest for political offences, and; tightened control of the press by making authors responsible for their articles and declaring incitement to violence a crime. The Radicals and Socialist start an obstructionist campaign using the filibuster: points of order, endless speeches and other procedural delaying tactics.

=== May ===
- May 14 – Prime Minister Pelloux resigns over his Chinese policy. Italian Minister of Foreign Affairs Felice Napoleone Canevaro had demanded that the Chinese Empire grant it a lease for a naval coaling station at China's Sanmen Bay (known as "San-Mun Bay" to the Italians) similar to the lease the German Empire had secured in 1898 at Kiautschou Bay. China refused to comply and Italy had to withdraw its ultimatum, becoming the first and only Western power to fail to achieve its territorial goals in China. The fiasco was an embarrassment that gave Italy – still stung by its defeat at the hands of the Ethiopian Empire in the Battle of Adowa in 1896 – the appearance of a third-rate power. Pelloux and his fellow cabinet ministers stated that Canevaro had acted without informing them, and it was widely believed that king Umberto I was the one who had given Canevaro the orders to acquire a concession in China. Pelloux forms a new government, the most decisively conservative since 1876, without Canevaro.

=== June ===
- June 22 – Pelloux's patience with the obstruction to his public safety provisions snaps and he issues an unconstitutional royal decree. The decree was fiercely obstructed by the Socialist Party of Italy (PSI) and Extreme Left. More moderate politicians like Giuseppe Zanardelli and Giovanni Giolitti also join the opposition.

=== July ===
- July 11 – The automobile manufacturer Fiat, an acronym for Fabbrica Italiana di Automobili Torino, is established in Turin by a group of investors including Giovanni Agnelli. The company would become the major car making industry of Italy. The first Fiat plant opened in 1900 with 35 staff making 24 cars.

== Sports ==
- December 16 – Football club A.C. Milan is founded in Milan by English lace-maker Herbert Kilpin and businessman Alfred Edwards among others.

== Births ==
- January 1 – Randolfo Pacciardi, Italian politician, a member of the Italian Republican Party (PRI) (died 1991)
- January 23 – Carlo Betocchi, Italian writer (died 1986)
- March 8 – Giuseppe Bastianini, Italian Fascist politician and diplomat (died 1961)
- March 11 – Carlo Tamberlani, Italian film actor (died 1980)
- May 16 – Luigi Fenaroli, Italian botanist and agronomist (died 1980)
- August 20 – Tullio Cianetti, Italian Fascist politician (died 1976)
- August 30 – Domenico Pellegrini Giampietro, Italian Fascist academic, economist, and politician (died 1970)
- September 2 – Francesco Fausto Nitti, Italian journalist and fighter against Fascism (died 1974)
- September 28 – Achille Campanile, Italian writer, playwright, journalist and television critic (died 1977)
- September 29 – Ferruccio Ghinaglia, Italian Marxist revolutionary (died 1921)
- November 10 – Pietro Caruso, Italian Fascist and head of the Italian police during the final part of World War II who organised the massacre in Fosse Ardeatine (died 1944)
- November 16 – Carlo Rosselli, Italian political leader, journalist, historian and anti-Fascist activist (died 1937)
- November 22 – Gualtiero De Angelis, Italian actor (died 1980)
- November 29 – Emma Morano, Italian supercentenarian (died 2017)
- December 18 – Antonio Ligabue, Italian painter (died 1965)
- December 23 – Aldo Capitini, Italian philosopher, poet, political activist, anti-Fascist and educator (died 1968)

== Deaths ==
- January 15 – Serafino Dubois, Italian chess player (born 1817)
- May 8 – Giacomo Naretti, Italian architect (born 1831)
- May 20 – Carlotta Grisi, Italian ballet dancer (born 1819)
- September 28 – Giovanni Segantini, Italian painter (born 1858)
- November 17 – Achille Costa, Italian entomologist (born 1823)
- November 28 – Virginia Oldoini, Countess of Castiglione, Italian aristocrat, better known as La Castiglione, who achieved notoriety as a mistress of Emperor Napoleon III of France (born 1837)
- December 23 – Marietta Piccolomini, Italian soprano (born 1834)
