= 1897 in Italy =

- Decades: 1870s; 1880s; 1890s; 1900s; 1910s
- See also: History of Italy; Timeline of Italian history; List of years in Italy

Events from the year 1897 in Italy

== Kingdom of Italy ==
- Monarch – Umberto I (1878–1900)
- Prime Minister – Antonio di Rudinì (1896–1898)

== Events ==
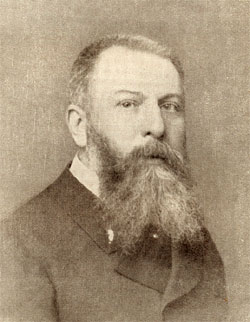
Prime Minister Antonio di Rudinì

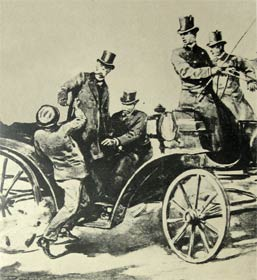
King Umberto I attacked by the anarchist Pietro Acciarito

In 1897 the wheat harvest in Italy was substantially lower than the years before; it fell from on average 3.5 million tons in 1891–95 to 2.4 million tons that year. Increasing wheat prices caused social unrest.

=== February ===
- 2 February – Despite the guarantees given by the Great Powers on the Ottoman sovereignty over Crete, Colonel Timoleon Vassos unilaterally proclaimed the union of the island with Greece. The Powers reacted by demanding that the Greek Prime Minister Theodoros Deligiannis immediately withdraw Greek forces from the island in exchange for a statute of autonomy. The demand was rejected, and on 7 February the first full-scale battle between Greeks and Turks occurred, when the Greek expeditionary force in Crete defeated a 4,000-strong Ottoman force at the Battle of Livadeia, Crete. The bold action of the Greeks excites popular admiration in Italy and sympathy with the Cretan Christians.
- 17 February – Vice Admiral Felice Napoleone Canevaro, commanding the Italian warships in Cretan waters, is chosen to command the combined naval forces of the Great Powers, as the senior admiral of the united fleet, known as the International Squadron. He warns Greece and Cretan insurgents to cease all hostile actions against the Turks.
- 21 February – Popular manifestations in Rome and other towns in Italy in favour of the union of Greece and Crete, which is under Ottoman rule.

=== March ===
- 16 March – An agreement for the construction of the careening dock and the shipyard Cantiere navale di Palermo was signed between the government and the Ignazio Florio Jr., scion of the wealthy Florio family, and shipowner and owner of the Navigazione Generale Italiana company, which provided regular services within Sicily and to the ports of Naples and Marseille. The financing of the work was divided between the Florio family (66%), the Italian State, the Municipality of Palermo and the Province of Palermo, as well as a small subsidy from the Cassa di Risparmio of Palermo.
- 21 March – First round of the Italian general election.
- 28 March – Second round of the Italian general election, 1897. The "Ministerial" left-wing bloc, led by Giovanni Giolitti remained the largest in Parliament, winning 327 of the 508 seats. The Di Rudini government continues.

=== April ===
- 5 April – 8 May – Greco-Turkish War over the status of the Ottoman province of Crete, whose Greek majority long desired union with Greece. Italian volunteers under the command of Ricciotti Garibaldi go to Crete to fight for the unification of Crete with Greece. Greece will suffer a heavy defeat and the Great Powers will force the Greek army to abandon the island.
- 12 April – After four days of debate Prime Minister Antonio di Rudinì survives a vote of confidence over the policy towards Greece in relation with the Cretan State.
- 22 April – King Umberto I is attacked by an unemployed anarchist ironsmith, Pietro Acciarito, who tried to stab him near Rome.

=== May ===
- 16 May – The Teatro Massimo in Palermo, Sicily, the third largest opera house—after the Palais Garnier in Paris and the K. K. Hof-Opernhaus in Vienna—was inaugurated with a performance of Verdi's Falstaff conducted by Leopoldo Mugnone.

=== December ===
- 5 December – Minister of War, General Luigi Pelloux, resigns over a conflict about army promotions. Prime Minister Di Rudini is tasked with forming a new Cabinet. The previous one was riddled with irreconcilable positions, Di Rudini now tries to form a more unified government.
- 14 December – Prime Minister Di Rudini forms a new Cabinet, which includes the Liberal Giuseppe Zanardelli as Minister of Justice.

== Sports ==
- 10 April – James Richardson Spensley opened the footballing section for the Genoa Cricket & Athletics Club, a cricket and athletics club formed by British expatriates, and was put in place as its first ever manager.
- 1 November – Juventus FC founded as Sport-Club Juventus by a group of young students from Turin.

== Births ==
- 21 January – Jole Bovio Marconi, archaeologist and prehistorian (died 1986)
- 27 February – Edmond Amateis, sculptor (died 1981)
- 15 June – Carlo Scorza, Fascist leader (died 1988)
- 25 October – Luigi Pavese, actor (died 1969)
- 5 December – Tina Lattanzi, actress (died 1997)
- 19 December – Vasco Ronchi, physicist (died 1988)
- 30 December – Alfredo Bracchi, Italian author (died 1976)

== Deaths ==
- 7 February – Galileo Ferraris, physicist (born 1847)
- 10 March – Teodulo Mabellini, composer (born 1817)
- 16 March – Bernardino Grimaldi, Italian politician (b. 1837)
- 27 March – Paolo Angelo Ballerini, prelate (born 1814)
- 20 August – Michele Angiolillo, anarchist (born 1871)
- 13 December – Francesco Brioschi, mathematician (born 1825).
