= 1895 in Italy =

- Decades: 1870s; 1880s; 1890s; 1900s; 1910s
- See also: History of Italy; Timeline of Italian history; List of years in Italy

Events from the year 1895 in Italy.

== Kingdom of Italy ==
- Monarch – Umberto I (1878–1900)
- Prime Minister – Francesco Crispi (1893–1896)

== Events ==
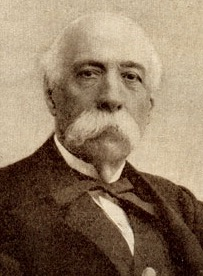
Prime Minister Francesco Crispi

In 1895 Luigi Lavazza started to roast his own coffee in a small grocery store in the Via San Tommaso 10 in Turin, eventually becoming the worldwide coffee brand Lavazza. Inventor and electrical engineer Guglielmo Marconi experiments with wireless telegraphy.

=== January ===
- January 13 – Battle of Coatit between Italy and Ethiopian proxies led by Tigrian warlord Ras Mengesha Yohannes in what is now Eritrea. It was the opening battle of the First Italo–Ethiopian War, and was a significant victory for the Italians, as they rebuffed an invasion force.

=== March ===
- March 25 – Italian troops occupy Adigrat in Ethiopia and use it as a base to support their advance south to Mek'ele.

=== April ===
- April 12 – Foundation of the Italian Republican Party (Partito Repubblicano Italiano, PRI) by Giovanni Bovio, Arcangelo Ghisleri, Napoleone Colajanni and Valentino Armirotti amongst others.
- April 24 – The Supreme Court decides that former Prime Minister Giovanni Giolitti cannot not be tried by an ordinary civil court, as Giolitti had argued since he had made his accusations against the involvement of current Prime Minister Crispi in the Banca Romana scandal in the Italian Chamber of Deputies. Only the Senate could hear the case. Giolitti had been accused of embezzlement of judiciary document as well as libel against Crispi and his wife, and had been summoned before the courts after the Public Prosecutor, sustained by lower courts, had started the prosecution.
- April 30 – The first Venice Biennale, I Esposizione Internazionale d'Arte della Città di Venezia (1st International Art Exhibition of the City of Venice), holds its first exhibition before growing into a major contemporary art exhibition that takes place once every two years (in odd years) in Venice, Italy. The exhibition is opened by the Italian King and Queen, Umberto I and Margherita di Savoia and would be seen by 224,000 visitors.

=== May ===
- May 18 – the first motor race in Italy is held. It is run on a course from Turin to Asti and back, a total of 93 km (58 mi). Five entrants start the event; only three complete it. It is won by Simone Federman in a four-seat Daimler Omnibus, at an average speed of 15.5 km/h (9.6 mph).
- May 19 – an earthquake hits Tuscany; four people are killed in Florence.
- May 26 – first round of the Italian general election. Crispi wins significantly.

=== June ===
- June 2 – Second round of the Italian general election. The "ministerial" left-wing bloc remained the largest in Parliament, winning 334 of the 508 seats in the Italian Chamber of Deputies, giving Prime Minister Francesco Crispi a huge majority. The constitutional opposition (Giolitti, Giuseppe Zanardelli, Antonio di Rudini and others) is reduced to 104; 47 radicals and 15 socialist are elected including Rosario Garibaldi Bosco, who is in prison because of the Fasci Siciliani revolt.

=== July ===
- July 24 – The Government decides to present the evidence of former Prime Minister Giovanni Giolitti about the role of current Prime Minister Crispi in the Banca Romana scandal and other matters – known as the "Giolitti envelope" –, to the Chamber of Deputies and have a special commission examine them. In June 1895, the French newspaper Le Figaro had published the package of documents compromising Crispi with evidence that he had concealed financial transactions and debts contracted by Crispi, his family and friends with the Banca Romana from the parliamentary inquiry in 1893.

=== December ===
- December 7 – Battle of Amba Alagi, the first in a series of battles between General Oreste Baratieri and Emperor Menelik. The defeat of the Italians shocked Prime Minister Francesco Crispi, who agreed to advance another 20 million lire to ensure that a disaster could be stopped.
- December 13 – The Chamber declines to indict former Prime Minister Giovanni Giolitti, who had asked to be brought for the Senate, as part of the Banca Romana scandal.

== Births ==
- January 16 – Rodolfo Lipizer, Italian violinist, professor of music, and orchestra conductor (died 1974)
- January 25 – Paolo Marella, Italian Cardinal of the Roman Catholic Church (died 1984)
- February 6 – Mario Camerini, Italian film director (died 1981)
- March 10 – Giuditta Rissone, Italian film actress (died 1977)
- March 14 – Renzo Provinciali, Italian lawyer and anarchist (died 1981)
- April 3
  - Mario Castelnuovo-Tedesco, Italian composer (died 1968)
  - Luigi Traglia, Italian Cardinal of the Roman Catholic Church (died 1977)
- April 10
  - Elena Aiello, Italian Roman Catholic professed religious (died 1961)
  - Giovanni Brunero, Italian professional road racing cyclist (died 1934)
- April 12 – Giovanni Panico, Italian Cardinal of the Roman Catholic Church (died 1962)
- April 15 – Corrado Alvaro, Italian journalist and writer (died 1956)
- April 19 – Antonio Locatelli, Italian aviator and journalist (died 1936)
- May 2 – Lando Ferretti, Italian Fascist journalist, politician and sports administrator (died 1977)
- May 6 – Rudolph Valentino, Italian actor and early sex symbol of the 1920s, known as the "Latin Lover" (died 1926)
- May 15 – Pietro Lazzari, Italian artist and sculptor (died 1979)
- May 30 – Simone Fernando Sacconi, Italian violin maker and restorer (died 1973)
- June 4 – Dino Grandi, Minister of Foreign Affairs and Justice, president of the Parliament of Italy, and member of the Grand Council of Fascism (died 1988)
- June 27 Anna Banti (born Lucia Lopresti), Italian novelist, art historian, and translator (died 1985)
- July 4 – Massimo Campigli, born Max Ihlenfeld, Italian painter and journalist (died 1971)
- July 13 – Rino Parenti, Italian fascist leader (died 1953)
- July 25
  - Maria Zamboni, Italian opera soprano (died 1976)
  - Gino Cavalieri, Italian film actor (died 1992)
- September 3 – Giuseppe Bottai, Italian lawyer, economist, journalist and Fascist (died 1959)
- September 28 – Stephen Ferrando, Italian missionary belonging to the Salesians of Don Bosco (died 1978)
- October 3 – Giovanni Comisso, Italian writer (died 1969)
- October 5 – Antonio Sacconi, Italian chess master (died 1968)
- October 6 – Nando Bruno, Italian film actor (died 1963)
- November 27 – Adolfo Franci, Italian screenwriter (died 1954)
- November 29 – Lodovico Rocca, Italian composer (died 1986)

== Deaths ==
- March 15 – Cesare Cantù, Italian historian (born 1804)
- April 7 – Ulisse Cambi, Italian sculptor (born 1807)
- June 22 – Amilcare Malagola, Italian Cardinal of the Roman Catholic Church (born 1840)
- September 21 – Silvestro Lega, Italian realist painter (born 1826)
- October 22 – Ruggero Bonghi, Italian scholar, writer and politician (born 1826)
- November 21 – Andrea Verga, Italian psychiatrist and neurologist (born 1811)
- December 17 – Antonio Carlo Napoleone Gallenga, Italian author and patriot (born 1810)
- December 22 – Melchiorre Delfico, Italian artist and a master of the Neapolitan art of caricature (born 1825)
