= Events of May =

Events of May may refer to:

- The student uprisings of May 1968 in France
- Barcelona May Days the fighting that broke out in Barcelona between the communists and their allies during the Spanish Civil War
- The Bava Beccaris massacre in May 1898 in Milan, Italy.
