= 1896 in Italy =

- Decades: 1870s; 1880s; 1890s; 1900s; 1910s
- See also: History of Italy; Timeline of Italian history; List of years in Italy

Events from the year 1896 in Italy.

== Kingdom of Italy ==
- Monarch – Umberto I (1878–1900)
- Prime Minister –
  1. Francesco Crispi (1893–1896)
  2. Antonio di Rudinì (1896–1898)

== Events ==
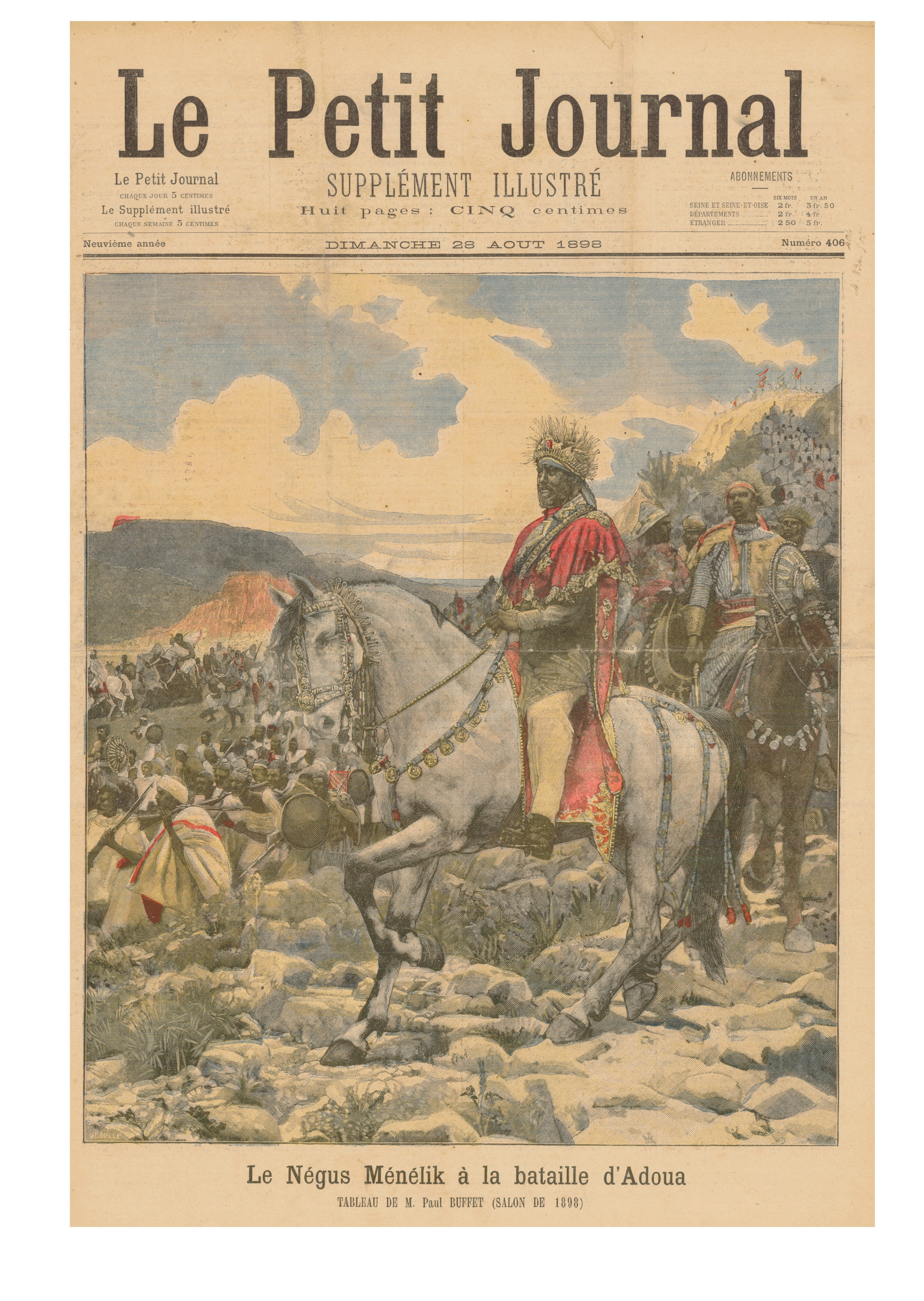
Menelik II at the battle of Adwa

In 1896, the Banco Ambrosiano was founded in Milan by Giuseppe Tovini, a Catholic advocate, and was named after Saint Ambrose, the 4th century archbishop of the city. Tovini's purpose was to create a Catholic bank as a counterbalance to Italy's "lay" banks, and its goals were "serving moral organisations, pious works, and religious bodies set up for charitable aims." The bank came to be known as the "priests' bank."

=== February ===
- February 1 – The world première performance of La bohème by Giacomo Puccini took place in Turin at the Teatro Regio and was conducted by the young Arturo Toscanini.

=== March ===
- March – The first Italian cinema screening by the Lumière brothers occurred in Turin.
- March 1 – The Battle of Adwa between Ethiopia and Italy near the town of Adwa, Ethiopia, in Tigray. It was the climactic battle of the First Italo-Ethiopian War, securing Ethiopian sovereignty and ending Italian attempts at its conquest for another three and a half decades. The Italians suffered about 7,000 killed and 1,500 wounded in the battle and subsequent retreat back into Eritrea, with 3,000 taken prisoner. Ethiopian losses have been estimated at around 4,000–5,000 killed and 8,000 wounded. When the news reached Italy, street demonstrations and rioting broke out in major cities.
- March 4 – The government of Prime Minister Francesco Crispi collapsed after the humiliating defeat of the Italian army at Adwa in Ethiopia during First Italo-Ethiopian War amidst Italian disenchantment with "foreign adventures".
- March 8 – Crispi is succeeded by Antonio di Rudinì as Prime Minister and Minister of the Interior in a cabinet formed by the veteran Conservative, General Ricotti, who retains the Ministry of War.
- March 13 – As the result of a pardon recognizing the excessive brutality of the repression of the Fasci Siciliani 120 prisoners are released, including the leaders of the movement Giuseppe de Felice Giuffrida, Rosario Garibaldi Bosco, Nicola Barbato and Bernardino Verro.

=== April ===
- April 3 – The first European sports newspaper La Gazzetta dello Sport was first published allowing it to cover the first modern 1896 Summer Olympics in Athens, Greece.

=== July ===
- July 12 – The government of Prime Minister Di Rudini resigns after a proposal of War Minister Ricotti to reduce army personnel.
- July 14 – Di Rudini reforms his Cabinet, getting support from Giovanni Giolitti and Giuseppe Zanardelli. Luigi Luzzatti becomes Minister of the Treasury and Luigi Pelloux Minister of War.

=== September ===
- September 30 – Italy and France sign a treaty whereby Italy virtually recognizes Tunisia as a French dependency.

=== October ===
- October 23 – The Treaty of Addis Ababa formally ended the First Italo–Ethiopian War on terms mostly favorable to Ethiopia. This treaty superseded a secret agreement between Ethiopia and Italy negotiated days after the decisive Battle of Adowa, in which Ethiopian forces commanded by Menelek II defeated the Italians. The most important concession the Italians made was the abrogation of the Treaty of Wuchale and recognizing Ethiopia as an independent country.

=== December ===
- December 25 – The first issue of Avanti!, the official voice of the Italian Socialist Party, is published under the direction of Leonida Bissolati. It took its name from its German counterpart Vorwärts.

== Births ==
- February 7 – Galliano Masini, Italian opera tenor (died 1986)
- February 11 – Bonaventura Tecchi, Italian writer
- March 24 – Gianna Manzini, Italian writer (died 1974)
- April 8 – Antonio Riva, Italian pilot and a World War I flying ace (died 1951)
- May 11 – Filippo De Pisis, Italian painter (died 1956)
- May 28 – Jone Morino, Italian film actress (died 1978)
- June 1 – Renato Ricci, Italian fascist politician (died 1956)
- June 6 – Italo Balbo, Italian Blackshirt (died 1940)
- July 14 – Ferdinando Giuseppe Antonelli, Italian cardinal (died 1993)
- August 16 – Tina Modotti, Italian photographer, model, actress, and revolutionary political activist (died 1942)
- September 2 – Rosetta Pampanini, Italian soprano (died 1973)
- September 25 – Sandro Pertini, Italian socialist and President of the Italian Republic from 1978–1985 (died 1990)
- October 11 – Cesare Andrea Bixio, Italian composer (died 1978)
- October 12 – Eugenio Montale, Italian poet, prose writer, editor and translator, winner of the Nobel Prize for Literature in 1975
- October 25 – Luigi Pavese, Italian film actor (died 1969)
- October 26 – Maria Zanoli, Italian film actress (died 1977)
- October 30 – Antonino Votto, Italian opera conductor (died 1985)
- November 19 – Bruno Migliorini, Italian linguist and philologist (died 1975)
- November 27 – Giovanni Battista Angioletti, Italian writer and journalist (died 1961)
- December 7 – Mario Benzing, Italian novelist and translator (died 1958)
- December 19 – Enrico Rastelli, Italian juggler and acrobat (died 1931)

== Deaths ==
- January 28 – Giuseppe Fiorelli, Italian archaeologist (born 1823)
- March 1 – Giuseppe Galliano, Lieutenant Colonel of the Royal Italian army who died in the Battle of Adwa (born 1846)
- April 30 – Antonio Cagnoni, Italian composer (born 1828)
- May 10 – Luigi Cossa, Italian economist (born 1831)
- June 4 – Ernesto Rossi, Italian actor and playwright (born 1827)
- July 12 – Giulio Ascoli, Italian mathematician (born 1843)
- July 18 – Adolfo Bartoli, Italian physicist (born 1851)
- July 19 – Achille Graffigna, Italian composer and conductor (born 1816)
- September 9 – Luigi Palmieri, Italian physicist and meteorologist (born 1807)
- November 14 – Italo Campanini, Italian opera tenor (born 1845)
- November 29 – Guglielmo Acton, Italian naval officer, admiral and politician (born 1825)
