= 1902 in Italy =

- Decades: 1880s; 1890s; 1900s; 1910s; 1920s
- See also: History of Italy; Timeline of Italian history; List of years in Italy

Events from the year 1902 in Italy.

== Kingdom of Italy ==
- Monarch – Victor Emmanuel III (1900–1946)
- Prime Minister – Giuseppe Zanardelli (1901–1903)
- Population – 32,787,000

== Events ==
Socialist trade unionism enjoys rapid growth in 1901–02. In 1902 nearly 250,000 industrial workers were organized in the Socialist national federations. The main labour organizations, the Camera del Lavoro (Labour Exchange) also expanded rapidly: from 14 in 1900 to 76 in 1902.

=== March ===
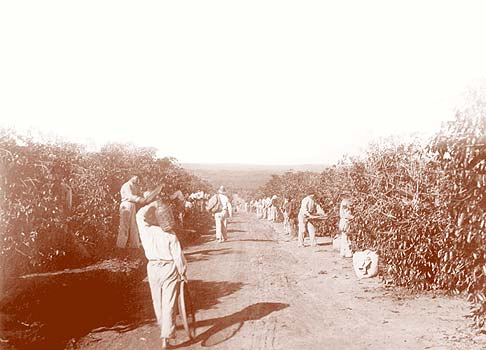
Italian emigrants on a coffee plantation in the early 20th century.

- March 26 – The Prinetti Decree is approved by the General Commissariat of Emigration suspending emigration to Brazil of all Italians not paying their own passage. The decree was named after the then Italian foreign affairs minister, Giulio Prinetti, and approved based on a report denouncing the poor living conditions experienced by Italian immigrants who had become virtual serfs on coffee plantations, with no medical care, no school for their children, small houses, no minimum hygiene conditions, and physical violence, even the use of whips.

=== May ===
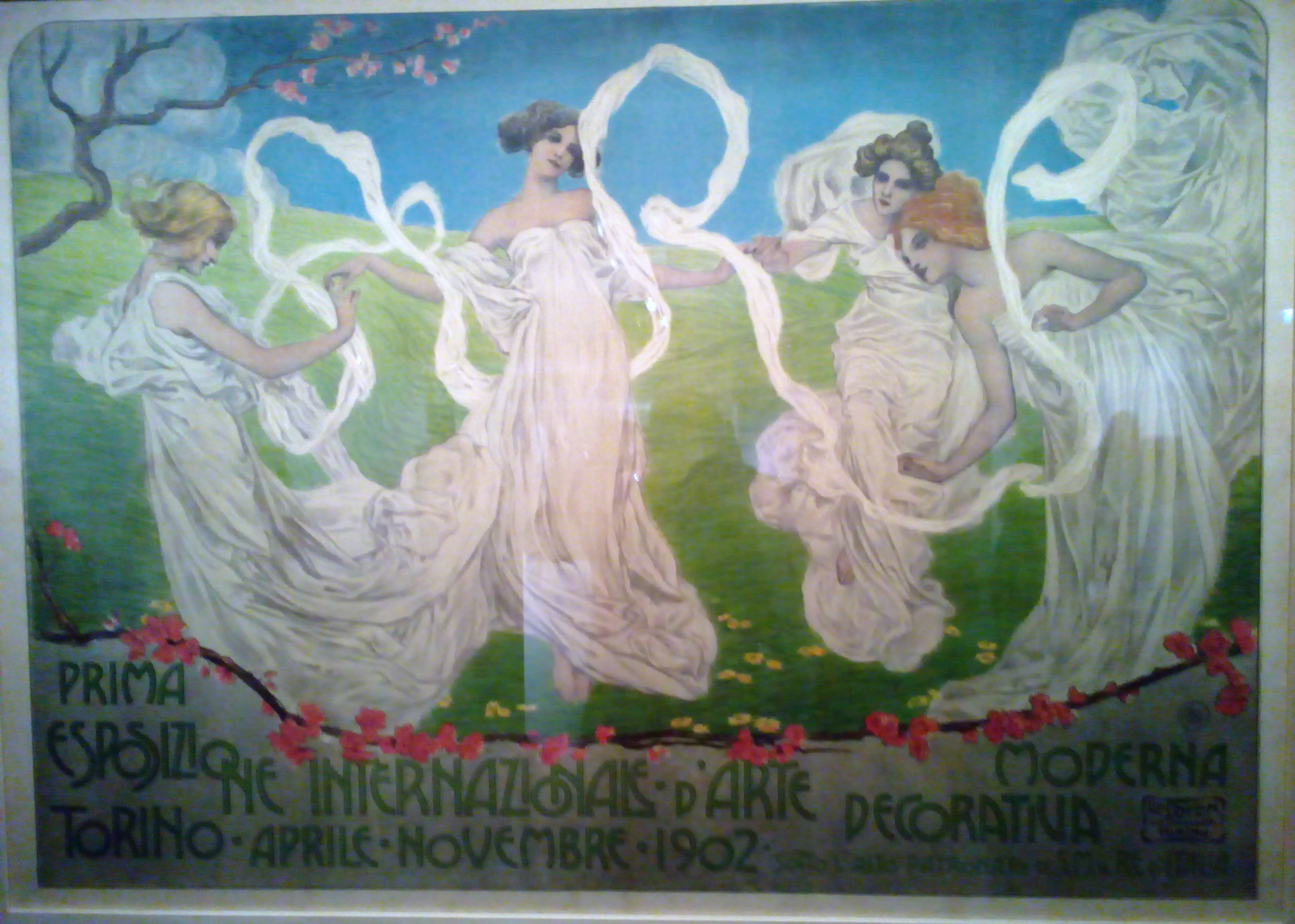
Poster International Exposition of Modern Decorative Arts

- May 10 – The Prima Esposizione Internazionale d'Arte Decorativa Moderna (First International Exposition of Modern Decorative Arts) opens in Turin, spreading the popularity of Art Nouveau design.
- May 20 – Italy annexes the town of Raheita on the Strait of Bab-el-Mandeb to Italian Eritrea after disturbances caused by the Sultan of Raheita.

=== June ===
- June 7 – Italy takes in possession its concession in Tientsin from the Chinese government. Foreign powers had obtained the right to station troops to protect their legations under the terms of the 1901 Boxer Protocol after China's defeat in the intervention to put down the Boxer Rebellion in 1900.
- June 28 – The Triple Alliance among Germany, Austria–Hungary, and Italy is renewed by Foreign Minister Giulio Prinetti.
- June 30 – Italy and France sign a secret treaty whereby France agreed to back Italy's claims in Libya (Tripolitania), while Italy supported French influence in Morocco. Italy was to remain neutral in case of German aggression against France, undermining the Triple Alliance.

=== July ===
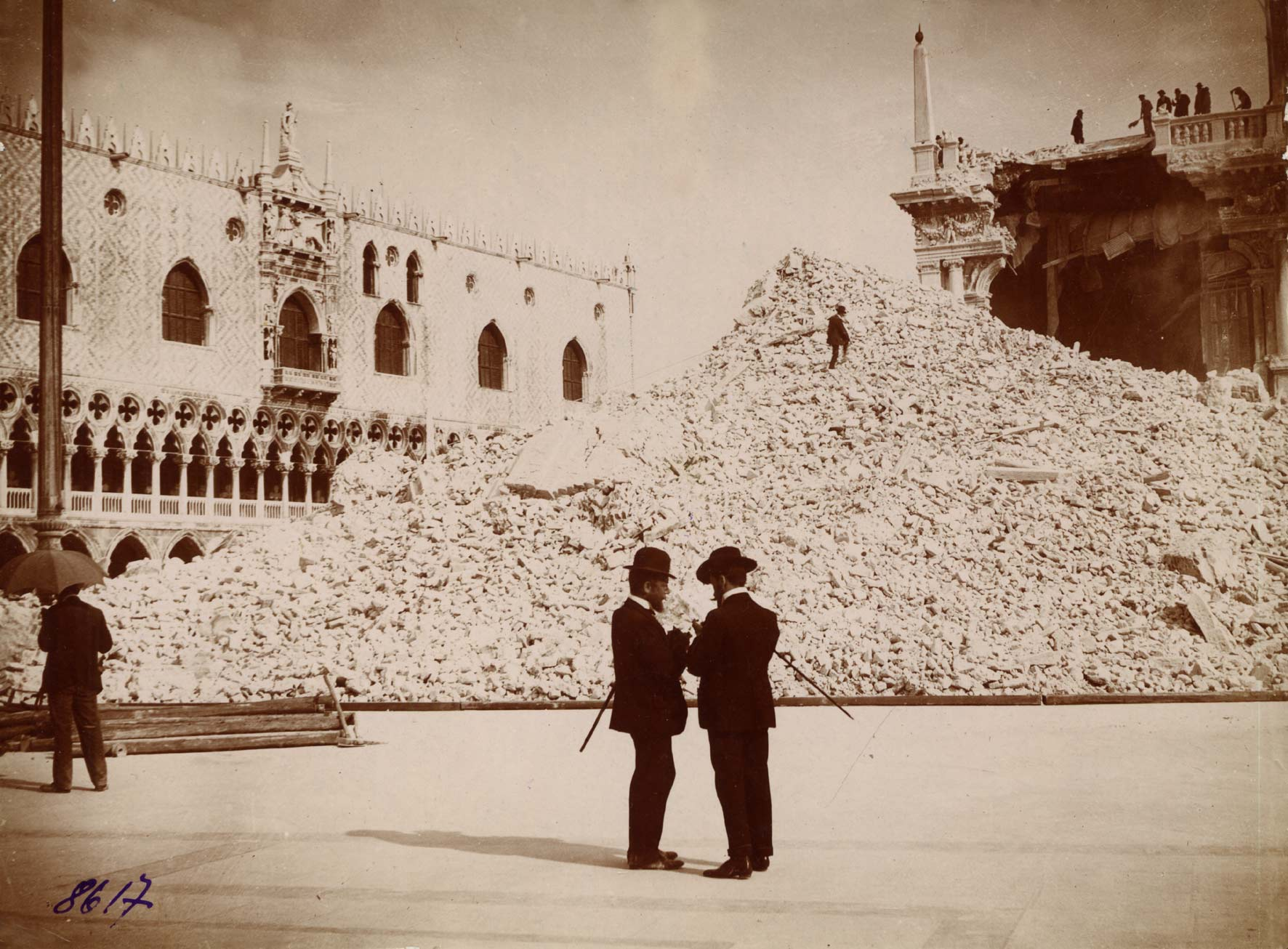
Ruins of the Campanile

- July 14 – St Mark's Campanile, the bell tower of St Mark's Basilica in Venice, one of the most recognizable symbols of the city, collapses.
- July 19 – Adoption of Law No. 242 of 19 July 1902 (it) (also known as the Carcano Law, named after its proponent Paolo Carcano, Minister of Finance). The law aimed at protecting women and children in the workplace. The law set the minimum working age at 12 years; banned dangerous or unhealthy jobs for minors under 15, as determined by a state commission; limited women's working hours to 12 hours per day with a 2-hour break; prohibited night work for underage women; and introduced maternity leave for the first time: 4 weeks of compulsory rest after childbirth, but no leave before birth. The actual implementation is slow and arduous.

=== August ===
- August 1 – The conviction of the former Deputy from Palermo, Raffaele Palizzolo, for the murder in 1893 of Emanuele Notarbartolo, former mayor of Palermo and former director general of the Banco di Sicilia, is hailed as a big blow against the Sicilian Mafia. The Assize Court in Bologna convicted Palizzolo and two others to 30 years of imprisonment.
- August 28 – King Victor Emmanuel III of Italy and Italian Minister of Foreign Affairs Giulio Prinetti make a state visit to Germany in Berlin.
- August 29 – General strike in Florence in support of a labour conflict at the Pignone iron works. Six thousands troops are called out to maintain order. With the exception of the metal workers of the Pignone iron works, most strikers returned to work on September 2.

=== September ===
Italian Prime Minister Giuseppe Zanardelli standing on a cart drawn by oxen during a visit to Basilicata in September 1902

- September 6–9 – Seventh Congress of the Italian Socialist Party in Imola. The progressive wing, led by Filippo Turati, prevails over the revolutionary wing, led by Arturo Labriola and Enrico Ferri. Turati supported the moderate liberal government led by Zanardelli and then (in 1903) that of Giovanni Giolitti, who in 1904 approved social legislation measures.
- September 8 – Five persons are killed and 10 wounded in Candela (Apulia) during a strike of 400 peasants over a dispute with landowners over wages. The strikers blocked all the roads in the area and the military was called out resulting in violent clashes that ended in troops firing at the strikers.
- September 14–30 – Prime Minister Zanardelli undertakes a journey through Basilicata – one of the poorest regions in Italy – to see for himself the problems in the Mezzogiorno.
- September 26 – A violent cyclone hits the east coast of Sicily. The town of Catania is flooded; 300 lives are lost in Modica. The Cathedral of Belpasso was partly destroyed burying worshippers in the ruins. 600 people were reported dead.

=== October ===
- October 13 – Two dead and fifty wounded in Giarratana, Sicily, during a confrontation between striking agricultural workers and the Carabinieri. That summer about 300 landless or low-paid agricultural workers had founded a Camera del Lavoro (Labour Exchange), demanding higher wages.

=== November ===
- November 10 – Bocconi University is founded by Ferdinando Bocconi in Milan.
- November 15 – Prime Minister Zanardelli presents social reforms, including a reduction of the tax on salt, partial abolition of the land tax for small holdings and exemption of income tax for workmen's wages, as well as a Divorce Bill.
- November 26 – In response the social reforms presented by the government, conservative opposition leader Sidney Sonnino introduces a reform bill to alleviate poverty in southern Italy. The bill provides for a reduction of the land tax in Sicily, Calabria and Sardinia, the facilitation of agricultural credit, the re-establishment of the system of perpetual lease for small holdings (emphyteusis) dissemination and enhancement of agrarian contracts in order to combine the interests of farmers with those of the land-owners.

=== December ===
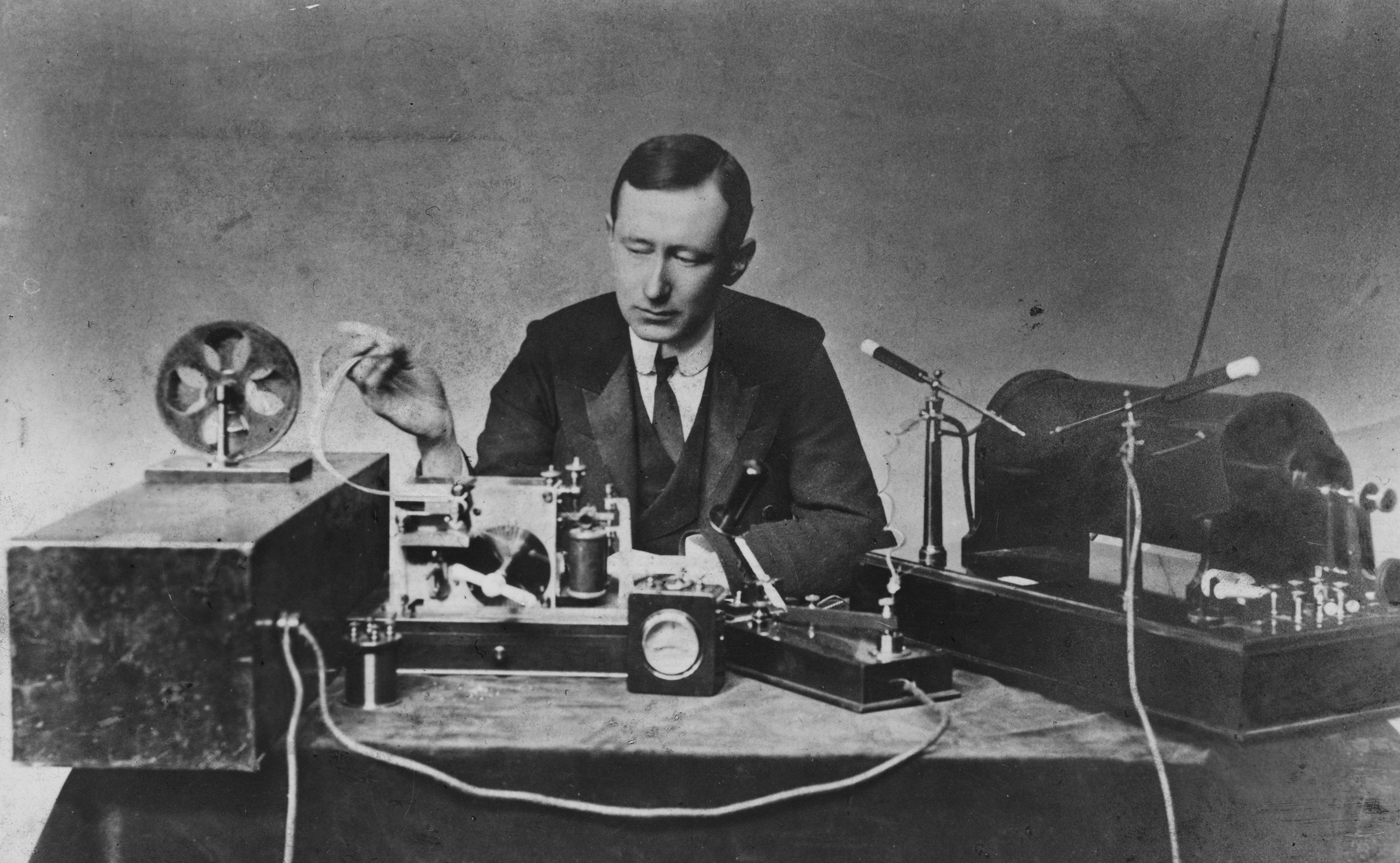
Marconi with the equipment he used in his first long distance radiotelegraphy transmissions.

- December 9 – Start of the Venezuelan crisis, in which Britain, Germany and Italy sustain a naval blockade on Venezuela in order to enforce collection of outstanding financial claims and President Cipriano Castro's refusal to pay foreign debts and damages suffered by European citizens in the 1892 Venezuelan civil war.
- December 17 – A transmission from the wireless transmitting station of the Italian inventor Guglielmo Marconi in Glace Bay, Nova Scotia, Canada, became the world's first radio message to cross the Atlantic from North America.

== Births ==
- January 3 – Tommaso Dal Molin, Italian aviator (d. 1930)
- March 15 – Carla Porta Musa, Italian essayist and poet (d. 2012)
- April 18 – Giuseppe Pella, Italian politician and Prime Minister (d. 1981)
- May 30 – Giuseppina Projetto, Italian supercentenarian, longest surviving person born in 1902 (d. 2018)
- June 11 – Pedro Biava, musician, composer, and teacher (d. 1972)
- September 20 – Cesare Zavattini, Italian screenwriter and one of the first theorists and proponents of Italian neorealism (d. 1989)
- November 29 – Carlo Levi, Italian-Jewish anti-fascist and writer of Cristo si è fermato a Eboli (Christ Stopped at Eboli) (d. 1975)
- November 30 – Maria Bellonci, Italian writer, historian and journalist (d. 1986)
- December 27 – Francesco Agello, Italian aviator (d. 1942)

== Deaths ==
- March 28 – Angelo Dubini, Italian physician (b. 1813)
- May 7 – Guido Boggiani, "pioneer of fieldwork" in Italian ethnology (b. 1861)
