= 1901 in Italy =

- Decades: 1880s; 1890s; 1900s; 1910s; 1920s
- See also: History of Italy; Timeline of Italian history; List of years in Italy

Events from the year 1901 in Italy.

== Kingdom of Italy ==
- Monarch – Victor Emmanuel III (1900–1946)
- Prime Minister –
  1. Giuseppe Saracco (1900–1901)
  2. Giuseppe Zanardelli (1901–1903)
- Population – 32,550,000

== Events ==
The year was characterized by a strike wave that brought down the government of Prime Minister Giuseppe Saracco in February. There were over 1,671 strikes involving 420,000 workers compared to 410 strikes and 43,000 workers in 1900. In 1901, there were over 1,000 strikes, involving 189,000 workers. There were many agricultural labour strikes in Emila and Lombardy.
With the return of Giovanni Giolitti into government as Minister of the Interior, "Italy entered a period of stable parliamentary government, without excitement or adventures; a period of social reforms and economic prosperity, during which popular discontent could be 'bought off', and the Catholic, Radical or Socialist 'subversives' could be integrated even further into the existing political system," according to historian Martin Clark.

=== January ===
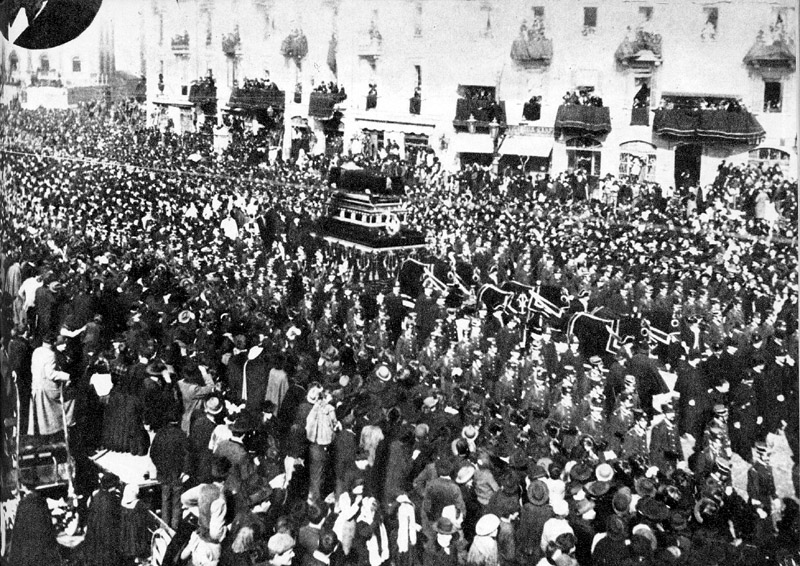
Verdi's state funeral procession

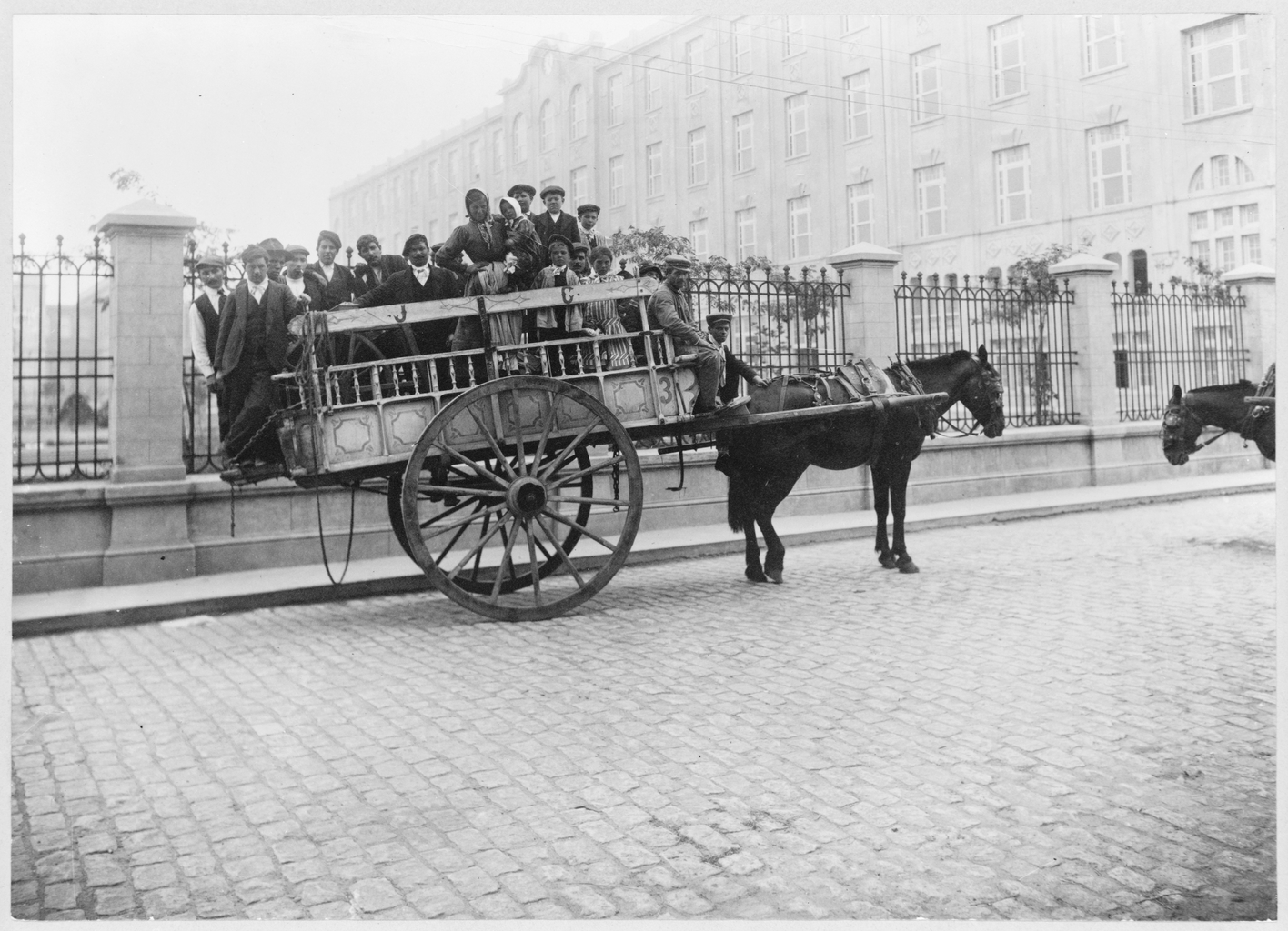
Italian immigrants aboard a cart at the Hotel de Inmigrantes in Buenos Aires (Argentina)

- January 18 – Pope Leo XIII issues the encyclical Graves de communi re on Christian Democracy.
- January 27 – Italian opera composer Giuseppe Verdi, who symbolized the country's unification movement, dies at the age of 87. While staying at the Grand Hotel in Milan, Verdi suffered a stroke. He was initially buried in a private ceremony at Milan's Cimitero Monumentale. A month later, his body was moved to the crypt of the Casa di Riposo per Musicisti. On this occasion, "Va, pensiero" from Nabucco was conducted by Arturo Toscanini with a chorus of 820 singers. A huge crowd was in attendance, estimated at 300,000.
- January 31 – A new emigration law (Law 23 of 31 January 1901) creates the Commissariat of Emigration, a technical organ under the Ministry of Foreign Affairs, to unify migration services hitherto dispersed among various ministries. The law of 1901 and subsequent legislation empowered the Commissariat to grant licenses to carriers, enforcing fixed ticket costs, keeping order at ports of embarkation, providing health inspection for those leaving, setting up hostels and care facilities and arranging agreements with receiving countries to help care for those arriving. The Commissariat tried to take care of emigrants before they left and after they arrived. The law was ratified with decree 375 of 10 July 1901.
  Seasonal migration had developed across the Atlantic: peasants from southern Italy went to work in the Argentina or the United States in November and returned in the spring for agricultural jobs in Italy. Most emigrants came back, but over 1.5 million Italians must have left their native country for good between 1901 and 1911.

=== February ===
- February 6 – The Government headed by Giuseppe Saracco is defeated in the Chamber of Deputies by a vote of 318 to 102 on the dissolution of the Camera del Lavoro (Labour Exchange) at Genoa in December 1900. The strike had been declared when the prefect had closed the Labour Exchange.
- February 8 – Prime Minister Saracco resigns by a vote of the chamber condemning his weak attitude towards the general dock strike at Genoa.
- February 15 – Giuseppe Zanardelli forms a new government with Giovanni Giolitti as Interior minister, that would last until 3 November 1903. Giolitti, who was considered to be the true leader of the cabinet, would dominate Italian politics until World War I, a period known as the Giolittian Era in which Italy experienced an industrial expansion, the rise of organised labour and the emergence of an active Catholic political movement.

=== March ===
- March 1–3 – Due to a crisis in shipbuilding in Italy, workers are laid off at the Palermo shipyard, the Cantiere navale di Palermo. A protest strike on 1 March gets completely out of hand the next day and turns into a popular uprising. The crowd blocks the operation of the tramways by placing obstructions on the tracks and cutting the overhead wires. On 3 March, a wave of arrests was unleashed as reinforcements arrived from Naples, Calabria and Catania. More than 300 people were arrested, including many workers.

=== May ===
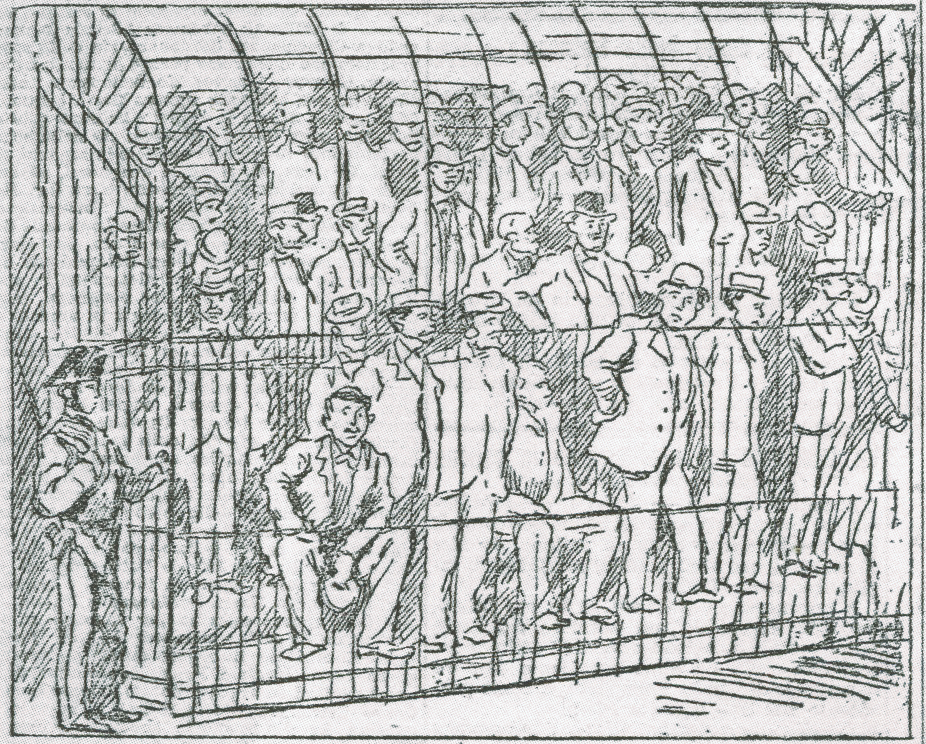
Sketch of the 1901 maxi trial of suspected mafiosi in Palermo. From the newspaper L'Ora, May 1901

- Start of a maxi trial against the Sicilian Mafia in Palermo: 89 defendants were in the dock charged with belonging to the criminal association, but after one month, only 32 defendants were found guilty of starting a criminal association and, taking into account the time already spent in prison, many were released the next day. The trial was based on the investigations of Palermo police chief Ermanno Sangiorgi.

=== June ===
- June 16 – The Italian Federation of Metalworkers (Italian: Federazione Impiegati Operai Metallurgici, FIOM), a trade union representing workers in the metal and engineering industries in Italy, is founded at a conference in Livorno. By 1902 it had 50,000 members. In 1901-02, the socialist trade union movement experienced rapid growth. Many new unions were formed, mostly as federations of existing local or craft unions. By 1902, nearly 250,000 industrial workers were organised in socialist national federations.
- June 21 – Interior Minister Giovanni Giolitti delivers a statement in the Chamber of Deputies about the agricultural crisis. As a result of government mediation 511 strikes involving 600,000 workers had been settled by mutual concessions.

=== August ===
- August 11 – Former Prime Minister Francesco Crispi dies in Naples at 7:45 PM after an illness of several weeks.

=== September ===
- September 3 – The new emigration law takes effect. Only from the ports of Naples, Genoa and Palermo, emigration is permitted.
- September 7 – The Boxer Protocol is signed in China's capital Beijing between the Qing Empire of China and the Eight-Nation Alliance after China's defeat in the intervention to put down the 1990 Boxer Rebellion. Italy is granted a concession in Tientsin from the Chinese government.

=== October ===
- October 9 – The popular Calabrian bandit Giuseppe Musolino is captured in Acqualagna, after his escape from prison in 1899.
- October 22 – The Royal Commission of Inquiry into Naples, presided by senator Giuseppe Saredo, that investigated corruption and bad governance in the city of Naples presents its report. The inquiry unearthed a serious situation of corruption, clientelism and general inefficiency and an extensive political patronage system, the so-called "administrative Camorra" or "high Camorra"; the corrupt class of Neapolitan executive in charge of city governments between the 1880s and 1890s. The commission was established in November 1900. The Saredo Commission's report discredited the Liberal politicians of Naples, who were voted from office in the local elections of November 1901.
- October 30 – The 5.5 M_{w} Salò earthquake shakes northern Italy with a maximum Mercalli intensity of VII–VIII (Very strong–Severe) causing some buildings to collapse.

=== November ===
- November 23 – The National Federation of Agricultural Workers (Italian: Federazione Nazionale fra i Lavoratori della Terra, Federterra), a trade union representing rural workers in Italy, is founded in Bologna, bringing together 758 local unions, with a total of 152,000 members, the vast majority in the north of Italy. It grew quickly, having 220,000 members by the end of 1902, and 900,000 by the end of World War I.
- November 30 – Finance Minister Paolo Carcano announces a surplus of 41,000,000 lire (US$7,800,000) for the past financial year and anticipated a surplus of 13,000,000 lire for 1901–02. Italy is the only great power in Europe in a good financial position.

=== December ===
- December 13 – Prime Minister Zanardelli delivers a statement in the Chamber of Deputies, in which he showed how the efforts of the Government had improved the health and material prosperity of Naples and the southern provinces, announced that he hoped to conclude commercial treaties with Germany and Austria benefiting Italian agriculture. He also announced the establishment of two railroad lines between Rome and Naples.

== Births ==
- January 4 – Salvatore Dell'Isola, Italian conductor (d. 1989)
- June 25 – Giovanni Barbini, Italian naval officer (d. 1998)
- July 7 – Vittorio De Sica, Italian film director and leading figure in the Italian neorealism movement (d. 1974)
- August 10 – Franco Dino Rasetti, Italian scientist, who discovered key processes leading to nuclear fission with Enrico Fermi (d. 2001)
- August 29 – Oscar D'Agostino, Italian chemist and one of the Via Panisperna boys, the group of young scientists led by Enrico Fermi (d. 1975)
- August 20 – Salvatore Quasimodo, Italian writer and Nobel Prize laureate (d. 1968)
- September 5 – Mario Scelba, Italian politician and Prime Minister (d. 1991)
- September 15 – Luigi Fantappiè, Italian mathematician (d. 1956)
- September 29 – Enrico Fermi, Italian physicist and Nobel Prize laureate, who created the world's first nuclear reactor (d. 1954)
- October 28 – Ambrogio Gianotti, Italian partisan and priest (d. 1969)

== Deaths ==
- January 27 – Giuseppe Verdi, Italian composer (b. 1813)
- April 8 – Giulio Bizzozero, Italian doctor and medical researcher (b. 1846)
- April 25 – Michele Coppino, Italian politician (b. 1822)
- May 22 – Gaetano Bresci, anarchist who assassinated King Umberto I of Italy (b. 1869)
- August 11 – Francesco Crispi, Italian statesman (b. 1818)
