= 1898 in Italy =

- Decades: 1870s; 1880s; 1890s; 1900s; 1910s
- See also: History of Italy; Timeline of Italian history; List of years in Italy

Events from the year 1898 in Italy.

== Kingdom of Italy ==
- Monarch – Umberto I (1878–1900)
- Prime Minister –
  1. Antonio di Rudinì (1896–1898)
  2. Luigi Pelloux (1898–1900)

== Events ==
- The year is marked by widespread bread riots all over Italy. The tariff on the duty on imported wheat is lowered from 75 lire a tonne to 50 lire. In 1897 the wheat harvest in Italy was substantially lower than the years before; it fell from on average 3.5 million tons in 1891–95 to 2.4 million tons that year. Moreover, import of American grain was more expensive due to the Spanish–American War in 1898. Wheat prices in Milan increased from 225 lire a tonne to 330 lire a tonne in April 1898. In order to try to diminish the rising prices the government of Antonio Di Rudinì was urged to abolish the duty on imported wheat. The lowering of the tariff is generally considered to be too little and too late. Street demonstrations demanding "bread and work" began in the South of Italy, which already had seen widespread revolts by the Fasci Siciliani in 1893–94. In towns like Bari and Naples rioting could be suppressed, while Florence was controlled by demonstrators for a whole day. The situation escalated when demonstrators were shot by nervous policemen, and rioting increased.
- The Finance Minister in the administration of Prime Minister Antonio di Rudinì, Luigi Luzzatti, passed two measures of social legislation in 1898. The industrial workmen’s compensation scheme from 1883 was made obligatory with the employer bearing all costs; and a voluntary fund for contributory disability and old age pensions was created.
- 'O sole mio the globally known Neapolitan song is composed. Its lyrics were written by Giovanni Capurro and the music was composed by Eduardo di Capua.

=== January ===
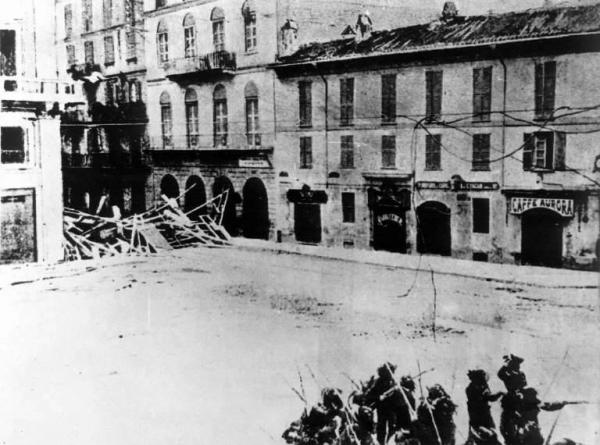
Barricades of the rioters and intervention of the military, Milan 1898

- 2 January – Bread riots in Sicily near Agrigento.
- 17–18 January – Two days of bread riots in Ancona after a demonstration of women demanding a reduction in the price of bread.

=== February ===
- 27 February – To annihilate the Sicilian Mafia, Italian troops arrest 64 people of Palermo. In a series of reports between 1898 and 1900, Ermanno Sangiorgi, the police chief of Palermo, identified 670 mafiosi belonging to eight Mafia clans that went through alternating phases of cooperation and conflict.

=== March ===
- 6 March – Felice Cavallotti, the leader of the Extreme Left, dies in a duel.

=== April ===
- 27 April – Bread riots start in Bari, where a mob of 2,000 attacks the tax office. The riots expand to many parts of Italy, with several people killed. In Naples, women lead the mobs carrying loaves of bread or red flags on long staves.

=== May ===
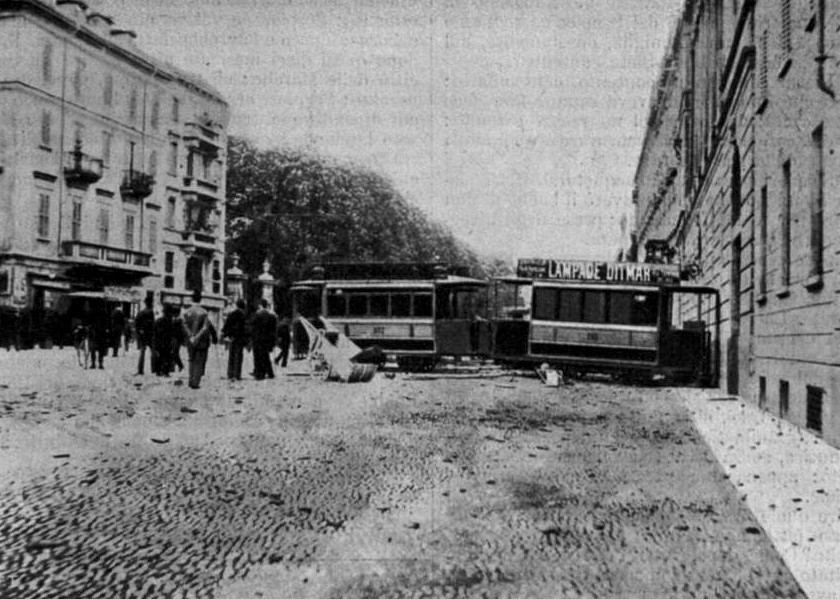
Barricade in the Corso Venezia, Milan, during the bread riots

- 7–9 May – Bread riots in Milan, Florence and Livorno, in which many people are killed. Martial law is proclaimed. The Bava Beccaris massacre, named after the Italian General Fiorenzo Bava Beccaris, quells widespread riots in Milan. On 9 May 1898 the troops used artillery to breach the walls of a monastery outside Porta Monforte, but they found inside only a group of beggars who had come to receive assistance from the friars. According to the government, there were 118 dead and 450 wounded. The opposition claimed 400 dead and more than 2,000 injured people. Filippo Turati of the Italian Socialist Party was arrested, accused of inspiring the riots. In July 1900, King Umberto I of Italy was assassinated by the anarchist Gaetano Bresci who claimed to avenge the victims of the repression and the offense given by the decoration awarded to General Bava Beccaris.
- 14 May – Bread riots continue in various areas in Italy, such as Naples and Pontedera, with several people killed.
- 28 May – Fall of the administration of Antonio di Rudinì following the May massacres in Milan. Indignation at the results of his policy against the uprisings in May left him without support of both the Left – who blamed him for the bloodshed – and the Right – who blamed him for the permissiveness that allegedly had promoted the uprisings and led to his overthrow.
- 28 May – Italian photographer Secondo Pia takes the first photograph of the Shroud of Turin, unwittingly taking the first step in the field of modern sindonology.

=== June ===
- 18 June – The recently reformed new administration of Antonio di Rudinì resigns.
- 29 June – Army general Luigi Pelloux forms a new government. He took stern measures against the revolutionary elements in Italy with a Public Safety Bill for the reform of the police laws, taken over by him from the Rudinì cabinet.

=== July ===
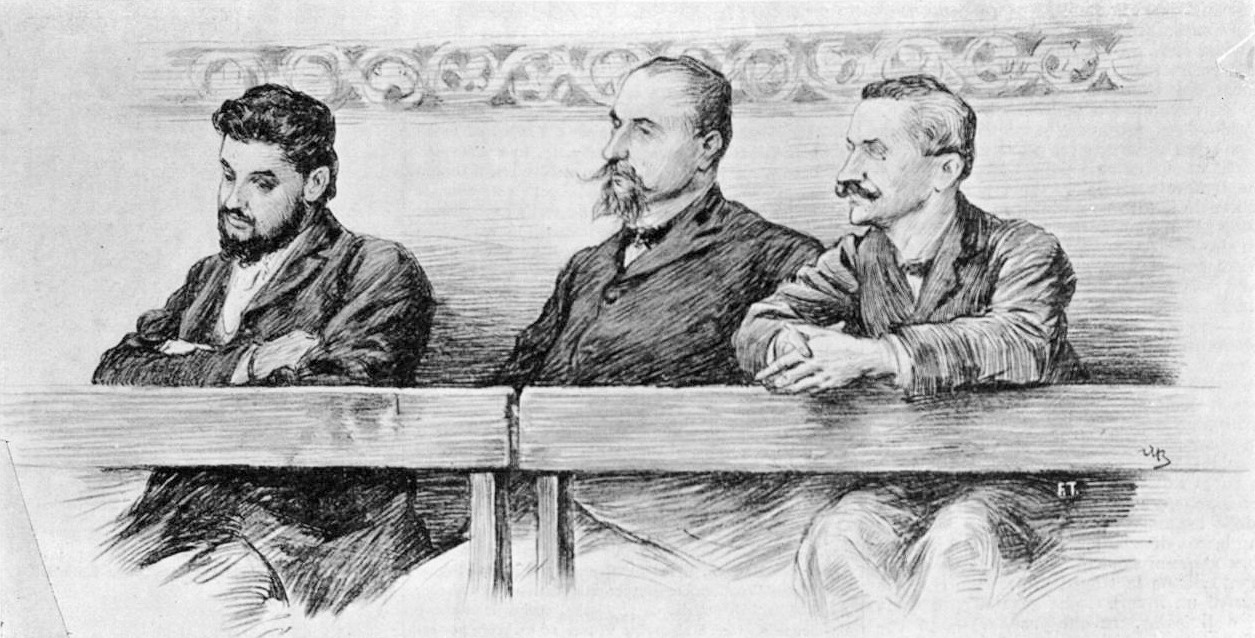
Filippo Turati, Oddino Morgari and Luigi De Andreis during the trial in Milan in 1898

- 27 July – Start of the trial against deputies Luigi De Andreis (Republican), Filippo Turati, and Oddino Morgari (both Socialists), who were charged with attempting to violently overthrow the state’s constitution and government by inciting civil war and contributing to the devastation and looting of Milan during the May 1898 bread riots. Although they were protected by parliamentary immunity, all three were arrested under the state of siege. The Chamber of Deputies later authorized the legal proceedings. On August 1, 1898, De Andreis and Turati were each sentenced to 12 years in prison, while Morgari was acquitted.

=== November ===
- 21 November – After two years of secret negotiations, a commercial treaty is concluded between France and Italy, granting mutually favoured treatment except for silk goods, which will remain subject to the maximum tariff. The treaty was seen as an important step to ease the long-standing tensions between the two countries.

== Sports ==
- 8 May – Genoa C.F.C. wins the first FIGC endorsed Italian Football Championship at the Velodromo Umberto I in Turin against Internazionale F.C. Torino.

== Births ==
- 15 February – Totò, Italian comedian, film and theatre actor, writer, singer and songwriter, nicknamed il principe della risata ("the prince of laughter") (died 1967)
- 18 February – Enzo Ferrari, Italian race car driver and automobile manufacturer (died 1988)
- 27 March – Titina De Filippo, Italian actress and playwright (died 1963)
- 8 April – Giuseppe Samoná, Italian architect (died 1983)
- 13 May – Justin Tuveri, Italian World War I veteran (died 2007)
- 5 June – Salvatore Ferragamo, Italian shoe designer (died 1960)
- 9 June – Curzio Malaparte, born Kurt Erich Suckert, Italian journalist, dramatist, short-story writer, and novelist (died 1957)
- 24 July – Giuseppe Giovanni Pietro Alberganti, Italian worker, trade unionist, antifascist, partisan and politician (died 1980)
- 4 August – Ernesto Maserati, Italian automotive engineer and racer (died 1975)
- 5 August – Piero Sraffa, Italian economist (died 1983)
- 10 August – Mario Radice, Italian painter (died 1987)
- 2 September – Pietro Ferrero, the founder of Ferrero SpA, an Italian confectionery and chocolatier company (died 1949)
- 19 September – Giuseppe Saragat, Italian politician and President of the Italian Republic from 1964–1971 (died 1988)
- 27 September – Valentino Bompiani, Italian publisher, writer and playwright (died 1992)
- 28 September – Baconin Borzacchini, Italian Grand Prix motor racing driver (died 1933)
- 14 October – Francesco Maugeri, Italian admiral, head of the Servizio Informazioni Segrete during World War II (died 1978)
- 21 October – Prince Amedeo, Duke of Aosta, Italian Viceroy of Italian East Africa During World War II (died 1942)
- 30 November – Mario Mattoli, Italian film director and screenwriter (died 1980)

== Deaths ==
- 6 March – Felice Cavallotti, Italian politician, poet and dramatic author (born 1842)
- 24 May – Benedetto Brin, Italian naval administrator and politician (born 1833)
- 16 September – Giuseppe Gibelli, Italian botanist and lichenologist (born 1831)
- 25 November – Franco Tosi, Italian engineer (born 1850)
