= Tramontano =

Tramontano is a surname. Notable people with the surname include:

- Aldo Tramontano (born 1981), Italian rower
- Anna Tramontano (1957–2017), Italian computational biologist
- Giulia Tramontano (1994–2023), Italian murder victim

== See also ==
- Castello Tramontano, a 16th-century fortification in Matera
