= Margherita Bontade =

Italian politician (1900–1992)

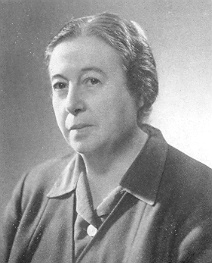
Margherita Bontade

Margherita Bontade (5 October 1900 – 4 June 1992) was an Italian politician.

Bontade was born in Palermo. She represented the Christian Democracy in the Chamber of Deputies from 1948 to 1968.
