= 1893 in Italy =

- Decades: 1870s; 1880s; 1890s; 1900s; 1910s
- See also: History of Italy; Timeline of Italian history; List of years in Italy

Events from the year 1893 in Italy.

== Kingdom of Italy ==
- Monarch – Umberto I (1878–1900)
- Prime Minister –
  1. Giovanni Giolitti (1892–1893)
  2. Francesco Crispi (1893–1896)

== Events ==
The year is characterized by the Banca Romana scandal, discrediting the whole political system, and increasing violence in Sicily as a result of the Fasci Siciliani (Sicilian Leagues), a popular movement of democratic and socialist inspiration in 1891–1894.

=== January ===
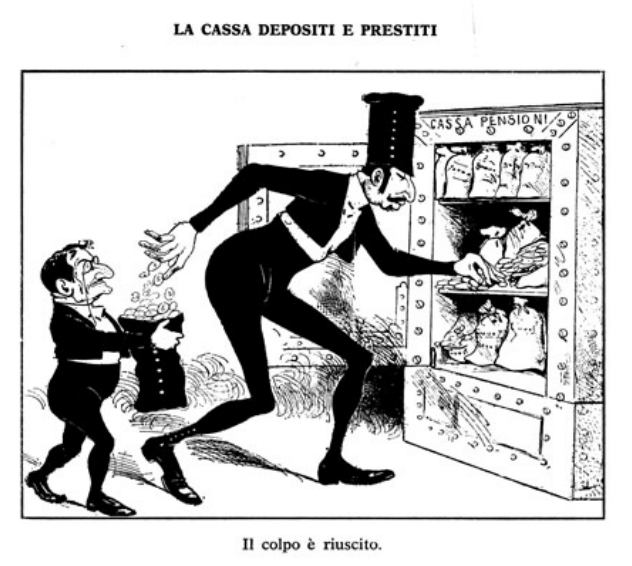
Cartoon in the satirical magazine L'Asino (The Donkey) in June 1893, with Giolitti (right) and Tanlongo (left). "Savings and loans: the coup succeeded." (L'Asino, June 11, 1893)

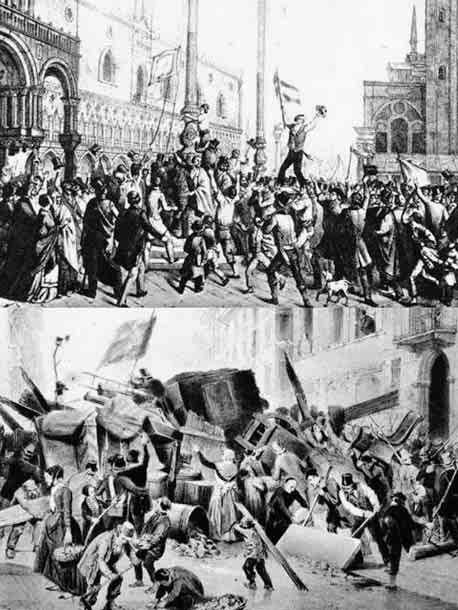
Prints reproducing the massacre at Lercara Friddi in December 1893 during the Fasci Siciliani revolt

- January 18 – An official report confirms the serious state of affairs in the Banca Romana: a deficiency of cash, cooked accounts, a note circulation of 135 million lire instead of the 75 million permitted by law, a great quantity of bad debts due to building speculation. The next day the governor of the bank, Bernardo Tanlongo, and several of his subordinates are arrested.
- January 20 – Caltavuturo massacre in Caltavuturo in the Province of Palermo (Sicily), where local authorities killed 13 and wounded 21 peasants that occupied communal land they claimed was theirs. The claim for land reform was one of the demands of the Fasci Siciliani.

=== February ===
- February 1 – Murder of Emanuele Notarbartolo, former mayor of Palermo and former director general of the Banco di Sicilia by the Sicilian Mafia. Raffaele Palizzolo, a member of the Italian Chamber of Deputies, was regarded as the mastermind of the assassination. The series of trials over the following decade split Sicilian society in two and astonished public opinion. The conviction of Palizzolo in August 1902, would be hailed as a big blow against the Mafia. The Assize Court in Bologna convicted Palizzolo and two others to 30 years of imprisonment.

=== March ===
- March 20 – Prime Minister Giovanni Giolitti presents a bill to reorganize the banking system.
- March 21 – Due to the Banca Romana scandal, the Chamber of Deputy's approves a proposal to establish a Commission of Inquiry on banks.

=== May ===
- May 21–22 – Congress of the Fasci Siciliani in Palermo attended by 500 delegates from nearly 90 leagues and socialist circles.
- May 22 – The President of the Italian Chamber of Deputies, Giuseppe Zanardelli, urges King Umberto I not to accept the resignation of Giolitti. Giolitti agrees to reconstruct the government with Senator Gagliardo as Finance Minister.

=== July ===
- 31 July – A peasant conference at Corleone drafted model agrarian contracts for labourers, sharecroppers and tenants and presented them to the landowners. When those refused to negotiate, a strike against landowners and against state taxes broke out over a large part of western Sicily. The so-called Patti di Corleone (Corleone Covenants), are considered by historians to be the first trade union collective contract in capitalist Italy.

=== August ===
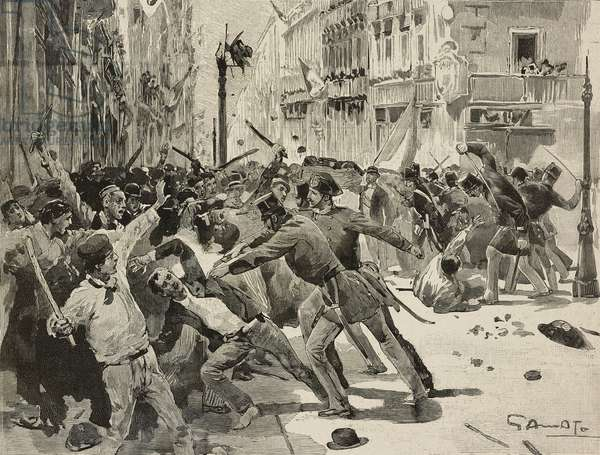
Child killed during coachmen strike of August 24, 1893, carried into procession, clashes with police, Naples, Italy

- August 10 – A new Bank Act liquidates the Banca Romana and reforms the whole system of note issue, restricting the privilege to the new Banca d'Italia – mandated to liquidate the Banca Romana – and to the Banco di Napoli and the Banco di Sicilia, and providing for stricter state control.
- August 16–17 – Massacre of Italian workers of the Compagnie des Salins du Midi in Aigues-Mortes (France) by French villagers and workers. The New York Times, reporting from the trial of ringleaders later in the year, reported that "ten men were killed and twenty-six wounded". Anti-French riots erupt in Italy. In Rome the windows of the French Embassy were smashed and for a while the angry mob seemed to get out of hand.
- August 23 – Start of a three-day popular revolt in Naples incited by horse-cab drivers notoriously linked to the Camorra, who called for a strike against the agreement between the city administration and the Belgian tram company Société Anonyme des Tramways Provinciaux (it), which provides for the extension of the tramway line to other parts of the city. The coachmen created riots and wreak havoc on the streets of Naples together with thousands of other demonstrators descending from the working-class neighbourhoods. Carriages that did not participate in the strike were attacked and a tram was burnt down. The police fired on the demonstrators, injuring some of them and killing a boy. His corpse is carried in a tumultuous procession and continuous clashes with the police, from San Carlo all'Arena to the Prefecture. The riot spreads, shops are attacked, shop windows smashed. Devastations multiply, but do not result in looting.

=== September ===
- September 8 – While in Sicily the Fasci are spreading, in Reggio Emilia the Italian Workers' Party is celebrating its second congress and decides to adopt the name of Italian Socialist Party (Italian: Partito Socialista Italiano, PSI).

=== October ===
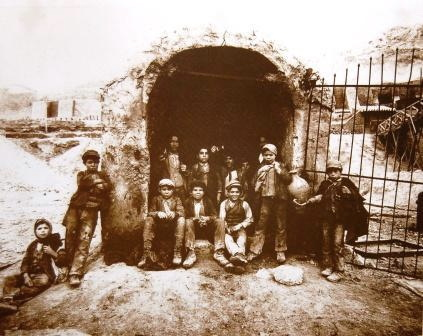
Boys at the entrance of a sulfur mine pit; 1899

- In October, a congress of sulfur miners was held in Grotte in the province of Agrigento which was attended by some 1,500 people, including workers and small producers. The sulphur workers were those who most participated in the establishment of the Fasci. The miners demanded that the minimum age to be raised to 14 years for those who worked in the sulfur mines, the decrease of working hours and setting a minimum wage. Small producers demanded measures to avoid exploitation by large owners. The minimum-age measure was meant to improve the situation for the carusi, minors that worked in conditions of near-slavery that sparked public outrage and inspired many complaints.

=== November ===
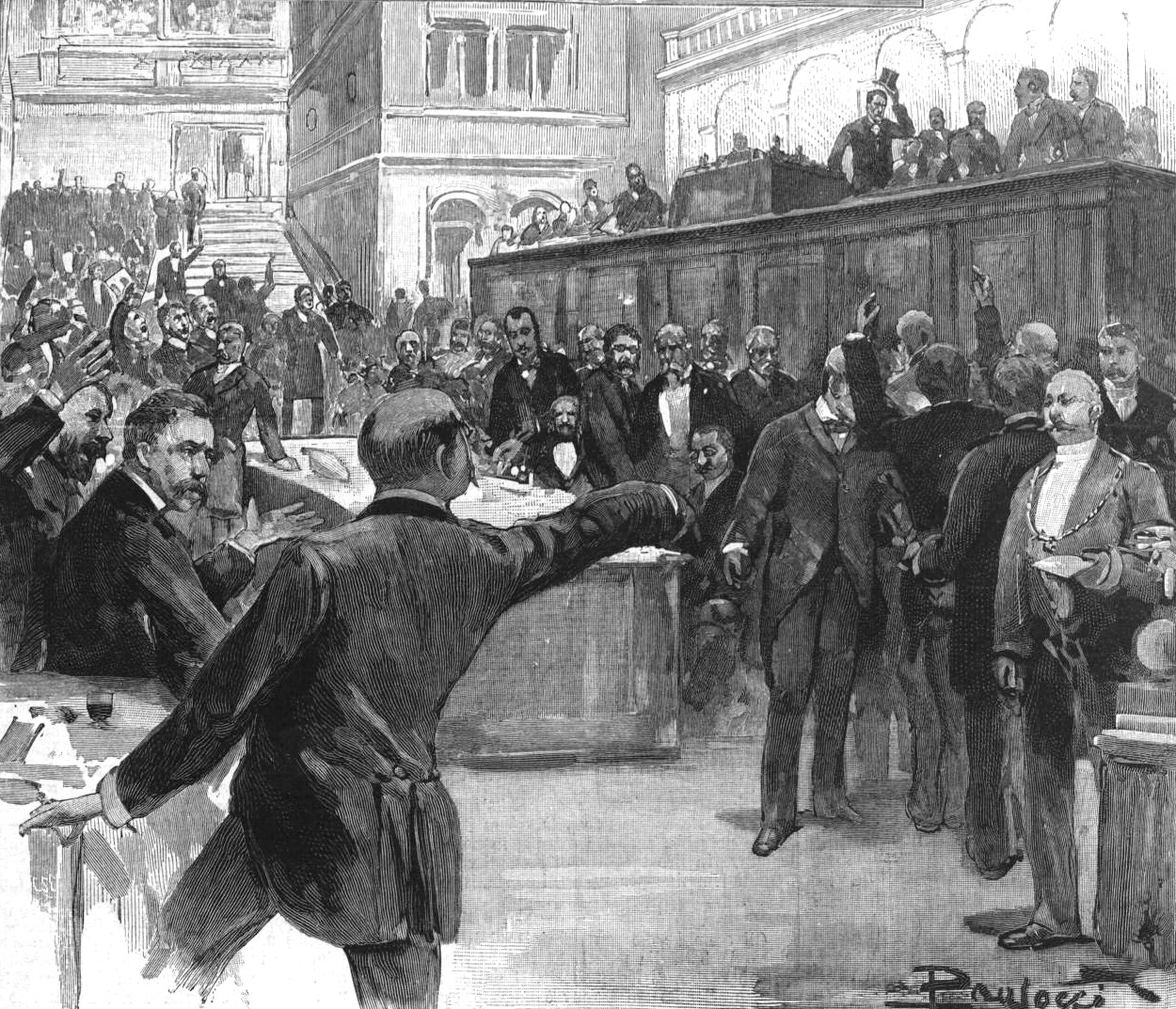
Sitting in the Chamber of Deputees on 23 November 1893 (Illustrazione italiana)

- November 23 – At the opening of the Italian Parliament, the Italian Chamber of Deputies insists that the sealed report of the commission that investigated the Banca Romana scandal will be read immediately. Amidst increasing disorder the report is read and the conclusions of the commission that former Prime Minister Crispi, Prime Minister Giolitti, and former Finance Minister Luigi Luzzatti, had been aware of the conditions of the Banca Romana but had held back that information, is hailed with shouts for the resignation of Giolitti. Rival deputies exchange insults and push and pull each other over seats and desks over a dispute to impeach the government. While the President of the Chamber, Giuseppe Zanardelli, and the minister left the session, deputies refused orders to leave until the light was turned off at 10:00 PM and opposition deputies were cheered by a large crowd on the street.
- November 24 – The government headed by Giovanni Giolitti has to resign as a result of the Banca Romana scandal after the Chamber presented the report of the Parliamentary Commission of Inquiry on banks. The Commission concluded that press charges that Giolitti had used the bank's money in the last election campaign could not be proved although it declined to affirm that was disproved.
- November 27 – Giuseppe Zanardelli, President of the Chamber of Deputies, is charged with the formation of a new Cabinet.

=== December ===
- December 4 – Zanardelli partly forms a new Cabinet but Paolo Boselli refuses to accept the Finance Ministry. Most observers predict Zanardelli will not obtain a majority.
- December 10 – Eleven people are killed in Giardinello during the revolt of the Fasci Siciliani.
- December 15 – The new government headed by Francesco Crispi takes office.
- December 21 – Battle of Agordat between Italian colonial troops and Mahdists from the Sudan. Emir Ahmed Ali campaigned against the Europeans in eastern Sudan. The Italian victory is the first decisive victory yet won by Europeans against the Sudanese revolutionaries.
- December 25 – Eleven people are killed in Lercara Friddi during the revolt of the Fasci Siciliani. In December 1893, 92 peasants lost their lives in clashes with the police and army.

== Sports ==
- September 7 – The Genoa Cricket & Athletics Club, the oldest Italian soccer club, is formed by British expatriates. In its earliest years, it principally competed in athletics and cricket. Association football was secondarily practised.

== Births ==
- January 11 – Tancredi Pasero, Italian bass singer (died 1983)
- January 26 – Giuseppe Genco Russo, Italian Mafia boss from Mussomeli (Sicily) (died 1976)
- February 12 – Giovanni Muzio, Italian architect closely associated with Novecento Italiano (died 1982)
- March 9 – Alessio De Paolis, Italian opera tenor (died 1964)
- March 14 – Franco Lo Giudice, Italian tenor (died 1990)
- March 18 – Costante Girardengo, Italian professional road bicycle racer (died 1978)
- March 24 – Gastone Brilli-Peri, Italian racing driver (died 1930)
- March 26 – Palmiro Togliatti, Italian politician and leader of the Italian Communist Party (died 1964)
- March 27 – Ugo Agostoni, Italian professional road bicycle racer (died 1941)
- April 13 – Augusto De Marsanich, Italian fascist politician and leader of the Italian Social Movement (MSI) (died 1973)
- April 21 – Romeo Bertini, Italian Marathon runner (died 1973)
- May 12 – Silvio Scaroni, Italian World War I fighter pilot (died 1977)
- June 27 – Antonietta Meneghel, Italian soprano better known by her stage name Toti Dal Monte (died 1975)
- July 1 – Mario de Bernardi, Italian World War I fighter pilot and seaplane air racer of the 1920s (died 1959)
- July 5 – Giuseppe Caselli, Italian painter (died 1976)
- July 25 – Carlo Confalonieri, Italian Cardinal of the Roman Catholic Church
- August 31 – Francesco Jacomoni di San Savino, Italian diplomat and governor of Albania before and during World War II (died 1973)
- September 12 – Giuseppe Castellano, Italian general who negotiated the Armistice between Italy and Allied armed forces on September 8, 1943 (died 1977)
- October 17 – Raffaele Bendandi, Italian pseudoscientist known for his predictions of earthquakes (died 1979)
- November 2 – Battista Farina, Italian automobile designer (died 1966)
- November 14 – Leonarda Cianciulli, Italian serial killer (died 1970)
- November 14 – Carlo Emilio Gadda, Italian writer and poet (died 1973)
- November 19 – Checco Durante, Italian film actor (died 1976)
- November 30 – Ettore Margadonna, Italian screenwriter (died 1975)

== Deaths ==
- April 17 – Giovanni Passerini, Italian botanist and entomologist (born 1816)
- May 11 – Tommaso Maria Zigliara, Roman Catholic cardinal, theologian and philosopher (born 1833)
- July 16 – Antonio Ghislanzoni, Italian politician and journalist (born 1833)
- July 5 – Antonio Superchi Italian opera baritone (born 1816)
- August 7 – Alfredo Catalani, Italian composer (born 1854)
- October 16 – Carlo Pedrotti, Italian conductor and composer (born 1817)
- October 23 – Luigi Nazari di Calabiana, Italian churchman and politician; a senator of the Kingdom of Sardinia and Archbishop of Milan (born 1808)
- October 28 – Angelo Minich, pathologist and professor of surgery at the University of Padua (born 1817)
- November 2 – Carlo Laurenzi, Italian cardinal of the Roman Catholic Church (born 1821)

== Sources ==
- (in Italian) Barbagallo, Francesco (2010). Storia della camorra, Rome: Laterza, ISBN 978-88-420-9259-9
- Seton-Watson, Christopher (1967). Italy from liberalism to fascism, 1870-1925, New York: Taylor & Francis, 1967 ISBN 0-416-18940-7
