= Luigi Pelloux =

Italian politician (1839–1924)

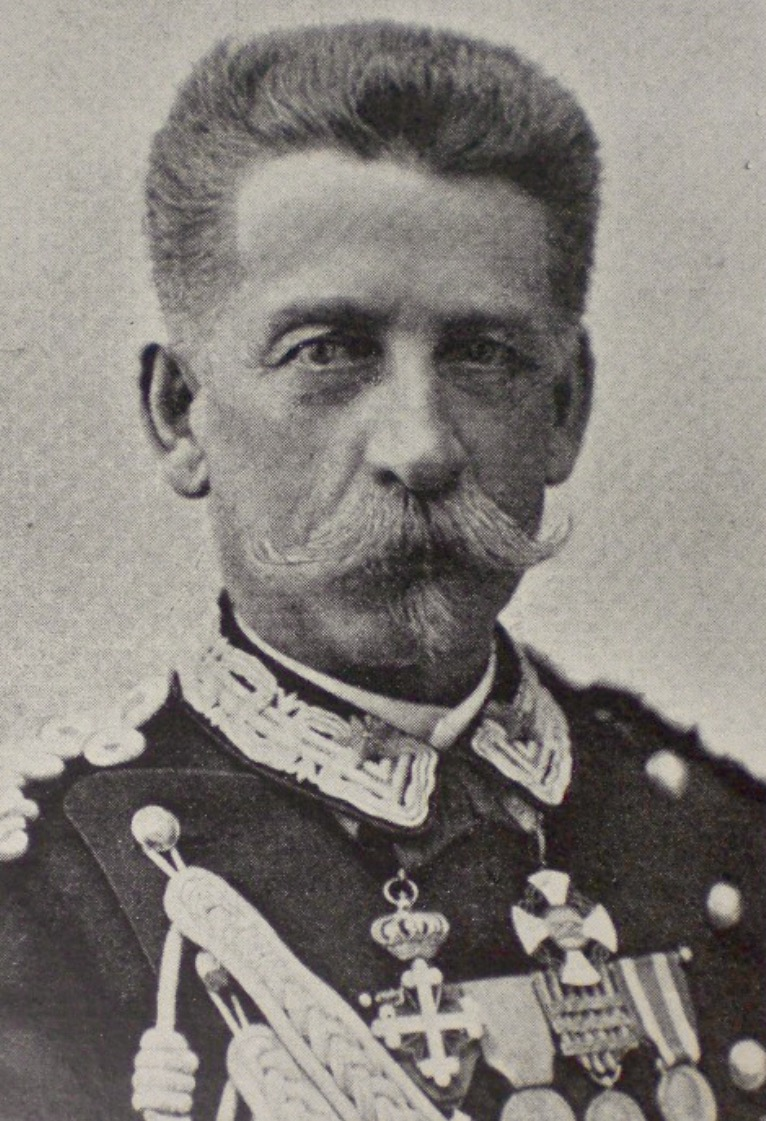

Prime Minister of Italy
- In office 29 June 1898 – 24 June 1900
- Monarch: Umberto I
- Preceded by: Antonio Starabba, Marchese di Rudinì
- Succeeded by: Giuseppe Saracco

Minister of the Interior of Italy
- In office 29 June 1898 – 24 June 1900
- Monarch: Umberto I
- Prime Minister: Himself
- Preceded by: Antonio Starabba di Rudinì
- Succeeded by: Giuseppe Saracco

Minister of War of Italy
- In office 11 July 1896 – 14 December 1897
- Monarch: Umberto I
- Prime Minister: Antonio Starabba di Rudinì
- Preceded by: Cesare Ricotti-Magnani
- Succeeded by: Alessandro Asinari di San Marzano
- In office 6 February 1891 – 15 December 1893
- Monarch: Umberto I
- Prime Minister: Antonio Starabba di Rudinì; Giovanni Giolitti
- Preceded by: Ettore Bertole-Viali
- Succeeded by: Stanislao Mocenni

Member of the Senate of the Kingdom
- In office 15 July 1896 – 26 October 1924
- Appointed by: Umberto I

Personal details
- Born: Luigi Gerolamo Pelloux; 1 March 1839 La Roche-sur-Foron, Kingdom of Sardinia
- Died: 26 October 1924 (aged 85) Bordighera, Kingdom of Italy
- Party: Independent

Military service
- Allegiance: Kingdom of Italy
- Branch/service: Royal Italian Army
- Years of service: 1857–1905
- Rank: Lieutenant General
- Battles/wars: Italian Wars of Independence

Luigi Gerolamo Pelloux (Italian pronunciation: [luˈiːdʒi pelˈlu]; 1 March 1839 – 26 October 1924) was an Italian general and politician from Savoy, born of parents who retained their Italian citizenship when Savoy was annexed to France. He was the Prime Minister of Italy from 29 June 1898 to 24 June 1900, his rule was considered by historians as conservative and militarist.

== Early career ==
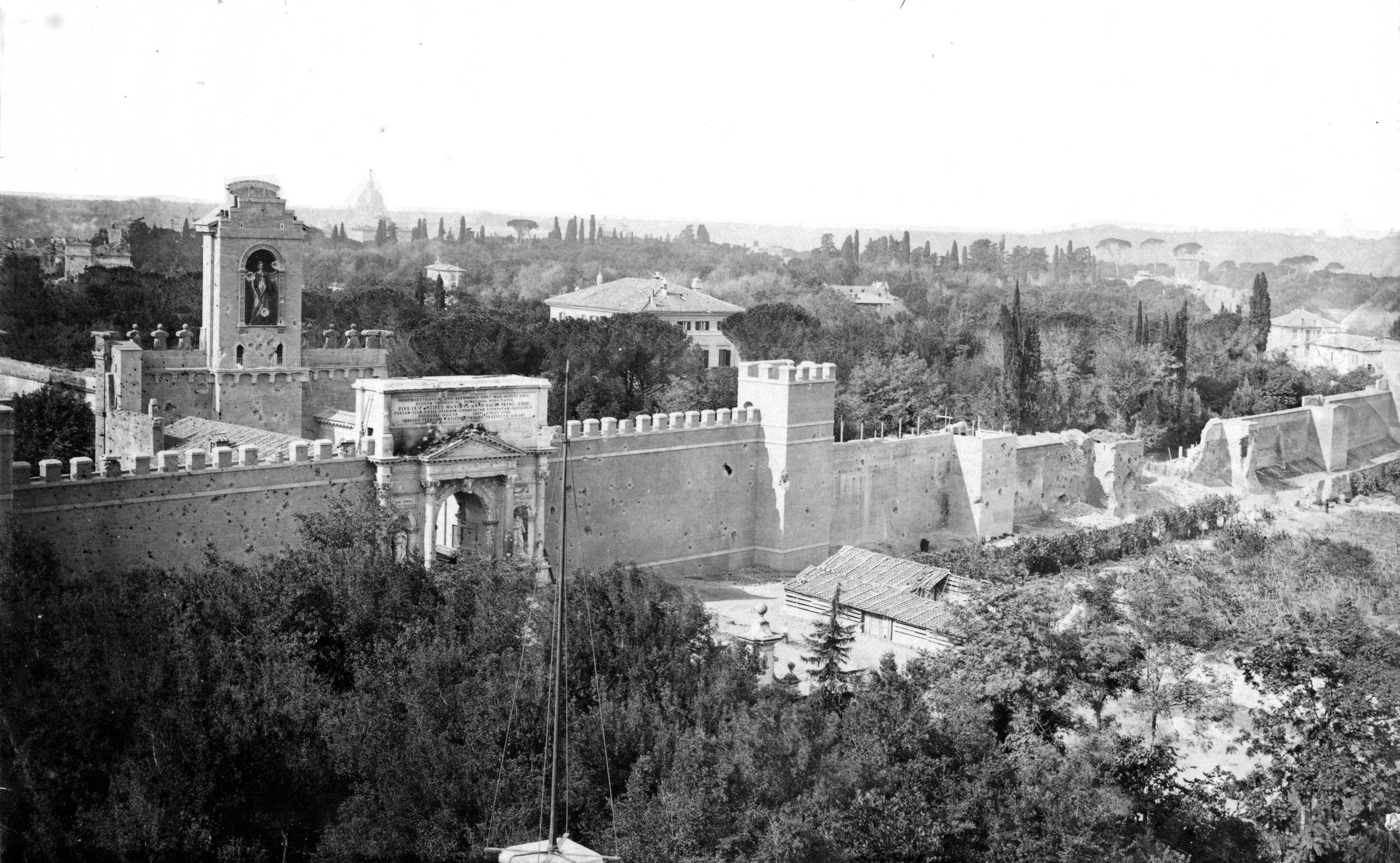
The "Porta Pia Breach" in the Aurelian Walls of Rome in 1870

Pelloux was born in La Roche-sur-Foron, Savoy, then part of the Kingdom of Sardinia. Entering the army as lieutenant of artillery in 1857 he gained the medal for military valour at the Battle of Custoza in 1866, and on September 20, 1870, commanded the brigade of artillery which battered the breach in the wall of Rome at Porta Pia, which enabled Bersaglieri soldiers to enter Rome and complete the unification of Italy. He entered the war office in 1870, and in 1880 became General Secretary, in which capacity he introduced many useful reforms in the army.

He was elected to the Chamber in 1881 as deputy for Livorno, which he represented until 1895, and joined the party of the Left. After a succession of high military commands he received the appointment of Chief of the General Staff in 1896. He was Minister of War in the Rudinì and Giolitti cabinets of 1891–1893. In July 1896 he resumed the portfolio of War in the Rudinì cabinet, and was appointed Senator. In May 1897 he secured the adoption of the Army Reform Bill, fixing Italian military expenditure at a maximum of 9,560,000 a year, but in December of that year he was defeated in the Chamber on the question of the promotion of officers.

== Prime Minister of Italy ==
Resigning office, he was sent as Royal Commissioner to Bari in May 1898, where, without recourse to martial law, he succeeded in restoring public order suppressing street demonstrations demanding "bread and work". Upon the fall of Rudinì in June 1898, after the Bava-Beccaris massacre, General Pelloux was entrusted by King Umberto with the formation of a new government, and took for himself the post Prime Minister and Minister of the Interior. He resigned office in May 1899 over his Chinese policy,

Italian Minister of Foreign Affairs Felice Napoleone Canevaro had demanded that the Chinese Empire grant it a lease for a naval coaling station at China's Sanmen Bay (known as "San-Mun Bay" to the Italians) similar to the lease the German Empire had secured in 1898 at Kiautschou Bay. China refused to comply and Italy had to withdraw its ultimatum, becoming the first and only Western power to fail to achieve its territorial goals in China. The fiasco was an embarrassment that gave Italy – still stung by its defeat at the hands of the Ethiopian Empire in the Battle of Adowa in 1896 – the appearance of a third-rate power. Pelloux and his fellow cabinet ministers stated that Canevaro had acted without informing them, and it was widely believed that king Umberto I was the one who had given Canevaro the orders to acquire a concession in China.

Pelloux was again entrusted with the formation of a government. His new cabinet was essentially military and conservative, the most decisively conservative since 1876. He took stern measures against the revolutionary elements in Italy. The Public Safety Bill for the reform of the police laws, taken over by him from the Rudinì cabinet, and eventually promulgated by royal decree, was fiercely obstructed by the Socialist Party of Italy (PSI) and Extreme Left. The law made strikes by state employees illegal; gave the executive wide powers to ban public meetings and dissolve subversive organisations; revived the penalties of banishment and preventive arrest for political offences; and tightened control of the press by making authors responsible for their articles and declaring incitement to violence a crime.

The Radicals and Socialist started an obstructionist campaign against the new coercive law using the filibuster: points of order, endless speeches and other procedural delaying tactics. When Pelloux tried to force the law through Parliament by royal decree in June 1899, more moderate politicians like Giuseppe Zanardelli and Giovanni Giolitti that considered the measure unconstitutional, joined the opposition. The growing opposition succeeded in forcing General Pelloux to dissolve the Chamber in May 1900, and to resign office after the general election in June.

== Later career ==
In the autumn of 1901 he was appointed to the command of the Turin army corps. He retired in 1905. Pelloux died at Bordighera in 1924.

Political offices
Preceded by Antonio Starabba, Marchese di Rudinì	Prime Minister of Italy; 1898 – 1900	Succeeded by Giuseppe Saracco
Preceded by Antonio Starabba, Marchese di Rudinì	Italian Minister of the Interior; 1898 – 1900	Succeeded by Giuseppe Saracco
