= Giuseppe Zanardelli =

Italian politician (1826–1903)

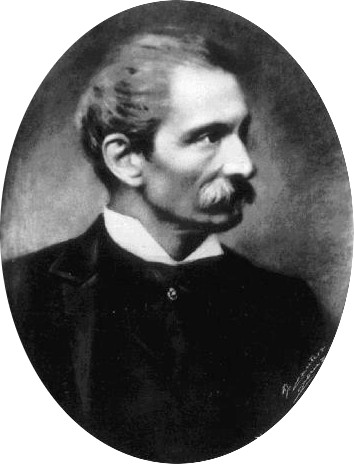

Prime Minister of Italy
- In office 15 February 1901 – 3 November 1903
- Monarch: Victor Emmanuel III
- Preceded by: Giuseppe Saracco
- Succeeded by: Giovanni Giolitti

President of the Chamber of Deputies
- In office 16 November 1898 – 25 May 1899
- Preceded by: Giuseppe Branchieri
- Succeeded by: Luigi Chinaglia
- In office 5 April 1897 – 14 December 1897
- Preceded by: Tommaso Villa
- Succeeded by: Giuseppe Branchieri
- In office 23 November 1892 – 20 February 1894
- Preceded by: Giuseppe Branchieri
- Succeeded by: Giuseppe Branchieri

Minister of the Interior
- In office 21 June 1903 – 2 November 1903
- Prime Minister: Giovanni Giolitti
- Preceded by: Giovanni Giolitti
- Succeeded by: Giovanni Giolitti
- In office 28 March 1878 – 19 December 1878
- Prime Minister: Benedetto Cairoli
- Preceded by: Agostino Depretis
- Succeeded by: Agostino Depretis

Minister of Justice
- In office 14 December 1897 – 1 June 1898
- Prime Minister: Antonio Starabba
- Preceded by: Emanuele Gianturco
- Succeeded by: Teodorico Bonacci
- In office 4 April 1887 – 6 February 1891
- Prime Minister: Francesco Crispi
- Preceded by: Diego Tajani
- Succeeded by: Luigi Ferraris
- In office 29 May 1881 – 25 May 1883
- Prime Minister: Agostino Depretis
- Preceded by: Tommaso Villa
- Succeeded by: Bernardino Giannuzzi-Savelli

Member of the Chamber of Deputies
- In office 18 February 1861 – 26 December 1903
- Constituency: Iseo

Personal details
- Born: 29 October 1826 Brescia, Kingdom of Lombardy–Venetia, Austria
- Died: 26 December 1903 (aged 77) Maderno, Kingdom of Italy
- Party: Historical Left; Dissident Left

Giuseppe Zanardelli (29 October 1826 – 26 December 1903) was an Italian jurist and political figure. He served as the Prime Minister of Italy from 15 February 1901 to 3 November 1903. An eloquent orator, he was also a Grand Master freemason. Zanardelli, representing the bourgeoisie from Lombardy, personified the classical 19th-century liberalism, committed to suffrage expansion, anticlericalism, civil liberties, free trade and laissez-faire economics. Throughout his long political career, he was among the most ardent advocates of freedom of conscience and divorce.

== Early life ==
Italian Prime Minister Zanardelli standing on a cart drawn by oxen during a visit to Basilicata in September 1902.

Giuseppe Zanardelli was born in Brescia (Lombardy) on 29 October 1826. He was a combatant in the volunteer corps during the First Italian War of Independence of 1848 between the Austrian Empire and the Kingdom of Sardinia, within the era of Italian unification (Risorgimento). After the lost battle of Novara he went to Pisa to study law, and he returned to Brescia to become a barrister. For a time earned a livelihood by teaching law, but was molested by the Austrian police and forbidden to teach in consequence of his refusal to contribute pro-Austrian articles to the press.

In 1859 he was forced to flee to Switzerland. He moved to Lugano, but returned in time to organize the insurrection of Brescia in the Second Italian War of Independence and welcomed Giuseppe Garibaldi in the city. Enlisted in the Cacciatori delle Alpi (Hunters of the Alps), he remained in the area until the armistice of Villafranca. With the annexation of Lombardy to Piedmont, he was elected to Parliament in Turin.

Elected deputy in 1859, he received various administrative appointments, but only attained a political office in 1876 when the Left, of which he had been a prominent and influential member, came into power. Zanardelli became a freemason in 1860; he was initiated in the Lodge "Propaganda" of Rome.

== In government ==
In 1876 he became Minister of Public Works in the first government of Agostino Depretis, and Minister of the Interior in the government of Benedetto Cairoli in 1878. In the latter capacity, he drafted the franchise reform, but created dissatisfaction by the indecision of his administrative acts, particularly in regard to the Irredentist agitation, and by his theory of repressing and not in any way preventing crime, which led for a time to an epidemic of murders.

Overthrown with Cairoli in December 1878, he returned to power as Minister of Justice in 1881 with the Depretis government, and succeeded in completing the commercial code. He also was the architect of the electoral reform in 1892 which lowered the voting age from 25 to 21, and reduced the minimum tax threshold for voting or allowed an elementary school certificate.

Abandoned awhile by Depretis in 1883, he remained in opposition until 1887, when he again joined Depretis as Minister of Justice, retaining his portfolio throughout the ensuing government of Francesco Crispi, until 31 January 1891. During this period he began the reform of the magistracy and promulgated a new penal code, which unified penal legislation in Italy, abolished capital punishment and recognised the workers right to strike. The code was regarded as a great work by contemporary European jurists.

After the fall of the government of Giovanni Giolitti in 1893, Zanardelli made a strenuous but unsuccessful attempt to form an administration. Elected president of the chamber in 1894 and 1896, he exercised that office with ability until, in December 1897, he accepted the Ministry of Justice in the government of Antonio di Rudinì, only to resign in the following spring on account of dissensions with his colleague, Emilio, marquis Visconti-Venosta, over the measures necessary to prevent a recurrence of the Bava-Beccaris massacre of May 1898.

== Prime minister ==
Returning to the presidency of the chamber, he again abandoned his post in order to associate himself with the obstructionist campaign against the Public Safety Bill (1899–1900) restricting political activity and free speech, which was introduced by the government of general Luigi Pelloux. He was rewarded by being enabled to form an administration with the support of the Extreme Left upon the fall of the government of Giuseppe Saracco in February 1901. Giolitti became Minister of the Interior in the administration of Zanardelli, and became its real head.

Zanardelli focused his attention on the issue of the South: in September 1902 he undertook a journey through Basilicata, as one of the poorest regions in Italy, to see for himself the problems in the Mezzogiorno. Zanardelli tenure was handicapped by his declining health, but several social reforms were passed, such as a law for reducing the tax on flour, and laws regulating workmen’s compensation and the labour of women and children, while provisions were made for the treatment of poor people affected by malaria.

In 1902, a law was passed that set the minimum working age at 12, while also limiting the working day for female workers to 11 hours. That same year, a Supreme Council of Labour was set up as an advisory body "to examine labour issues and to give its opinion on proposed legislation." A law introduced on 21 June 1902 authorized the establishment of an agricultural credit institution in Lazio with the power to grant short- and long-term agricultural credit in that province. Law no. 254, which was passed on 31 May 1903, sought to improve living conditions for workers and to control housing speculation, with the establishment of a Public Housing Institute (Istituto per la Case Popolari). The law was known as the Luzzatti law, since it was introduced by the deputy Luigi Luzzatti, a member of the opposition at that time.

However, his proposed divorce bill, although voted in the chamber, had to be withdrawn on account of the strong opposition of the country. He retired from the administration on 21 October 1903 due to his declining health, and Giolitti succeeded him as Prime Minister. Tired and ill, he died in Maderno on 26 December 1903.

== In popular culture ==
On 15 September 1902, Zanardelli stayed at the Imperial Hotel Tramontano, owned by the Commendator Guglielmo Baron Tramontano of Sorrento, who was also the mayor of the city Sorrento. Baron Guglielmo Tramontano asked the musician brothers Giambattista and Ernesto De Curtis to compose and write a song in honour of Zanardelli, and the result became the famous Neapolitan song "Torna a Surriento" (Come Back to Sorrento).

== Honours ==
- Kingdom of Prussia: Knight of the Order of the Black Eagle – August 1902 – during the visit to Germany of King Victor Emmanuel III of Italy.
- Ottoman Empire: Grand Cordon of the Order of Osmanieh – September 1902 – during the visit to Constantinople of an Italian Regia Marina squadron.
- France: Grand Cross of the Légion d'Honneur – November 1902 – ″in testimony of the good relations between France and Italy″.

== Sources ==
- Clark, Martin (2008). Modern Italy: 1871 to the present, Third Edition, London/New York: Routledge, ISBN 978-1-4058-2352-4
- De Grand, Alexander J. (2001). The hunchback's tailor: Giovanni Giolitti and liberal Italy from the challenge of mass politics to the rise of fascism, 1882–1922, Greenwood.
- Giolitti, Giovanni (1923). Memoirs of My Life (translated by Edward Storer). London: Chapman and Dodd Ltd.
- Mazzola, Ettore Maria (2016). The sustainable city is possible: A possible strategy for recovering urban quality and local economies. Rome: Gangemi Editore ISBN 978-88-492-9172-8
- Sarti, Roland (2004). Italy: a reference guide from the Renaissance to the present, New York: Facts on File Inc., ISBN 0-81607-474-7
- Seton-Watson, Christopher (1967). Italy from liberalism to fascism, 1870–1925, New York: Taylor & Francis, ISBN 0-416-18940-7
- Vecchi, Giovanni (2017). Measuring Wellbeing: A History of Italian Living Standards, New York, NY: Oxford University Press ISBN 978-0-19-994459-0
