= Bava Beccaris massacre =

Repression of riots in Milan, Italy (1898)

Coordinates: 45°28′4″N 9°12′25″E

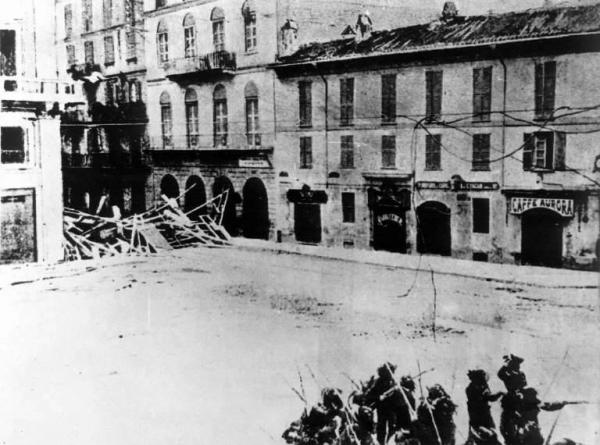
- Barricades of the rioters and intervention of the military, Milan 1898
- Location: Milan, Italy
- Date: 6–10 May 1898
- Target: Demonstrators against rising food prices
- Attack type: Massacre
- Deaths: 80 (per government); 400 (per opposition)
- Injuries: 450 (per government); 2,000 (per opposition)
- Perpetrator: Royal Italian Army
- Motive: Repression of food price demonstrations and riots after a steep increase of wheat prices

The Bava Beccaris massacre, named after the Italian general Fiorenzo Bava Beccaris, was the repression of widespread food riots in Milan, Italy, on 6–10 May 1898. In Italy the suppression of these demonstrations is also known as Fatti di Maggio (transl. Events of May) or I Moti di Milano del 1898 (transl. 1898 Milan Riots). Between 80 and 400 demonstrators were killed, as well as two soldiers, and between 450 and 2,000 were wounded.

The overreaction of the military led to the fall of Antonio di Rudinì's government in July 1898 and created a constitutional crisis, strengthening the opposition. The events of May marked a height of popular discontent with government, the military and the monarchy.

== Background ==
In 1897, the wheat harvest in Italy was substantially lower than the years before; it fell from on average 3.5 million tonnes in 1891–95 to 2.4 million tonnes that year. Moreover, the importation of American grain was more expensive due to the Spanish–American War in 1898. Wheat prices in Milan increased from 225 lire a tonne to 330 lire a tonne in April 1898.

In an attempt to halt or slow down the steadily rising prices the government of Di Rudinì was urged to abolish the duties placed on imported wheat. In January 1898 the tariff was lowered from 75 lire a tonne to 50 lire, but this was generally considered to be too little and too late. Street demonstrations demanding "bread and work" began in the South of Italy, which had already seen widespread revolts by the Fasci Siciliani in 1893–94. In towns including Bari and Naples the rioting was successfully suppressed, while the town of Florence was under the control of demonstrators for a whole day. The situation escalated when demonstrators were shot by nervous policemen, and rioting increased.

== The riots ==
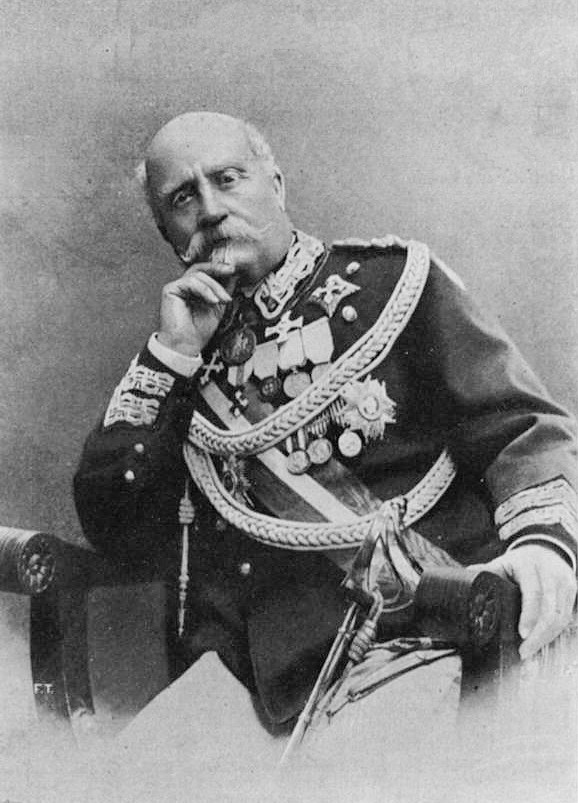
General Fiorenzo Bava Beccaris

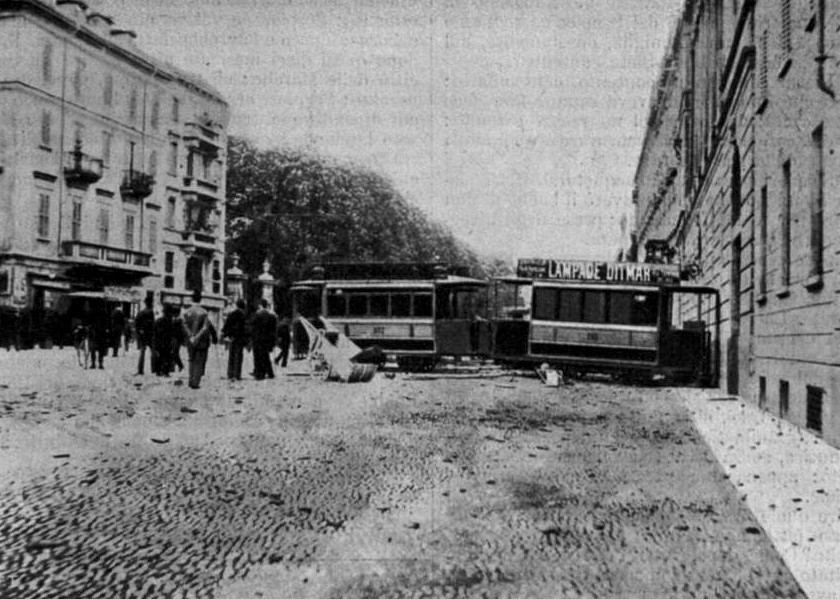
Barricade in the Corso Venezia (Photoː Luca Comerio)

On 5 May 1898, workers organized a strike against the rise of food prices. The first blood was shed that day at Pavia, when the son of Giuseppe Mussi, a deputy from Milan, was killed by the police in an attempt to control the crowd. The next day, 6 May, workers of the Pirelli factory went on strike in the morning and leaflets denouncing the events of the previous day were distributed. Riots broke out and two were shot and killed. Riots also broke out in Florence and Livorno.

Di Rudinì's government declared a state of siege in Lombardy and the city. General Fiorenzo Bava Beccaris, a veteran of the wars of independence that had unified Italy, was ordered to Milan. Infantry, cavalry and artillery were brought into the city, as well as railway troops because railway workers had gone on strike as well. The troops were mainly conscripts from rural and alpine areas, considered to be more reliable in a time of civil unrest than those from urban districts. With his reserves, Bava Beccaris had 45,000 men at his disposal.

On 7 May, 60,000 people went on strike, moving from the working-class neighbourhoods in the outskirts of the city towards the city center. Bava Beccaris deployed his forces in the Piazza del Duomo, Milan's central square, determined to stop the strikers and force them back to the city outskirts and regain control over the central railway station. The troops met with fierce resistance while trying to remove the barricades that had been erected, and were bombarded with stones and tiles from the rooftops. Some of the demonstrators had acquired rifles from the workshops of arms manufacturers.

General Bava Beccaris ordered his troops to fire on demonstrators and used the artillery as well. The streets were cleared and on 9 May 1898 artillery breached the walls of a monastery outside Porta Monforte, but instead of protestors they found a group of beggars who were there to receive alms from the friars. According to the Italian government, a total of 80 demonstrators and other civilians were killed, as well as two soldiers, while 450 people were wounded. The opposition in Italy alleged 400 civilian deaths and more than 2,000 wounded, while The New York Times reported 300 people killed and 1,000 wounded.

== Backlash ==
Military tribunals were set up which ended up sentencing around 1,500 citizens to serve various lengths of prison time. Bava Beccaris personally presided over some of these tribunals. Analysts deemed the conduct of the authorities to be "a travesty of justice and a mockery of legal procedure." Newspapers considered to be in opposition to the government were suppressed, and several Catholic and Socialist organisations were forcefully dissolved.

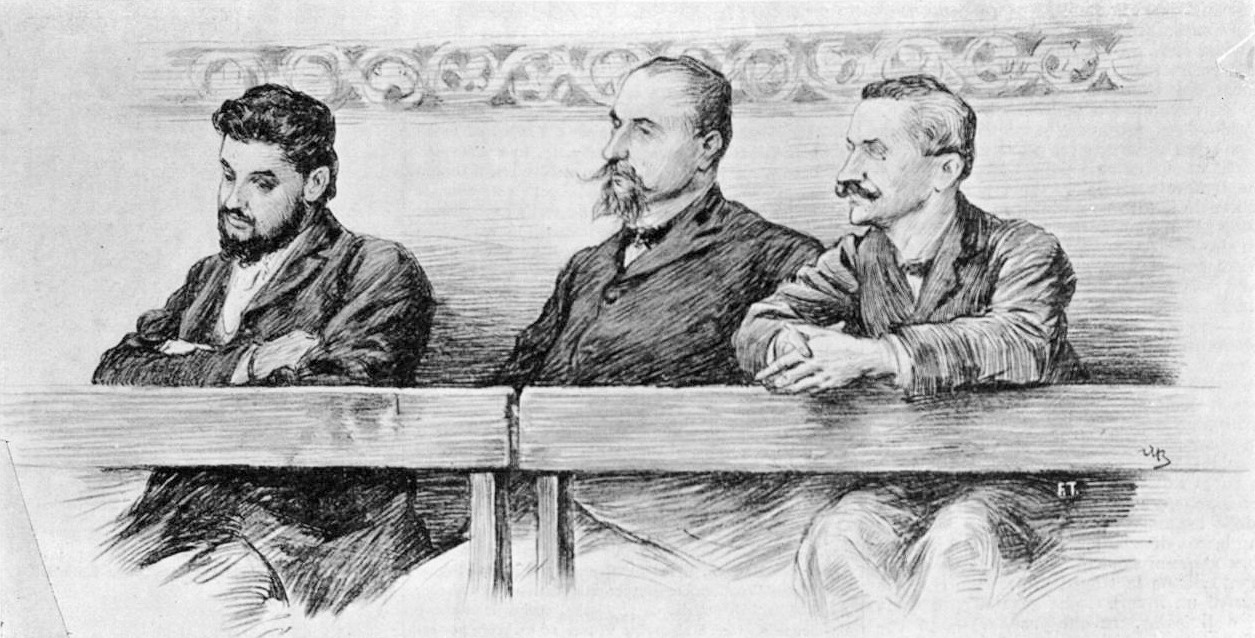
Filippo Turati, Oddino Morgari and Luigi De Andreis during the trial in Milan in 1898

On 27 July 1898, the trial against the deputies Luigi De Andreis (Republican) (it), Filippo Turati and Oddino Morgari (Socialists) started. They were accused of seditious activity against the constitution and government of Italy, as well as for the devastation and plundering of the city of Milan during the bread riots. Despite sitting in Parliament and thus supposedly being immune from prosecution, they were all arrested during the siege and the Chamber of Deputies granted authorisation to proceed with the trial. Sentencing followed on 1 August 1898 where De Andreis and Turati were given 12-year prison sentences and Morgari was acquitted.

Turati, one of the people who founded the Italian Socialist Party (PSI) in 1892, had in fact been trying to calm down the situation with a pamphlet calling on the demonstrators to be "calm and patient" and arguing that the "days for street fighting are past." Even though he had been sentenced to over a decade in prison, he was freed a year later in 1899, following a wave of discontent in the country. His experiences during the riots convinced Turati that the way ahead was the parliamentary route and he thus renounced violent action.

== Aftermath ==
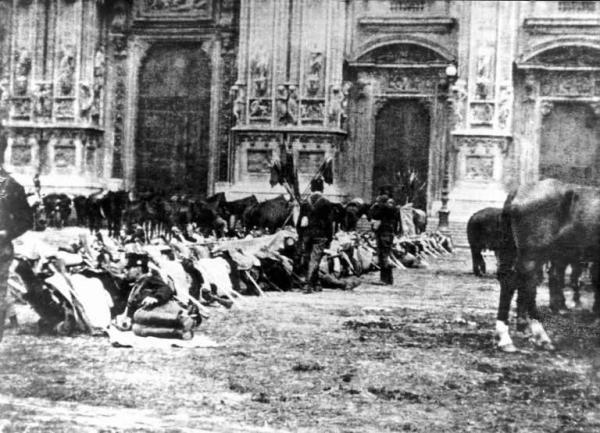
Piazza del Duomo, Milan, 1898. Troops deployed against demonstrators (Photoː Luca Comerio)

King Umberto I praised Bava Beccaris and awarded him the medal of the Great Cross of the Order of Savoy (Grande Ufficiale dell'Ordine Militare di Savoia) a month later "to reward the great service you rendered to our institutions and to civilization, and to attest to my affection and the gratitude of myself and the country". On 29 July 1900, the king was assassinated in Monza by the anarchist Gaetano Bresci, who said he had come directly from the United States to avenge the victims of the repression and the insult of the decoration awarded to Bava Beccaris.

The overreaction of the military led to the downfall of di Rudinì and his government in May 1898 and created a constitutional crisis, strengthening the opposition. The massacre marked a height of popular discontent with government, the military and the monarchy.

The new Prime Minister Luigi Pelloux, who in May 1898 had restored public order in Bari without recourse to martial law, introduced a new Public Safety Bill to reform police laws. The law made strikes by state employees illegal, gave the executive wider powers to ban public meetings and dissolve subversive organisations, revived the penalties of banishment and preventive arrest for political offences, and tightened control of the press by making authors responsible for their articles, and declared incitement to violence a crime.

The new coercive law was fiercely obstructed by the Socialist Party, which, with the Historical Left and Historical Far Left, succeeded in forcing General Pelloux to dissolve the Chamber in May 1900 after he had promulgated the new law by royal decree. Even members of his conservative constituency accused him of acting unconstitutionally, and Pelloux had to resign after the general election in June.

== Depictions in photography and art ==
The professional photographer Luca Comerio (it) took numerous photographs of the events, which were reported in the main illustrated magazines of the time, such as L'Illustrazione Italiana, L'Illustrazione popolare and La Tribuna illustrata. L'Illustrazione Italiana published no fewer than 20 of his pictures, although some of them appear evidently redrawn. Comerio later claimed that several pictures were seized from him and that they were also used by the police to identify participants in the riots. However, he also obtained a pass from General Bava Beccaris.

The artist Quinto Cenni prepared a series of 34 eyewitness paintings showing various scenes of the disturbances in the city and of the actions taken to suppress them. These generally favoured the government version of events, showing soldiers behaving with restraint under provocation and being welcomed by ordinary citizens.

== See also ==
- Kingdom of Italy
- List of massacres in Italy

== Sources ==
- Clark, Martin (1984/2014). Modern Italy, 1871 to the Present, New York: Routledge, ISBN 978-1-4058-2352-4
- Sarti, Roland (2004). Italy: A reference Guide from the Renaissance to the Present, New York: Facts on File Inc., ISBN 0-81607-474-7
- Seton-Watson, Christopher (1967). Italy from Liberalism to Fascism, 1870–1925, New York: Taylor & Francis, ISBN 0-416-18940-7
- Stephenson, Charles (2014). A Box of Sand: The Italo-Ottoman War 1911–1912, Tycehurst: Tattered Flag, ISBN 978-0-9576892-2-0
