= Gaetano Bresci =

Assassin of Umberto I (1869–1901)

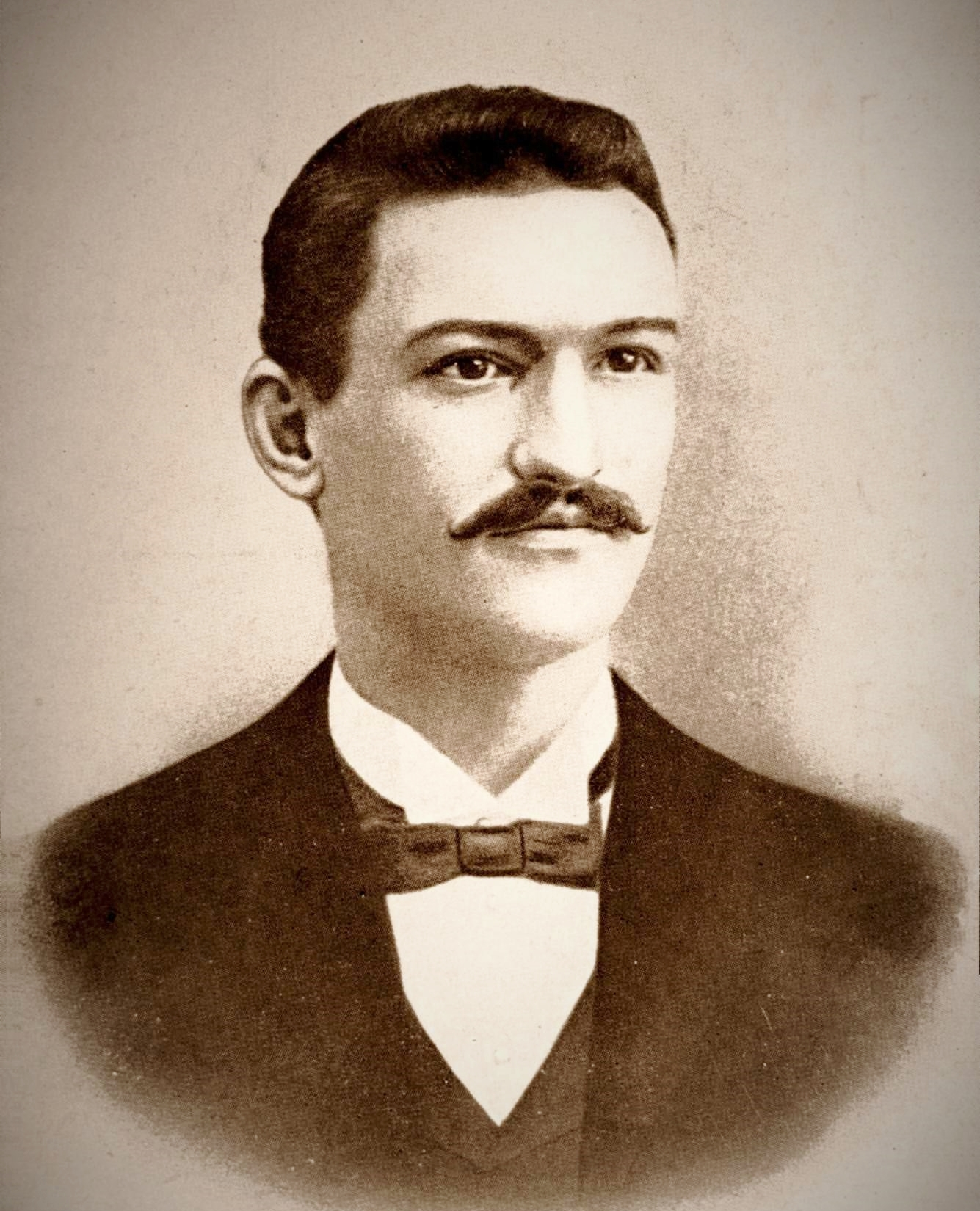
- Bresci, c. 1890s
- Born: 11 November 1869; Prato, Italy
- Died: 22 May 1901 (aged 31); Santo Stefano Island, Italy
- Cause of death: Suicide by hanging
- Occupation: Weaver
- Movement: Anarchism in Italy
- Conviction: Murder of Umberto I
- Penalty: Life imprisonment

Gaetano Bresci (Italian: [ɡaeˈtaːno ˈbreʃʃi]; 11 November 1869 – 22 May 1901) was an Italian anarchist who assassinated King Umberto I of Italy. His experience working as a young weaver led him to the conclusion that he had faced exploitation in the workplace, which attracted him to anarchism. Bresci emigrated to the United States, where he became involved with other Italian immigrant anarchists in Paterson, New Jersey. News of the Bava Beccaris massacre motivated him to return to Italy, where he planned to assassinate Umberto in response. Local police knew of his return but did not mobilize. Bresci killed the king in July 1900 during Umberto's scheduled appearance in Monza amid a sparse police presence.

The government of Italy suspected that Bresci had been a part of a conspiracy, but no evidence was found to indicate that others were involved. He was consequently sentenced to life imprisonment for murder and confined on Santo Stefano Island in Latina, Lazio, where he was found dead of an apparent suicide within the year. After his death, Bresci gained the status of a martyr within the Italian anarchist movement, who defended his regicidal act. Bresci inspired some anarchists to carry out their own acts of propaganda by deed, most prominently Leon Czolgosz's assassination of United States President William McKinley. Italian anarchists erected a monument to Bresci in Carrara despite governmental attempts to block it.

== Early life ==
On 11 November 1869, Gaetano Bresci was born into a lower middle-class family in Prato, Tuscany, the son of Gaspero Bresci and Maddalena Godi. His parents owned a small amount of land in Coiano, where they farmed grapes, olives, and wheat. His older brothers, Lorenzo and Angiolo, respectively worked as a shoemaker and as an officer in the Italian military. In 1880, the Kingdom of Italy began importing cheap grain from the United States, which economically devastated small farmers like the Brescis. As the price of grain fell, the family fell into poverty and Gaetano himself started working to support his family's income. He came to blame the Italian state for his family's experiences with poverty. When he was 11 years old, Bresci began an apprenticeship as a weaver at a textile factory. On Sundays, he attended a vocational school, where he specialized in weaving silk. By the time he reached the age of 15, he had qualified to work as a silk weaver.

Present-day Italy with key locations of Bresci's life

Bresci was radicalized by his experience of being exploited in the workplace, and he joined the Italian anarchist movement. On 3 October 1892, Bresci and a group of about twenty anarchists confronted two police officers that had given a young worker a citation for not closing his butcher shop on time. Armed police dispersed the group and Bresci was later arrested for the act. On 27 December 1892, he was tried and found guilty of insulting the police. He was sentenced to 15 days in prison, and was subsequently marked in police files as a "dangerous anarchist".

Bresci was arrested again in 1895, after organising a textile workers' strike, for which he was exiled to Lampedusa by the government of Francesco Crispi. During his forced residence on the island, Bresci studied anarchist literature and became further radicalized. Bresci was granted amnesty in 1896, and returned to the mainland. His status as an anarchist activist also followed him and he initially had difficulty finding work, before being hired to work at a wool factory. He developed a reputation as a dandy and engaged in numerous affairs, possibly fathering a child with one of his co-workers. Sustained economic difficulties, among other factors, soon led him to consider emigration.

In 1897, Bresci immigrated to the United States. From New York City, Bresci moved to Hoboken, New Jersey, where he met and married Sophie Kneiland, an Irish-American with whom he fathered two daughters: Madeleine and Gaetanina. To support his family, Bresci spent his weekdays working as a silk weaver in Paterson, New Jersey, returning to Hoboken on weekends. He indulged in purchases of fine clothing with his wages, and developed photography as a hobby. In Paterson, Bresci quickly became involved in the local trade unions and the immigrant anarchist movement. He briefly joined the Right to Existence Group (Italian: Gruppo diritto all'esistenza), but left after a few months as he found the group insufficiently radical. At one of the group's meetings, Bresci reportedly saved the life of Errico Malatesta, when he disarmed a disgruntled individualist anarchist who had shot and wounded Malatesta. Bresci also co-founded and financially supported its newspaper, La Questione Sociale, for which he became a prolific "firebrand" contributor. He wrote to his brother that they benefitted from freedom of the press and relative political equality in the United States, but that anti-Italian sentiments also ran high, recalling that Anglo-Americans called Italians "pigs".

== Assassination of Umberto ==
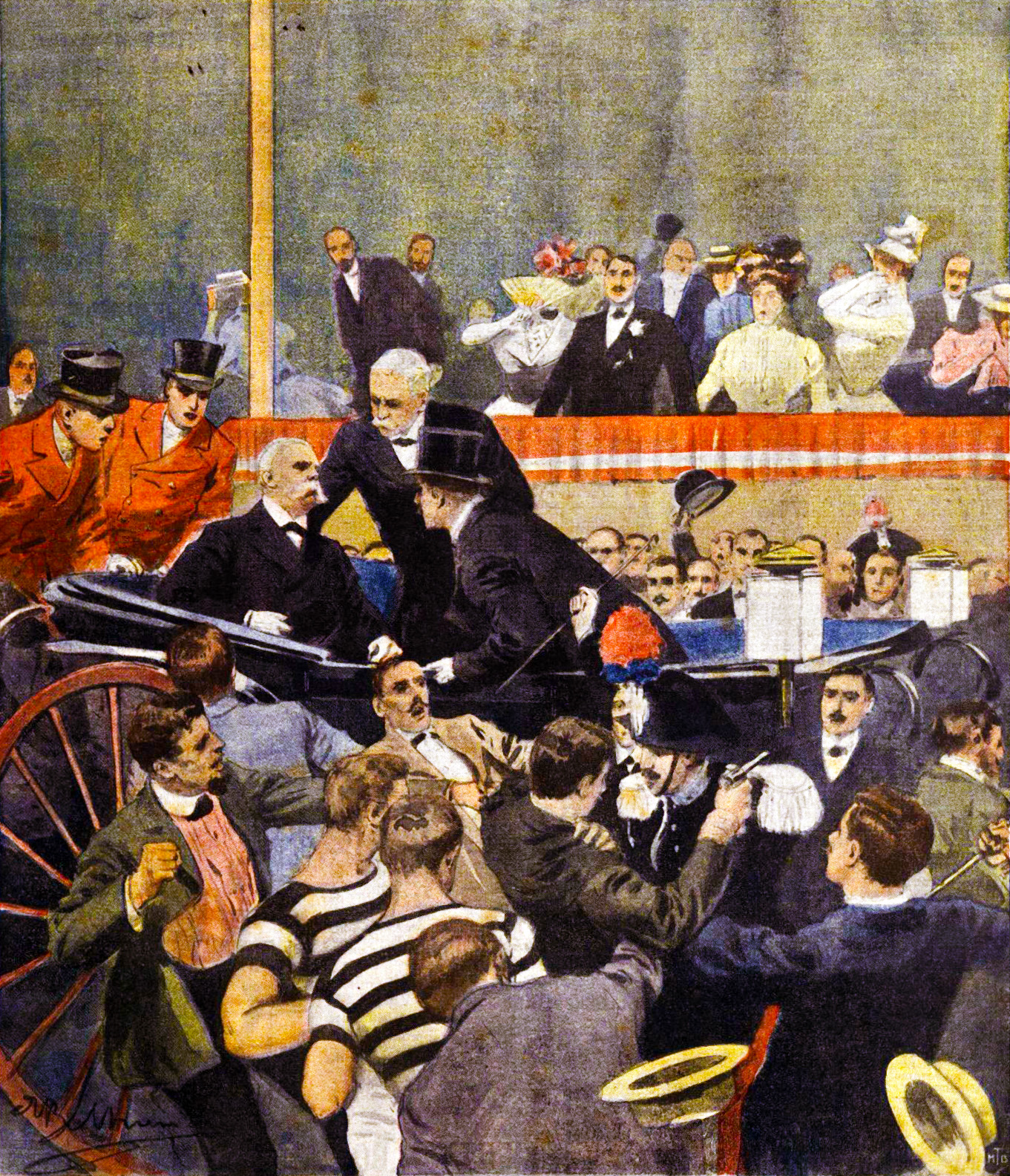
Illustration of Bresci assassinating Umberto I of Italy

In 1898, Bresci received news of the Bava Beccaris massacre. Protests in Milan against the rising price of bread had been violently suppressed by the Royal Italian Army, which fired on and killed many of the protestors. By this time, Bresci had fallen under the influence of the individualist anarchist Giuseppe Ciancabilla, an advocate of propaganda of the deed. Bresci swore revenge against King Umberto I of Italy, who he held personally responsible for the massacre as he had decreed a state of siege in Milan and awarded a medal to Fiorenzo Bava Beccaris, the general who ordered the shooting.

Bresci requested that La Questione Sociale return $150 (equivalent to $5,800 in 2025) which he had lent to them, and with it he bought a Harrington & Richardson revolver in .32 or .38 S&W and a one-way ticket back to Europe. They respectively cost him $7 (equivalent to $270 in 2025) and $27 (equivalent to $1,040 in 2025), with the latter discounted for the occasion of the 1900 Paris Exposition. Before leaving, he told his wife that he was returning to resolve his deceased parents' estate. Bresci set sail in May 1900, disembarking at Le Havre and briefly staying in Paris, before leaving for Italy. In June 1900, Bresci returned to his home city of Prato, where he stayed with his brother's family. Although the local police chief was aware of Bresci's presence and knew that police records had listed him as a "dangerous anarchist", the chief did not follow procedure of informing Italy's Ministry of the Interior or retaining Bresci's passport. Unsurveilled, Bresci was free to practice firing his revolver daily.

In July 1900, Bresci visited his sister in Castel San Pietro Terme, before moving on to Milan. On 25 July, he toured Milan with his friend Luigi Granotti before traveling to Monza. Bresci learned that Umberto was due to attend a gymnastics competition at the Royal Villa of Monza. Bresci found a room near the Monza train station and waited to strike. For two days, he scouted the area and inquired about the king's activities.

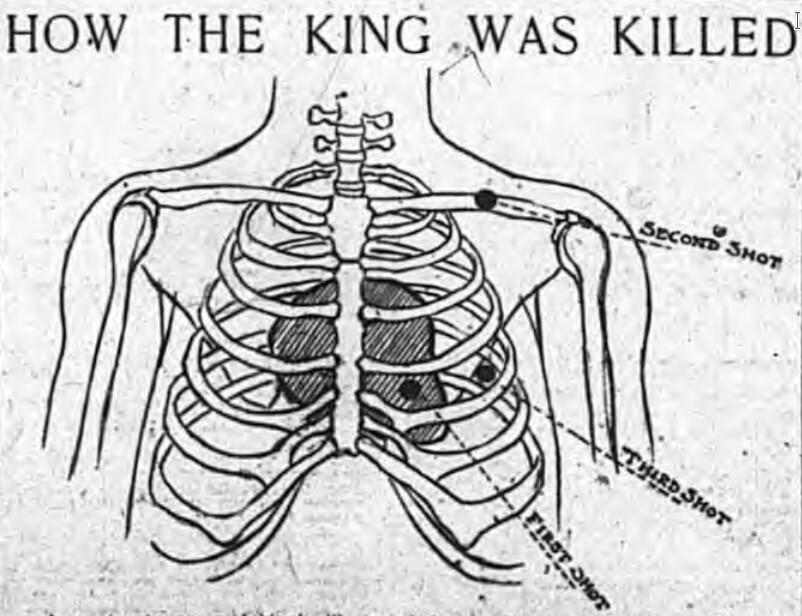
Period illustration of where Umberto was shot

On the morning of 29 July 1900, after preparing his weapon and thoroughly grooming himself, Bresci left his hotel intent on assassinating the king at the end of the contest. He spent most of the day walking around town and eating ice cream, briefly stopping for lunch with a stranger, whom he told, "Look at me carefully, because you will perhaps remember me for the rest of your life." That evening at 21:30, Umberto took his car to the stadium, where the king was to hand out medals to the competition's athletes at 22:00. There were very few law enforcement agents (Carabinieri) stationed along the route and not enough to effectively carry out crowd control at the stadium.

Bresci had positioned himself along the road exiting the stadium to give himself a chance at escape; the excited crowd swept him within three meters of the king's car and blocked his way out. While amongst the crowd, Bresci drew his revolver and shot Umberto three or four times. As the king lay dying, the angry crowd wrestled Bresci to the ground and a Carabinieri marshal intervened before Bresci could be lynched. He accepted arrest without resistance, declaring: "I did not kill Umberto. I have killed the King. I killed a principle."

== Trial and conviction ==
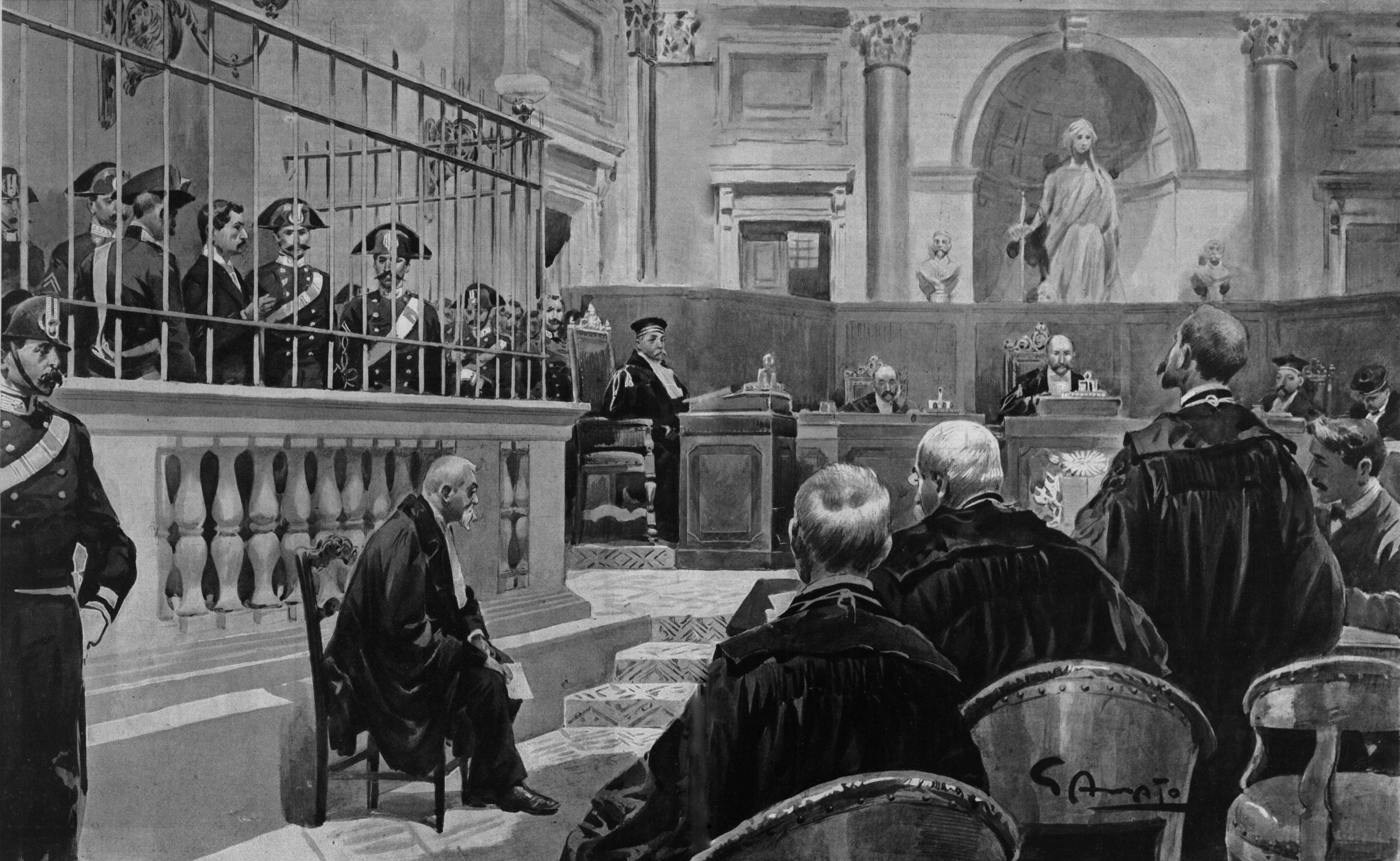
Illustration of Bresci's trial in Milan

A month after the assassination, Bresci was tried, convicted, and sentenced in a single day on 30 August 1900. His lawyer, Francesco Saverio Merlino, argued that the idolization of kings had weakened Italy and that the criminalization of the anarchist movement had directly led to Umberto's assassination. He proposed that the decriminalization of radical ideologies and the resumption of civil liberties would put an end to propaganda of the deed, the anarchist practice of political assassination. Bresci's character was further defended by his old foreman, a long-time co-worker, and his own wife, who herself expressed surprise that her husband could have committed the assassination. Examinations by the Italian criminologist Cesare Lombroso found no evidence of mental illness and the prosecution was thus unable to establish criminal insanity.

The government of Italy assumed Bresci had acted as part of a conspiracy. Interior minister Giovanni Giolitti was convinced the assassination had been plotted by Paterson anarchists such as Errico Malatesta together with the exiled Neapolitan Queen Maria Sophie of Bavaria, whom Giolitti alleged was planning to return to power in Italy. Another popular conspiracy theory asserted that Giuseppe Ciancabilla had originally been selected as the assassin by a revolutionary committee in London, but was replaced by Bresci after he got into a conflict with Malatesta over the editorship of La Questione Sociale. In the investigation that ensued after Bresci's trial, eleven of his associates – including his brother, travel companions, and epistolary partners – were arrested and held in solitary confinement under suspicion of collaborating on the assassination. They were finally released the following year, when the Milan appellate court found insufficient evidence of their involvement and dropped the charges. Further investigations in the United States likewise found no evidence of a conspiracy by Paterson anarchists to assassinate Umberto. The Italian diplomats Giovanni Branchi and Saverio Fava were themselves left thoroughly dissatisfied with the "worthless" investigations conducted by the New York City Police Department, United States Secret Service, and the Pinkerton detective agency.

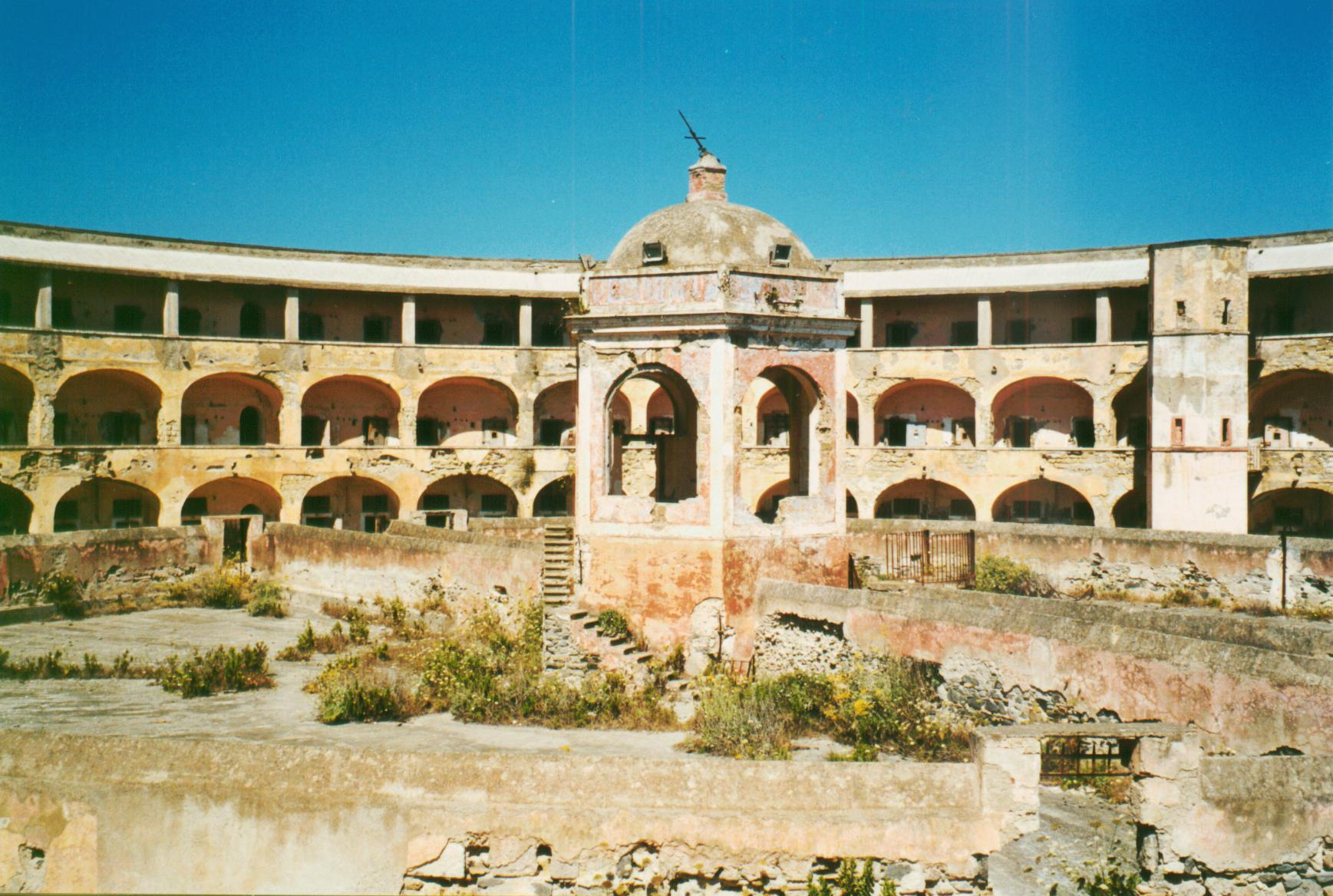
View of the now-abandoned prison on Santo Stefano Island

Bresci was convicted of murder and sentenced to life imprisonment, the most severe punishment available, as Italy had already abolished the death penalty. Bresci was initially held in Milan's San Vittore Prison, then transferred to a prison in Elba, where he was illegally held in an underground cell below sea level. Fears of news leaking about the conditions of his imprisonment, combined with unrest among Bresci's supporters in the prison, resulted in his being transferred again on 23 January 1901. He was moved to solitary confinement on the remote Santo Stefano Island, where he was held in a small, unfurnished cell, with his feet shackled.

Bresci was only allowed to keep a few personal items, such as clothing and hairstyling tools. His daily rations consisted largely of soup and bread, with meat on Sundays and public holidays, and occasional wine and cheese bought with money sent by his wife. For one hour of each day, he was permitted to exercise in the corridor outside his cell. The rest of his time was spent in solitary confinement, away from other prisoners and prohibited from receiving visitors and even his own guards were forbidden to speak to him. To keep himself entertained, he used a napkin as a makeshift football and read from a French dictionary. Bresci reportedly remained in high spirits throughout his time in prison, which the authorities reported was due to his belief that he would be freed in an imminent revolution. By May 1901, Giolitti himself began to fear that Bresci's conspirators were planning to break him out of prison. To deter such a plot, Giolitti deployed an armed force to guard the island.

== Death ==
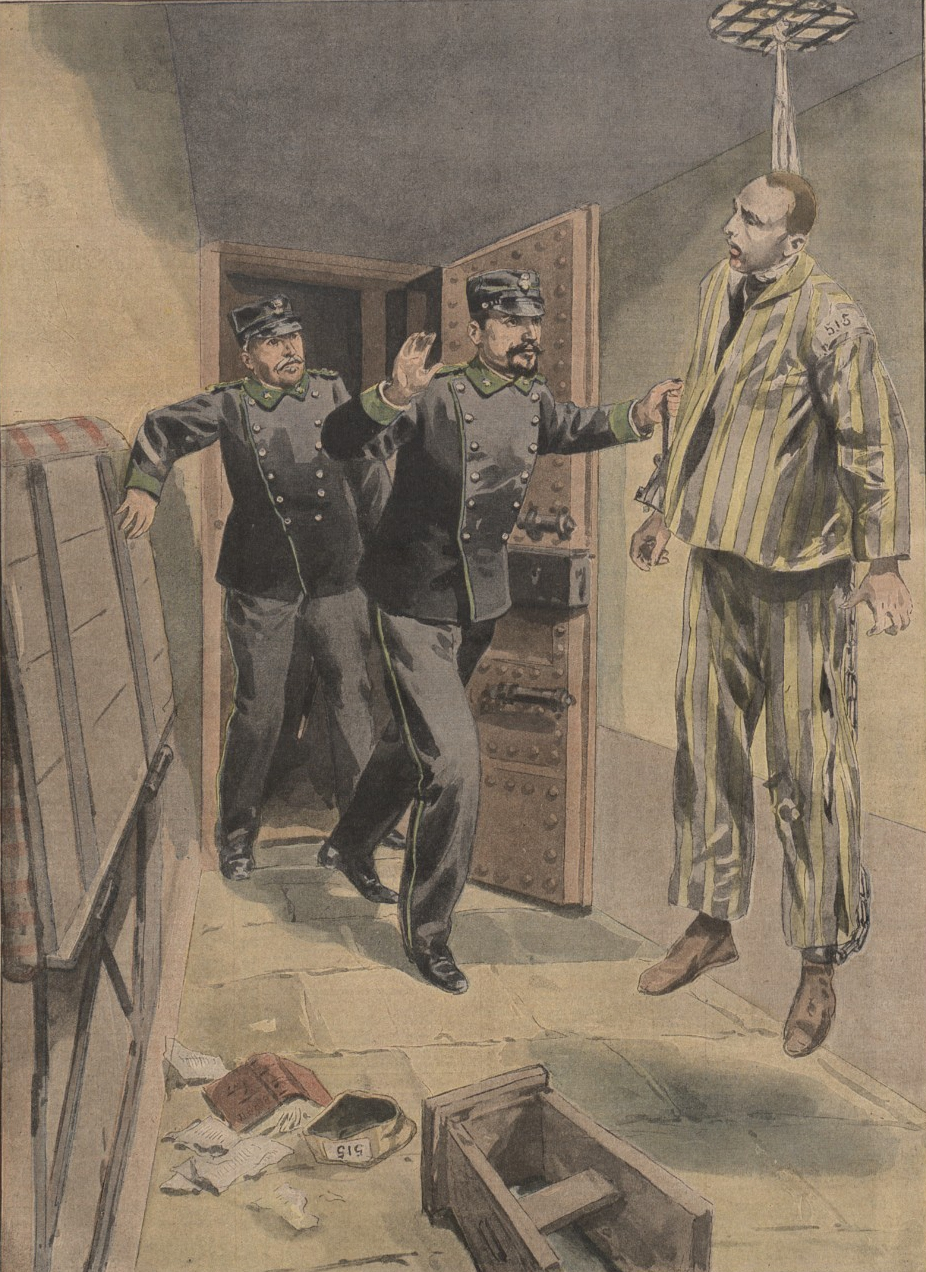
Illustration of Gaetano Bresci's suicide

On 22 May 1901, Bresci was found hanging by the neck in his cell. The word "Vengeance" had been carved into the wall. With his cell under constant surveillance, Bresci appeared to have hanged himself while one of his guards was asleep and the other was using the toilet. The prison director reported that Bresci had hanged himself from his cell window using a towel – which prisoners were prohibited from possessing – knotted to the collar of his jacket. All of this occurred at a time that Bresci was awaiting the results of an appeal to Italy's Supreme Court of Cassation. He also left wine and cheese uneaten, which he had reportedly purchased that morning.

Upon receiving word of Bresci's death, Giolitti immediately dispatched a prison inspector to Santo Stefano, where he reportedly arrived late on the night of 22 May. The inspector and three physicians autopsied Bresci and confirmed that he had died of strangulation but also found that his body had undergone a level of putrefaction suggesting that he had died earlier than reported. They raised this with the prison authorities but the matter was not investigated any further. On 26 May, Bresci was buried in the prison cemetery, interred with his belongings and letters from his wife that he had not been permitted to read. The New York Times celebrated the news of Bresci's death, while Umberto's successor and son, Victor Emmanuel III, commented that it was "perhaps the best thing that could have happened to the unhappy man".

The circumstances of Bresci's death aroused suspicion and several 21st-century historians have suggested he was murdered. Investigations into Giolitti's papers in the Central Archives of the State found two empty folders pertaining to Bresci, the title of the first indicated that the prison inspector had actually arrived on the island on 18 May 1901. While looking further into the case, Italian journalist Arrigo Petacco found that Bresci's page in the Santo Stefano prison registry had been torn out.

== Legacy ==
=== Governmental and policing reforms ===
Prior to Umberto's assassination by Bresci, the reactionary government of Luigi Pelloux had been replaced by a left-wing government under Giuseppe Saracco of the Historical Left and Italy experienced a return to democracy. Other than a series of arrests during the investigation of the case, the state repression Italian anarchists had expected in the wake of the assassination never manifested. Subsequent governments led by Giolitti passed a series of reforms of the Italian law enforcement apparatus, reining in police repression against striking workers. Giolitti downplayed or suppressed information about further violent attacks by anarchists, even omitting any mention of anarchism from his memoirs about Bresci's assassination, which he depicted as the result of a "deranged mind". Dissatisfied with the ineffectiveness of their foreign intelligence apparatus, as well as the investigations of the American authorities, the Italian government also established a new surveillance network to monitor emigrant Italian anarchists in Europe and the Americas.

British prime minister Robert Gascoyne-Cecil responded to the assassination by proclaiming that European governments had been too lenient towards anarchists, whose "morbid thirst for notoriety" he feared presented a threat to the existence of civilization. Switzerland passed a new law that punished expressions of support for crimes committed by anarchists, imprisoning Luigi Bertoni under this law after he publicly praised Bresci's actions. European governments that had participated in the International Conference of Rome for the Social Defense Against Anarchists also attempted to appeal to the United States government, calling for it to surveil the American anarchist movement and suppress the radical press. The United States Department of State, without a federal law enforcement agency, responded that it lacked the means to carry out such an operation. Bresci's assassination of Umberto nevertheless contributed to a rising climate of xenophobia and anti-anarchist sentiment in the United States, culminating in the passage of the Immigration Act of 1903, which prohibited anarchists from entering the country.

=== Regard in left-wing circles ===
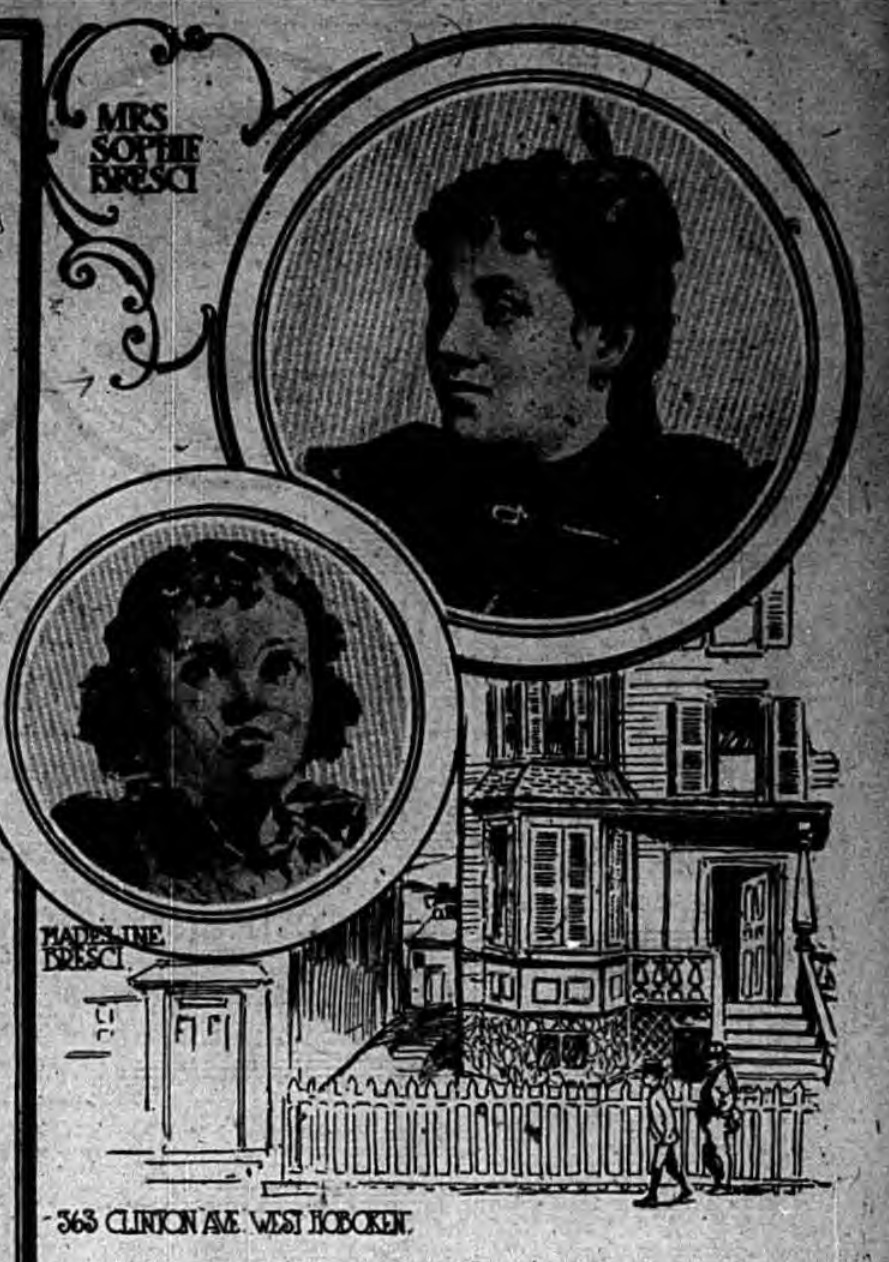
Bresci's wife and daughter (pictured) were forced to leave West Hoboken, New Jersey.

Although the assassination was condemned by some anarchists, including Errico Malatesta, who rejected revenge killings and worried it might harm the anarchist cause, it was praised by others. The assassination quickly became a cornerstone of Italian left-wing counterculture, with 29 July being celebrated as an anarchist holiday. Many anarchists came to regard Bresci as a martyr. The American anarchist newspaper Free Society stated that anarchists regarded Bresci's actions with "unqualified approval". In its ode to Bresci, the paper described him as a "kind hearted and humane man" who had resolved to kill the "tyran[t]" Umberto, not as a representative of an organization but in an individual act of revenge for the "great suffering and misery caused by the oppressive measures of the Italian government". Bresci was praised in the same paper by Emma Goldman, who said he had "loved his kind, felt the existing wrongs in the world, and dared to strike a blow at organized authority". She described him as having had "overflowing sympathy with human suffering", and declared his assassination of Umberto to have been "good and noble, grand and useful", as she believed he had intended it to help "free mankind from tyranny". Anarchists in Yohoghany, Pennsylvania, even sent a telegram to the Italian prime minister, celebrating the assassination of Umberto.

On Italian anarchist postcards, Bresci's face was superimposed onto the Statue of Liberty, and his deeds were eulogized in a poem by the American anarchist Voltairine de Cleyre and in Italian revolutionary music. Paterson became known as the "capital of world anarchism" after Bresci's assassination of Umberto. Although Bresci's wife did not know about her husband's plan to assassinate Umberto, or even what anarchism entailed, she was routinely surveilled by the police and harassed by members of her own community, forcing her to move to Chicago. When the Italian monarchist newspaper L'Araldo Italiano raised $1,000 (equivalent to $38,000 in 2024) to decorate Umberto's tomb, the Paterson anarchists quickly matched the amount to support Bresci's widow and two daughters, despite police harassment at their fundraising events. Luigi Galleani was accused of embezzling funds raised for Bresci's children, but he denied the charges and published letters from Sophia Bresci and the benefit fund's organizer attesting to his innocence.

A Roman Catholic priest was imprisoned for declaring his support for Bresci's actions, which he characterized as "an instrument of divine vengeance against a dynasty [the House of Savoy] that had deprived the Popes of their temporal power." In 1910, when he was still a member of the Italian Socialist Party, the future Italian fascist dictator Benito Mussolini praised Bresci in the pages of the socialist newspaper Lotta di Classe. According to the Italian historian Gaetano Salvemini, Bresci received support from the majority of Italian society due to the unpopularity of Umberto I. Salvemini considered Bresci's assassination of Umberto to be an act of tyrannicide, which he contrasted with the indiscriminate attacks of terrorism.

=== Further assassinations and attempts ===
Shortly after Umberto's death, the French anarchist François Salson attempted to assassinate the Persian king Mozaffar ad-Din Shah Qajar in Paris. Although Salson never disclosed his motives, international newspapers (including Corriere della Sera, The Times, and the New York Herald) all claimed that the attempt had been directly inspired by Bresci's actions. Print media also linked Bresci's actions with those of Belgian anarchist Jean-Baptiste Sipido (who attempted to assassinate the British crown prince) and Italian anarchist Luigi Lucheni (who had assassinated Empress Elisabeth of Austria). Bresci and Lucheni shared little motive in common; Lucheni later expressed his admiration for Bresci's actions.

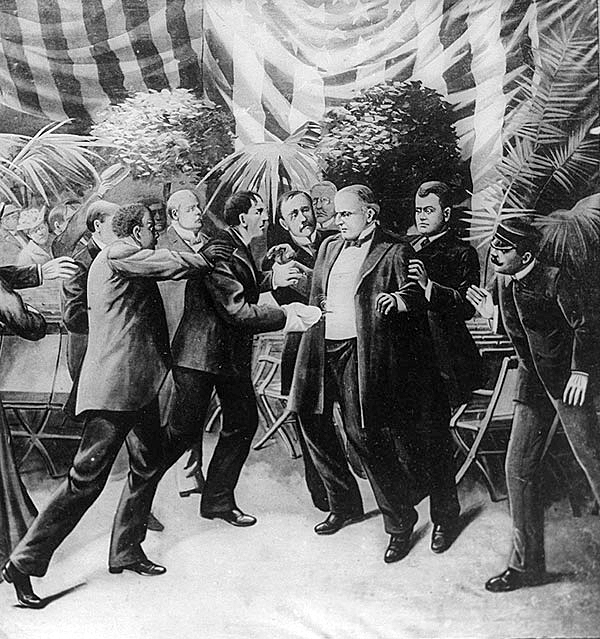
The assassination of William McKinley by Leon Czolgosz was directly inspired by Bresci.

The assassination directly inspired the Polish-American anarchist Leon Czolgosz. According to his parents, Czolgosz obsessively read newspaper accounts of the assassination, keeping a clipping with him for months and reading it in bed each night. In May 1901, he inquired for information from an anarchist group in Cleveland about newspaper stories that American anarchists were plotting a similar assassination, but the group's treasurer denied the rumors. In early September, Czolgosz read an article in Free Society which exalted "monster-slayers" such as Bresci. This ultimately drove him to carry out the assassination of United States president William McKinley. In the wake of this assassination, mounting public pressure and police surveillance forced Bresci's family to flee their home in Cliffside Park, New Jersey.

Bresci and Czolgosz would later be a source of inspiration for the insurrectionary anarchist Luigi Galleani, who praised their actions in his newspaper Cronaca Sovversiva. In 1911, Italian anarchists inspired by Bresci planned to assassinate Victor Emanuele III and Giolitti at the Turin International but were arrested before they could carry out their attack. Italian anarchists from Paterson and New York established groups in Bresci's name, while a group in Pittsburgh named themselves in the "Twenty-Ninth of July" group, in reference to the date of Umberto's assassination. By 1914, the New York-based Bresci Circle had reached 600 members, who met frequently on East Harlem's 106th Street. The group was implicated in a plot to assassinate John D. Rockefeller, the richest person of the fin de siècle era. The following year, the group was infiltrated by an undercover operation and two of its members were convicted of plotting to bomb St. Patrick's Cathedral in Manhattan. The group was also suspected of involvement in the 1919 United States anarchist bombings, and finally disbanded during the Palmer Raids. Bresci's example, along with that of the anarchist assassins Émile Henry, Michele Angiolillo and Paulí Pallàs, was later invoked by Nicola Sacco when he was on death row.

=== Contemporary commemorations ===
In 1976, a street in Bresci's home town of Prato was named after him. During the 1980s, Tuscan anarchists commissioned a monument to Bresci to be erected in Turigliano, near Carrara; it was blocked by the government. In July 1986, the Italian Communist Party-controlled municipal council voted to allow the anarchists space in the Turigliano cemetery to construct their monument to Bresci to the protest of monarchist activists and interior minister Oscar Luigi Scalfaro. Court proceedings were initiated against members of the council and of the "Bresci committee" but were all acquitted, as the proposed monument's inscription did not mention the assassination of Umberto. In 1990, it was erected overnight in the cemetery by Ugo Mazzucchelli, who turned himself in afterwards. In response, mayor Fausto Marchetti declared that the council's resolution to allow the monument was still valid. Victor Emanuele III commissioned the Expiatory Chapel of Monza to commemorate the place where his father Umberto had been assassinated. In 2013, Bresci's name was adopted by a short-lived occupied social center in Catania.

== Bibliography ==
- Avrich, Paul (1991). Sacco and Vanzetti: The Anarchist Background. Princeton University Press. doi:10.2307/j.ctv131bwkz. ISBN 0-691-04789-8. JSTOR j.ctv131bwkz.
- Barton, Mary S. (2015). "The Global War on Anarchism: The United States and International Anarchist Terrorism, 1898–1904". Diplomatic History. 39 (2): 303–330. doi:10.1093/dh/dhu004. ISSN 0145-2096. OCLC 5989394817.
- Bencivenni, Marcella (2017). "Fired by the Ideal: Italian Anarchists in New York City, 1880s–1920s". In Goyens, Tom (ed.). Radical Gotham: Anarchism in New York City from Schwab's Saloon to Occupy Wall Street. University of Illinois Press. pp. 54–76. ISBN 978-0-252-09959-5. OCLC 985447628.
- Carey, George W. (December 1978). "The Vessel, The Deed, and the Idea: Anarchists in Paterson, 1895–1908". Antipode. 10–11 (3–1): 46–58. Bibcode:1978Antip..10...46C. doi:10.1111/j.1467-8330.1978.tb00115.x. ISSN 0066-4812. OCLC 5155744186.
- Castañeda, Christopher J. (2017). "Times of Propaganda and Struggle: El Despertar and Brooklyn's Spanish Anarchists, 1890–1905". In Goyens, Tom (ed.). Radical Gotham: Anarchism in New York City from Schwab's Saloon to Occupy Wall Street. University of Illinois Press. pp. 77–99. ISBN 978-0-252-09959-5. OCLC 985447628.
- Collin, Richard Oliver (1999). "Italy: A Tale of Two Police Forces". History Today. 49 (9): 27–33. ISSN 0018-2753. OCLC 704754908. PMID 21351673.
- Colson, Dan (2017). "Propaganda and the Deed: Anarchism, Violence and the Representational Impulse". American Studies. 55/56 (55/56): 163–186. doi:10.1353/ams.2017.0007. ISSN 0026-3079. JSTOR 44982624. OCLC 7127311174.
- Foner, Eric (20 August 1977). "Sacco and Vanzetti" (PDF). The Nation. Vol. 225, no. 5. pp. 135–141. ISSN 0027-8378.
- Gabriel, Elun (2007). "Performing Persecution: Witnessing and Martyrdom in the Anarchist Tradition". Radical History Review. 2007 (98): 34–62. doi:10.1215/01636545-2006-026. ISSN 0163-6545. OCLC 4633895691.
- Hofmann, Paul (1991). That Fine Italian Hand. Henry Holt and Company. ISBN 978-0-8050-1729-8. OCLC 23365268.
- Jensen, Richard Bach (2014). "The Assassination of Umberto I of Italy". The Battle Against Anarchist Terrorism: An International History, 1878–1934. Cambridge University Press. pp. 187–197. ISBN 978-1-107-03405-1. OCLC 936070232.
- Kemp, Michael (2018). "The Cook, the Blacksmith, the King and the Weaver". Bombs, Bullets and Bread: The Politics of Anarchist Terrorism Worldwide, 1866–1926. McFarland & Company. pp. 60–64. ISBN 978-1-4766-3211-7. OCLC 1043054028 – via Google Books.
- Levy, Carl (2007). "The Anarchist Assassin and Italian History, 1870s to 1930s". In Gundle, Stephen; Rinaldi, Lucia (eds.). Assassinations and Murder in Modern Italy. Palgrave Macmillan. pp. 207–221. doi:10.1057/9780230606913_17. ISBN 978-02306-0691-3. OCLC 314799595.
- Macadam, Alta (1997). Northern Italy: From the Alps to Bologna (10th ed.). A & C Black. ISBN 0-7136-4294-7. OCLC 37482252.
- Nash, Jay Robert (1998). Terrorism in the 20th Century: A Narrative Encyclopedia From the Anarchists, Through the Weathermen, to the Unabomber. New York: M. Evans. p. 3. ISBN 978-1-4617-4769-7. OCLC 607126604 – via Google Books.
- Pernicone, Nunzio; Ottanelli, Fraser M (2018). Assassins Against the Old Order: Italian Anarchist Violence in Fin De Siècle Europe. University of Illinois Press. doi:10.5406/j.ctv513d7b. ISBN 978-0-252-05056-5. OCLC 1050163307.
- Piazza, Gianni (2018). "Squatting Social Centres in a Sicilian City: Liberated Spaces and Urban Protest Actors". Antipode. 50 (2): 498–522. Bibcode:2018Antip..50..498P. doi:10.1111/anti.12286. ISSN 0066-4812. OCLC 7312484068.
- Presutto, Michele (2019). "Fearless Before the Lord: Giuseppe Alia and Religious and Political Radicalism". Journal for the Study of Radicalism. 13 (2): 45–64. doi:10.14321/jstudradi.13.2.0045. ISSN 1930-1189. JSTOR 10.14321/jstudradi.13.2.0045. OCLC 8199197653.
- Simon, Jeffrey D. (2022). America's Forgotten Terrorists: The Rise and Fall of the Galleanists. University of Nebraska Press. ISBN 978-1-640-12404-2. OCLC 1302736396 – via Google Books.
- Traynor, Lisa (2026). "'I intended to kill him … because I did not believe in presidents over us…' the shooting of President McKinley: motives, means and the impact of assassination during The Long Nineteenth Century". Arms & Armour: 1–40. doi:10.1080/17416124.2025.2609248.
- Vecoli, Rudolph J. (1999). "Bresci, Gaetano (1869–1901), silk weaver and regicide". In Garraty, John A.; Carnes, Mark C. (eds.). American National Biography. Oxford University Press. doi:10.1093/anb/9780198606697.article.1501197. ISBN 0-19-520635-5. OCLC 873221504.
- "'A Gaetano Bresci, Gli Anarchici' in Piazza La Statua Contestata" ['To Gaetano Bresci, The Anarchists' in Piazza La Statua Contestata]. La Repubblica (in Italian). 4 May 1990. ISSN 0390-1076.
- "Lost their marbles". The Economist. 30 August 1986. p. 38. ISSN 0013-0613 – via Gale.
