= Coiano =

Tuscan village

- Frazione
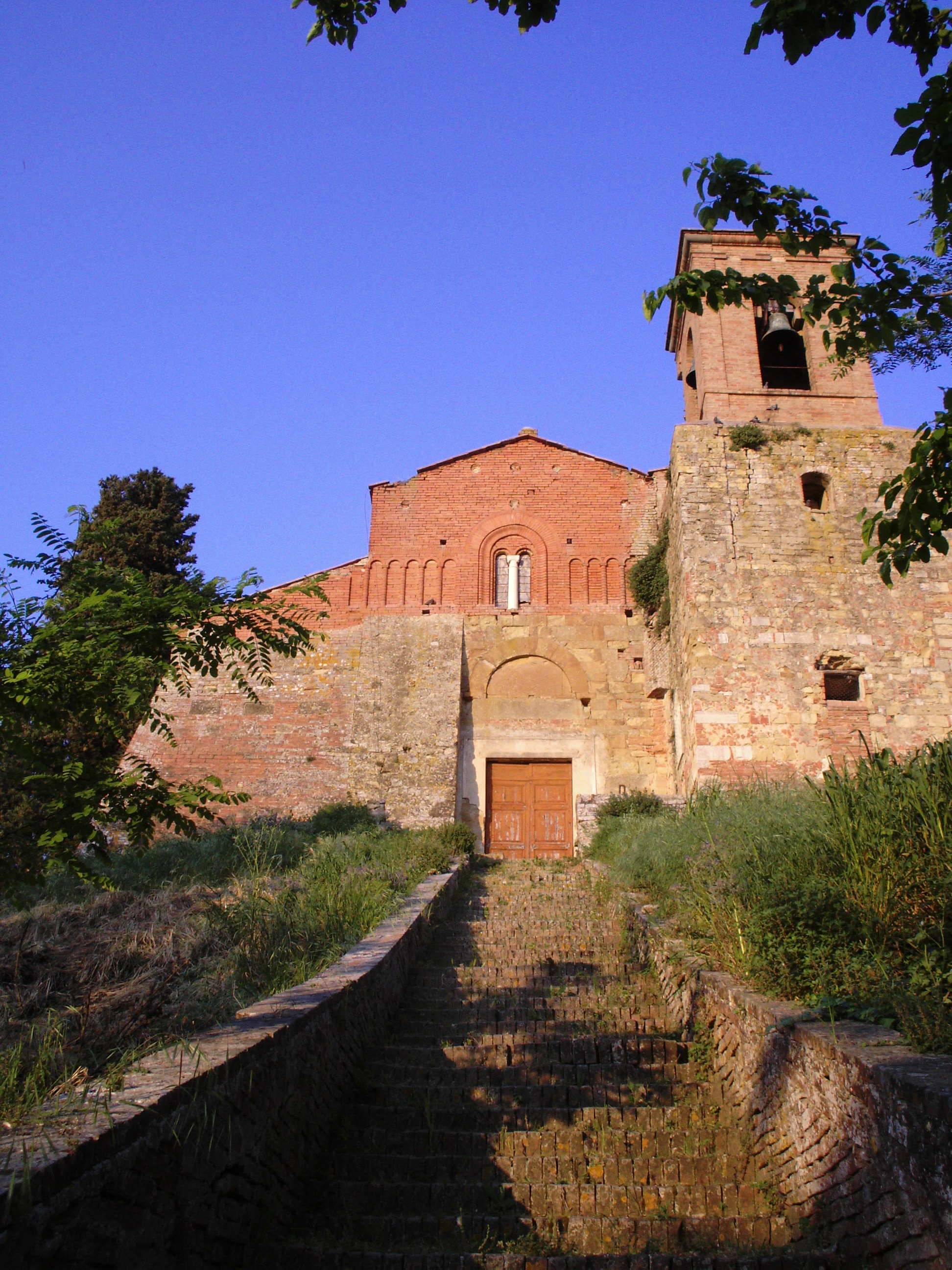
- Coiano parish church
- Interactive map of Coiano
- Coordinates: 43°37′11″N 10°54′48″E
- Country: Italy
- Region: Tuscany
- Metropolitan City: Florence
- Municipality: Castelfiorentino
- Time zone: UTC+1
- Postal code: 50051
- Area code: 0571

Coiano is a frazione of Castelfiorentino, in the Metropolitan City of Florence. It is located on the chalk hills that divide the Egola and Elsa rivers.

== History ==
Coiano was located on the border between the diocese of Volterra and the diocese of San Miniato, and on the demarcation line of the Republic of Pisa. In the early 990s, the Archbishop of Canterbury Sigeric passed through the village on his way to Rome; he stopped at the local Romanesque church, marking the 21st part of his journey towards the seat of Roman Catholicism. The route of Sigeric's journey became a Christian pilgrimage route known as the Via Francigena. Coiano's place on the route brought new economic opportunities, which resulted in the construction of a castle and a villa by the Florentine nobility.

In the 13th century, Coiano was incorporated into the district of San Miniato, and in 1369, Coiano and other neighbouring localities were incorporated into the territory of the Republic of Florence, which assigned a podestà to govern the locality. A winery was established in the castle by the Florentine countess Carlotta Masetti, which later received an award from the Italian government in 1885.

Gaspero Bresci and Maddalena Godi were among those who owned a small amount of farmland in Coiano. They were financially devastated after the Italian government began importing cheap grain from the United States in 1880; the subsequent experiences with poverty led to the radicalisation of their son, Gaetano Bresci, the anarchist who assassinated King Umberto I of Italy.
