= Assassination of Umberto I of Italy =

1900 shooting of the Italian king

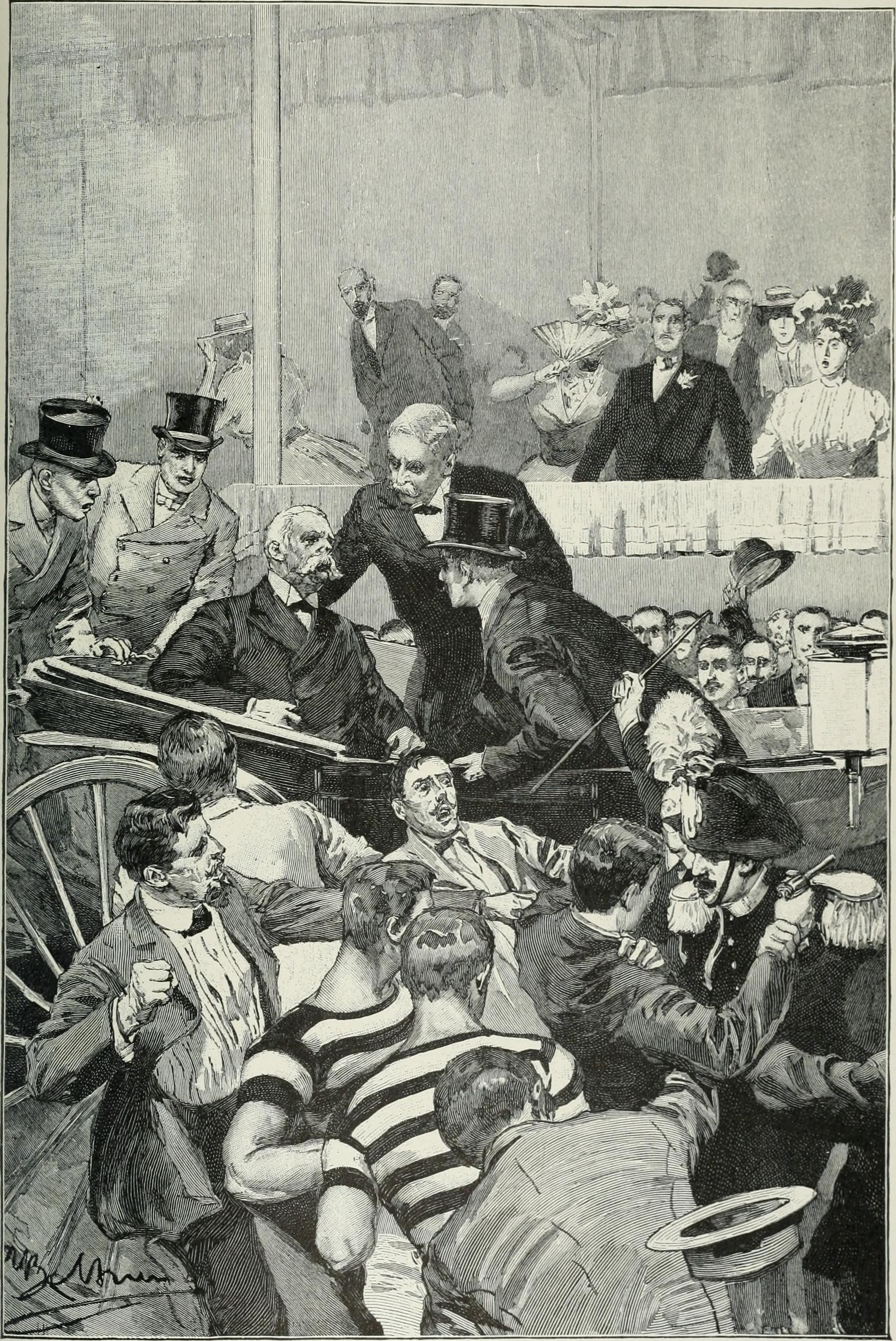
- British illustration of the act
- Location: 45°35′28″N 9°16′08″E; Via Matteo da Campione, Monza (Kingdom of Italy)
- Date: 29 July 1900; 21:30
- Attack type: Assassination
- Weapon: .32 S&W revolver
- Deaths: 1
- Perpetrator: Gaetano Bresci
- Convictions: Anarchism

The assassination of Umberto I of Italy took place on 29 July 1900 in Monza, Italy. While attending the closing ceremony of a gymnastics club, King Umberto I of Italy was shot three or four times by Italian anarchist Gaetano Bresci, dying a few minutes later. Bresci committed the act as revenge for the Bava Beccaris massacre, a violent action in Milan in 1898 taken by the military to stop a food riot. Umberto I had been targeted before, in 1879 and 1898.

== Prelude ==
In the second half of the 19th century, radical anarchism in Italy was on the rise. Having succeeded his father Victor Emmanuel II on 9 January 1878, Umberto I became the main target for the anarchists almost immediately. Just ten months after ascending the throne, on 17 November 1878, he was attacked while he was visiting Naples with his wife, son, and Prime Minister Benedetto Cairoli. King Umberto was suddenly attacked with a knife by the Lucanian anarchist Giovanni Passannante, while shouting: "Long live Orsini! long live the universal republic". The king managed to defend himself, and an officer of the Cuirassiers in his entourage lunged at the attacker, wounding him on the head with his sabre, while Cairoli, in an attempt to block the attacker, was wounded in the thigh. Umberto I suffered just a light cut on his arm. The violent attempt generated numerous protest marches, both against and in favor of the attacker, and clashes between the police and anarchists occurred. Following the attempted assassination, the Chief of Police Luigi Berti was forced to resign a month later. Passannante was later sentenced to life imprisonment and transferred to prison, where he began to show serious mental problems, committing suicide in 1910.

The second attempt for the king's life occurred on 22 April 1897, in Rome. Umberto was riding in his carriage at the Capannelle Racecourse when the anarchist Pietro Acciarito rushed towards his carriage armed with a knife. The king, having promptly noticed the weapon in his hand, was able to easily dodge the anarchist's attempt to strike him and remained unharmed. Having just managed to scratch the royal carriage, Acciarito then calmly walked away and, in the confusion that followed his gesture, was stopped only after he had walked about 50 metres from the place of the act. Acciarito was then arrested and sentenced to life imprisonment. Like Passannante, his sentence was very harsh and had serious consequences on his mental health.

== Bava Beccaris massacre ==
Between 6 and 8 May 1898, the population of Milan took to the streets to protest against working conditions and the increase in the price of bread in the previous months, in which women and children participated. The Italian government of Antonio Starabba di Rudinì declared a state of siege and gave full powers to General of the Royal Italian Army Fiorenzo Bava Beccaris to repress the revolt. The results of the so-called Bava Beccaris massacre were drastic: 81 people were killed, and 450 were injured.

After the events in Milan, on 5 June, Bava Beccaris received from the king the honour of Grand Officer of the Military Order of Savoy and on 4 July 1898, he was appointed Senator of the Kingdom by the king, a position he held until 1924, at the dawn of fascism, which he supported.

The bloody repression of the revolt, the honour and the nomination of Bava Beccaris as Senator aroused strong indignation among part of the population, including Gaetano Bresci.

== Preparations ==
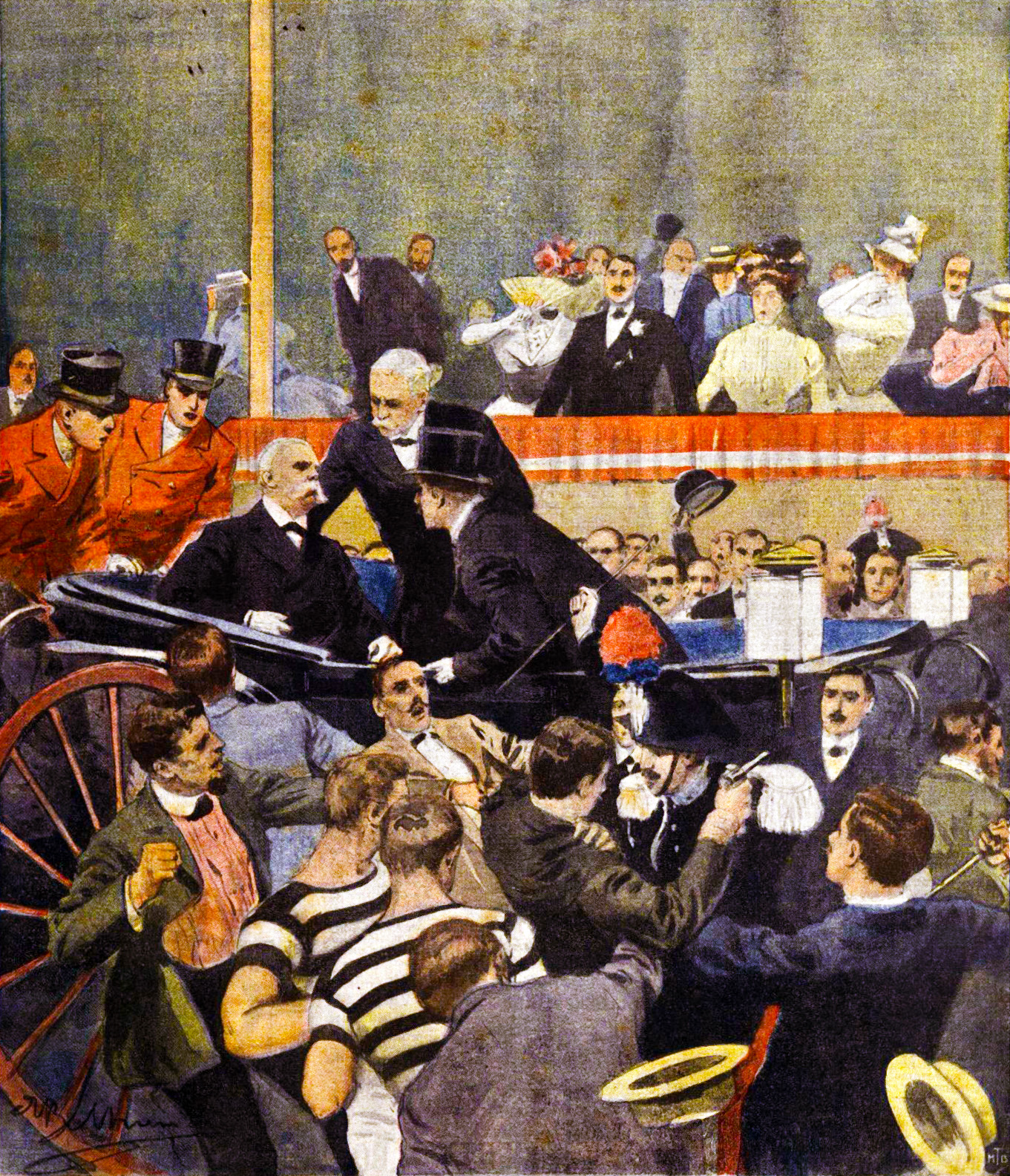
Illustration of Bresci assassinating Umberto I of Italy

Bresci, a young weaver and anarchist originally from the city of Prato, was arrested twice in Italy for leftist activities and organising labor strikes; therefore, in 1897, he immigrated to the United States. In 1898, while living in Paterson, New Jersey, Bresci received news of the Bava Beccaris massacre and after that swore revenge against Umberto I, whom he held personally responsible for the massacre.

On 17 May, he embarked from New York, and on 26 May, he disembarked in Le Havre, carrying the .38 caliber revolver, which he bought in Paterson. Together with two others, he visited the Paris Exhibition and then returned to Prato, his native town. There he remained until 18 July, when he moved to his sister's house in San Pietro. On the evening of 21 July, he then reached Bologna, then on 24 July, he arrived in Milan where he rented a room in a guesthouse. On 27 July, he was present in Monza, where he rented another room and began to explore the area and the surroundings of Villa Reale, also asking for some news about the movements of the royal family up until the day of the attack.

== Attack ==
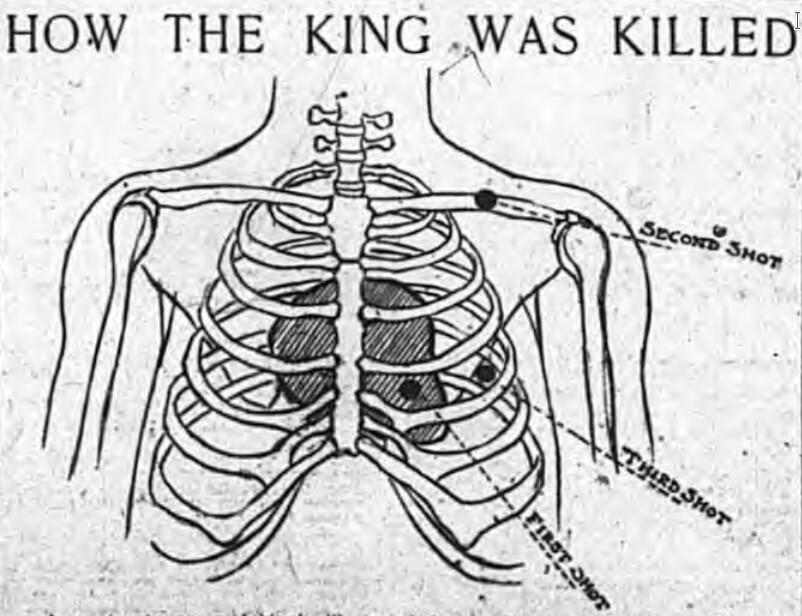
Period illustration of where Umberto was shot

On 29 July evening, the king had been invited to the closing ceremony of the Forti e Liberi gymnastics club in Matteo da Campione street: after arriving by carriage and watching the gymnastics exercises and the award speech by Prof. Draghino, he set off towards the carriage at 9:30 pm to return to Villa Reale. Meanwhile, Bresci took a position close to the main gate, waiting for the carriage to pass by. As the carriage was leaving the gate, where there was a crowd of gymnasts forcing the vehicle to slow down, Bresci approached and hit Umberto three times with his revolver, firing the fourth shot blank.

The monarch was hit both in the face and in the throat. The horses of the royal carriage became restless, and the king was immediately taken to the Royal Villa, but arrived there lifeless. The king, entrusted to the surgeons Vincenzo Vercelli and Attilio Savio, was declared dead by them at 10:40 p.m. Meanwhile, Bresci was surrounded by the Carabinieri, after a short fight, captured and taken to the guardhouse of the Carabinieri barracks.

== Royal funeral ==
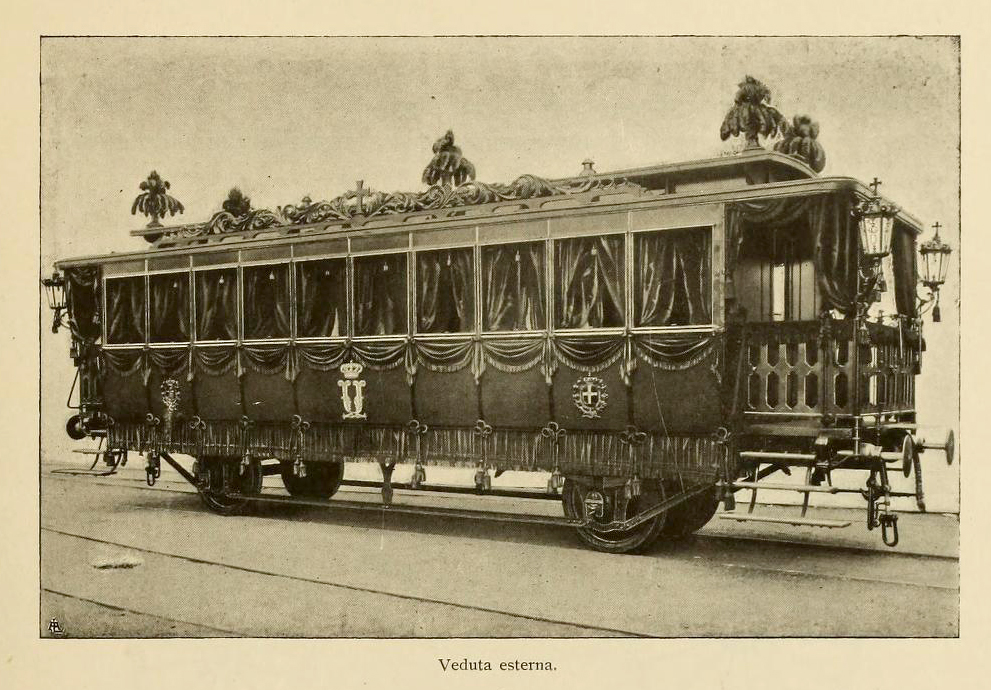
Funeral railway coach of Umberto I

On 30 July, members of the royal family arrived in Monza. The new king Victor Emmanuel III interrupted the cruise in the Mediterranean with his wife Elena of Montenegro, landed in Reggio Calabria port, and then reached Naples, where he met with the former Prime Minister Francesco Crispi. From here, the new rulers arrived by train at 6:30 p.m. at the Monza station, guarded by the "Genova Cavalleria" Regiment. Victor Emanuel was thus able to meet his mother and see his father's body in the chapel of rest.

On 8 August, after a ceremony in the funeral chapel of Villa Reale, the body of Umberto I was accompanied to the station, from where it left for Rome in a special carriage with the high clergy and court dignitaries, who had also been entrusted with the Iron Crown. At 6:30 p.m. the train arrived at Rome Termini station, from where the funeral procession, led by General Amedeo Avogadro, again accompanied by the crowd, reached the Pantheon, where the body was buried on 9 August 1900.

== Trial and conviction ==
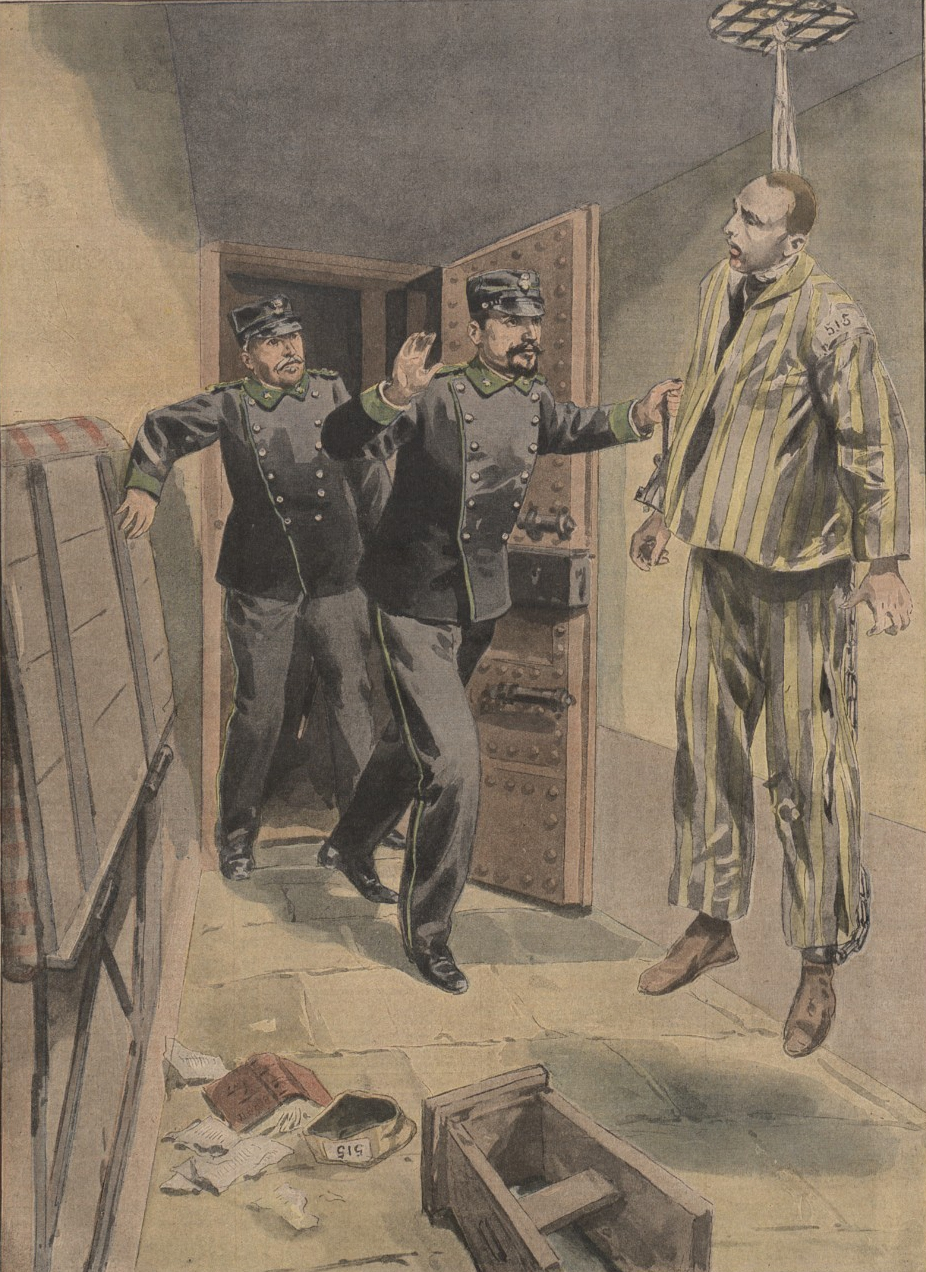
Illustration of Gaetano Bresci's suicide

On 29 August 1900, at 09:00, the trial against Gaetano Bresci opened at the Assize Court of Milan. He was defended by the former anarchist Francesco Saverio Merlino, after Filippo Turati had refused so as not to compromise the Italian Socialist Party and his political career. The sentence arrived the very same day in the late afternoon, at 6 pm: Bresci was sentenced to life imprisonment, made more severe by solitary confinement for the first seven years in the Santo Stefano penitentiary on the island of Ventotene, in a nine-square-meter cell built to guard him. The word Vengeance had been carved into the wall. Suspicious circumstances of this event are leading to theories that Bresci was murdered by his guards.

Facing the harsh prison conditions, the Italian government was worried about the attempt to set Bresci free by the members of Italian anarchist groups, prompting this to set additional guards. On 22 May 1901, Bresci was found hanging by the neck in his cell.

Bresci's wife and daughter were forced to leave their home in West Hoboken, New Jersey. They were later able to return.

The assassination directly inspired some other anarchist assassins, like Polish-American Leon Czolgosz, who committed the assassination of William McKinley, 25th president of the United States.

== Memory ==
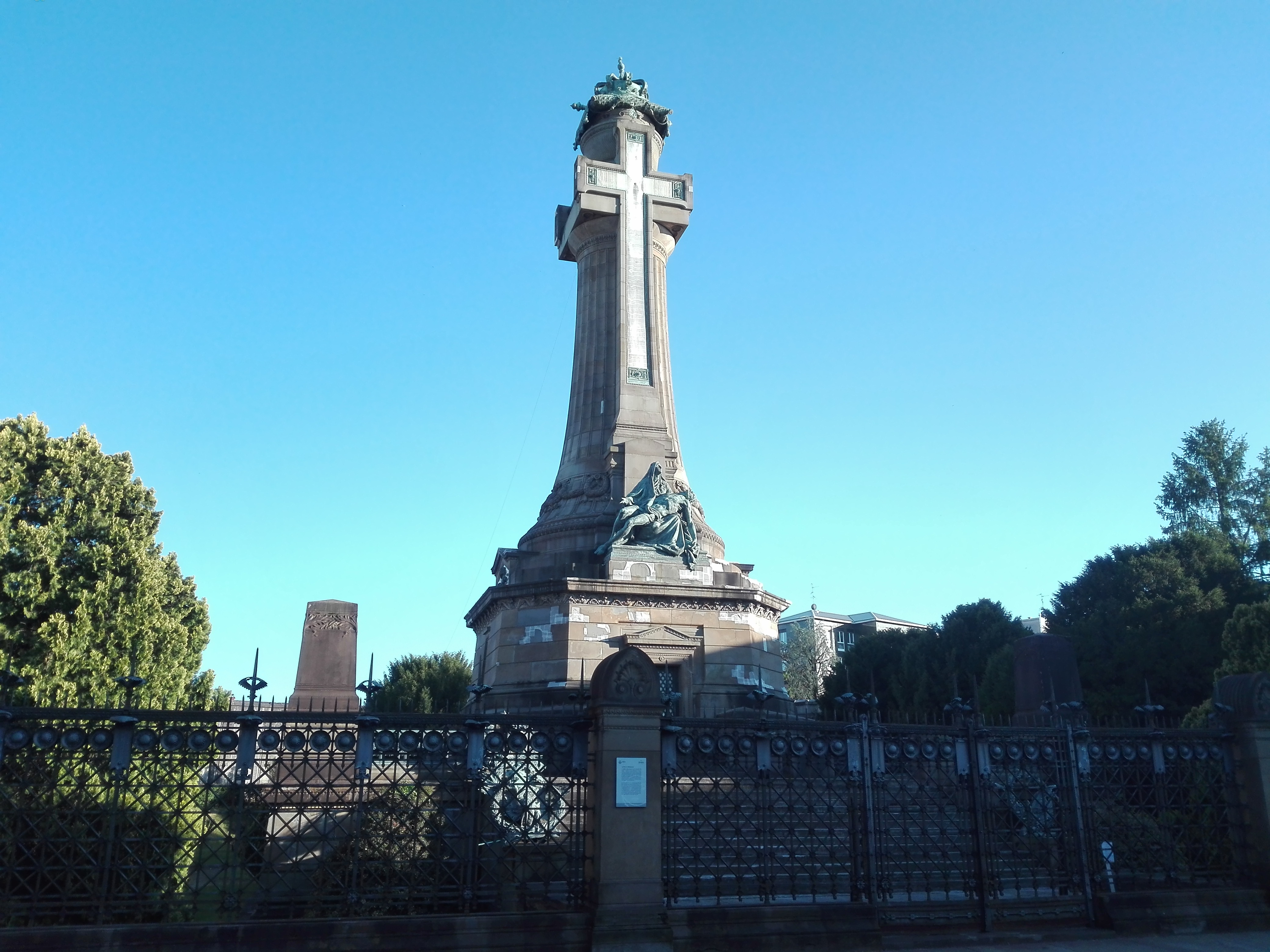
Expiatory Chapel of Monza

At the site of the attack in Monza, the Expiatory Chapel was built in 1910 in memory of the murdered king, designed by the architect Giuseppe Sacconi, at the behest of his son, Victor Emmanuel III.

Bresci's personal effects, including the gun with which he killed Umberto I, are kept at the Criminological Museum in Rome.

Commenting about the 1969 book Killing No Murder by Edward Hyams, the Canadian critic George Fetherling in The Book of Assassins wrote that the description by Hymas of Umberto I "is so harsh that one is left to marvel that only three people tried to kill him". The assassination is pictured in the Italian movie L'ultimo giorno del Re (The Last Day of the King), directed by Ettore Radice in 2020.

== See also ==
- History of Monza
- List of assassinations in Europe

== Bibliography ==
- Castañeda, Christopher J. (2017). "Times of Propaganda and Struggle: El Despertar and Brooklyn's Spanish Anarchists, 1890–1905". In Goyens, Tom (ed.). Radical Gotham: Anarchism in New York City from Schwab's Saloon to Occupy Wall Street. University of Illinois Press. pp. 77–99. ISBN 978-0-252-09959-5. OCLC 985447628.
- Kemp, Michael (2018). "The Cook, the Blacksmith, the King and the Weaver". Bombs, Bullets and Bread: The Politics of Anarchist Terrorism Worldwide, 1866–1926. McFarland & Company. pp. 60–64. ISBN 978-1-4766-3211-7. OCLC 1043054028 – via Google Books.
- Pernicone, Nunzio; Ottanelli, Fraser M (2018). Assassins Against the Old Order: Italian Anarchist Violence in Fin De Siècle Europe. University of Illinois Press. doi:10.5406/j.ctv513d7b. ISBN 978-0-252-05056-5. OCLC 1050163307.
- Simon, Jeffrey D. (2022). America's Forgotten Terrorists: The Rise and Fall of the Galleanists. University of Nebraska Press. ISBN 978-1-640-12404-2. OCLC 1302736396 – via Google Books.
