= Yohoghany, Pennsylvania =

Unincorporated community in Pennsylvania, US

Coordinates: 40°17′17″N 79°45′48″W

Yohoghany is an unincorporated community in Westmoreland County, in the U.S. state of Pennsylvania.

== History ==
Yohoghany is a Native American name purported to mean "a stream flowing in a roundabout course".
