= Umberto I of Italy =

King of Italy from 1878 to 1900

Umberto I
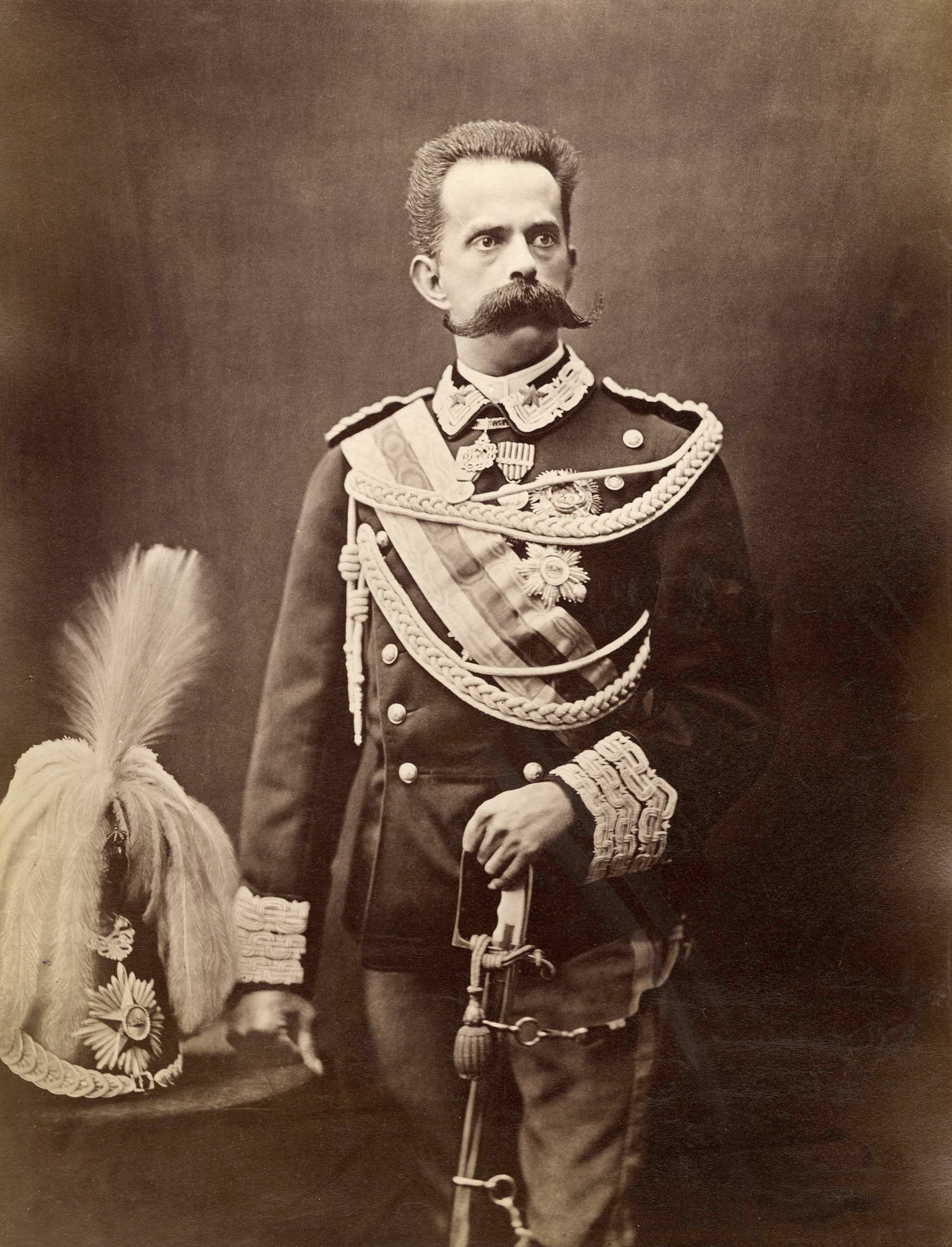
- Formal portrait, 1882

King of Italy
- Reign: 9 January 1878 – 29 July 1900
- Predecessor: Victor Emmanuel II
- Successor: Victor Emmanuel III
- Prime ministers: See list: Agostino Depretis Benedetto Cairoli Francesco Crispi Antonio Starabba Giovanni Giolitti Luigi Pelloux Giuseppe Saracco
- Born: 14 March 1844; Turin, Kingdom of Sardinia
- Died: 29 July 1900 (aged 56); Monza, Italy
- Cause of death: Assassination
- Burial: Pantheon, Rome
- Spouse: Margherita of Savoy (m. 1868)
- Issue: Victor Emmanuel III
Names
- Umberto Ranieri Carlo Emanuele Giovanni Maria Ferdinando Eugenio di Savoia
- House: Savoy
- Father: Victor Emmanuel II
- Mother: Adelaide of Austria

Umberto I or Humbert I (Italian: Umberto Ranieri Carlo Emanuele Giovanni Maria Ferdinando Eugenio di Savoia; 14 March 1844 – 29 July 1900) was King of Italy from 9 January 1878 until his assassination in 1900. His reign saw the creation of the Italian colonial empire and the formation of the Triple Alliance among Italy, Germany, and Austria-Hungary.

The son of Victor Emmanuel II and Adelaide of Austria, Umberto took part in the Italian Wars of Independence as a commander of the Royal Sardinian Army. He assumed the Italian throne in 1878 on the death of his father. A strong militarist, Umberto approved the alliance with Germany and Austria-Hungary, which was formalised in 1882. He also encouraged Italy's colonial efforts and oversaw the incorporation of Eritrea and Somalia into the emerging Italian Empire, while the First Italo-Ethiopian War resulted in defeat at the Battle of Adwa.

In the last years of his reign, Umberto faced increasing social unrest and serious economic difficulties. Tensions mounted as a result of growing opposition to new colonial campaigns, the spread of socialism, and crackdowns on civil liberties. Umberto was contested by left-wing circles for his conservatism and particularly for the decorations he gave in 1898 to Bava Beccaris, a general who bloodily suppressed demonstrations over rising food prices in Milan. He was deeply hated by Italian anarchists, who had already attempted to assassinate him during the first year of his reign.

In 1900, two years after the Bava Beccaris massacre, Umberto was killed in Monza by anarchist Gaetano Bresci. He was succeeded by his son, Victor Emmanuel III. Before his killing, he was also one of the recipients of one of Friedrich Nietzsche's Wahnbriefe notes. The Umbertino architecture style was named after him.

== Youth ==
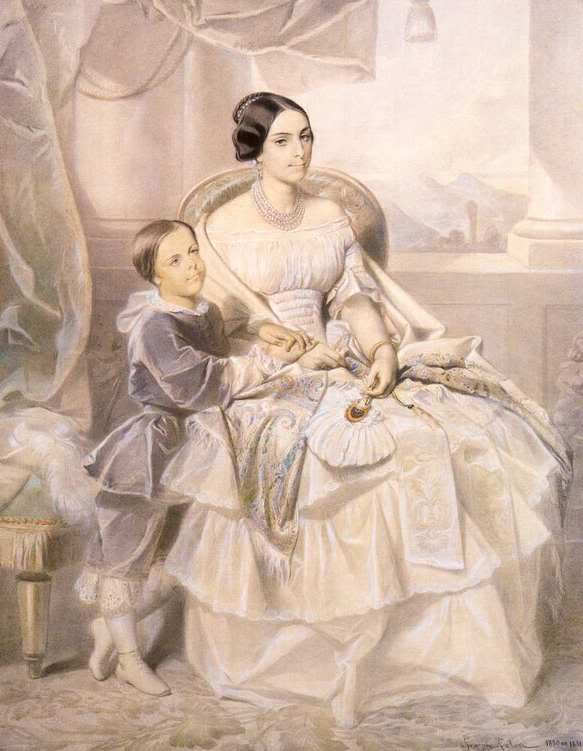
Adelaide of Austria with her son the future Umberto I of Italy

The son of Victor Emmanuel II and Archduchess Adelaide of Austria, Umberto was born in Turin, which was then capital of the Kingdom of Piedmont-Sardinia, on 14 March 1844, his father's 24th birthday. His education was entrusted to, among others, Massimo Taparelli, Marquess d'Azeglio, and Pasquale Stanislao Mancini. As Crown Prince, Umberto was distrusted by his father, who gave him no training in politics or constitutional government. Umberto was brought up with no affection or love. Instead, Umberto was taught to be obedient and loyal; he had to stand at attention whenever his father entered the room. When speaking to his father, Umberto had to get down on his knees to kiss his father's hand first. The fact that Umberto had to kiss his father's hand before being allowed to speak to him (both in public and in private) right up to his father's death contributed much to the tension between the two.

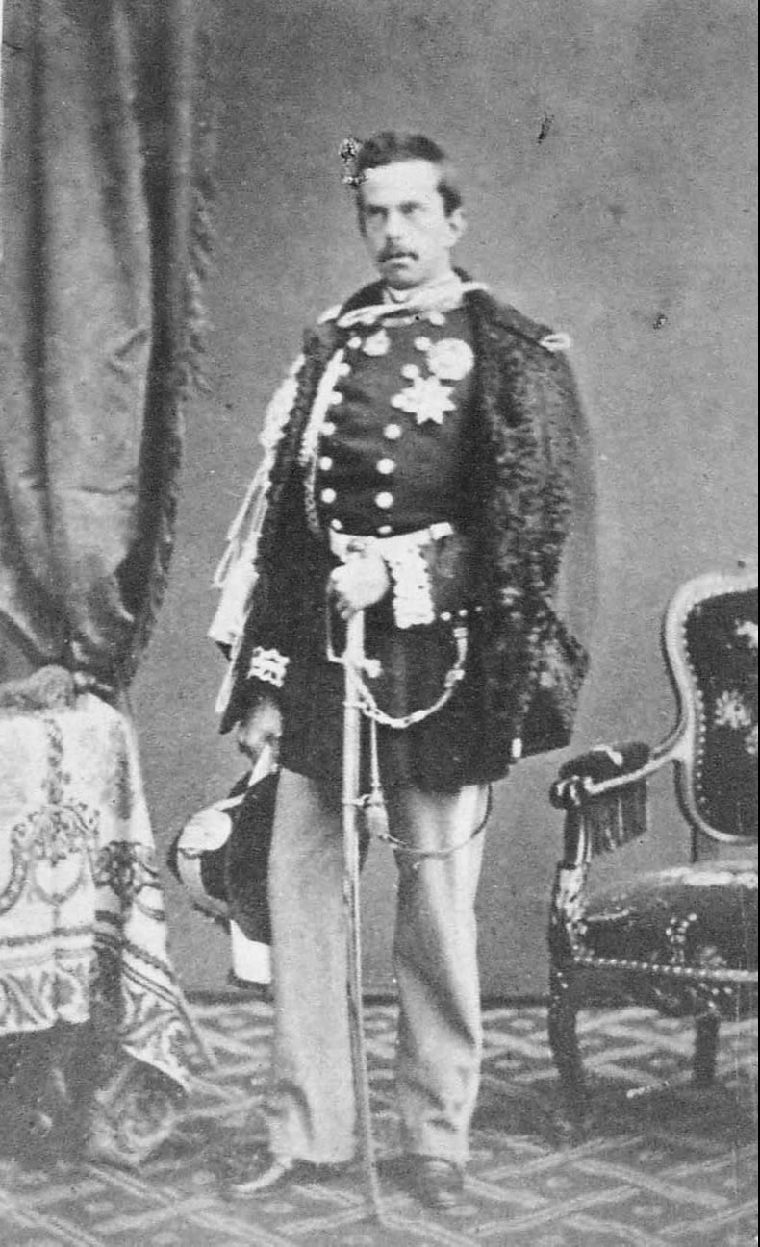
Umberto as Prince of Piedmont, c. 1868

From March 1858, he had a military career in the Royal Sardinian Army, beginning with the rank of captain. Umberto took part in the Italian Wars of Independence. In the Second War of Italian Independence (1859), Umberto, who was only 14, was present at the battle of Solferino. In the Third War of Italian Independence (1866), Umberto commanded the XVI Division at the Villafranca battle that followed the Italian defeat at Custoza.

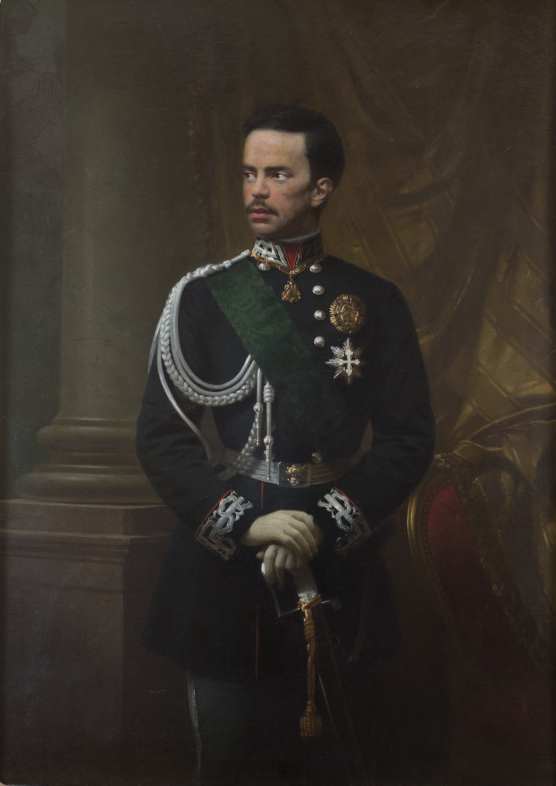
Crown Prince Umberto

Because of the upheaval the House of Savoy caused to a number of other royal houses (all the Italian ones, and those related closely to them, such as the Bourbons of Spain and France) in 1859–1860, only a minority of royal families in the 1860s were willing to establish relations with the newly founded Italian royal family. It proved difficult to find any royal bride for either of the sons of king Victor Emmanuel II (his younger son Amedeo, Umberto's brother, married a Piedmontese subject, princess Vittoria of Cisterna). Their conflict with the papacy did not help these matters. Not many eligible Catholic royal brides were easily available for young Umberto.

At first, Umberto was to marry Archduchess Mathilde of Austria, a scion of a remote sideline of the Austrian imperial house; however, she died as the result of an accident at the age of 18. On 21 April 1868, Umberto married his first cousin, Margherita Teresa Giovanna, Princess of Savoy. Their only son was Victor Emmanuel, prince of Naples. While Umberto was to be described by a modern historian as "a colourless and physically unimpressive man, of limited intellect", Margherita's appearance, cultural interests and strong personality were to enhance the popularity of the monarchy. Umberto kept many mistresses on the side, and his favourite mistress, Eugenia, the wife of Duke Litta Visconti-Arese, lived with him at his court as his common-law wife. He forced Queen Margherita to accept Eugenia as a lady-in-waiting.

In 1876, when the British Foreign Secretary, Lord Salisbury, visited Rome, he reported to London that King Victor Emmanuel II and Crown Prince Umberto were "at war with each other". Upon taking the Crown, Umberto dismissed all of his father's friends from the court, sold off his father's racing horse collection (which numbered 1,000 horses) and cut down on extravagances to pay down the debts Victor Emmanuel II had run up. The British historian Denis Mack Smith commented that it was a sign of the great wealth of the House of Savoy that Umberto was able to pay off his father's debts without having to ask parliament for assistance.

Like his father, Umberto was a poorly educated man without intellectual or artistic interests, never read any books, and preferred to dictate rather than write letters. He found writing to be too mentally taxing. He was said to have been raised with no real plan and was even uncomfortable when writing his signature in front of onlookers. After meeting him, Queen Victoria described Umberto as having his father's "gruff, abrupt manner of speaking", but without his "rough speech and manners". In contrast, Queen Margherita was widely read in all the classics of European literature, and kept up a salon of intellectuals. Although French was her first language, Margherita was often praised for her beautiful Italian in her letters and when speaking.

== Reign ==
=== Accession to the throne and first assassination attempt ===
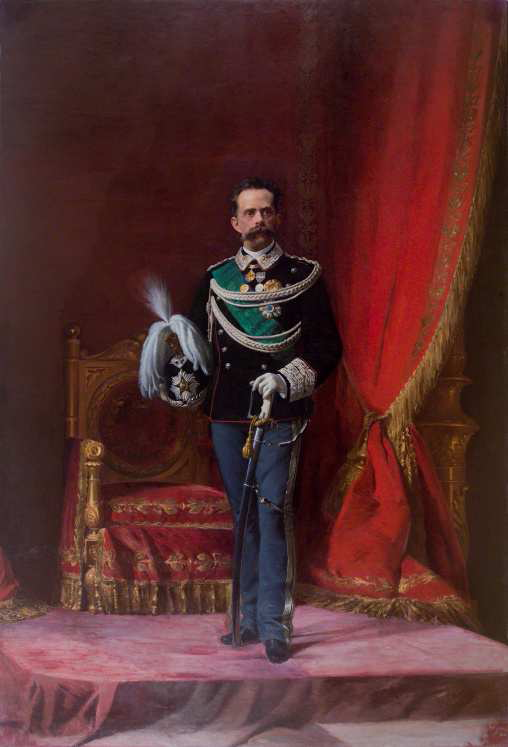
Umberto I in 1878

Ascending the throne on the death of his father (9 January 1878), Umberto adopted the title "Umberto I of Italy" rather than "Umberto IV" (of Savoy), ignoring his three ancestral namesakes, Umberto I, Umberto II, and Umberto III. He consented that the remains of his father should be interred at Rome in the Pantheon, rather than the royal mausoleum of the Basilica of Superga. While on a tour of the kingdom, accompanied by Queen Margherita and the Prime Minister Benedetto Cairoli, he was attacked with a dagger by an anarchist, Giovanni Passannante, during a parade in Naples on 17 November 1878. The King warded off the blow with his sabre, but Cairoli, in attempting to defend him, was severely wounded in the thigh. The would-be assassin was condemned to death. The King commuted the sentence to one of penal servitude for life, which was served in a cell only 1.4 meters (4 ft 7 in) high, without sanitation and with 18 kilograms (40 lb) of chains. Passannante would die three decades later in a psychiatric institution.

=== Foreign policy ===
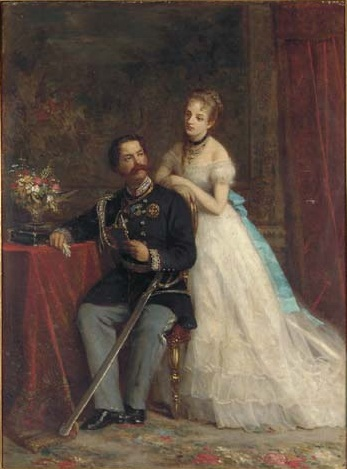
King Umberto I and Margherita during their stay in Naples

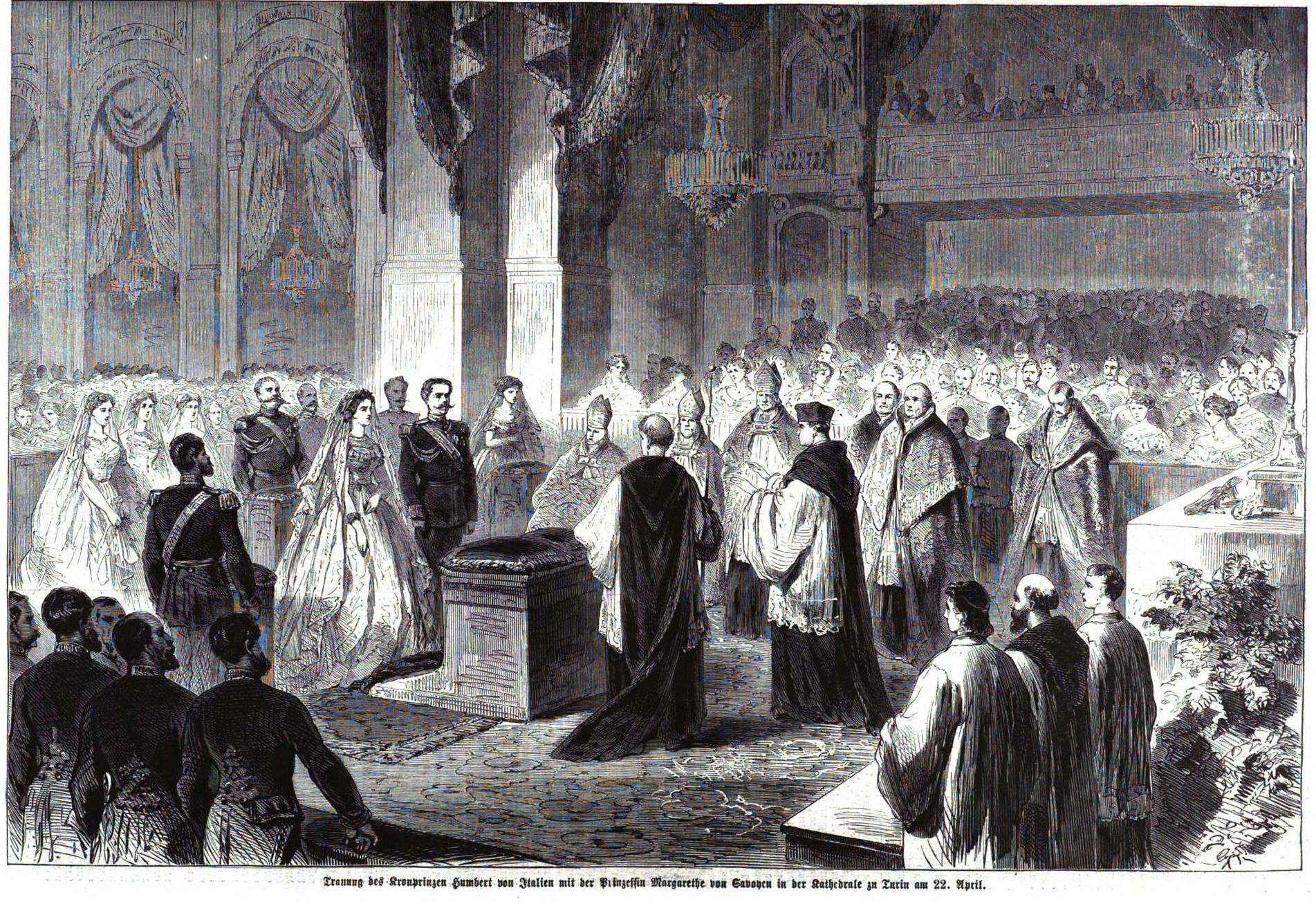
The royal wedding of Prince Umberto with Margherita of Savoy

In foreign policy, Umberto I approved the Triple Alliance with Austria-Hungary and the German Empire, repeatedly visiting Vienna and Berlin. Many in Italy, however, viewed with hostility an alliance with their former Austrian enemies, who were still occupying areas claimed by Italy. The Alliance was later renewed with the addition of commercial treaties. A strong militarist, Umberto loved Prussian-German militarism. On his visits to Germany, his favourite activity was to review the Prussian Army and he was greatly honoured to be allowed to lead a Prussian hussar regiment on field manoeuvres outside of Frankfurt. Emperor Wilhelm II of Germany told him during one visit that he should strengthen the Regio Esercito to the point that he could abolish parliament and rule Italy as a dictator.

A major criticism of the policies carried out by the Prime Ministers appointed by Umberto was the continued power of organized crime in the Mezzogiorno (Southern Italy), with the Mafia dominating Sicily and the Camorra dominating Campania. Both the Mafia and the Camorra functioned as "parallel states" whose existence and power was tolerated by successive governments in Rome as both the Mafia and the Camorra engaged in electoral fraud and voter intimidation so effective that it was Mafia and Camorra bosses who decided who won elections. As it was impossible to win elections in the Mezzogiorno without the support of organized crime, politicians cut deals with the bosses of the Camorra and Mafia to exchange toleration of their criminal activities for votes. The Mezzogiorno was the most backward region of Italy with high levels of poverty, emigration and an illiteracy rate estimated as high as 70%. The deputies from the Mezzogiorno always voted against more schools for the Mezzogiorno, thus perpetuating southern nescience and privation as both the Mafia and the Camorra were opposed to any sort of social reform that might threaten their power. However, the king preferred heavy military spending rather than engaging in social reforms and every year, the Italian state spent 10 times more money on the military than on education. Umberto, an aggressive proponent of militarism, once said that to accept cuts in the military budget would be "an abject scandal and we might as well give up politics altogether". At least part of the reason why Umberto was so opposed to cutting the military budget was because he personally promised Emperor Wilhelm II that Italy would send five army corps to Germany in the event of a war with France, a promise that the king did not see fit to share with his prime ministers.

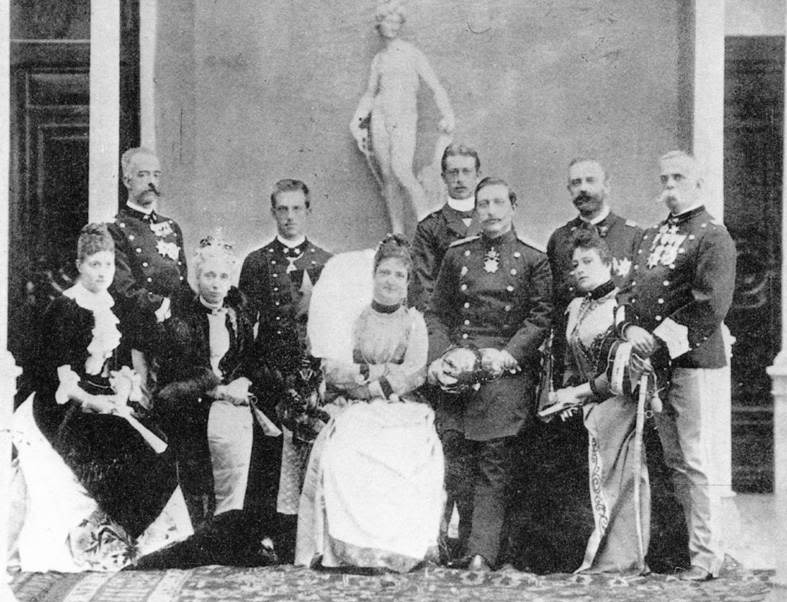
The Italian Royal Family during a royal state visit of Kaiser Wilhelm II at Rome, from left to right, Isabella of Bavaria, Duchess of Genoa, Prince Amadeo, Duke of Aosta, Princess Elisabeth of Saxony, Victor Emmanuel, Prince of Piedmont, Queen Margherita, Prince Henry of Prussia, Wilhelm II, Prince Tommaso, Duke of Genoa, Maria Letizia Bonaparte, Duchess of Aosta, and Umberto I, October 1888

Umberto was also favourably disposed towards the policy of colonial expansion inaugurated in 1885 by the occupation of Massawa in Eritrea. Italy expanded into Somalia in the 1880s as well. Umberto's preferred solution to the problems of Italy was to conquer Ethiopia, regardless of overwhelming public opposition. He supported the ultra-imperialist Prime Minister Francesco Crispi who in May 1895 spoke of "the absolute impossibility of continuing to govern through Parliament." In December 1893, Umberto appointed Crispi prime minister despite his "shattered reputation" due to his involvement in the Banca Romana scandal together with numerous other scandals that the king himself called "sordid". As Crispi was heavily in debt, the king secretly agreed to pay off his debts in exchange for Crispi following the king's advice.

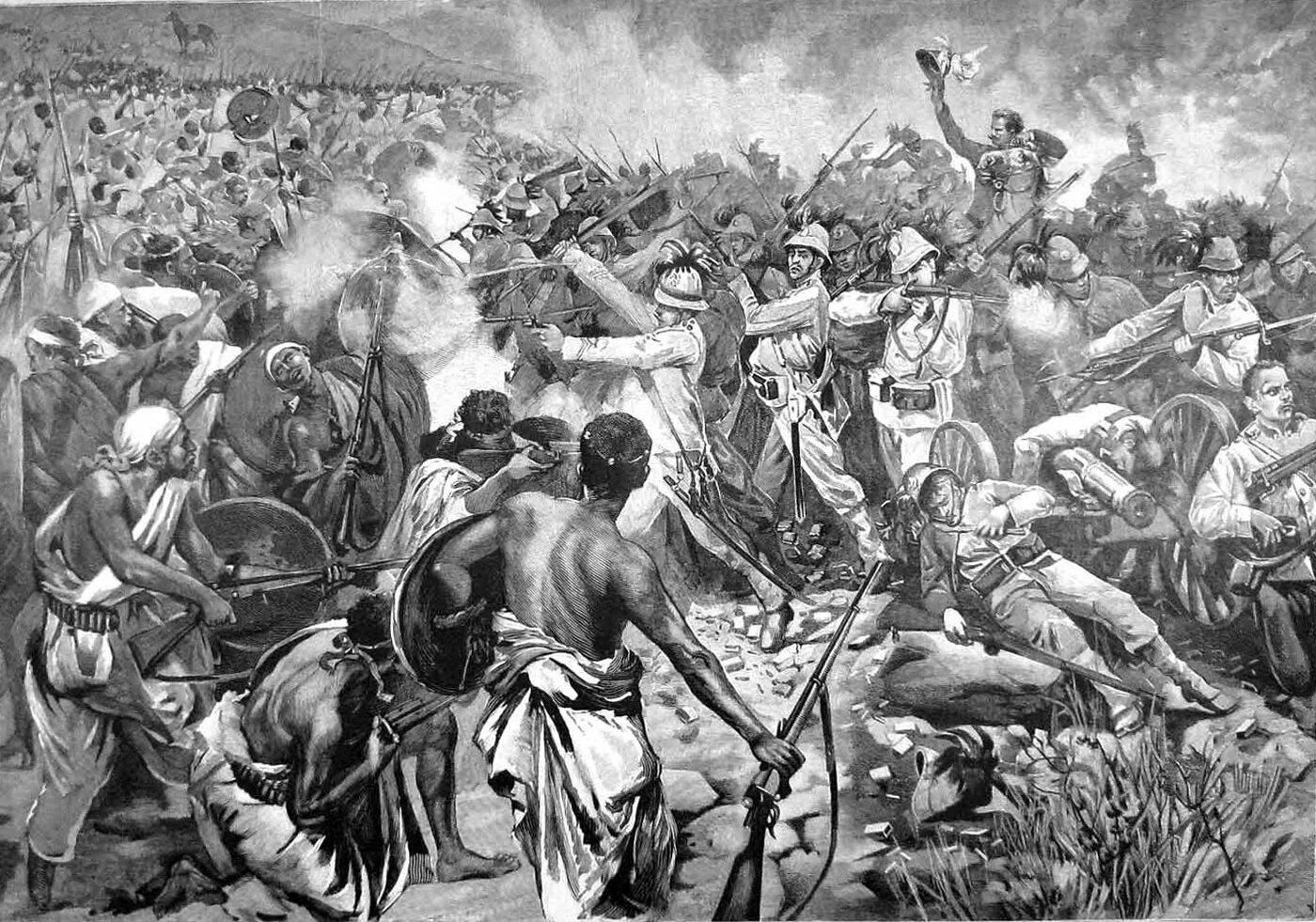
Menelik II's victory over the Italians at the Battle of Adwa

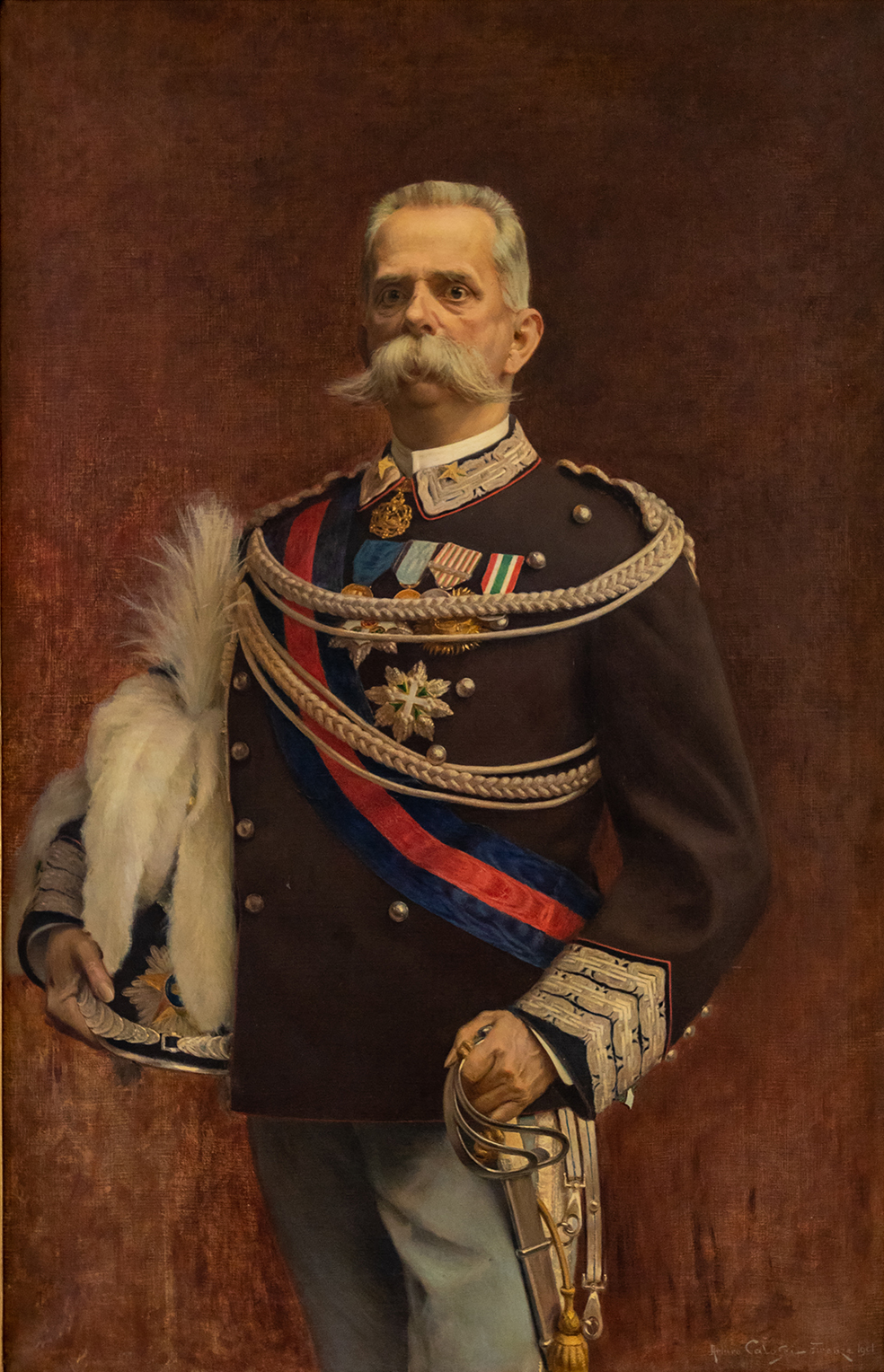
Umberto I in his later years, c. 1900

Umberto openly called Parliament a "bad joke" and refused to allow Parliament to meet again lest Crispi faced difficult questions about the Banca Romana scandal. Crispi only avoided indictment because of his parliamentary immunity. When the king was warned that it was dangerous for the crown to support someone like Crispi, Umberto replied that "Crispi is a pig, but a necessary pig", who despite his corruption, had to stay in power for "the national interest, which is the only thing that matters". With the support of the king, Crispi governed in an authoritarian manner, preferring to pass legislation by having the king issue royal decrees as opposed to getting bills passed by Parliament. On 25 June 1895 Crispi refused to allow a parliamentary inquiry into the bank scandal, saying that as a prime minister, he was above the law because he had "served Italy for 53 years". Umberto I was suspected of aspiring to a vast empire in northeast Africa, a suspicion which tended somewhat to diminish his popularity after the disastrous Battle of Adwa in Ethiopia on 1 March 1896. After the Battle of Adwa, public frustration with the deeply unpopular war with Ethiopia came to the fore, and demonstrations broke out in Rome with people shouting "death to the king!" and "long live the republic!".

Despite the defeat at Adwa, Umberto still harboured imperialistic ambitions towards Ethiopia, saying: "I am what they call a warmonger and my personal wish would be to strike back at Menelik and avenge our defeat." In 1897, the prime minister, Antonio Starabba, Marchese di Rudinì tried to sell Eritrea to Belgium on the grounds that Eritrea was too expensive to hold onto, but was overruled by the king who insisted that Eritrea must stay Italian. Rudinì attempted to reduce military spending, citing a study showing that since 1861 military spending constituted over half the budget every year, but was again blocked by the king. In 1899, Foreign Minister Felice Napoleone Canevaro dispatched a Regia Marina squadron to China with an ultimatum demanding that the Chinese government hand over a coastal city to be ruled as an Italian concession in the same manner as other Western imperial powers in China. Prime Minister Luigi Pelloux and his fellow cabinet ministers stated that Canevaro had acted without informing them, and it was widely believed that the king was the one who had given Canevaro the orders to acquire a concession in China. After the Chinese government refused, Canevaro threatened war, but was forced to back down. He settled for breaking diplomatic relations with China.

In the summer of 1900, Italian forces were part of the Eight-Nation Alliance which participated in suppressing the Boxer Rebellion in China. Through the Boxer Protocol, signed after Umberto's death, Italy gained a concession territory in Tientsin.

Umberto's attitude towards the Holy See was uncompromising. In an 1886 telegram, he declared Rome "untouchable" and affirmed the permanence of the Italian possession of the "Eternal City".

=== Turmoil ===
The reign of Umberto I ended with a period of social upheaval. Social tensions mounted due to the spread of socialist ideas, public hostility to the colonialist policies of the various governments, especially Crispi's, and the numerous crackdowns on civil liberties. The protesters included the young Benito Mussolini, then a member of the socialist party. On 22 April 1897, Umberto I was attacked again, by an unemployed ironsmith, Pietro Acciarito, who tried to stab him near Rome.

=== Bava Beccaris massacre ===
During the colonial wars in Africa, large demonstrations over the rising price of bread were held in Italy and on 7 May 1898, the city of Milan was put under military rule by General Fiorenzo Bava Beccaris, who ordered rifle-fire and artillery against the demonstrators. As a result, 82 people were killed according to the authorities, with opposition sources claiming that the death toll was 400 dead with 2,000 wounded. King Umberto sent a telegram to congratulate Bava Beccaris on the restoration of order and later decorated him with the medal of Great Official of Savoy Military Order, greatly outraging a large part of the public opinion.

== Assassination ==
On the evening of 29 July 1900, King Umberto I was shot dead by the Italian-American anarchist Gaetano Bresci while returning from a military parade in Monza. Bresci fired four shots that struck the king in the chest, neck and left thigh; he was arrested immediately after the attack. Umberto I was interred on 9 August 1900 at the Pantheon in Rome, next to his father Victor Emmanuel II. He was the last member of the House of Savoy to be buried there. His son and successor Victor Emmanuel III died in exile and was buried in Egypt until his remains were transferred to Vicoforte near Cuneo in 2017.

According to contemporary reports and later scholarship, Bresci’s motive was revenge for the victims of the Bava Beccaris massacre (the suppression of the May 1898 riots in Milan), which had led to the death of many working class citizens. Bresci had positioned himself along the road exiting the stadium to give himself a chance at escape; the excited crowd swept him within three meters of the king's car and blocked his way out. While amongst the crowd, Bresci drew his revolver and shot Umberto three or four times. As the king lay dying, the angry crowd wrestled Bresci to the ground and a Carabinieri marshal intervened before Bresci could be lynched. He accepted arrest without resistance, declaring: "I did not kill Umberto. I have killed the King. I killed a principle." On 22 May 1901, Bresci was found hanging by the neck in his cell. Vengeance had been carved into the wall. With his cell under constant surveillance, Bresci appeared to have hanged himself while one of his guards was asleep and the other was using the toilet.

Commenting about the 1969 book Killing No Murder by Edward Hyams, the Canadian critic George Fetherling in The Book of Assassins wrote that the description by Hymas of Umberto I "is so harsh that one is left to marvel that only three people tried to kill him".

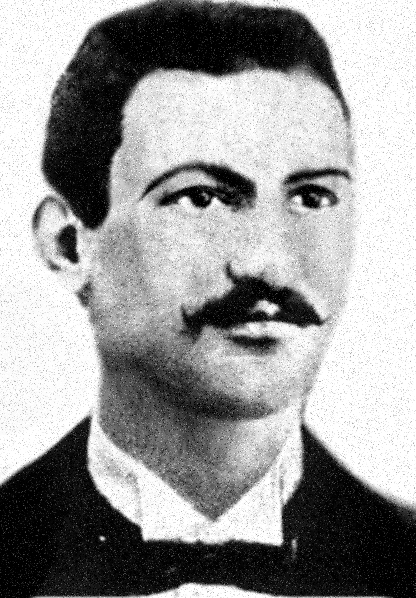
Gaetano Bresci, assassin of Umberto I

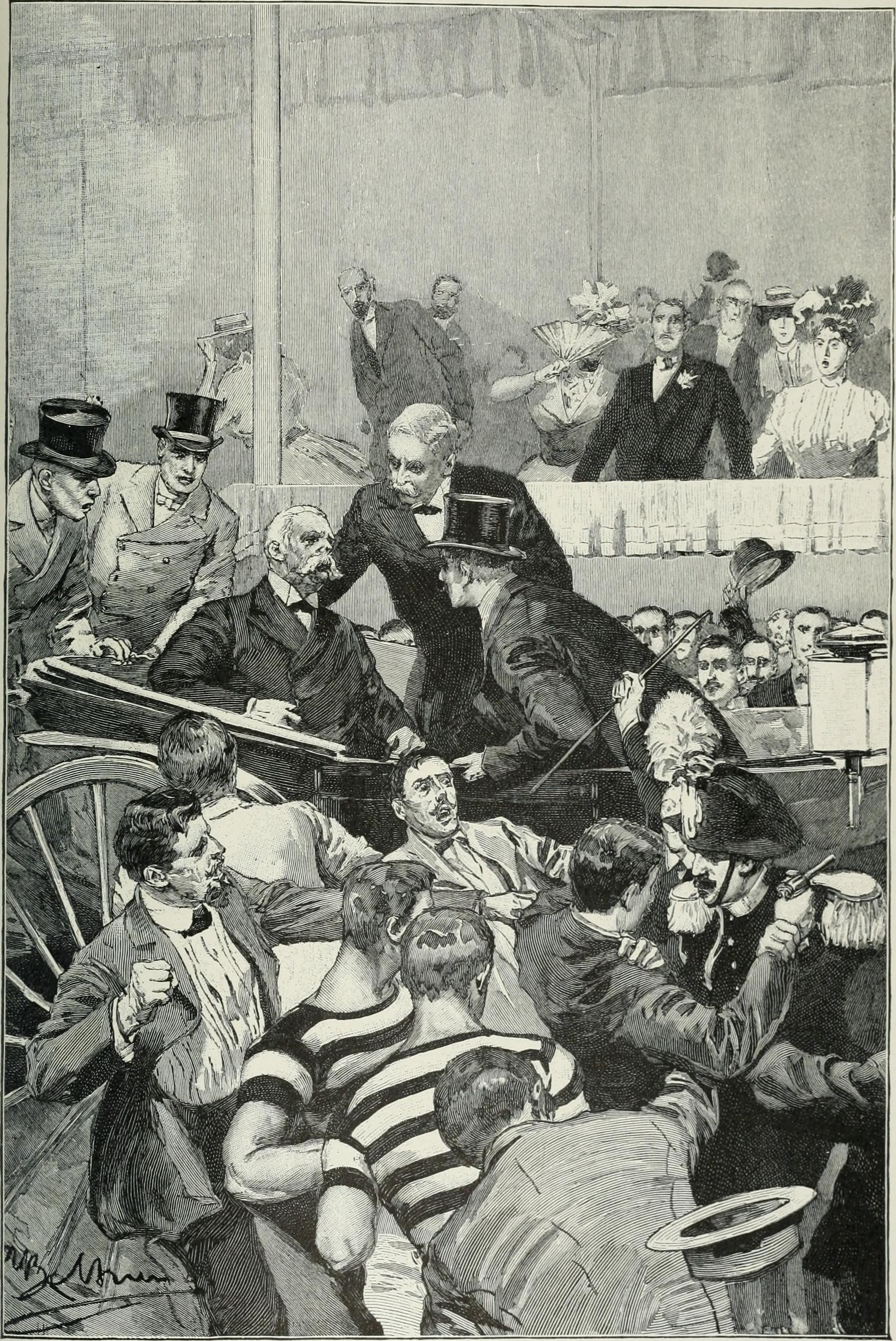
British illustration of the assassination

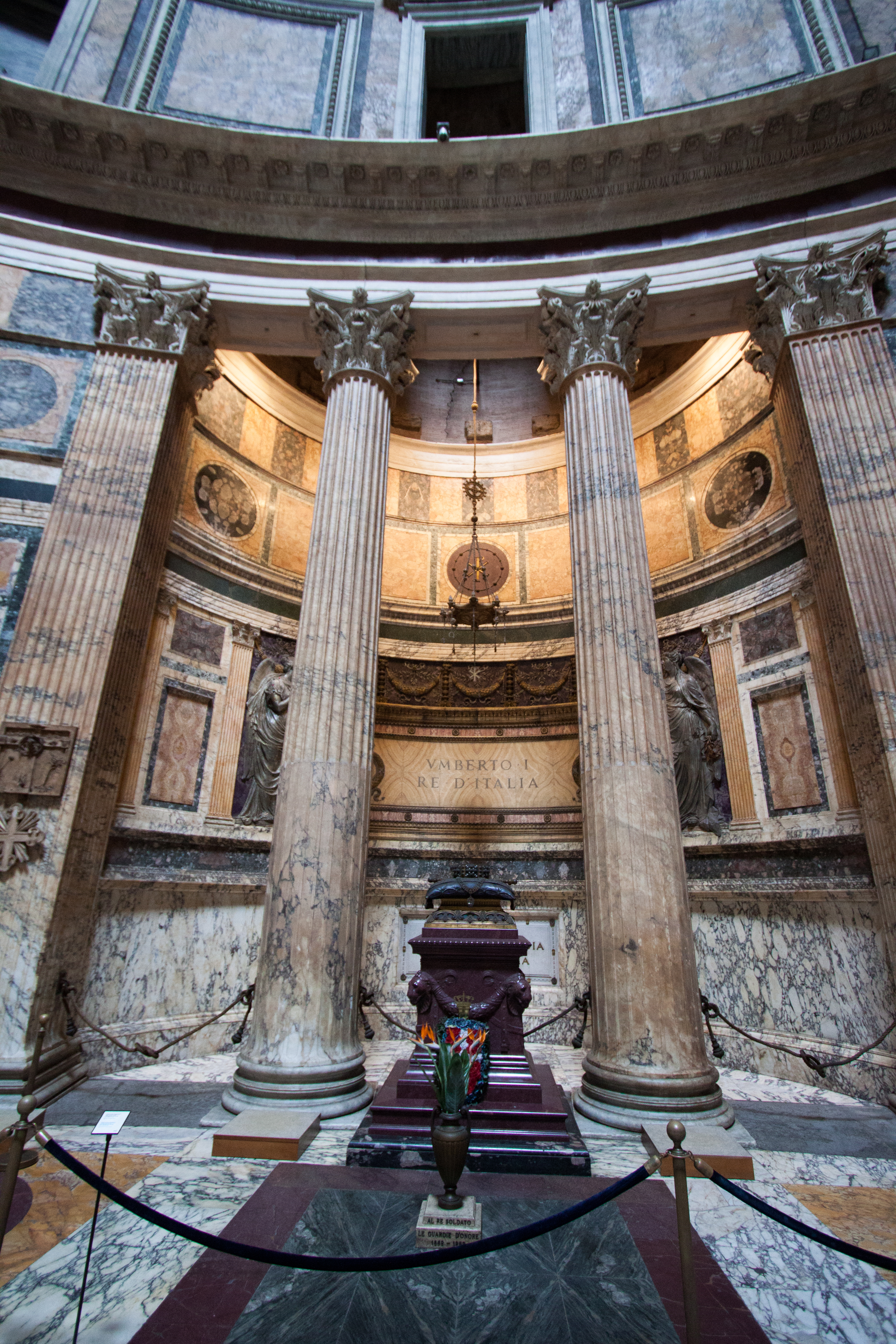
Tomb of Umberto I at the Pantheon

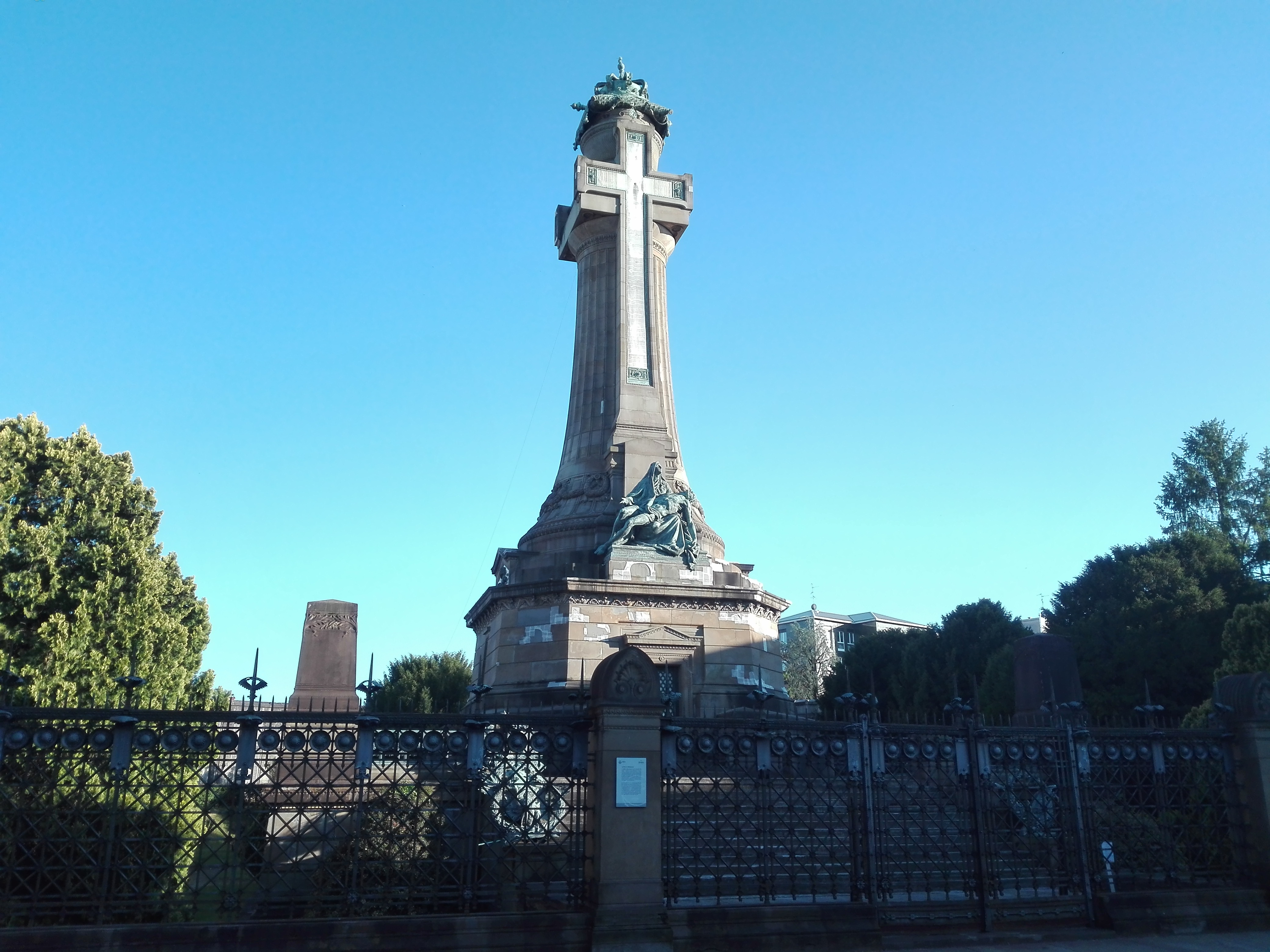
At the site of the attack in Monza, the Expiatory Chapel was built in memory of the murdered king

== Titles, styles, honours, and arms ==
=== Italian ===
- Knight of the Annunciation, 30 January 1859; Grand Master, 9 January 1878
- Grand Cross of Saints Maurice and Lazarus, 30 January 1859; Grand Master, 9 January 1878
- Gold Medal of Military Valour, 1866
- Grand Master of the Military Order of Savoy
- Grand Master of the Order of the Crown of Italy
- Grand Master of the Civil Order of Savoy
- Commemorative Medal of Campaigns of Independence Wars
- Commemorative Medal of the Unity of Italy

=== Foreign ===
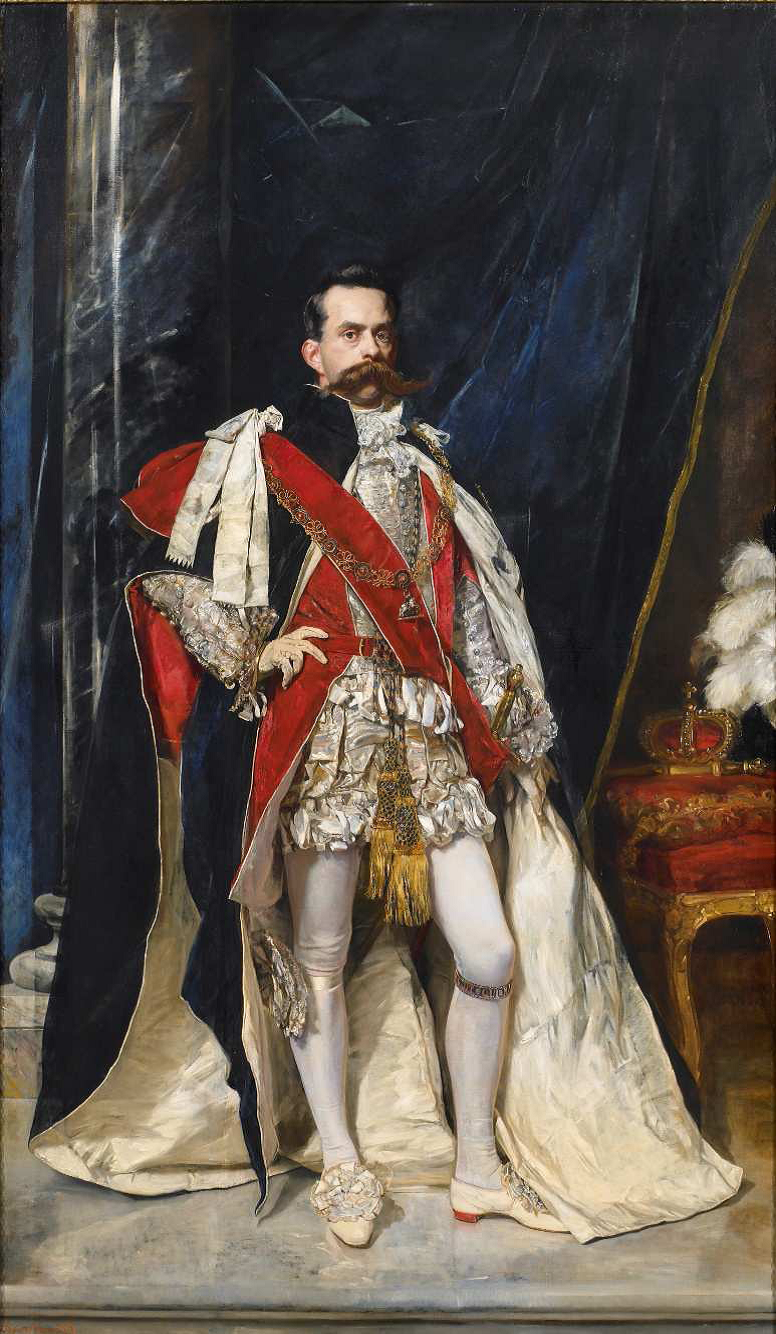
Wearing the robes of the Order of the Garter

- (Austrian Empire) (Kingdom of Hungary) Austria-Hungary:
  - Knight of the Golden Fleece, 1869
  - Grand Cross of the Royal Hungarian Order of St. Stephen, 1875
- Baden:
  - Knight of the House Order of Fidelity, 1864
  - Grand Cross of the Zähringer Lion, November 1865
- Kingdom of Bavaria: Knight of St. Hubert, 1869
- Belgium: Grand Cordon of the Order of Leopold (military), 17 May 1868
- Denmark: Knight of the Elephant, 19 August 1863
- (Saxe-Coburg and Gotha) (Duchy of Saxe-Altenburg) (Saxe-Meiningen) Ernestine duchies: Grand Cross of the Saxe-Ernestine House Order, 1869
- French Empire: Grand Cross of the Legion of Honour, January 1859
- Kingdom of Hawaii: Grand Cross of the Order of Kamehameha I, 1878
- Empire of Japan: Grand Cordon of the Order of the Chrysanthemum, 7 May 1880
- Mexican Empire: Grand Cross of the Mexican Eagle, October 1866
- Ottoman Empire: Order of the Medjidie, 1st Class, August 1862
- Beylik of Tunis: Grand Cordon of the Order of Glory, November 1862
- Kingdom of Portugal:
  - Grand Cross of the Sash of the Three Orders, September 1862
  - Grand Cross of the Tower and Sword, September 1862
- Kingdom of Prussia:
  - Pour le Mérite (military), 29 May 1872
  - Knight of the Black Eagle, with Collar, 29 March 1897
  - Grand Cross of the Red Eagle, 29 March 1897
- Russian Empire:
  - Knight of St. Andrew
  - Knight of St. Alexander Nevsky
- Saxe-Weimar-Eisenach: Grand Cross of the White Falcon, 1885
- Kingdom of Saxony: Knight of the Rue Crown, 1872
- (Thailand) Siam: Knight of the Order of the Royal House of Chakri, 15 July 1891
- Spain:
  - Grand Cross of the Order of Charles III, 22 August 1871
  - Grand Cross of the Military Order of St. Ferdinand
- Sweden-Norway: Knight of the Seraphim, with Collar, 14 March 1862
- United Kingdom: Stranger Knight Companion of the Garter, 16 March 1878
- Württemberg: Grand Cross of the Württemberg Crown, 1878

=== Coats of arms ===
Royal Standard of the King of Italy

Monogram

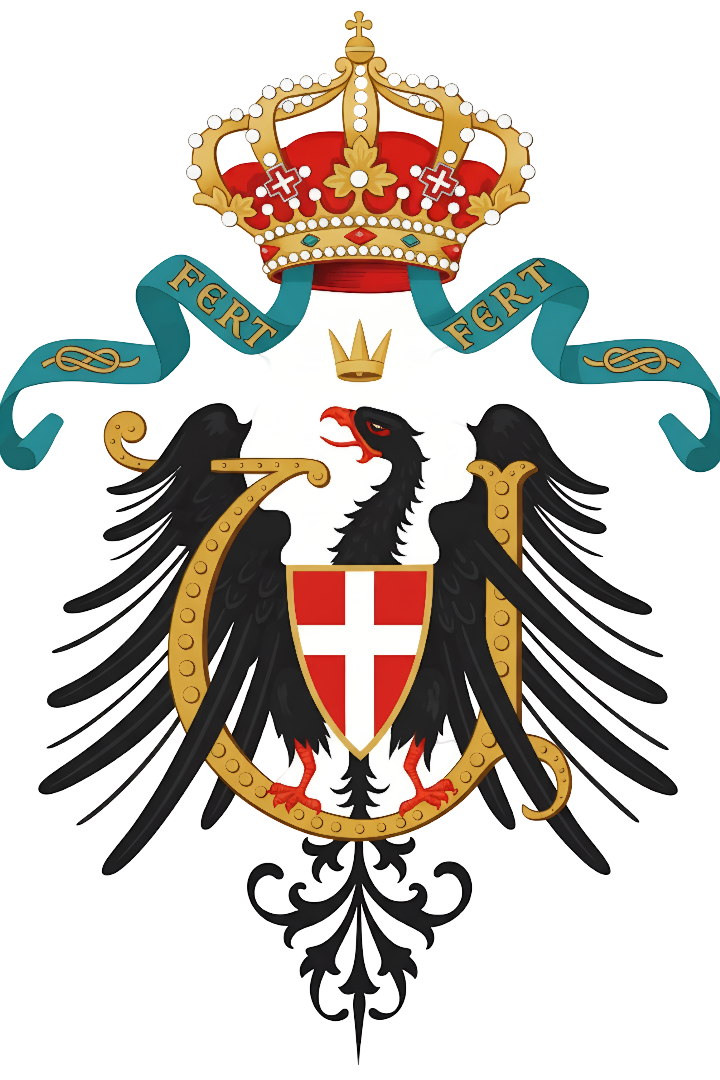
Variant with the Savoy eagle

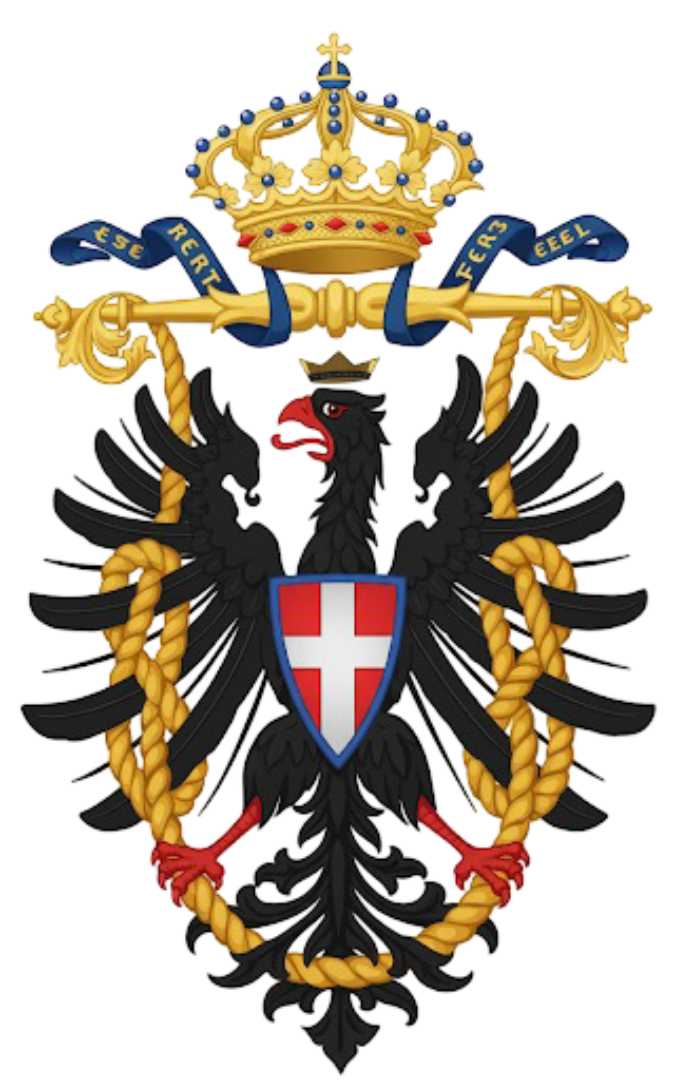
Variant with corded border

Combined monogram with the initials of King Umberto and Queen Margherita

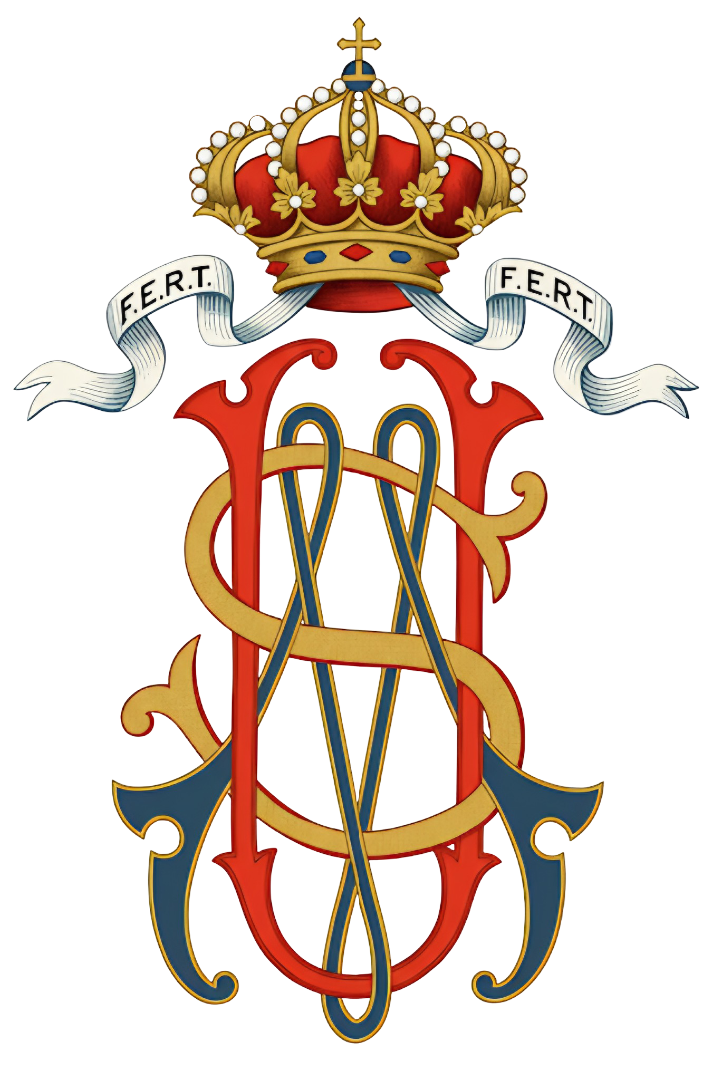
Variant of the combined monogram

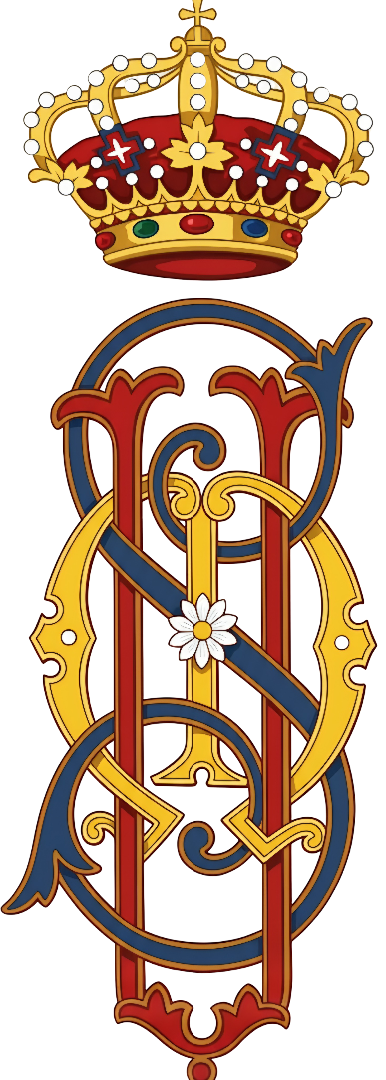
Variant of the combined monogram

Coat of arms as King of Italy
(1878–1890)

Lesser coat of arms as King of Italy
(1878–1890)

Greater coat of arms of the King of Italy
(1890–1900)

Middle coat of arms of the King of Italy
(1890–1900)

Middle coat of arms as King of Italy – variant
(1890–1900)

Lesser coat of arms as King of Italy
(1890–1900)

Umberto I of Italy House of Savoy Born: 14 March 1844 Died: 29 July 1900
Regnal titles
Preceded by Victor Emmanuel II	King of Italy; 1878–1900	Succeeded by Victor Emmanuel III
