= Radical Gotham =

2017 history book

- First edition
- Editor: Tom Goyens
- Subject: History of anarchism
- Publisher: University of Illinois Press
- Publication date: July 2017
- Pages: 270
- ISBN: 978-0-252-04105-1

Radical Gotham: Anarchism in New York City from Schwab's Saloon to Occupy Wall Street is a 2017 history book edited by Tom Goyens and published by the University of Illinois Press.
