= 1894 in Italy =

- Decades: 1870s; 1880s; 1890s; 1900s; 1910s
- See also: History of Italy; Timeline of Italian history; List of years in Italy

Events from the year 1894 in Italy.

== Kingdom of Italy ==
- Monarch – Umberto I (1878–1900)
- Prime Minister – Francesco Crispi (1893–1896)

== Events ==
=== January ===
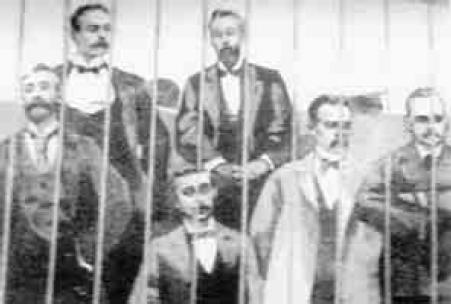
The heads of the Fasci Siciliani in the courtroom cage at the trial in April 1894

- January 3 – Prime Minister Francesco Crispi declares a state of siege throughout Sicily to quell the revolt of the Fasci Siciliani. General Roberto Morra di Lavriano is dispatched with 40,000 troops. A solidarity revolt of anarchists and republicans in the Lunigiana was crushed as well. The old order is restored through the use of extreme force, including summary executions. The Fasci are outlawed, the army and the police kill scores of protesters, and hundreds wounded.
- January 18 – The Banca Generale goes bankrupt.
- January 23 – The Bank of Italy suspends advances throughout Italy as its circulation has exceeded the legal limits.

=== February ===
- February 28 – Prime Minister Crispi reveals the "evidence" for a widespread conspiracy in parliament: the so-called "International Treaty of Bisacquino", signed by the French Government, the Czar of Russia, Giuseppe De Felice Giuffrida, the anarchists and the Vatican, with the goal to detach Sicily from the rest of the country and put it under a Franco-Russian protectorate. The Radical deputy Felice Cavallotti ridicules the conspiracy of Crispi.

=== April ===
- April 29 – Opening of the Roma San Pietro railway station (Italian: Stazione di Roma San Pietro) in Rome.

=== May ===
- May 2 – The Banca Romana scandal trial against the directors of the Banca Romana for embezzlement and other fraudulent practices begins.
- May 17 – Testimony at the Banca Romana scandal trial reveals that former Prime Minister Giovanni Giolitti had been aware of the financial disorder at the Banca Romana in 1889 already, but had held back that information. Gioltti also allegedly received money from the bank for election purposes.
- May 19 – The Banca Romana scandal trial is adjourned due to a fierce fist-fight between former Minister Luigi Miceli and a Bank Inspector, who testified against Miceli.
- May 30 – The leaders of the Fasci Siciliani are sentenced in Palermo: Giuseppe de Felice Giuffrida to 18 years and Rosario Garibaldi Bosco, Nicola Barbato and Bernardino Verro to 12 years in jail.

=== June ===
The failed attempt to kill Crispi by the anarchist Paolo Lega on June 16, 1894

- June 5 – Prime Minister Crispi resigns, but is ordered to reorganise his Cabinet.
- June 16 – Failed attempt to kill Prime Minister Francesco Crispi by the anarchist Paolo Lega. In this climate of increased the fear of anarchism, Crispi was able to introduce a series of anti-anarchist laws in July 1894, which were also used against socialists. Heavy penalties were announced for “incitement to class hatred” and police received extended powers of preventive arrest and deportation.

=== July ===
- July 17 – Battle of Kassala between Italian troops and Mahdist Sudanese forces. The Italians are victorious, and capture the town of Kassala.
- July 19 – A package of anti-anarchist laws and public safety measures is enacted.
- July 28 – The former governor Bernardo Tanlongo of the Banca Romana, the main defendant in the Banca Romana scandal and several of his subordinates are acquitted by the Court.

=== October ===
- October 10 – Foundation of the Banca Commerciale Italiana (BCI) as the successor of the Credito Mobiliare that collapsed during the Italian banking crisis of 1893–1894. The bank specializes in loans to industry, especially to companies in shipping, textiles, and electricity in Northern Italy.
- October 22 – The Socialist Party is dissolved by Crispi applying the law of July against subversive associations.

=== November ===
- November 8 – The Touring Club Ciclistico Italiano (TCCI) is founded in Milan by a group of bicyclists to promote the values of cycling and travel; its founding president is Luigi Vittorio Bertarelli.
- November 16 – An earthquake hits Calabria and the towns Reggio Calabria and Messina in Sicily.

=== December ===
- December 10 – An agreement between the Government and the Bank of Italy about the liquidation of the Banca Romana is approved. The Bank of Italy is entrusted with the treasury services throughout Italy. To balance the budget Finance Minister Sidney Sonnino announces increased taxes on alcohol, sugar and cotton, as well as an increased tariff on cereals.
- December 11 – Giolitti presents a series of documents that testify to the relations of Crispi with the Banca Romana scandal at the Chamber of Deputies, known as the "Giolitti envelope". A committee of five was appointed to examine the new evidence, including Felice Cavallotti, one of Crispi’s main allies.
- December 15 – The contents of documents submitted by Giolitti to the Chamber of Deputies are made public. Notes of the Banca Romana cashier implicate Prime Minister Crispi (with several drafts and a note for 1,050,000 lire), as well as the former president of the Chamber, Giuseppe Zanardelli, Giolitti's former Treasury Minister, Bernardino Grimaldi and other ex-Ministers. Some journalists received 200,000 lire and others 75,000 lire for press and election services. Letters from the former manager of the Banco Romana, Bernardo Tanlongo, explained that the deficit of the bank was due to disbursements to Ministers, Senators and members of the press.
- December 16 – In the Chamber of Deputies, Prime Minister Crispi denounces the Giolitti documents as a mass of lies. Deputy Matteo Imbriani wants the report be discussed at once. The motion was lost by a vote of 188 to 176. The Parliament is prorogated by decree amidst increasing protests, but rumours of the Cabinet's resignation are unfounded. Five battalions of infantry have been brought to Rome to quell eventual riots.

== Births ==
- January 6 – Ferdinando Garimberti, Italian violin maker (died 1982)
- January 20 – Alfredo Pizzoni, Italian banker and politician (died 1958)
- February 4 – Nunzio Malasomma, Italian film director and screenwriter (died 1974)
- March 24 – Elsa Respighi (née Olivieri-Sangiacomo), Italian composer (died 1996)
- April 14 - Leonarda Cianciulli, Italian serial killer and cannibal (died 1970)
- April 20 – Enrico Prampolini, Italian Futurist painter, sculptor and scenographer (died 1956)
- May 12 – Clemente Primieri, Italian general (died 1981)
- June 5 – Giuseppe Tucci, Italian scholar of oriental cultures, specialising in Tibet and history of Buddhism (died 1984)
- July 3 - Bianca Scacciati, Italian operatic soprano (died 1948)
- July 6 – Filippo Zappata, Italian engineer and aircraft designer (died 1994)
- July 8 – Carlo Ludovico Bragaglia, Italian film director
- August 1 – Ottavio Bottecchia, Italian cyclist and the first Italian winner of the Tour de France (died 1927)
- August 20 – Tecla Scarano, Italian film actress (died 1978)
- September 29 – Franco Capuana, Italian conductor
- October 30 – Emilio Materassi, Italian Grand Prix motor racing driver.

== Deaths ==
- February 2 – Marco Mortara, Italian rabbi and scholar (born 1815)
- February 18 – Camillo Sivori, Italian virtuoso violinist and composer (born 1815)
- April 13 – Baldassarre Boncompagni, Italian historian of mathematics (born 1821)
- April 29 – Giuseppe Battaglini, Italian mathematician (born 1826)
- May 2 – Pietro Abbà Cornaglia, Italian organist, concert pianist, and composer (born 1851)
- June 13 – Giovanni Nicotera, Italian patriot and politician (born 1828)
- June 23 – Marietta Alboni, Italian contralto opera singer (born 1826)
- August 5 – Giovanni Muzzioli, Italian painter (born 1854)
- August 16 – Sante Geronimo Caserio, Italian anarchist and the assassin of Marie François Sadi Carnot, President of the French Third Republic (born 1873)
- August 21 – Giacomo Durando, Italian general and statesman (born 1807)
- September 20 – Giovanni Battista de Rossi, Italian archaeologist, famous outside his field for his rediscovery of early Christian catacombs (born 1822).
- December 14 – Francesco Denza, Italian meteorologist and astronomer (born 1834)
- December 28 – Caterina Volpicelli, Italian nun, foundress of the Congregation “Ancelle del Sacro Cuore di Gesù” (Handmaids of the Sacred Heart of Jesus) (born 1839)
