= Giovanni Noè =

Italian politician

- Born: 29 April 1866; Messina, Italy
- Died: 28 December 1908 (aged 42); Messina, Italy
- Occupations: Lawyer, anarchist and politician

Giovanni Noè (29 April 1866 – 28 December 1908) was an Italian lawyer, anarchist and politician, involved in the Fasci Siciliani (Sicilian Leagues), a popular movement of democratic and socialist inspiration in 1891–1894. He was elected to the Italian Chamber of Deputies in 1900 and 1904.

== Biography ==
After completing his classical studies, Noè graduated in law in his home town Messina, where he initially frequented radical groups, from which he broke away to join the socialist-anarchist movement. In January 1886, together with Francesco Lo Sardo and other young people, he formed the Amilcare Cipriani association and founded the periodical Il Riscatto (The Redemption), which published its programme in its first issue.

The paper – which ran, with some interruptions, until 15 November 1897 – was suspended in June 1886, when the judicial authorities dissolved the association and prevented its members from carrying out political activities. It resumed publication on 7 June 1887 under the direction of Noè, who managed to involve leading socialists such as Francesco Saverio Merlino, Nicola Barbato, Filippo Turati and Giuseppe De Felice Giuffrida.

On March 18, 1889, together with Nicola Petrina, he formed the first Fascio dei Lavoratori (Workers League) in Messina but the organisation remained dormant after the arrest of Petrina in July of that year. The association was soon broken up by personal disagreements, which led to the birth of the newspaper Il Vespro and caused serious organisational divisions in the Messina socialist movement.

In January 1892, he founded a section of the Fascio ferroviario (Railway Workers League). The explosion of the Fasci Siciliani movement throughout Sicily the following years was considered by Noè as a new event in the organisation of workers: political circles and mutual aid societies were thus transformed into a section of the reconstituted Messina Fascio, of which Noè became vice-president in 1892.

Noè was among the 500 delegates from nearly 90 leagues and socialist circles at the Congress of the Fasci that was held in Palermo on May 21–22, 1893. The Congress decided that all Leagues were obliged to join the Party of Italian Workers (Partito dei Lavoratori Italiani, the initial name of the Italian Socialist Party).

In July 1893 he participated the municipal elections in Messina and sent a letter to the electorate justifying the abandonment of his intransigent abstentionism. Elected as a municipal councillor, he remained in office until his death in 1908 and distinguished himself both for his denunciation of the patronage system and for his fight in favour of the working classe.

Following the repression of the Fasci Siciliani by the government of Francesco Crispi in January 1894, he went into hiding, as he was wanted on charges of conspiracy against the state and incitement to civil war. Acquitted of the charges, he resumed political activity in May of the same year, managing to unite the workers' organisations in the Socialist Party. His action was also aimed at setting up the local Camera del Lavoro (Chamber of Labour), a kind of labour council, where working class organizations encouraged mutual aid, education, and self-organization amongst their members, which had a significant influence on his less intransigent and revolutionary attitude.

In the elections of 3 June 1900 he was elected in Italian Chamber of Deputies in the first round thanks to the support of the Camera del Lavoro and other democratic associations: his was the victory of the Messina socialists who managed to defeat Baron Ernesto Cianciolo, the representative of the landowning classes, linked to the city's wealthiest families. During his parliamentary mandate he was a member of the socialist group and represented the most intransigent wing against the Zanardelli-Giolitti cabinet (1901–03). As a member of parliament he was committed to organising new socialist sections in the Sicilian provinces, carrying out intense political activity. He was re-elected in 1904.

He died as a result of the earthquake and tsunami of December 28, 1908, when the city of Messina was almost entirely destroyed killing between 75,000 and 82,000 people.
