= Nicola Petrina =

Italian socialist politician (1861–1908)

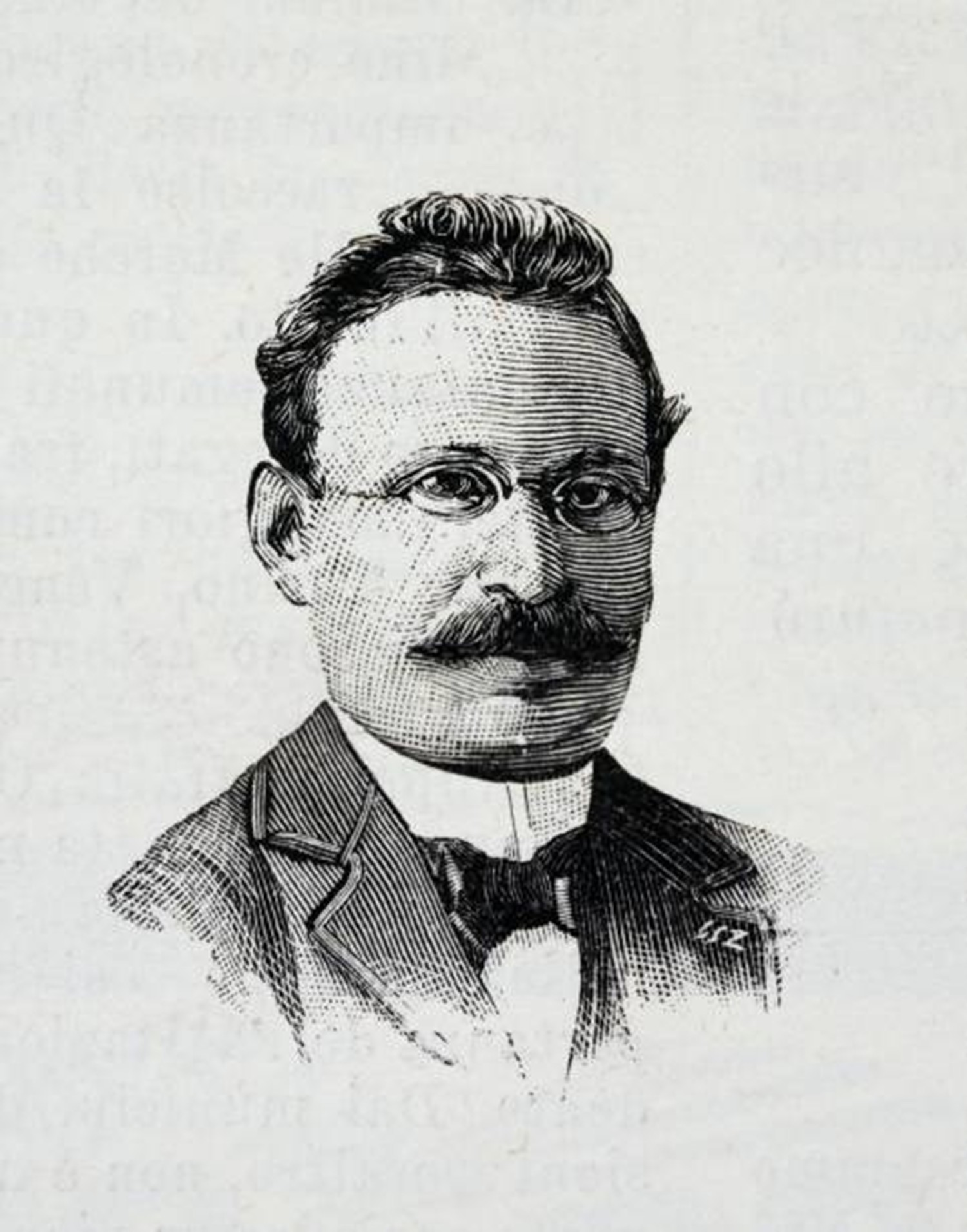
- Nicola Petrini in 1894
- Born: 13 November 1861; Randazzo, Italy
- Died: 28 December 1908 (aged 47); Messina, Italy
- Occupation: Socialist politician
- Known for: Prominent leader of the Fasci Siciliani

Nicola Petrina (13 November 1861 – 28 December 1908) was an Italian socialist and politician from Sicily. He was one of the national leaders of the Fasci Siciliani (Sicilian Leagues) a popular movement of democratic and socialist inspiration from 1891 to 1894.

== Life ==
Nicola was born on 13 November 1861 in Randazzo, Italy. Together with the anarchist Giovanni Noè, he set up the first Fascio dei Lavoratori in Messina on 18 March 1889, but the organisation remained dormant after the arrest of Petrina in July of that year. He was not released until 1892 when many more Fasci had been set up in Sicily. Another reason why the Fascio of Messina – formed after the example of the Fasci operai [Workers leagues] constituted in Central and North Italy from 1871 – initially did not develop was that it brought together not individual workers but the workers' associations of the city, which retained their independence, their status and economic orientation.

Petrina was among the 500 delegates from nearly 90 leagues and socialist circles at the Congress of the Fasci that was held in Palermo on 21–22 May 1893. A Central Committee was elected, composed of nine members: Petrina was elected for the province of Messina. The Congress decided that all Leagues were obliged to join the Party of Italian Workers (Partito dei Lavoratori Italiani, the initial name of the Italian Socialist Party).

In July 1893, he was elected in the municipal council of Messina, where he immediately discovered serious abuses that had been committed in the City Hall for years.

Following the repression of the Fasci Siciliani by the government of Francesco Crispi, he was arrested on 4 January 1894, and was brought to trial. On May 30, 1894, the leaders of the movement received their sentence: Giuseppe de Felice Giuffrida to 18 years and Rosario Garibaldi Bosco, Nicola Barbato and Bernardino Verro to 12 years in jail. Petrina was sentenced to three years, on trumped up charges and his contact with the anarchist Amilcare Cipriani.

He died during the earthquake and tsunami of 28 December 1908, when the city of Messina was almost entirely destroyed killing between 75,000 and 82,000 people. His body was found on 11 January 1909.
