= Caltavuturo massacre =

1893 massacre in Sicily, Italy

Coordinates: 37°49′23.4″N 13°53′18.8″E

- Part of Fasci Siciliani
- Popular depiction of the crackdown on the Fasci Siciliani mentioning the massacre in Caltavuturo
- Location: Caltavuturo in the Province of Palermo, Sicily
- Date: January 20, 1893
- Target: Landless peasants occupying communal land during the Fasci Siciliani.
- Attack type: Massacre
- Deaths: 13 killed: Giovanni Ariano (28), Giuseppe Bonanno (28), Pasquale Cirrito (17), Calogero Di Stefano (22), Liborio Frisa (38), Vincenzo Guarnieri (18), Mariano Guggino (45), Nicolò Iannè (60), Francesco Inglese (68), Giuseppe Modaro (34), Giuseppe Renna (30); 21 wounded
- Perpetrators: Royal Italian Army and Carabinieri
- Motive: Prevent the peasants to take hold of the land

The Caltavuturo massacre took place on January 20, 1893, in Caltavuturo in the Province of Palermo (Sicily), when during the celebration of Saint Sebastian, some 500 peasants returning from the symbolic occupation of 250 hectares of communal land were dispersed by soldiers and policemen, killing 13 and wounding 21 peasants. The claim for land reform was one of the demands of the Fasci Siciliani (Sicilian Leagues), a popular movement of democratic and socialist inspiration in 1891–1894.

== Background ==
The 250 hectares of communal land had been ceded to the municipality of Caltavuturo by the Duke of Fernardina, owner of more than 6,000 hectares of land (more than half of the entire municipality) after 1812 – the year that feudalism was abolished in Sicily. Before the abolition of feudalism, the villagers had the right to go on estates to collect firewood and vegetables, but that right expired in 1812 arousing the ire of the entire population. The dispute about access to the land lasted for years, until an agreement was reached under which the duke agreed to cede 250 hectares to the municipality in exchange for giving up the 'communal rights'.

The citizens of Caltavuturo who waited anxiously to get hold of a piece of land to feed their families, fell from the frying pan into the fire. While the municipality had to distribute the land among the villagers, town administrators and notables stalled the distribution, because they wanted to appropriate the land personally. In the fall of 1892, with the advent of the Fasci Siciliani, the peasants were convinced that the distribution of the land was imminent and set aside grain to be used as seed. However, past mid-January 1893, nothing had been done to divide the land, risking that it could not be sown in time that year.

On the evening of January 19 a crowded meeting discussed what to do next. Some pleaded for occupying the land while moderates argued for patience. After the meeting, the more radical elements went from house to house and convinced many to occupy the land early the next morning. Other leaders got wind of the manifestation and informed the army and police, while infiltrators were sent among the peasants.

== The massacre ==
Landless peasants occupied the communal land at dawn and began to hoe the fields. The commander of the military stationed in the county tried to persuade the peasants to leave the fields and go home. The crowd ignored the warning and began to whistle and yell at the troops. To prevent the situation from worsening, the military withdrew and returned to the town. Shortly thereafter, a group of protesters stopped tilling the soil and went to the town hall, demanding to speak with the mayor to no avail.

When they returned to join their companions in the fields they were stopped in the Via Vittorio Emanuele by soldiers, policemen and two municipal guards, with the intention of preventing the two groups meet. The commander once again tried to persuade the peasants to disperse and return to their homes, but some of the protesters threw stones at the troops, who fired two shots in the air. The warning shots did not intimidate the farmers, who continued to advance, throwing stones against the police. At this point, they heard more shots, followed by a salvo of rifle fire. Several protesters fell to the ground in a pool of blood. Eight people were killed on the spot and 26 were wounded; five later died in the days after the shooting. (Other sources mention 11 dead and others mortally wounded)

At first, people hearing the shots, thought it was firecrackers in honour of San Sebastian, but the tragic massacre soon became clear. The unharmed protesters fled to the mountains, but military reinforcements from Palermo triggered a real manhunt and arrested several peasants.

== Aftermath ==
The news of the massacre created a national scandal and mobilized the Fasci, led by the most prestigious leaders, such as Rosario Garibaldi Bosco, Bernardino Verro and Nicola Barbato, who organized financial contributions to help the families of victims. The socialist leader Napoleone Colajanni harshly attacked the government in parliamentary questions.

The memorial service was held in Corleone and attracted more than 4,000 people from the surrounding towns.

== In literature and film ==
- One of the leaders of the Fasci, Rosario Garibaldi Bosco, wrote a play about the event, Il giorno di San Sebastiano (Saint Sebastian Day). The play, a monologue depicting a peasant woman whose husband was killed in the events at Caltavuturo, was first performed on February 2, 1893, in Palermo to raise money for the victims.
- The film Il giorno di San Sebastiano (Saint Sebastian's Day) (1993), directed by Pasquale Scimeca 100 years after the event, is based on Bosco's play about the Caltavuturo massacre. It won a Golden Globe and was presented at the Venice film festival. (Watch the trailer)
