= Cianciolo =

Cianciolo is a surname of Italian origin, with the meaning of surrounding net. Notable people with this surname are:

- Ernesto Cianciolo (1856–1905), Italian politician, major of Messina
- Susan Cianciolo (born 1969), American fashion designer and artist.

== See also ==
- Ciancio
- Ciancia
