= Giacomo Montalto =

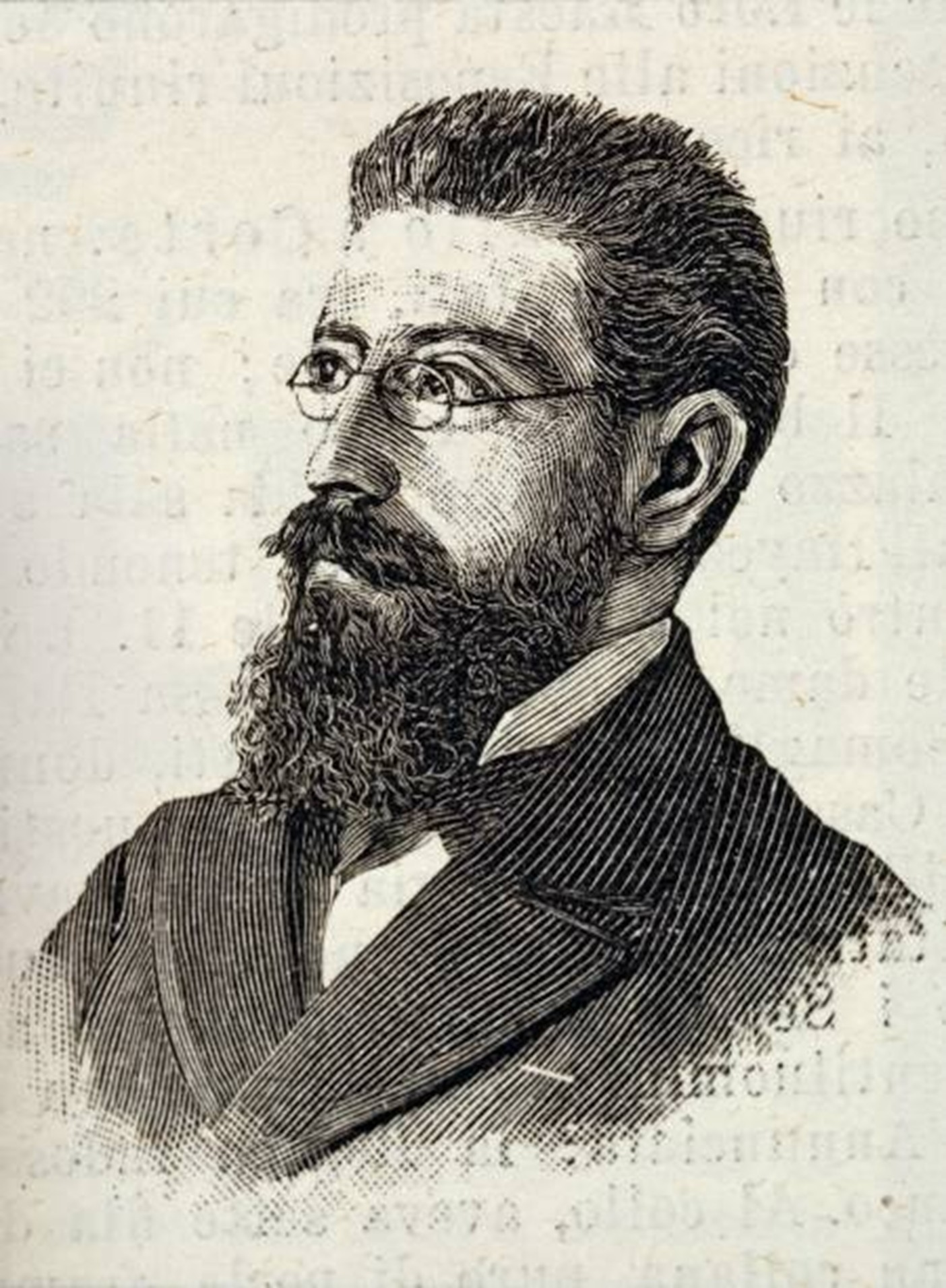
- Giacomo Montalto in 1894
- Born: 14 April 1864; Trapani, Italy
- Died: 24 October 1934 (aged 70); Trapani
- Occupation: Lawyer
- Known for: Prominent leader of the Fasci Siciliani

Giacomo Montalto (Trapani, April 4, 1864 - Trapani, October 24, 1934) was an Italian Republican-inspired socialist, politician and lawyer. He was one of the leaders of the Fasci Siciliani (Sicilian Leagues), a popular movement of democratic and socialist inspiration in 1891–1894.

== Early life ==
Born in Trapani, the son of the lawyer Francesco Montalto and Maria Sanfilippo, he obtained a law degree. As a young man he attended the radical circles of Trapani inspired by Giuseppe Mazzini and studied the social question in Sicily.

Between August and October 1890, he travelled to Germany where he came into contact with Marxist ideas, met some social-democrat leaders and was inspired to translate socialist texts into Italian, such as Thesen über den Sozialismus by Jakob Stern (de). He changed from his original Mazzinian position towards the radical and socialistic ideas represented in Sicily by Napoleone Colajanni, with whom he would maintain a lifelong friendship.

== Fasci Siciliani ==
He was among the founders of the Fasci dei lavoratori in Trapani (September 4, 1892) and became its president. He was part of the central committee of the Fasci Siciliani (1893–1894) for the province of Trapani and the regional direction of the newborn Italian Socialist Party (PSI). Montalto maintained a gradualist and evolutionary vision of political and social struggle, criticizing the revolutionary excesses of the Fasci and dissociating from the radical tendencies advocated by the newspaper Giustizia sociale of Rosario Garibaldi Bosco in Palermo, that broke with Colajanni.

Following the repression of the Fasci by the government of Francesco Crispi, he was arrested in January 1894 and was brought to trial. Despite his opposition to the revolt and violent protest, he was sentenced to ten years in prison and two years of special surveillance by the military court in Palermo on May 30, 1894. He was released on September 22, 1895, thanks to a pardon.

== Promoting cooperations ==
After his release he continued with his reformist line focusing on the educational function of solidarity and cooperation, apparent in his writing La questione sociale e il partito socialista (The social question and the Socialist Party), published in Milan in 1899. In 1899, he was elected in the municipal council of Trapani.

Due to a wave of national strikes and peasant demands in September 1901, made possible by the more liberal political climate established by the Zanardelli-Giolitti government, the socialist movement in the province of Trapani under Montalto and Sebastiano Cammareri Scurti, developed a network of socialist sections in small towns, that managed to obtain the first successes in the struggle for agrarian reform and the revision of rents. They promoted the birth and success of agricultural cooperatives interested in getting collective leaseholds from large landholders.

== Final years ==
Montalto remained committed to the cooperative movement. In 1912, he left the Italian Socialist Party (PSI) and joined the Italian Reformist Socialist Party of Ivanoe Bonomi and Leonida Bissolati supporting the Italian invasion of Libya. He also supported Italy's participation in World War I on the side of the Triple Entente.

After World War I, he encountered enormous difficulties in achieving acceptance of his application for readmission to the PSI, and withdrew from active politics, devoting himself to the legal profession. He died in Trapani on October 24, 1934.
