= Cammarata (surname) =

Cammarata is a surname. Notable people with this surname include:

- Bernard Cammarata, who founded American retail corporation TJX Companies
- Diego Cammarata (born 1951), an Italian politician
- Fabrizio Cammarata (born 1975), an Italian football manager
- Joseph Cammarata (born 1958), an American attorney
- Maria Cammarata (fl. 1893), an Italian leader of the Fasci Siciliani movement
