= Scimeca =

Scimeca is a surname. Notable people with the surname include:

- Alexa Scimeca Knierim, (born 1991), née Alexa Scimeca, American pair skater
- Pasquale Scimeca (born 1956), Italian film director and producer
- Riccardo Scimeca (born 1975), English footballer and coach
