= Il giorno di San Sebastiano =

- Directed by: Pasquale Scimeca
- Written by: Pasquale Scimeca
- Produced by: Gherardo Pagliei & Elisabetta Riga
- Starring: Silvana Prinzivalli, Franco Scaldati and Vincenzo Albanese
- Cinematography: Giuseppe Schifani
- Music by: Franco Battiato
- Distributed by: Arbash & Gam Films
- Release date: 1993
- Running time: 77 minutes
- Country: Italy
- Language: Italian

Il giorno di San Sebastiano (English: Saint Sebastian Day) is an Italian film written and directed by Pasquale Scimeca. The film is based on true historical events, the Caltavuturo massacre that took place on January 20, 1893, in Caltavuturo in the Province of Palermo (Sicily), during the celebration of Saint Sebastian.

On that day some 500 peasants returning from the symbolic occupation of 250 hectares of communal land were dispersed by soldiers and policemen, killing 13 and wounding 21 peasants. The claim for land reform was one of the demands of the Fasci Siciliani (Sicilian Leagues), a popular movement of democratic and socialist inspiration in 1891–1894. The film was released 100 years after the event. It is based on a play by Rosario Garibaldi Bosco, one of the leaders of the Fasci Siciliani. The play, a monologue depicting a peasant woman whose husband was killed in the events at Caltavuturo, was first performed on February 2, 1893, in Palermo to raise money for the victims.

The film won a Globo d'oro for Best First Feature (1994) in Italy and was presented at the Venice film festival in the section Showcase of Italian cinema.

== See also ==
- List of Italian films of 1993
