= Fasci Siciliani =

Popular movement in Sicily

Fasci Siciliani dei Lavoratori
- Popular depiction of the crackdown on the Fasci Siciliani (Il movimento dei fasci siciliani dei lavoratori, 1955, by Onofrio and Minico Ducato)
- Date: 1891–1894
- Location: Sicily
- Type: Mass strikes, land occupations and ransacking local tax offices.
- Cause: Economic crisis and a deep recession since the end of the 1880s in which the dominant landowning class shifted much of the economic burden onto the peasantry by imposing higher rents and discriminatory local taxes, pushing many into even more extreme poverty and starvation.
- Target: Fair land rents with new sharecropping contracts that would deliver more grain to the peasant, higher wages, an end to common contractual abuses and usury, and lower local taxes and distribution of misappropriated common land.
- Participants: Popular movement of democratic and socialist inspiration; 177 Fasci with membership exceeding 200,000
- Outcome: Government imposed a state of emergency and reasserted control through extreme measures, including summary executions. The Fasci were banned, and many demonstrators were killed or injured. Thousands of activists — including all leaders — were imprisoned or internally exiled. All working-class organizations and cooperatives were disbanded, and freedoms of the press, assembly, and association were suspended.

The Fasci Siciliani (Italian: [ˈfaʃʃi sitʃiˈljaːni]), short for Fasci Siciliani dei Lavoratori ('Sicilian Workers Leagues'), were a popular movement of democratic and socialist inspiration that arose in Sicily in the years between 1889 and 1894. The Fasci gained the support of the poorest and most exploited classes of the island by channeling their frustration and discontent into a coherent programme based on the establishment of new rights. Consisting of a jumble of traditionalist sentiment, religiosity, and socialist consciousness, the movement reached its apex in the summer of 1893, when new conditions were presented to the landowners and mine owners of Sicily concerning the renewal of sharecropping and rental contracts.

Upon the rejection of these conditions, there was an outburst of strikes that rapidly spread throughout the island, and was marked by violent social conflict, almost rising to the point of insurrection. The leaders of the movement were not able to keep the situation from getting out of control. The proprietors and landowners asked the government to intervene, and Prime Minister Francesco Crispi declared a state of emergency in January 1894, dissolving the organizations, arresting their leaders and restoring order through the use of extreme force. Some reforms followed, including workmen's compensation and pension schemes. The suppression of the strikes also led to an increase in emigration.

== Characteristics ==
The Fasci movement was made up of a federation of scores of associations that developed among farm workers, tenant farmers, and small sharecroppers as well as artisans, intellectuals, and industrial workers. The immediate demands of the movement were fair land rents with new sharecropping contracts that would deliver more grain to the peasant, higher wages, an end to common contractual abuses and usury, and lower local taxes and distribution of misappropriated common land. Between 1889 and 1893 some 170 Fasci were established in Sicily. According to some sources the movement reached a membership of more than 300,000 by the end of 1893. (Note: There are different estimates regarding the number of Fasci, present in all Sicilian provinces, with the highest numbers in Palermo, Agrigento, and Catania (ranging from 144 to 175), as well as regarding the number of members (from 300,000 to 400,000 according to the police, to 100,000-200,000 according to more cautious estimates).) The Fasci constituted autonomous organizations with their own insignia (red rosettes), uniforms and sometimes even musical bands, and their own local halls for reunions and congresses. They were called Fasci (fascio literally means "faggot", as in a bundle of sticks, but also "league") because everyone can break a single stick, but no one can break a bundle of sticks.

Fasci were established in 82 Sicilian towns, and in 74 of them, they organized some form of protest. The socio-economic conditions of each town often shaped the structure and role of the Fascio. In areas with large populations of wage earners – such as wheat-producing towns dominated by large estates or those with sulfur mines – the Fasci often functioned as trade unions. Among wheat-growing peasants, they sometimes acted as syndicates advocating for the expropriation of large estates. In a few towns, wage earners and their Fasci also formed agricultural and industrial cooperatives. Protests varied: in 24 towns, they centered on high taxes; in 17 towns, the Fasci led strikes or land occupations; and in 12 towns, peasants and workers organized both tax protests and work stoppages.

While many of the leaders were of socialist or anarchist leanings, few of their supporters were revolutionaries. The peasants who joined the Fasci were driven by a deep desire for social justice and believed they stood on the brink of a new era. In many of their meeting places, a crucifix hung beside the red flag, while portraits of the King shared space with those of revolutionaries like Garibaldi, Mazzini, and Marx. Their marches often took on the tone of quasi-religious processions, with chants and cheers for the King frequently echoing through the crowd. Many of the Fasci were part of the Italian Workers' Party (Partito dei Lavoratori Italiani, the initial name of the Italian Socialist Party) that had been founded at a conference in Genoa on August 14, 1892.

While the ruling elite depicted the men of the Fasci as treasonous socialists, communists and anarchists seeking to overthrow the monarchy; in fact many ordinary members were devout Catholics and monarchists. The movement sometimes had a messianic nature, characterised by statements such as "Jesus was a true socialist and wanted just what the Fasci were demanding". One of the leaders, Nicola Barbato, was known as "the workers' apostle". The rural Fasci in particular were a curious phenomenon with both ancient and modern aspects. They combined millenarian aspirations with urban intellectual leadership often in contact with workers' organizations and ideas in the more industrialized Northern Italy. According to the Marxist historian Eric Hobsbawm, the Fasci were millenarian insofar as the socialism preached by the movement was seen by the Sicilian peasantry as a new religion, the true religion of Christ – betrayed by the priests, who were on the side of the rich – that foretold the dawn of a new world, without poverty, hunger and cold, in accordance with God's will. The Fasci, which included many women, were encouraged by the messianic belief that the start of a new reign of justice was looming and the movement spread like an epidemic.

== Background ==
The Italian economy had been sliding into a deep recession since the end of the 1880s. In July 1887, the government introduced new protective tariffs on both agricultural and industrial products, triggering a trade war with France and depriving Sicily of its major export market. This conflict severely damaged Italian commerce and hit agricultural exports particularly hard – especially those from Southern Italy. Between 1888 and 1892, an agrarian crisis unfolded, marked by a sharp decline in wheat prices. Sicily's main economic outputs – wine, fruit, and sulfur – were also dealt a significant blow. (Note: The price of sulfur – a crucial industry that supported the livelihoods of approximately 50,000 Sicilian families – dropped sharply from 141 lire per ton in 1874–75 to 113 lire in 1891, and plummeted further to just 55 lire in the first half of 1894. Wine prices also collapsed, falling from 40–45 lire per hectolitre in 1887 to just 10–12 lire between 1890 and 1893. During the same period, the price of citrus fruits declined by between one-third and one-half.) In addition, the sulfur industry, which employed 100,000 people, suffered from American competition and a new synthetic process for the manufacture of sulfuric acid.

In response to the crisis, the dominant landowning class shifted much of the economic burden onto the peasantry by imposing higher rents and discriminatory local taxes, pushing many into even more extreme poverty and starvation. As social tensions escalated, a small group of young, previously unknown socialist intellectuals – many recently graduated from the University of Palermo – began to organize. Their movement gained momentum during the first term of Prime Minister Francesco Crispi (1887–1891), a period characterized by unpopular tax hikes and the ratification of laws restricting personal freedoms. The toll on peasants was especially severe. According to Hobsbawm, the Fasci were the result of the revolt of the Sicilian peasants against the introduction of capitalist relationships into the rural economy aggravated by the world depression in agriculture of the 1880s.

On top of the widespread economic hardship, Sicily also suffered from a deeply dysfunctional system of local government. Often, the mayor was also the region's largest landowner, giving him near-total control over employment – both public and private. He and his allies determined who paid local taxes and how much, and they also commanded the local police forces. Meanwhile, many Sicilian "villages" were in fact large, overcrowded agro-towns, home to 10,000 or even 40,000 peasants. This had made violent peasant uprisings – known as jacqueries – not only endemic in the countryside but also difficult to suppress. Burdened by oppressive municipal taxes and local excise duties, many villagers saw burning down the town hall – and with it, the tax records – as the most obvious form of protest.

== Foundation and rapid growth ==
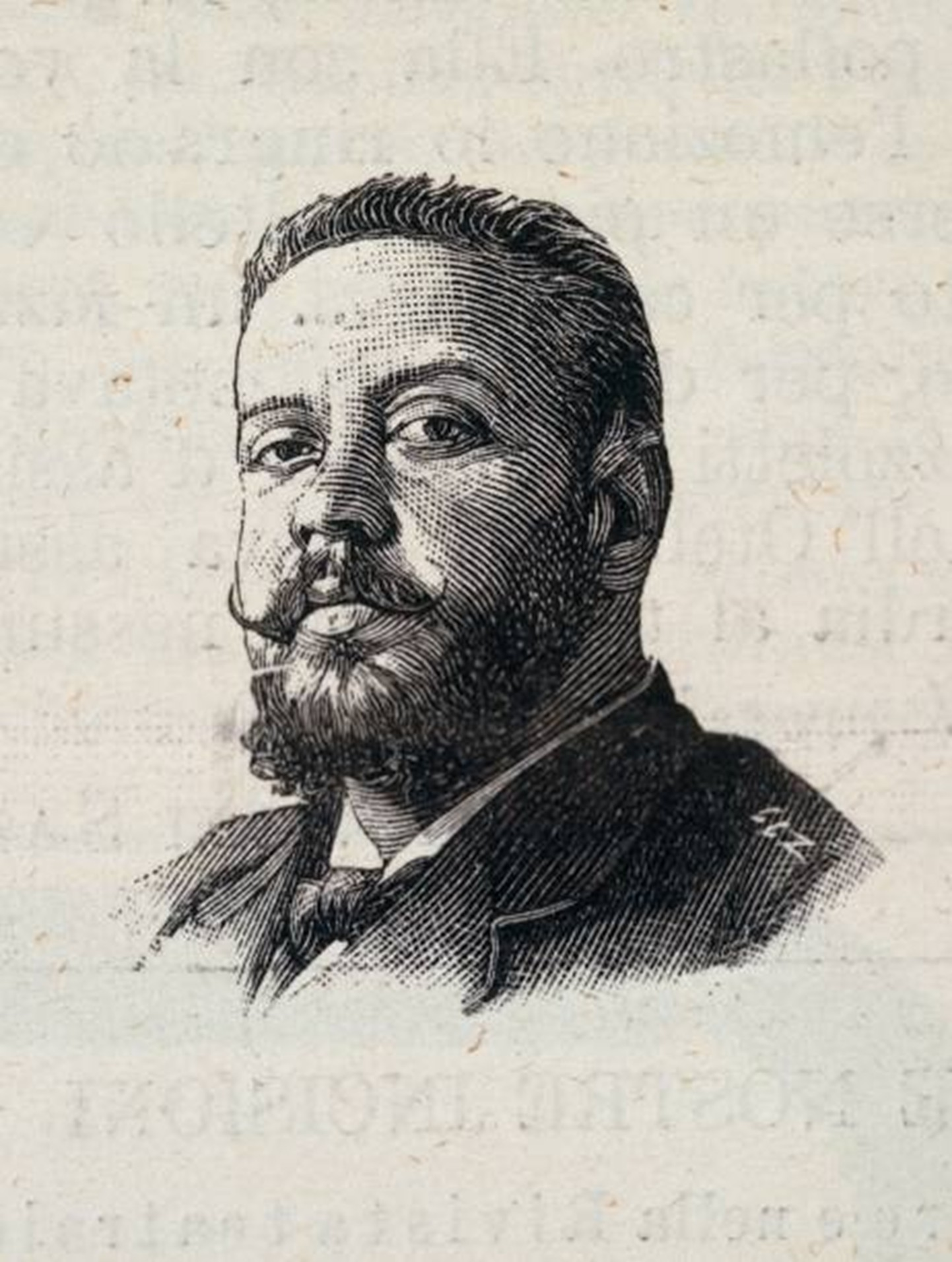
Bernardino Verro, one of the leaders of the Fasci in 1894

The first official Fascio was founded on May 1 (Labour Day), 1891, in Catania by Giuseppe de Felice Giuffrida. (Note: An earlier Fascio was set up in Messina on March 18, 1889, but was dormant after its founder, Nicola Petrina, was arrested in July of that year and not released until 1892. Another reason why the first Fascio of Messina – formed after the example of the Fasci operai ("Workers leagues") constituted in Central and North Italy from 1871 – did not develop was that it brought together not individual workers but the workers' associations of the city, which retained their independence, their status and economic orientation.) The Palermo Fascio was founded on 29 June 1892 by Rosario Garibaldi Bosco. From then on, the number of Sicilian Fasci grew significantly, rising to 24 by the end of 1892 and reaching 177 by the close of 1893. In effect, a Fascio was established in nearly every town across the island. In those few towns without a local section, residents still expressed their support by staging demonstrations of solidarity. Other prominent leaders included Nicola Barbato in Piana dei Greci, Bernardino Verro in Corleone, and Lorenzo Panepinto in Santo Stefano Quisquina.

In August 1892, Garibaldi Bosco, one of the keenest socialist among the Fasci leaders, attended the Socialist Party congress in Genoa and, upon returning, dutifully in line of the directives of the party, expelled anarchists, Mazzinians, and other non-socialist members from the Palermo Fascio. In contrast, De Felice rejected such directives from the mainland, insisting on keeping the membership of his Catania Fascio open to all factions of the radical left. He shared with Napoleone Colajanni, the father of Sicilian socialism, a vision of a unified democratic front. De Felice also continued to engage with prominent anarchists, including Amilcare Cipriani, who had participated in the defence of the Paris Commune in 1871. On these and other important issues there was much friction between Catania and Palermo. However, the leagues were not only led by socialists and anarchists; some were run by local gentry and mafiosi.

Crispi was replaced as prime minister by Antonio Di Rudinì in February 1891, who was succeeded by Giovanni Giolitti in May 1892. On January 20, 1893, when peasants of Caltavuturo occupied communal land that they claimed was theirs, local authorities killed 13 and wounded 21 in the Caltavuturo massacre. Disturbances continued throughout the year. The Fasci started out as urban movements, animated by artisans, which evolved into a more popular and combative mass movement with the adherence of sulfur miners, and in a later stage with the involvement of peasants and sharecroppers. In the autumn of 1893, labour conflicts in the cities and the mines came together with the protests and claims of the farmers. The movement reached its greatest breadth in the manifestations against taxes, involving the lowest tiers of the city and the countryside, becoming difficult, if not impossible, to control by its leaders. "In certain regions," wrote the journalist Adolfo Rossi who, at the time, travelled the island for La Tribuna, a newspaper in Rome, "a kind of contagion had spread; the mobs were possessed by the belief that a new reign of justice was imminent."

== Initial success ==
From its initial origins in Eastern Sicily, especially in Catania, the movement got its real impetus with the establishment of the Fascio of Palermo on 29 June 1892. The Leagues rapidly radiated over all Sicily. The local Fascio in Corleone, which would evolve into one of the first and best-organized groups, was founded on 8 September 1892 by Bernardino Verro. Another major Fascio, the one in Piana dei Greci, on 21 March 1893 under the leadership of Nicola Barbato. In the spring of 1893, the movement's leaders resolved to extend their propaganda to the rural peasants and miners in the Sicilian hinterland. Between March and October, the number of fasci surged from 35 to 162, with membership exceeding 200,000.

From that moment on the dynamics of the movement started to change; no longer the workers and craftsmen in the urban centres, but rather the peasants became the driving force behind the organisation. The centre of gravity moved from the city to the countryside. On 21–22 May 1893, a congress was held in Palermo attended by 500 delegates from nearly 90 leagues and socialist circles. A Central Committee was elected, composed of nine members: Giacomo Montalto for the province of Trapani, Nicola Petrina for the province of Messina, Giuseppe De Felice Giuffrida for the province of Catania, Luigi Leone for the province of Siracusa, Antonio Licata for the province of Agrigento, Agostino Lo Piano Pomar for the province of Caltanissetta, Rosario Garibaldi Bosco, Nicola Barbato and Bernardino Verro for the province of Palermo. The Congress decided that all Leagues were obliged to join the Italian Workers' Party (Partito dei Lavoratori Italiani), the predecessor of the PSI.

On 31 July 1893 a peasant conference at Corleone drafted model agrarian contracts for labourers, sharecroppers and tenants and presented them to the landowners. When those refused to negotiate, a strike against landowners and against state taxes broke out over a large part of western Sicily. The so-called Patti di Corleone (Corleone Covenants), are considered by historians to be the first trade union collective contract in capitalist Italy. In September, state authorities stepped in, and some landowners were persuaded to concede. In other areas, however, the strike persisted until November. The peasants' success proved contagious. That autumn, railway workers in Catania and Palermo, sulfur miners in the provinces of Caltanissetta, Enna and Agrigento, and numerous smaller labour groups followed suit, securing higher wages or improved working conditions.

In October 1893, a congress of miners was held in Grotte, a sulfur-mining town in the province of Agrigento, which was attended by some 1,500 people, including workers and small producers in the sulfur mines. The miners demanded that the minimum age to be raised to 14 years for those who worked in the mines, the decrease of working hours and setting a minimum wage. Small producers demanded measures to avoid exploitation by large owners who controlled the storage market and pocketed all the profits. The minimum-age measure was meant to improve the situation for the carusi, minors that worked in conditions of near-slavery that sparked public outrage and inspired many complaints.

The success of the movement alarmed the Sicilian ruling elite, who viewed the unrest as a threat that needed to be swiftly contained. Panic set in – some even called for the closure of all schools to prevent the spread of radical and subversive ideas. Prefects and anxious local councils flooded Rome with urgent appeals to immediately suppress the Fasci. Yet, despite mounting pressure from the King, the military, and conservative forces in the capital, Giolitti refused to treat the strikes – which were legal – as criminal acts. He would not dissolve the Fasci or permit the use of firearms against demonstrators. Instead, he maintained that these economic conflicts should be resolved through improvements in workers' conditions, choosing not to interfere directly.

== Rising tensions ==
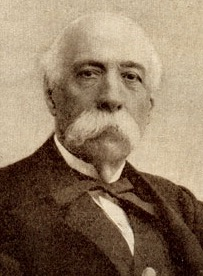
Prime Minister Francesco Crispi

Nevertheless, Giolitti recognized the necessity of curbing the unrest. Beginning in May 1893, authorities occasionally arrested Fasci leaders, and additional police and military forces were dispatched to Sicily. By the autumn of 1893, the Fasci leadership had lost control of the movement, and the agitation spiraled beyond their grasp. Peasants began occupying land, angry crowds protested for employment and against local corruption, tax offices were set ablaze, and violent clashes with police became increasingly frequent and deadly. The social unrest edged dangerously close to full-scale insurrection, prompting landowners and elites to demand government intervention.

However, Giolitti's relatively non-interventionist approach could not be maintained. His government's reluctance to use force outraged landowners, while its refusal to redistribute the latifundia frustrated the peasants. Landowners matched the strike with a lockout, and many peasants, probably a majority in the strike centres, were left without tenancies when the planting season ended in mid-December. In December 1893, the failure of the Giolitti government to restore public order gave rise to a general demand that Crispi should return to power. Giolitti had to resign on November 24, 1893, as a result of the Banca Romana scandal.

In addition to the unrest in Sicily, a wave of rioting spread through Italy in August 1893, triggered by the killing of a number of migrant workers in the salt pans of Aigues Mortes in southern France escalated into a more generalized working-class revolt supported by anarchists and violent riots in Rome and Naples. Italy seemed to be slipping to a revolution. By the time Crispi returned to power in December 1893, Italy appeared to many to be on the brink of collapse. Crispi promised important measures of land reform for the near future. He was not blind to the misery and the need for social reform. Before 1891 he had been the patron of the Sicilian working-class and many of their associations had been named after him. Colajanni, the chief architect of Giolitti's fall by exposing the scandal around Banca Romana, was first offered the Ministry of Agriculture, which he refused, then sent to Sicily on a mission of appeasement.

Crispi's good intentions got lost in the outcry for strong measures. In the three weeks of uncertainty before the government was formed, the rapid spread of violence drove many local authorities to defy Giolitti's ban on the use of firearms. In December 1893, 92 peasants lost their lives in clashes with the police and army. Government building were burned as well as flour mills and bakeries that refused to lower their prices when taxes were lowered or abolished. Eleven people were killed on December 10, 1893, in Giardinello after a rally that asked for the abolition of taxes on food and disbandment of the local field guards (guardie campestri). The protestors carried the portrait of the King taken from the municipality and burned tax files. On December 17, 1893, many people were wounded when troops fired on a manifestation in Monreale. Another 11 protestors were killed in Lercara Friddi on December 25. On January 1, 1894, 20 people were killed and many wounded in Gibellina and Pietraperzia. On January 2, there two dead in Belmonte Mezzagno and the next day 18 dead and many wounded in Marineo. Two days after, on January 5, thirteen dead and many wounded closed the series in Santa Caterina.

The disorders were not the product of a revolutionary plot, but Crispi chose to believe otherwise. On the basis of dubious documents and reports, Crispi claimed that there was an organised conspiracy to separate Sicily from Italy; the leaders of the Fasci conspired with the clerics and were financed by French gold, and war and invasion was looming.

== Crackdown ==
On January 3, 1894, Crispi declared a state of siege throughout Sicily. Army reservists were recalled and General Roberto Morra di Lavriano was dispatched with 40,000 troops. The old order was restored through the use of extreme force, including summary executions. The Fasci were outlawed, the army and the police killed scores of protesters, and wounded hundreds. Thousands of militants, including all the leaders, were put in jail or sent into internal exile. Some 1,000 persons were deported to the penal islands without trial. All working-class societies and cooperatives were dissolved and the freedom of the press, meeting and association were suspended. A solidarity revolt of anarchists and republicans in the Lunigiana was crushed as well. The government also seized the opportunity to 'revise' the electoral registers. In Catania 5,000 of the 9,000 electors were struck off.

In the early days of January, 1894 a meeting of the Central Committee of the Fasci took place in Palermo to discuss the position of the movement. Two sharply contrasting positions emerged. De Felice Giuffrida, known for his anarchist tendencies, supported the need to take advantage of the situation of unrest to provoke a revolution on the island. However, the majority took an opposite view, arguing the need to proceed peacefully. A revolt was not only inappropriate, but it would be detrimental to the movement. The meeting condemned the violent incidents in various parts of the island, and launched an appeal to stay calm and not to retaliate. In the end De Felice Giuffrida accepted the position of the majority. But the die was cast for the authorities to arrest De Felice, Montalto, Petrina, and others. Garibaldi Bosco, Barbato and Verro were arrested on board the steamship Bagnara that was about to leave for Tunis.

On February 28, 1894, Crispi presented the "evidence" for a widespread conspiracy in parliament: the so-called "International Treaty of Bisacquino", signed by the French Government, the Czar of Russia, Giuseppe De Felice, the anarchists and the Vatican, with the goal to detach Sicily from the rest of the country and put it under a Franco-Russian protectorate. The Radical deputy Felice Cavallotti ridiculed the conspiracy of Crispi, poking fun at "the famous treaty between the Emperor of Russia, the President of the French Republic, and Mr De Felice". Despite Crispi's claim to the Chamber of Deputies of 'overwhelming proof,' the conspiracy rested on dubious documents, and the later trials found no trace of a revolutionary plot. (Note: The so-called "Treaty of Bisacquino" was so named not because it was signed in the Sicilian town, but because it had been invented by the Director of Public Safety of Bisacquino, the Neapolitan Sessi.)

== Trial in Palermo ==
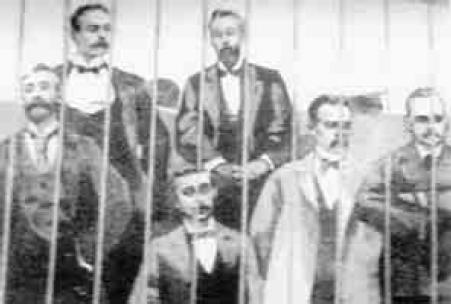
The heads of the Fasci Siciliani in the courtroom cage at the trial in April 1894

The trials of the central committee of the Fasci, that took place in Palermo in April and May 1894, were the final blow to the movement. In spite of an eloquent defence, which turned the Court into a political platform and thrilled every socialist in the country, they were condemned to heavy sentences of imprisonment. On May 30, 1894, the leaders of the movement received their sentence: Giuseppe de Felice Giuffrida to 18 years and Rosario Bosco, Nicola Barbato and Bernardino Verro to 12 years in jail.

"In front of you", Barbato told the judges, "we provided the documents and evidence of our innocence. My friends thought it necessary to support their defence legally; I will not do so. Not because I have no confidence in you, but it is the law that does not concern me. So I do not defend myself. You have to sentence: we are the elements that destroy your sacred institutions. You have to sentence: it is logical, human. I will always pay tribute to your loyalty. But we say to our friends outside: do not ask for pardon, do not ask for amnesty. Socialist civilization should not begin with an act of cowardice. We demand a condemnation, we do not ask for mercy. Martyrs are more useful to the holy cause than any propaganda. Condemn us!".

The heavy sentence aroused strong reactions in Italy and in the United States. In Palermo, a group of students went to the Teatro Bellini and asked the orchestra to perform the hymn of Garibaldi. And the theatre applauded. In March 1896, after Crispi had to resign due to the humiliating defeat of the Italian army at Battle of Adwa in Ethiopia during First Italo-Ethiopian War, the new government under Prime Minister Antonio Di Rudinì recognized the excessive brutality of the repression. Many Fasci members were pardoned and released from jail. Di Rudinì made it clear though that a reorganization of the Fasci would not be tolerated. After their release, De Felice, Barbato and Bosco were met by a large crowd of supporters in Rome, who released the horses form their carriage and dragged them to the hotel, cheering for socialism and denouncing Crispi.

== Aftermath ==
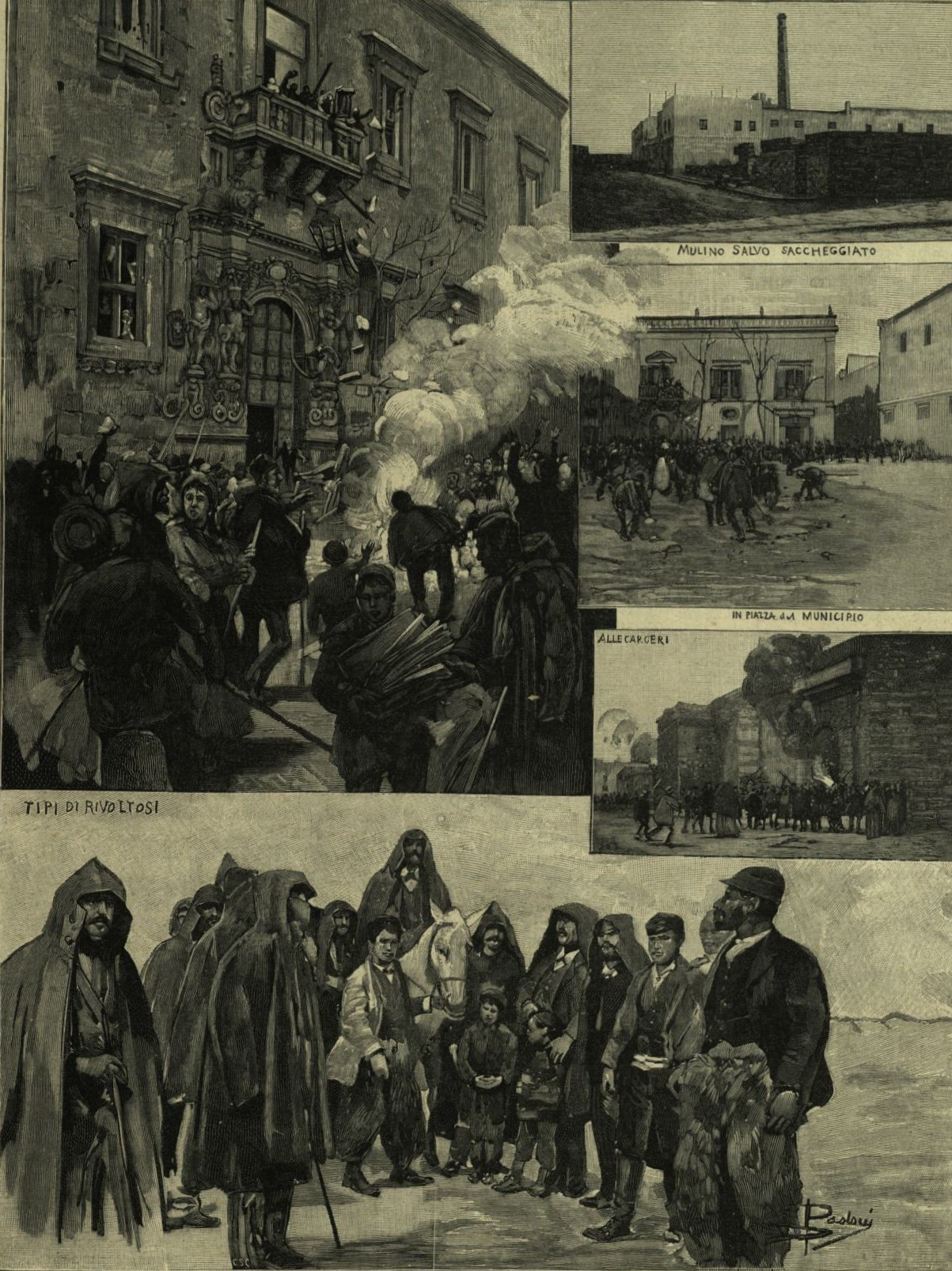
Illustrations of Fasci Siciliani protesters

The brutal repression backfired to some extent. The Fasci leaders used the military tribunals to make impassioned and well-reported speeches in their defence. The tribunals were too repressive and revolted the Liberal consciences of many Northern Italians. In an attempt to regain his former 'left wing', Crispi introduced a bill in July 1894 to take over large estates and uncultivated land. The idea was to rent out the land on long leases in medium-sized holdings and leaseholders would be given reduced credit and tax concessions. While the bill failed to convince the Radicals and democrats of Crispi's good intentions, it angered the Sicilian landowners. After the suppression of the Fasci those were now unwilling to make any concessions. Under the leadership of Di Rudiní, they battled against the bill. When Crispi fell from power after Adwa in March 1896, their proponent Di Rudiní became Prime Minister and the Sicilian landowners were safe.

Nevertheless, the revolt inspired social reforms. In 1898, two measures of social legislation were passed by the minister of the treasury of Di Rudini's cabinet, Luigi Luzzatti. The industrial workmen's compensation scheme from 1883 was made obligatory with the employer bearing all costs; and a voluntary fund for contributory disability and old age pensions was created.

Many former adherents of the Fasci left Sicily. Life had grown hard and employment difficult to find because of their involvement with the movement. For those in Sicily who wanted to change their life for the better in those days, there were only two alternatives: rebel or emigrate. After the failure of the rebellion many peasants had no choice but to vote with their feet and opted for emigration. Others remained, and a year later, in 1895, protests against unjust taxes and about the issue of communal land resumed in many towns in Sicily. The disbandment of the military troops that had to maintain order had to be postponed.

According to Hobsbawm, the Fasci were a prime example of primitive agrarian movement that became modern by aligning itself with socialism and communism. Many of its leaders continued in the Socialist Party and continued the struggle for land rights and land reform once they were released. Despite the 1894 defeat, permanent movements were set up in some areas of Sicily using modern socialist models of organisation.

With the dissolution of the Fasci, the unrest on Sicily did not subside. In January 1898, peasants demanding work and bread ransacked the town hall in Siculiana. In the fall of 1901, Sicilian peasants – following the example of numerous agrarian strikes that were affecting the whole of Italy – again set off a wave of agrarian unrest, conscious of the fact that in a way they resumed "the march abruptly interrupted in 1894 by the repression of the Fasci". Just as the Fasci movement, one of the main goals of the 1901 strikes and was a revision of the land leases to undermine the economic power of the gabellotti. After the First World War the communist movement In Sicily built on the incipient organisational structures of the Fasci, such as during the Biennio Rosso. The Fasci inspired social struggle in Sicily well into the 1950s.

== The role of women ==
The role of women in the Fasci Siciliani was substantial, but is regularly overlooked in historical accounts. Women were often at the forefront of demonstrations and strikes, speaking in public meetings and conferences. During municipal elections they made sure that men were going to vote (women did not have the right to vote at the time). They patrolled the taverns to prevent the men from betraying the duty of militancy with bottles of wine. They also took care of many organizational aspects and were particularly active in proselytizing for the movement, decorating the stage of the rallies, preparing ceremonies such as the inauguration opening of the flag of the Fasci, and welcoming the leaders who came to the towns with flowers.

Women were among the most ardent. In some municipalities the women organized themselves into women's sections and in others even in exclusively female Fasci. The strongest and most numerous presence of women was in the Fascio of Piana degli Albanesi, where over a thousand of the 3,500 members were women in a town of 9,000 inhabitants. The female Fascio delle lavoratrici had their own meeting hall where they held their own meetings; they carried their own banner when participating in protest marches. For the Fasci the women abandoned the Church, but not the religious sentiment, to protest against the priests, who had tried to frighten them and isolate them with the threat of excommunication. In Piana the women organised a boycott of annual religious procession in protest of the priest's opposition to the movement in 1893. According to the journalist Rossi, who visited the female Fasci in Piani, the women were the most enthusiastic and no less fierce than the men. In some areas, "where men are timid against authority, their wives soon convince them to join the movement of workers."

At the congress in Palermo in May 1893 where the union of all the Fasci in Sicily was decided, Maria Cammarata, of the Fascio of Piana, urged the audience to ensure the registration of women. The presence and political sophistication of the female representatives at the congress surprised the editor of the Giornale di Sicilia: "I could not believe it myself. They spoke loudly and clearly, with ease and astonishing courage." One of the most prominent women was Marietta De Felice Giuffrida, the daughter of Giuseppe de Felice Giuffrida – one of the founders of the movement. Only 14 years old, she accompanied her father throughout Sicily to help him setting up Fasci in the interior. She was "extraordinarily animated by the spirit of socialism, who spoke to the people with a fervour of a missionary, and because of her sex and age, she commanded the fascination of the masses".

The authorities watched the Fasci closely and in a report to the government in Rome noticed that the female Fasci in Piana, Belmonte Mezzagno and San Giuseppe Jato should be considered as dangerous. The women had developed "highly successful propaganda activities and revolutionary agendas, through which they exercised considerable influence on the other Fasci in the region".

== Mafia involvement ==
Some historians emphasize that the leagues were engaged in class struggle against a coalition of landowners and mafiosi and ignore evidence of strategic alliances between the Fasci and the Mafia. Although the authorities greatly exaggerated the criminal tendencies of Fasci leaders and the role of popular violence to justify the suppression of the movement, some local Fasci were in fact under the influence of mafiosi, who were exploiting the unrest for their own gain. The Mafia bosses Vito Cascioferro and Nunzio Giaimo led the Fasci in Bisacquino in alliance with Verro. The Mafia was sometimes needed to enforce flying pickets with credible threats of violence and to make the strike costly to landowners by destroying their property.

According to historian Salvatore Lupo, there was no absolute ideological incompatibility or full mutual exclusion between the Fasci and the Mafia as forms of social rebellion, often based on the same social groups but representing different models of social mobility. Although, many of the Fasci denied membership to individuals responsible for public scandal, convicts, or mafiosi, the door was not closed for those that the socialist newspaper L'Avanti! described as "a Mafia faithful to its generous origins, rooted in a legitimate rebellion against all forms of arrogance."

In order to give the strike teeth and to protect himself from harm, Verro became a member of a Mafia group in Corleone, the Fratuzzi (Little Brothers). However, during the great strike of the Fasci in September 1893, the Fratuzzi mobilized to boycott it, providing the necessary manpower to work on the lands that the peasants refused to cultivate. After that, Verro broke away from the mafiosi, and – according to police reports – became their most bitter enemy. He was killed by the Mafia in 1915 when he was the mayor of Corleone.

The Mafia played a key role in the harsh repression of the Fasci, which reaffirmed the power of landowners and mafiosi, protected by government forces. According to a study, "the spread of the Mafia in Sicily at the end of the 19th century was in part shaped by the rise of socialist peasant Fasci organizations. In an environment with weak state presence, this socialist threat triggered landholders, estate managers and local politicians to turn to the Mafia to resist and combat peasant demands." The study's findings suggest that up to 37 percent of the Mafia's strength in 1900 could be attributed to its role in suppressing the peasant Fasci.

== In literature and film ==
- Luigi Pirandello's 1913 novel I vecchi e i giovani (The Old and the Young) retraces the history of the failure and repression of the Fasci Siciliani in the period from 1893–94. Although Pirandello was not an active member of this movement, he had close ties of friendship with some of its leading ideologists – Rosario Garibaldi Bosco, Enrico La Loggia, Giuseppe De Felice Giuffrida and Francesco De Luca –, when he studied at the Department of Law of the University of Palermo.
- The film Il giorno di San Sebastiano (Saint Sebastian's Day) (1993), directed by Pasquale Scimeca, is based on the Caltavuturo massacre on January 20, 1893, when during the celebration of Saint Sebastian, a firing squad killed 15 peasants who claimed their right to state-owned land. It won a Golden Globe and was presented at the Venice film festival. The play, a monologue depicting a peasant woman whose husband was killed in the events at Caltavuturo, was written by Rosario Garibaldi Bosco and first performed on February 2, 1893, in Palermo to raise money for the victims.
- 1893. L'inchiesta (2013) a documentary film written and directed by Nella Condorelli, is based on the book L'agitazione in Sicilia: Inchiesta sui Fasci dei lavoratori. The book is an eyewitness account by the journalist Adolfo Rossi, who in October 1893 reported on the turmoil in Sicily for the liberal Roman daily La Tribuna. He was the only journalist to make the journey to the island at a time when the mainstream press in northern Italy echoed the government's stance, framing the unrest as a matter of public order and relying mainly on police reports. Rossi travelled extensively across Sicily, interviewing members and leaders of the Fasci and bringing their voices to light. Since its publication, this unique work has been widely cited and remains a key source for anyone writing about the Fasci Siciliani. The Sicilian deputy Napoleone Colajanni drew on Rossi's accounts during parliamentary debates, using them as part of his efforts to challenge the government's response.

== Sources ==
- Acemoglu, Daron; Giuseppe De Feo & Giacomo De Luca (December 2017). Weak States: Causes and Consequences of the Sicilian Mafia, NBER Working Paper No. 24115, Cambridge, MA: National Bureau of Economic Research.
- Alcorn, John (2004). Revolutionary Mafiosi: Voice and Exit in the 1890s., in: Paolo Viola & Titti Morello (eds.), L'associazionismo a Corleone: Un'inchiesta storica e sociologica (Istituto Gramsci Siciliano, Palermo, 2004).
- Andretta, Marzia (2005). "I corleonesi e la storia della mafia. Successo, radicamento e continuità". Meridiana (54): 211–232. ISSN 0394-4115.
- Blok, Anton (1974). The Mafia of a Sicilian Village, 1860–1960: A Study of Violent Peasant Entrepreneurs (1988 ed.). Prospect Heights, IL: Waveland Press. ISBN 0-88133-325-5.
- (in Italian) Burba, Elisabetta (2013). Da arbëreshë a italo-americani. Il caso degli italo-albanesi di Madison, Wisconsin (USA) 1892 - 1943, Palermo: Pitti, ISBN 978-88-965-6931-3
- Clark, Martin (2008). Modern Italy, 1871 to the present, Harlow: Pearson Education. ISBN 1-4058-2352-6.
- Cartosio, Bruno (1992). "Sicilian Radicals in Two Worlds". In Debouzy, Marianne (ed.). In the Shadow of the Statue of Liberty: Immigrants, Workers, and Citizens in the American Republic, 1880-1920. Champaign (IL): University of Illinois Press. p. 117-128. ISBN 0-252-06252-3.
- Cody, Gabrielle H. & Evert Sprinchorn (2007). The Columbia encyclopedia of modern drama, Volume 2, New York: Columbia University Press. ISBN 978-0-231-14424-7.
- (in Italian) Colajanni, Napoleone (1895). Gli avvenimenti di Sicila e le loro cause, Palermo: Remo Sandron Editore.
- De Grand, Alexander J. (2001). The hunchback's tailor: Giovanni Giolitti and liberal Italy from the challenge of mass politics to the rise of fascism, 1882-1922, Greenwood Publishing Group. ISBN 0-275-96874-X.
- Dickie, John (2004). Cosa Nostra. A history of the Sicilian Mafia, London: Hodder & Stoughton, ISBN 0-340-82435-2
- Duggan, Christopher (2008). The Force of Destiny: A History of Italy Since 1796, Boston/New York: Houghton Mifflin Harcourt. ISBN 0-618-35367-4.
- Fracchia, Joseph (2010). ""Hora": Social Conflicts and Collective Memories in Piana degli Albanesi". Past & Present (209): 181–222. doi:10.1093/pastj/gtq030. JSTOR 40960937.
- Gabaccia, Donna R. (1988). Militants and Migrants: Rural Sicilians become American workers, New Brunswick, N.J.: Rutgers University Press ISBN 0-8135-1318-9.
- Guglielmo, Jennifer (2010). Living the Revolution: Italian Women's Resistance and Radicalism in New York City, 1880-1945, University of North Carolina Press. ISBN 978-0-8078-3356-8.
- Hobsbawm, Eric J. (1959/1971). Primitive rebels; studies in archaic forms of social movement in the 19th and 20th centuries, Manchester: Manchester University Press. ISBN 0-7190-0493-4.
- (in Italian) Leoni, Francesco (2001). Storia dei partiti politici italiani, Naples: Guida Editori. ISBN 88-7188-495-7.
- Lupo, Salvatore (2009). The History of the Mafia, New York: Columbia University Press, ISBN 978-0-231-13134-6
- Mack Smith, Denis (1997). Modern Italy: A Political History. Ann Arbor: The University of Michigan Press. ISBN 0-472-10895-6.
- (in Italian) Renda, Francesco (1977). I fasci siciliani: 1892-94, Turin: Einaudi. ISBN 88-0648-413-3.
- (in Italian) Rossi, Adolfo (1894). L'agitazione in Sicilia. Inchiesta sui Fasci dei lavoratori, Milan: Max Kantorowicz Edit.
- Schneider, Jane & Peter Schneider. Culture and Political Economy in Western Sicily, New York: Academic Press. ISBN 0-12-627850-4
- (in Italian) Scolaro, Gabriella (2008), Il movimento antimafia siciliano: Dai Fasci dei lavoratori all'omicidio di Carmelo Battaglia, Lulu.com. ISBN 1-4092-2951-3.
- Seton-Watson, Christopher (1967). Italy from liberalism to fascism, 1870–1925. London: Methuen & Co Ltd. ISBN 0-416-18940-7.
