= Ciancio =

Ciancio is an Italian surname. Notable people with the surname include:

- Angela Ciancio (born 2000), known as Lil Jolie, Italian singer-songwriter
- Daniela Ciancio (born 1965), Italian costume designer
- Gaetano Ciancio (born 1956), Italian transplant surgeon
- Josephine Gatt Ciancio (born 1946), Maltese social scientist, and minor philosopher
- Nick Ciancio (born 1947), Australian weightlifter
- Simone Ciancio (born 1987), Italian footballer

== See also ==
- De Ciancio, surname
