= Lunigiana revolt =

1894 revolt in Tuscany, Italy

- Carabinieri stopped by a barricade of marble from the quarries near Carrara (Source: L'Illustrazione Popolare, February 4, 1894)

The Lunigiana revolt took place in January 1894, in the stone and marble quarries of Massa and Carrara in the Lunigiana, the northernmost tip of Tuscany (Italy), in support of the Fasci Siciliani (Sicilian Leagues) uprising on Sicily. After a state of siege had been proclaimed by the Crispi government, armed bands dispersed into the mountains pursued by troops. Hundreds of insurgents were arrested and tried by military tribunals.

== Background ==
According to a New York Times article of 1894, workers in the marble quarries were among the most neglected labourers in Italy. Many of them were ex-convicts or fugitives from justice. The work at the quarries was so tough that almost any aspirant worker with sufficient muscle and endurance was employed, regardless of their background.

The quarry workers, including the stone carvers, had radical beliefs that set them apart from others. Anarchism and general radicalism became part of the heritage of the stone carvers. Many violent revolutionists who had been expelled from Belgium and Switzerland went to Carrara in 1885 and founded the first anarchist group in Italy. The district in which the quarries are situated was consequently the original hotbed of anarchism in Italy. In Carrara, the anarchist Galileo Palla remarked, "even the stones are anarchists."

== Revolt ==
The revolt started when on January 13, 1894, with a demonstration against the government crackdown of the Fasci Siciliani a popular movement of democratic and socialist inspiration in 1891–1894 on Sicily, who had risen up against the ever-increasing taxes on the prices of basic commodities, such as bread, and for land reform. On January 3, 1894, Prime minister Francesco Crispi had declared a state of siege throughout Sicily. Army reservists were recalled and General Roberto Morra di Lavriano was dispatched with 40,000 troops. The old order was restored through the use of extreme force, including summary executions.

As two Carabinieri tried to disperse the crowd, shooting from both sides ensued and one guard was killed while another badly injured. Several demonstrators were also injured and one killed. Police barracks and headquarters were attacked and protestors made off with weapons. A tax office in Carrara was set on fire and the main road to the neighbouring town of Massa was barricaded with huge marble blocks. Large bands of workers tried to march into the town of Carrara on January 14 and into Massa on January 16, but were stopped by the military.

By the following morning the city of Carrara was surrounded by soldiers under the command of General Nicola Heusch. A state of siege had been proclaimed by the Crispi government on January 16, 1894. Among those threatened with arrest were many quarry workers, who responded by declaring a general strike. Instead of going to work, they came down from the mountains and gathered around the military barracks where hundreds of prisoners had already been detained. Troops were then ordered to amass and, as soon as the crowd came near enough, they fired. Eleven deaths resulted, as well as numerous other casualties. (Other sources mention 8 people killed and 13 wounded). Armed bands dispersed into the mountains pursued by troops.

== Aftermath ==
Hundreds of insurgents were arrested and tried by military tribunals. On January 31, 1894, a military tribunal condemned the anarchist Luigi Molinari to 23 years imprisonment as the instigator of the insurrection. A protest movement was mounted and Molinari was amnestied on September 20, 1895.

Later that year in June 1894 an Italian anarchist killed French President Carnot and an anarchist attack on Prime Minister Crispi on June 16, 1894, increased the fear of anarchism. In this climate, Crispi was able to introduce a series of anti-anarchist laws in July 1894, which were also used against socialists. Heavy penalties were announced for "incitement to class hatred" and police received extended powers of preventive arrest and deportation.

Some observers assert that the revolt was organized by the anarchist movement with a well defined plan, while others claim that the insurrectionary outcome exceeded the original intentions of the leaders who only wanted to stage a protest demonstration. Prime Minister Crispi explained the uprising as a conspiracy with "a broader subsersive plan that linked Apuan insurgents to those of Sicily, to the libertarian centres in Italy and abroad, and through the latter to the dark maneuvers of foreign powers."

== Sources ==
- Clark, Martin (2008). Modern Italy, 1871 to the present, Harlow: Pearson Education. ISBN 1-4058-2352-6.
- Colajanni, Napoleone (1895). Gli avvenimenti di Sicila e le loro cause, Palermo: Remo Sandron Editore
- Seton-Watson, Christopher (1967). Italy from liberalism to fascism, 1870–1925. London: Methuen & Co Ltd. ISBN 0-416-18940-7.
- Tilly, Charles; Louise Tilly & Richard H. Tilly (1975). The rebellious century, 1830–1930, Harvard University Press, ISBN 0674749553
- Turcato, Davide (2012), Making Sense of Anarchism: Errico Malatesta’s Experiments with Revolution, 1889-1900, Palgrave Macmillan, ISBN 978-0230-30179-5
