= Maria Cammarata =

Italian politician

Maria Cammarata, was a prominent female leader of the Fascio dei lavoratori in Piana dei Greci (now Piana degli Albanesi), part of the Fasci Siciliani movement. The role of women in the Fasci Siciliani was substantial, but is regularly overlooked in historical accounts.

The Pianese Fascio, organized in March 1893 by Nicola Barbato, was made up of two parts: a male section with about 2,500 members, and a female section with over 1,000 women. The female Fascio delle lavoratrici had their own meeting hall where they held their own meetings; they carried their own banner when participating in protest marches. In Piana the women organised a boycott of annual religious procession in protest of the priest’s opposition to the movement in 1893.

At the congress in Palermo in May 1893 where the union of all the Fasci in Sicily was decided, Maria Cammarata, of the Fascio of Piana, urged the audience to ensure the registration of women. The presence and political sophistication of the female representatives at the congress surprised the male editor of the Giornale di Sicilia: "I could not believe it myself. They spoke loudly and clearly, with ease and astonishing courage."

== Sources ==
- Guglielmo, Jennifer (2010). Living the Revolution: Italian Women's Resistance and Radicalism in New York City, 1880-1945, University of North Carolina Press, ISBN 978-0-8078-3356-8
- Hobsbawm, Eric J. (1959/1971). Primitive rebels; studies in archaic forms of social movement in the 19th and 20th centuries, Manchester: Manchester University Press, ISBN 0-7190-0493-4
