= De Ciancio =

De Ciancio (or de Ciancio) is a surname. Notable people with the surname include:

- Pedro de Ciancio (born 1938), Argentine footballer
- Rodrigo De Ciancio (born 1995), Argentine footballer

== See also ==
- Ciancio
