= Caterina Volpicelli =

Italian Catholic religious foundress and saint

Saint Caterina Volpicelli ASCV

Virgin
- Born: 21 January 1839; Naples, Kingdom of the Two Sicilies
- Died: 28 December 1894 (aged 55); Naples, Kingdom of Italy
- Venerated in: Catholic Church (Volpicelli Handmaids of the Sacred Heart)
- Beatified: 29 April 2001, Saint Peter's Square, by Pope John Paul II
- Canonized: 26 April 2009, Saint Peter's Square by Pope Benedict XVI
- Feast: 28 December
- Attributes: religious habit of the Volpicelli Handmaids, rosary

Caterina Volpicelli, ASCV (21 January 1839 – 28 December 1894) was an Italian religious sister and the foundress of the Volpicelli Handmaids of the Sacred Heart, dedicated to education, who has been declared a saint by the Catholic Church. She was beatified on 29 April 2001 by Pope John Paul II, and canonized on 26 April 2009 by Pope Benedict XVI.

== Biography ==
Caterina Volpicelli was born in Naples on January 21, 1839, to Peter and Teresa de Micheroux. Her family belonged to the Neapolitan high bourgeoisie and she had a deep Christian faith. She spent her adolescence loving the theatre, music, literature, and after a strong existential crisis, began to gain awareness of a calling to religious life. At first, she thought her vocation was to contemplative life, which she tried but had to abandon due to frail health. A priest, Saint Ludovico of Casoria, helped her understand she was instead called to live the evangelical counsels while "remaining in the midst of society." She devoted herself to the diffusion of the Apostleship of Prayer along with some assistants. Thanks to Father Ramière, Volpicelli found a French foundation matching her objectives.

The French institution was aggregated to the new Congregation of the Missionaries of the Sacred Heart of Jesus by Jean-Jules Chevalier. It was called the "Third Order of the Sacred Heart" and it was led by Louise-Thérèse de Montaignac. The Archbishop of Naples, Sisto Riario Sforza, having understood the nascent Neapolitan foundation had its own personality versus that of de Montaignac, decided the two institutions were to be separated. In 1874, Volpicelli's foundation was approved by the Archbishop of Naples with the official name Pia Unione delle Ancelle del Sacro Cuore ("Pious Union of the Handmaid’s of the Sacred Heart").

However, Catherina felt the need to receive approval also from the Holy See. The originality and the novelty in form of her foundation, which desired to be recognized as an authentic religious institution with a public profession of vows, aroused many perplexities and open hostility, especially among the Roman clergy. The various difficulties were overcome, and in June 1890 the Istituto delle Ancelle del Sacro Cuore di Gesù ("Institute of the Handmaids of the Sacred Heart of Jesus") obtained a Decree of Praise from the Sacred Congregation of Bishops and Regulars, without changing its innovative design.

Volpicelli herself died on December 28, 1894, leaving great uncertainty in the young institution, which still needed her charismatic presence.

== Veneration ==
Volpicelli's writings were approved by theologians on April 23, 1910, and her beatification process was formally opened on January 11, 1911, granting her the title of a Servant of God. She was declared venerable on March 25, 1945 by Pope Pius XII. On June 28, 1999, John Paul II promulgated the Decree on the miracle attributed to her intercession. On 29 April 2001, Pope John Paul proclaimed Volpicelli blessed. On December 6, 2008, Pope Benedict XVI signed the decree recognizing a miracle attributed to her intercession. She was canonized in St. Peter's Square on April 26, 2009 by Pope Benedict XVI.

Her liturgical feast is on 22 January. A commemorative plaque has been placed in 30 Port‘Alba Street in Naples marking her birthplace.
