= Salvatore Lupo =

Italian historian

Salvatore Lupo (Italian pronunciation: [salvaˈtoːre ˈluːpo]; born 7 July 1951) is an Italian historian and author from Siena, specializing in the Sicilian Mafia.

Lupo is a professor of contemporary history at the University of Palermo, previously professor of contemporary history at the University of Catania. He is the president of the Southern Institute of History and Social Sciences of Catania and deputy director of the quarterly magazine of the institute, Meridiana, of which he was one of the founders. He is a member of the editorial board of "Storica".

He is one of the most highly-rated mafia scholars in the Italian context, author of numerous publications on the crime phenomenon and contemporary history; he authored Quando la Mafia trovò l'America, which, in 2009, won the Brancati Prize.

On 1 December 2015, in Rome, he was invited to the hearing of the "Parliamentary Commission of Inquiry into the Mafia phenomenon and other criminal associations, including foreign ones", as part of the investigation into the relationship between the Mafia and politics in Sicily.

== Works ==
- Blocco agrario e crisi in Sicilia tra le due guerre, Napoli, Guida, 1981. ISBN 88-7042-082-5.
- Agricoltura ricca nel sottosviluppo. Storia e mito della Sicilia agrumaria. (1860-1950), Catania, s. n., 1984.
- La dimora di Demetra. Storia, tecnica e mito dell'agricoltura siciliana, et Al., Palermo, Gelka, 1989. ISBN 88-7162-003-8.
- Il giardino degli aranci. Il mondo degli agrumi nella storia del Mezzogiorno, Venezia, Marsilio, 1990. ISBN 88-317-5310-X.
- I proprietari terrieri nel Mezzogiorno, in Storia dell'agricoltura italiana in età contemporanea, II, Uomini e classi, Venezia, Marsilio, 1990. ISBN 88-317-5381-9.
- Storia della mafia. Dalle origini ai nostri giorni, Roma, Donzelli, 1993. ISBN 88-7989-020-4; 1996. ISBN 88-7989-321-1; 2004. ISBN 88-7989-903-1.
- Andreotti, la mafia, la storia d'Italia, Roma, Donzelli, 1996. ISBN 88-7989-255-X.
- Mafia, politica, storia d'Italia: a proposito del processo Andreotti, in Antimafia, Roma, Donzelli, 1996. ISBN 88-7989-269-X.
- Il fascismo. La politica in un regime totalitario, Roma, Donzelli, 2000. ISBN 88-7989-580-X.
- Antifascismo, anticomunismo e anti-antifascismo nell'Italia repubblicana, in AA.VV., Antifascismo e identità europea, Roma, Carocci, 2004. ISBN 88-430-2934-7.
- Partito e antipartito. Una storia politica della prima Repubblica, 1946-78, Roma, Donzelli, 2004. ISBN 88-7989-769-1.
- Che cos'è la mafia. Sciascia e Andreotti, l'antimafia e la politica, Roma, Donzelli, 2007. ISBN 88-6036-112-5.
- From Palermo to America. L'iconografia commerciale dei limoni di Sicilia, with Antonino Buttitta and Sergio Troisi, Palermo, Sellerio, 2007. ISBN 9788876811586.
- Quando la mafia trovò l'America. Storia di un intreccio intercontinentale, 1888-2008, Torino, Einaudi, 2008. ISBN 978-88-06-18598-5.
- Potere criminale. Intervista sulla storia della mafia, intervista a cura di Gaetano Savatteri, Roma-Bari, Laterza, 2010. ISBN 978-88-420-9338-1.
- Il passato del nostro presente. Il lungo Ottocento 1776-1913, Roma-Bari, Laterza, 2010. ISBN 978-88-420-9399-2.
- Il tenebroso sodalizio. Il primo rapporto di polizia sulla mafia siciliana, postfazione di John Dickie, Roma, XL, 2011. ISBN 978-88-6083-041-8.
- L'unificazione italiana. Mezzogiorno, Rivoluzione, Guerra civile, Roma, Donzelli, 2011. ISBN 978-88-6036-627-6.
- Antipartiti. Il mito della nuova politica nella storia della Repubblica (prima, seconda e terza), Roma, Donzelli, 2013. ISBN 978-88-6036-856-0
- Il fascismo: la politica in un regime totalitario, Milano, Feltrinelli, 2013. ISBN 978-88-07-88294-4
- La mafia non ha vinto. Il labirinto della trattativa, with Giovanni Fiandaca, Roma-Bari, Laterza, 2014. ISBN 978-88-581-1046-1
- La questione: come liberare la storia del Mezzogiorno dagli stereotipi, Roma, Donzelli, 2015. ISBN 978-88-6843-232-4
- La mafia. Centosessant'anni di Storia. Tra Sicilia e America, Roma, Donzelli, 2018. ISBN 978-88-6843-825-8
