= Rosario Garibaldi Bosco =

Italian politician

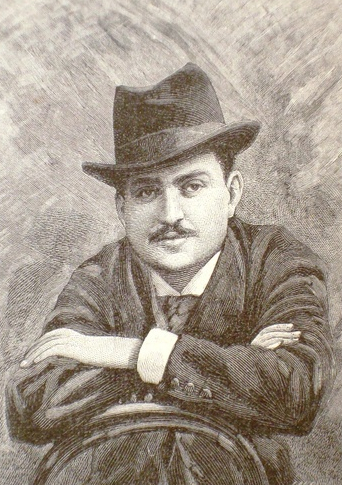
- Rosario Garibaldi Bosco in 1894
- Born: 28 July 1866; Palermo, Italy
- Died: 2 December 1936 (aged 70); Turin, Italy
- Occupations: Accountant, politician and playwright
- Known for: Prominent socialist leader of the Fasci Siciliani

Rosario Garibaldi Bosco (Palermo, July 28, 1866 – Turin, December 2, 1936) was an Italian Republican-inspired socialist, politician and writer from Sicily. He was one of the leaders of the Fasci Siciliani (Sicilian Leagues), a popular movement of democratic and socialist inspiration in 1891-1894.

== Early life ==
Born in Palermo, the son of Nicola and Teresa Patorno, he graduated in accountancy in 1886. He married Concetta Seminara and became a political activist in radical and socialist circles inspired by Napoleone Colajanni, known as the father of Sicilian socialism.

As the secretary of worker associations, he collaborated with La Lega sociale (Social League) in 1882. At the end of 1883, he founded a local radical association and its radical organ L'Italia del popolo (Italy of the people), of which he became the responsible editor. After being employed as an accountant at a private company, at the end of 1884 the association moved toward anarchist ideas and the journal changed its name to Proletario (Proletarian) in June 1885.

In 1886, after a spell as a clerk at the Banco Sagestana in Castelvetrano, he returned to Palermo and initiated the establishment of the Fascio operaio anarchico (Anarchist Worker League), managing various press outlets, such as the Il Fascio operaio (The Worker League) (1887), La Lega operaia (The Workers League) (1887), and L'Isola (The Island) (1889).

After the dissolution of the Worker League in 1889 and judicial proceedings against him, he reconciled with Colajanni and joined his new radical association. In 1891, he became the director of his newspaper L'Isola (The Island). After a trip to Milan and Paris, he abandoned anarchism while studying the organizational model of the Bourse du travail (French for "labour exchanges"), to import them in Sicily.

== Fasci Siciliani ==
He founded the Fasci dei lavoratori in Palermo (June 29, 1892) and was part of the central committee of the Fasci Siciliani (1893-1894). He was the keenest socialist among the Fasci leaders. In August 1892 he attended the Italian Socialist Party congress at Genoa and on his return obediently purged his fascio of its anarchist and other non-socialist members. In contrast, Giuseppe De Felice Giuffrida, the founder of the Catania Fascio, rejected such directives from the mainland, insisting on keeping the membership of his Catania Fascio open to all factions of the radical left. He shared with Colajanni a vision of a unified democratic front. On these and other important issues there was much friction between Catania and Palermo.

Following the repression by the government of Francesco Crispi, he was arrested on January 16, 1894 and was brought to trial. Acquitted on charges of armed conspiracy, he was nevertheless sentenced to 12 years for incitement to civil war. After two years he was released in March 1896 as the result of a pardon recognizing the excessive brutality of the repression. After his release, Bosco and the other Fasci leaders De Felice Giuffrida and Nicola Barbato were met by a large crowd of supporters in Rome, who released the horses form their carriage and dragged them to the hotel, cheering for socialism and denouncing Crispi.

== Elected in Parliament ==
On May 26, 1895, while still in prison for the Fasci revolt, he was elected to the Italian Chamber of Deputies for the district of Palermo in a local by-election. He was a candidate in protest against the repression of the Fasci Siciliani in many national electoral districts. His appointment was canceled because his age was less than that required by law.

In 1896 he founded the Socialist Federation of Palermo (Italian: Federazione socialista palermitana). Initially he joined the revolutionary current but passed over to more moderate positions. He wrote regularly for the news outlet of the organisation, Il Giornale dei lavoratori.

As a result of his more moderate politics that advocated alliances with bourgeois parties, Bosco became active in municipal politics in his home-town Palermo. In July 1900, 18 socialist deputies were elected in the Palermo city council. He became a councilor and vice-mayor in consecutive city administrations.

== Camera del Lavoro ==
Garibaldi Bosco had gone to Paris (France) to study the organizational model of Bourse du travail (French for "labour exchanges"), a kind of labour council, where working class organizations encouraged mutual aid, education, and self-organization amongst their members. As a result, he founded the Camera del Lavoro in Palermo in September 1901. In his inaugural speech he urged moderation to the workers and to take an interest organization, rather than strikes.

The objective of Bosco – "more organization instead of strikes" – became more difficult as workers' demands increased and the idea of the general strike matured. He warned that workers should have an interest in the consolidation of industries as well. Accused of "worker parasitism," he had to leave the direction of the Camera del Lavoro. Shortly thereafter he resigned from the socialist club and founded his own short-lived journal, Il Giornale dei lavoratori (The Journal of Workers) in 1903. He became the spokesman of a moderate line, looking to the general interests of Sicily.

== Playwright ==
He was also a realist writer, and his play Il giorno di San Sebastiano (Saint Sebastian Day) was the namesake feature film written and directed by Pasquale Scimeca in 1993. The play is based on the Caltavuturo massacre on January 20, 1893, when during the celebration of Saint Sebastian, a firing squad killed 13 peasants who claimed their right to state-owned land. The play, a monologue depicting a peasant woman whose husband was killed in the events at Caltavuturo, was first performed on February 2, 1893, in Palermo to raise money for the victims.

During a trip in Libya he contracted a kidney disease (nephritis) exacerbating his already weak physical condition due to his 27-month imprisonment in 1894-1896. In 1912, he briefly followed Leonida Bissolati, who was expelled from the Socialist Party because he did not oppose the war on Turkey for the conquest of Libya, and founded the Federazione socialista siciliana (Sicilian Socialist Federation). In 1915, he withdrew completely from public life. Enriched with the fashion store run by his partner - in 1912 he had separated from his first wife - and after opening two restaurants in 1925, he was expelled from the list of subversives. He died in Turin on December 2, 1936.

== Writings ==
- Di chi la colpa? Gli operai di Palermo all'Italia, seconda edizione, Palermo, Tip. editrice "Tempo" Giovanni Bondi e Domenico Vena, 1887.
- I fasci dei lavoratori. Il loro programma ed i loro fini. Dedicato al comm. Sensales direttore della pubblica sicurezza in Italia, Palermo, Uff. della Giustizia sociale, 1893.
- La camera del lavoro ed i moderati, Palermo, U. Cervelli, 1901.
