= Josephine Gatt Ciancio =

Maltese social scientist and philosopher

- Born: 1946 (age 79–80); Msida, Malta
- Education: University of Malta; California Miramar University
- Occupation: Philosophy

Josephine Gatt Ciancio (born 1946) is a Maltese social scientist, and minor philosopher. In philosophy she is mostly interested in Possible-world theories.

== Life ==
Gatt Ciancio was born at Msida, Malta, in 1946. She studied at the University of Malta, from who acquired a Bachelor of Arts in Maltese Language, English Language, and Mediterranean Studies (1973). She also studied at the California Miramar University in Los Angeles, California, United States. From here she acquired a Master's degree in Science with a major in Neuroscience. She also conducted studies in Social Democracy and Political Economy. In 1967 Gatt Ciancio began teaching in Malta at a primary level, and in 1969 proceeded to teach on a secondary level (till 1975). Later she taught at the sixth level of education (1976). Somewhat active in party politics with the Labour Party in Malta, in 1989 she edited the pages reserved for the political affairs of women in weekly paper of the General Workers Union, It-Torca (under the pseudonym 'Anna'). Between 1991 and 1993 she was Co-ordinator of the Adult Education programme of the Guzè Ellul Mercer Foundation.

== Works ==
Though the published works of Gatt Ciancio are few, together with philosophical argumentation they might be considered as explorations into what might be possible and even beyond. Her main interests in her works are of a social and political nature, very often connecting to the concept of an undivided world with no frontiers. Her main publications are the following:

- 1977 - Power to the Man in the Street. A 62-page book published in Malta, which, in its speculative projection, is quite ambitious, for not only does it uphold a political theory but furthermore proposes an interesting political programme. Essentially, Gatt Ciancio puts forward the possibility of future world unity based on the emancipation of so-called 'superdwarf' humans. This will create a peaceful, fraternal and laborious people. This type of human being will be motivated to improve humankind's cultural levels for pure intellectual pleasure. The 'superdwarf' people will prolong life, perhaps even through a form of 'materialistic immortality'.
- 1992 - Tomorrow We Shall Be Here. A 94-page book published in Malta which is basically a novel. In it Gatt Ciancio imagines a future world in which, though advanced socially and technologically, is still plagued with party revelry, corruption and political religion. Through difficult situations, hope is found in education, especially through communication.

== See also ==
- Philosophy in Malta
