= Ernesto Cianciolo =

Italian politician

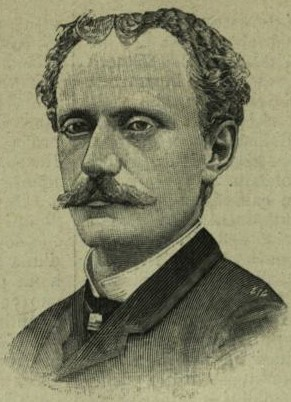

Personal details
- Born: 6 November 1856 Messina, Kingdom of the Two Sicilies
- Died: 29 May 1905 (aged 48) Messina

Baron Ernesto Cianciolo (1856–1905) was an Italian politician. He became sindaco (mayor) of Messina, Sicily, in 1887. From 10 December 1890 to 17 May 1900 he was a member of the Camera dei Deputati of the Parliament of the Kingdom of Italy, in the 17th, 18th, 19th and 20th legislatures.
