= Caltavuturo =

- Comune
- Comune di Caltavuturo
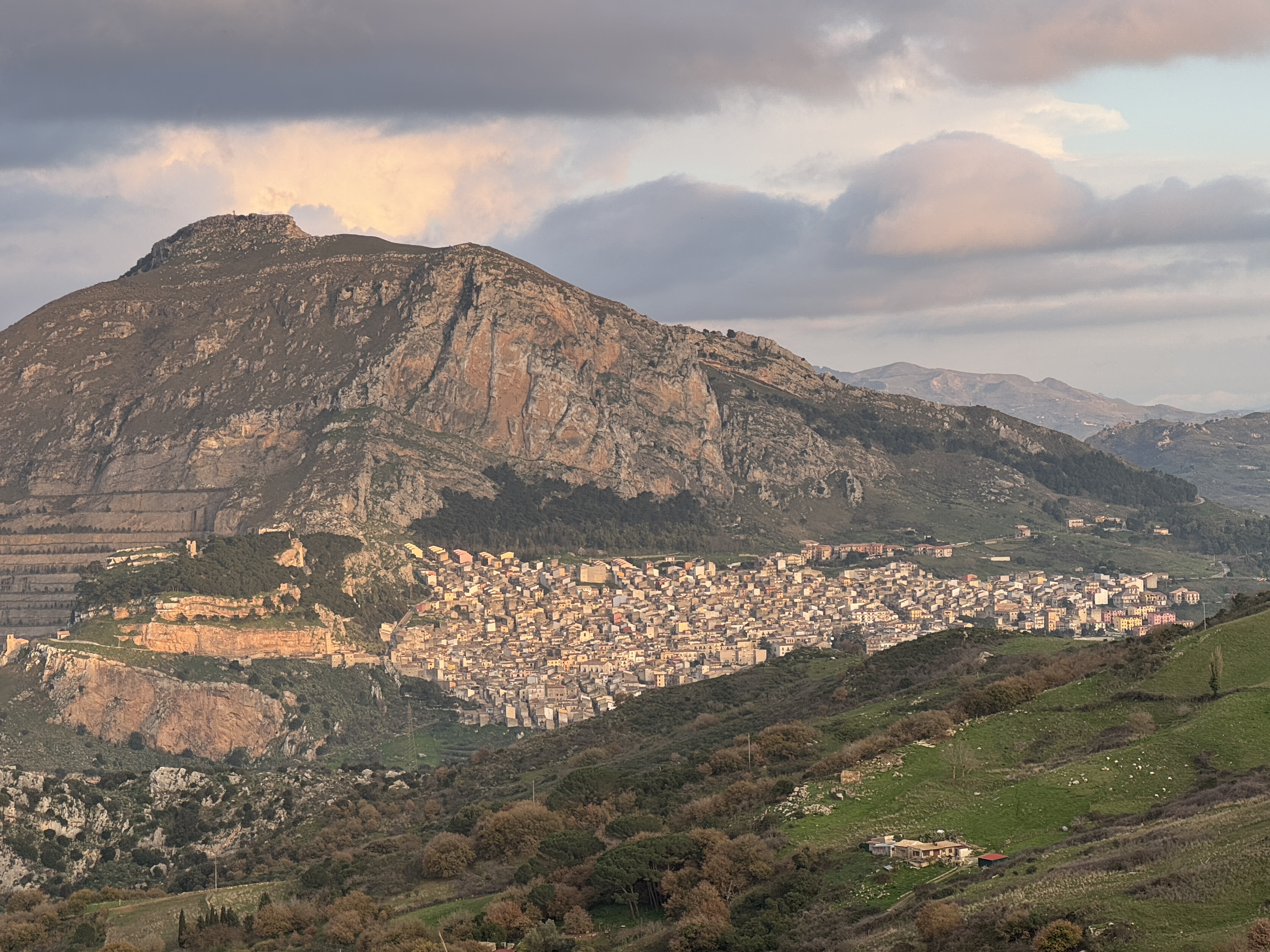
- Panorama of the comune

- Coat of arms

- Location within Italy Location within Sicily
- Coordinates: 37°49′N 13°53′E
- Country: Italy
- Region: Sicily
- Metropolitan city: Palermo (PA)

Government
  - Mayor: Domenico Giannopolo (since 14 June 2004)

Area
  - Total: 97.2 km^{2} (37.5 sq mi)
- Elevation: 635 m (2,083 ft)

Population (2004)
  - Total: 4,440
  - Density: 45.7/km^{2} (118/sq mi)
- Demonym: Caltavuturesi
- Time zone: UTC+1 (CET)
  - Summer (DST): UTC+2 (CEST)
- Postal code: 90022
- Dialing code: 0921
- Patron saint: Maria Santissima del Soccorso
- Website: Official website

Caltavuturo (Sicilian: Caltavuturu) is a town and comune in the Metropolitan City of Palermo, Sicily, Italy. The neighboring comunes are Polizzi Generosa, Scillato and Sclafani Bagni.

== History ==
According to many scholars, the name and origin of the town are traced back to the period of Arab rule. According to Ibn al-Athir (The Complete History, VII.370.5–7), in AH 268 (881/82 CE), the Aghlabid commander Abu Thawr was defeated by the Byzantines (probably commanded by the strategos Mosilikes) and his was army annihilated, with only seven men surviving. The locality was later named in Arabic Qalʿat Abī Ṯawr ("Castle of Abu Thawr"), which is the origin of the modern name. Others instead maintain that the name derives from the Arabic word "qal'at" (fortress) and the Sicilian "vuturu" (vulture) meaning of "fortress of vultures." The town existed under Byzantine rule pre Arab conquest as Aziz Ahmad in "A Islamic History of Sicily" ( edinburgh university press 1975) states that in 852 Abbas raided Caltavuturo in the northern part of the Island and took many prisoners who were sold as slaves,

The town was the site of the so-called Caltavuturo massacre on 20 January 1893, when local authorities killed 13 and wounded 21 peasants that had occupied communal land that they claimed was theirs.
