= Amilcare Cipriani =

Italian anarchist (1844–1918)

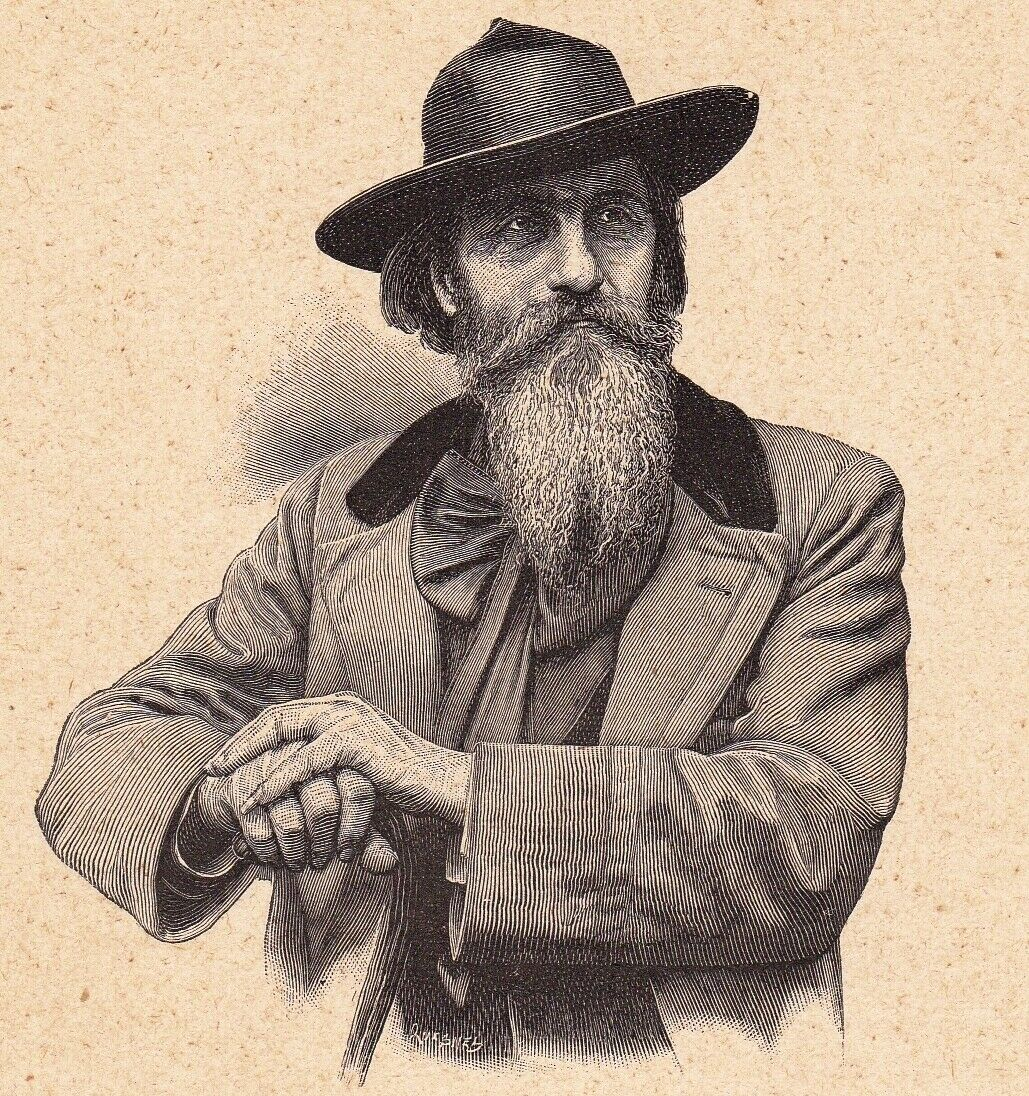
- Born: 18 October 1844; Anzio, Papal States
- Died: 30 April 1918 (aged 73); Paris, French Third Republic

Amilcare Cipriani (18 October 1844 in Anzio – 30 April 1918 in Paris) was an Italian socialist, anarchist and patriot.

== Biography ==
Cipriani was born in Anzio in a family that was originally from Rimini. In June 1859, at the age of 15, he fought with Giuseppe Garibaldi alongside Piedmontese troops at the Battle of Solferino during the Second Italian War of Independence. In 1860, he deserted to join Garibaldi's Expedition of the Thousand in Sicily; it conquered the Kingdom of the Two Sicilies, which was then ruled by the Bourbons.

Reinserted in the ranks of the regular army after an amnesty, he defected again to rejoin Garibaldi in the 1862 expedition to Rome with the intent of liberating the city and annexing it to the Kingdom of Italy. However, the Royal Italian Army defeated Garibaldi's army of volunteers at the Battle of Aspromonte (29 August 1862). Garibaldi was wounded and taken prisoner. Cipriani escaped capture but was forced to flee abroad and found refuge in Greece.

Cipriani participated in a demonstration leading to the expulsion of Otto of Greece in 1862. He joined the First International on 28 September 1864. He was introduced to Karl Marx and Friedrich Engels, and was asked to act as the Italian representative of the meeting.

He participated in the Third Italian War of Independence in 1866 and, afterwards, immediately went to Crete to take part in the Great Cretan Revolution alongside the Greeks. There, he befriended Goustave Flourens, who was also taking part in the revolt. Cipriani joined the group of Emmanouil Zymvrakakis at Omalos after the Battle of Agia Roumeli in January 1867.

Cipriani participated in the defence of the Paris Commune in 1871 for which he was condemned to death but was instead exiled to the French penal colony of New Caledonia along with 7,000 others.

After the 1879 amnesty, Cipriani returned to France in 1880 but was quickly expelled. Arrested in Italy in January 1881 for "conspiracies", he served 7 years of a 20-year sentence before a popular campaign secured his release in 1888. At the Zürich Congress of the Second International in 1893, Cipriani resigned his mandate in solidarity with Rosa Luxemburg and the anarchists who were excluded from the proceedings.

In 1897, he volunteered in the Garibaldi Legion and went with Garibaldi's son, Ricciotti Garibaldi, and the former leaders of the Fasci Siciliani, Nicola Barbato and Giuseppe De Felice Giuffrida, to Greece to fight during the Greco-Turkish War and sustained wounds before being re-imprisoned in Italy for a further three years on 30 July 1898.

He was elected as a deputy to the Chamber of Deputies and subsequently re-elected eight times but never claimed his seat because he refused to swear an oath of allegiance to the King. In 1891, he was among the delegates to the Capolago Congress in Switzerland that established the short-lived Socialist Revolutionary Anarchist Party. He supported Peter Kropotkin's view of First World War.

He wrote for Le Plébéien and other anarchist periodicals and died in a Paris hospital on 30 April 1918, at the age of 73. His writings were banned as subversive literature in Italy in 1911.

The parents of the future Fascist Italian dictator Benito Mussolini (1883–1945) made one of their son's middle names "Amilcare" in honour of Cipriani, along with his other middle name honoring fellow Italian socialist Andrea Costa.

== See also ==
- Anarchism and nationalism
