= Giuseppe De Felice Giuffrida =

Italian politician (1859–1920)

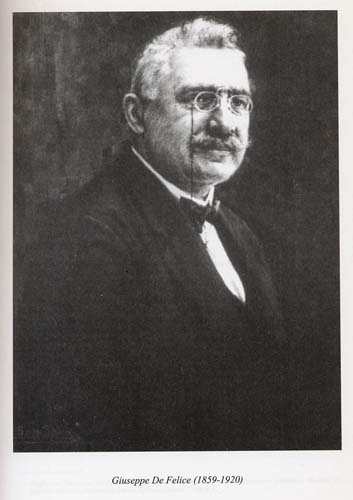
- Born: 11 April 1859; Catania, Two Sicilies
- Died: 19 July 1920 (aged 61); Aci Castello, Italy
- Occupations: Socialist politician and journalist
- Known for: Leader of the Fasci Siciliani; Mayor of Catania

Giuseppe De Felice Giuffrida (11 April 1859 in Catania – 19 July 1920 in Aci Castello) was an Italian socialist politician and journalist from Sicily. He is considered to be one of the founders of the Fasci Siciliani (Sicilian Leagues), a popular movement of democratic and socialist inspiration. As the first socialist mayor of Catania in Sicily, from 1902 until 1914, he became the protagonist of a kind of municipal socialism.

== Early life ==
Born in a humble family in Catania, he spent his childhood years in a children’s home. His father had been killed in 1868 by the Carabinieri during a robbery, while his mother, according to a report by the authorities, "lived in immorality." Released from the home, he found employment as an archivist clerk in the prefecture in 1878.

His combative temperament was played out in journalism. A little over twenty years, in 1880, he founded the political weekly Lo staffile (The Whip), whose very title reflected the polemic nature of its contents. Due to his continuous attacks against local authorities, he soon had to leave his job at the prefecture. To feed the family and attend school, he practised many trades: wine seller, salesman of sewing machines, a printer, and even playing the tuba in a band. He graduated in Law, passed the examinations of an attorney, but did not practice the legal profession ever.

A few years later, he was involved with the weekly L'unione (The Union), which had emerged as the organ of the Republican Club, and became the workers' organ of Catania. De Felice was very active in organizing workers. In 1890, he convened the first congress of workers' associations in Sicily, with the adhesion of a couple of hundred associations. However, the congress was prohibited by the police superintendent of Catania, on the orders of Prime Minister Francesco Crispi.

He married at the age of seventeen and had four daughters in a few years. But his turbulent life led his wife, Giuseppa De Simone, to break off the relationship. After the break-up, De Felice would have a busy, but rather inordinate, love life.

== Fasci Siciliani ==
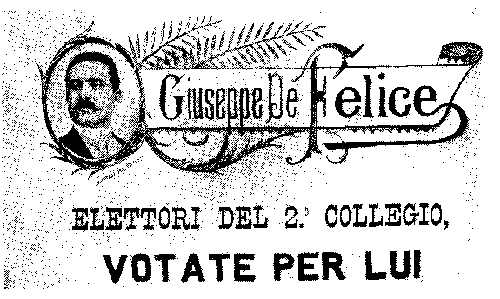
Election leaflet for De Felice Giuffrida (1892)

On 1 May 1891, he founded the first Fascio dei lavoratori (Workers League) in his hometown Catania. The Fascio’s rapid success as a combination of trade union and mutual benefit society led to the foundation of similar leagues in Palermo and many other Sicilian towns in the next two years. Meanwhile, in November 1892, he was elected a Member of the Italian Chamber of Deputies, the only Sicilian among the socialist deputies.

De Felice was actively engaged in setting up Fasci in the interior of Sicily and travelled extensively over the island. He was often accompanied by his daughter Marietta De Felice Giuffrida. Only 14 years old, she was, according to the journalist Adolfo Rossi who met her, "extraordinarily animated by the spirit of socialism, who spoke to the people with a fervour of a missionary, and because of her sex and age, she commanded the fascination of the masses."

Although a socialist by inspiration, he remained independent of the official party. At the Congress of the Fasci in Palermo on 21–22 May 1893 De Felice successfully represented the tendency for autonomy within the movement, and was elected a member of the new Central Committee. De Felice, counting on the anarchists, urged immediate insurrection if the government tried to dissolve the Fasci, the majority recognised the futility of barricades and favoured calm and prudence.

== Repression and trial ==
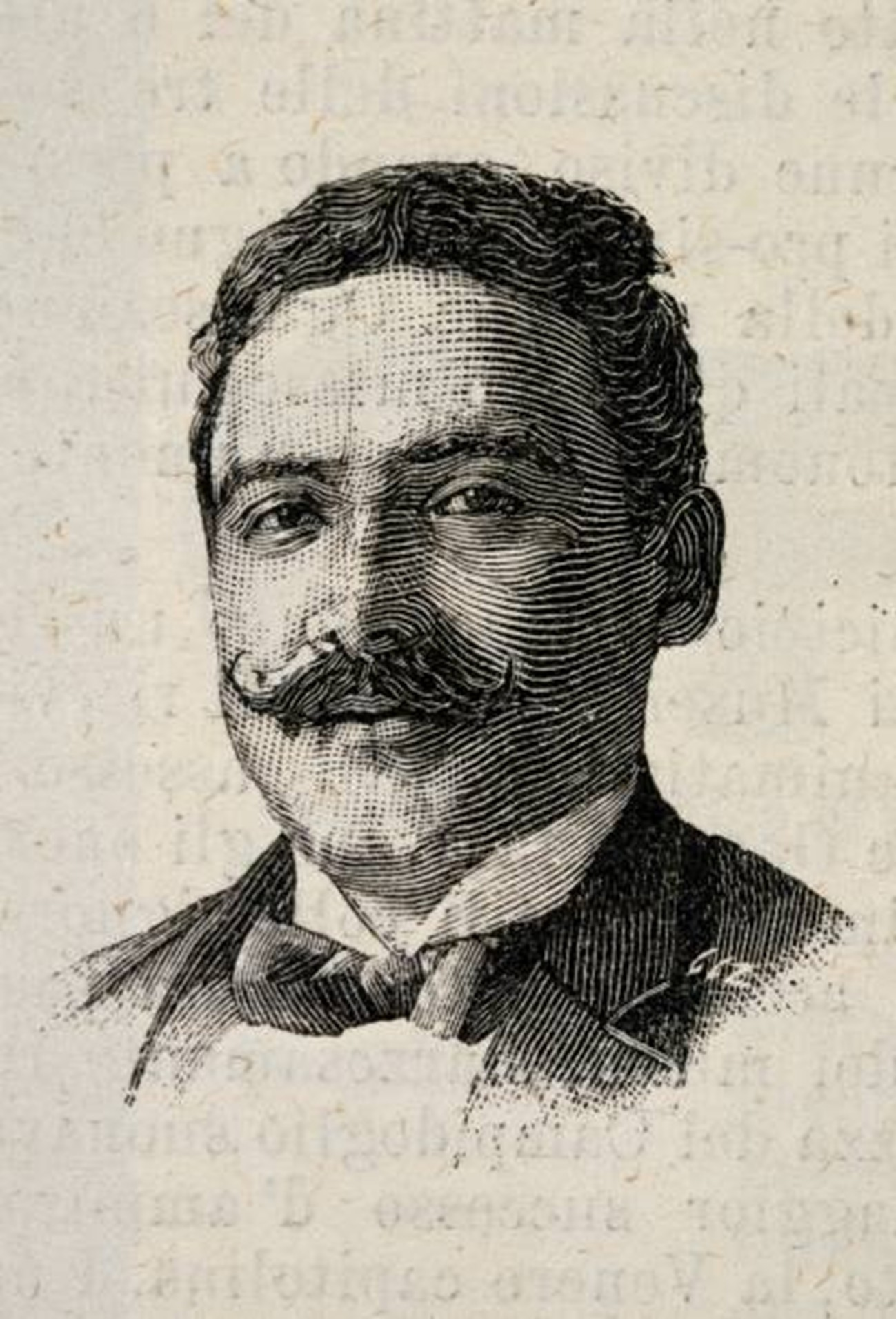
Giuseppe De Felice-Giuffrida in 1894

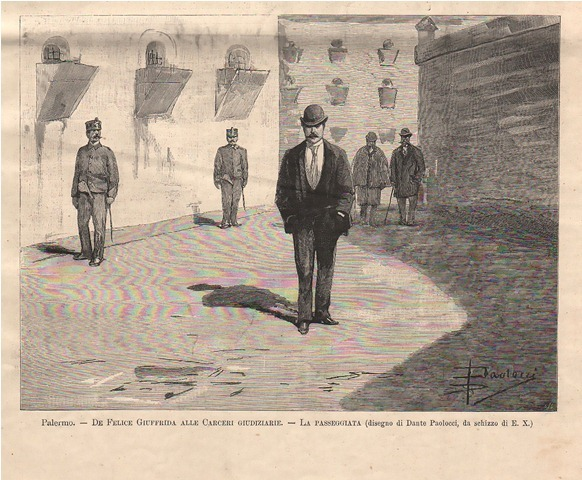
De Felice Giuffrida in prison in Palermo

In 1893 the upheaval of the Fasci turned into strikes which were violently repressed in January 1894, after Francesco Crispi had taken over government from Giovanni Giolitti. After the declaration of a state of siege on Sicily, De Felice Giuffrida left from Rome for Catania. "The Fasci are perfectly organized, and will resist the military. My place is there among my people. I do not fear the force of arms. … Of course Crispi will imprison me, but it will not help him. My arrest will only react against the Government," he declared. He was arrested after attending a meeting of the Revolutionary Committee on 4 January 1894. Although he initially wanted to resist the arrest, he was persuaded not to do so as resistance to arrest would have been punishable by death under the state of siege. His arrest was described in The New York Times as a "wise act", as De Felice's personal influence alone could have brought Catania to the verge of rebellion.

On 30 May 1894, he was sentenced to 18 years of prison at a trial in Palermo against the leaders of the Fasci. After two years, he was released in March 1896 as the result of a pardon recognizing the excessive brutality of the repression. After his release, De Felice, and other Fasci leaders Nicola Barbato and Rosario Garibaldi Bosco were met by a large crowd of supporters in Rome, who released the horses from their carriage and dragged them to the hotel, cheering for socialism and denouncing Crispi. De Felice said that after he had left the prison, he was still more of a revolutionary than when he entered it.

== Re-elected ==
While he was still in prison, De Felice was re-elected twice in the Chamber of Deputies in May 1895 and September 1895. He was elected in protest against the repression of the Fasci Siciliani, but could not be sworn in. After his release in March 1896 he was enthusiastically greeted by a large crowd at the railway station in Catania. He was carried to a carriage, and after he had entered, the horses were unharnessed by the crowd in a sign of respect until he reached a hotel.

Shortly thereafter, in early 1897, he volunteered to fight against the Turks in the thirty-day Turkish-Greek war in the irregular legion of Giuseppe Garibaldi's son, Ricciotti Garibaldi, for the liberation of Crete. Former Fasci-leader and fellow defendant in the 1894 Palermo trial Nicola Barbato and the anarchist Amilcare Cipriani also volunteered.

Re-elected again in the general election of March 1897, he would remain in Parliament until his death in 1920. During the elections, his portrait was raised on many altars with burning candles, as before the Saints.

In 1899, De Felice was among the socialist parliamentarians who opposed the introduction of a coercive Public Safety bill, including measures seriously restricting the freedom of the press and assembly, as well as introducing criminal offences for various forms of political opposition. The decree by the government of Luigi Pelloux was the result of conceived revolutionary activity in Italy and the Bava Beccaris massacre. The decrees are obstructed by filibustering. When, in June, the president of the Chamber of Deputies arbitrarily truncated the debate and put the decrees to the vote, De Felice, along with Leonida Bissolati and Camillo Prampolini, overthrew the voting box. As a result of the uproar, the Parliament was closed down for three months and criminal proceedings were started against the three rioters. De Felice escaped arrest and remained abroad until he was acquitted in October 1899.

He also continued to work as a journalist with important national newspapers. As such, he was sent to Paris in 1899 for the Dreyfus trial by Il Secolo XIX and the socialist newspaper Avanti!, while evading arrest for his actions in Parliament. In 1906, he assumed the direction of the Corriere di Catania.

== Mayor of Catania ==
In 1902, he was elected as the first left-wing mayor of Catania and became the protagonist of a kind of municipal socialism until 1914. He municipalized the bread ovens and instigated many public works. On 10 August 1914, he was elected President of the Province of Catania, and remained there until his death in 1920.

De Felice was among those who left the Italian Socialist Party in 1912, supporting the Italian invasion of Libya in contrast to the official party position. He saw the new land as essential to relieving southern Italy and was convinced that North Africa was a natural outlet for the surplus population. Consequently, He joined the Italian Reformist Socialist Party of Ivanoe Bonomi and Leonida Bissolati. He quickly lost his enthusiasm for Tripoli, however. After visiting Libya as a war correspondent, he condemned Italian atrocities against Arab rebels and accused the government of allowing the Italian colony to be exploited by large companies, led by the Bank of Rome. He supported Italy's participation in World War I on the side of the Triple Entente and volunteered to fight at the front.

== Death and legacy ==
He died on 1 July 1920. The news of his death came unexpectedly and caused a wave of popular mourning in Catania. The corpse of the politician, loved by the people who came to call "u nostru patri" (Sicilian for: "Our father"), was transported by tram and followed by thousands of people; many others mourned his death. When he died he had only six lire. The funeral procession is estimated to have been attended by about two hundred thousand people; the whole of Catania then.

De Felice was a controversial and charismatic leader and a gifted speaker. Some considered him to be a populist demagogue.

== Publications ==
- Popolazione e Socialismo. Palermo, Biondo, 1896.
- Evoluzione storica della Proprietà e il Socialismo in Sicilia
- Maffia e delinquenza in Sicilia. Milan, 1900.
- La questione sociale in Sicilia. Rome, 1901.
