= Napoleone Colajanni =

Italian writer, journalist, criminologist, and politician (1847–1921)

Member of the Chamber of Deputies
- In office 10 December 1890 – 2 September 1921
- Constituency: Caltanissetta

Personal details
- Born: 27 April 1847 Castrogiovanni, Kingdom of the Two Sicilies
- Died: 2 September 1921 (aged 74) Castrogiovanni, Kingdom of Italy
- Party: Historical Far Left; Italian Republican Party
- Occupation: Writer, journalist, criminologist, socialist, republican, politician

Napoleone Colajanni (27 April 1847 – 2 September 1921) was an Italian writer, journalist, criminologist, socialist, and politician. In the 1880s, he abandoned republicanism for socialism, and became Italy's leading theoretical writer on the issue for a time. He has been called the "father of Sicilian socialism". Due to the Italian Socialist Party's discourse of Marxist class struggle, he reverted in 1894 to his original republicanism and joined the Italian Republican Party. Colajanni was an ardent critic of the Lombrosian school in criminology. In 1890, he was elected in the national Chamber of Deputies and was re-elected in all subsequent parliaments until his death in September 1921.

== Early life and family ==
Colajanni was born in Castrogiovanni (now Enna) in Sicily, then part of the Kingdom of the Two Sicilies, in a family of intense patriotic feelings. His father Luigi Colajanni and mother Concetta Falautano were small entrepreneurs in the sulfur industry.

== Redshirts ==
At a young age, Colajanni was inspired by Giuseppe Garibaldi and attempted to join the Redshirts in the Expedition of the Thousand for the unification of Italy in 1860, escaping to Palermo at the age of 13, but without success. A relative recognised the young boy and brought him back home. In 1862, two years later, when Garibaldi passed by Castrogiovanni in his expedition against Rome, Colajanni joined the troops. He reached the Battle of Aspromonte, where he was captured by government troops and deported to the island of Palmaria. Liberated after an amnesty, he returned to Sicily but volunteered again with Garibaldi's troops in the Third Italian War of Independence in 1866 and participated in the Battle of Bezzecca in Trentino, northern Italy, in July 1866.

After the war, Colajanni finished school and started to study medicine in Genoa. He made contact with the republicans of Giuseppe Mazzini and started to write for Il Dovere (The Duty). In 1867, he returned to Castrogiovanni due to the death of his father but immediately left to join Garibaldi again in his new campaign to capture Rome. He arrived too late when the Battle of Mentana, in which Garibaldi was defeated by Papal troops and a French auxiliary force, had already ended.

Colajanni took up his study in medicine, this time in Naples. On 26 February 1869, he was arrested for taking part in a republican conspiracy. He remained in prison until 17 November, when an amnesty was declared because of the birth of the future king of Italy, Victor Emmanuel III.

== Positivist and evolutionary socialism ==
After graduating in Medicine in 1871, Colajanni enrolled as a physician on a ship to South America before returning to Italy to devote himself to the study of sociology and continue his political activities. He returned to his home town, Castrogiovanni, where he practiced medicine and managed some sulfur mines owned by his mother.

In 1875, Colajanni was among the participants at the Republican Congress in Rome to revive the movement. He started to collaborate with the magazine La rivista repubblicana (Republican Magazine) of Arcangelo Ghisleri, which put him in contact with the exponents of republicanism and socialism in Milan. Through these democratic groups, Colajanni came into contact with the positivist theories, and personalities like Filippo Turati and Leonida Bissolati. Colajanni became one of the protagonists of the Italian positivist and evolutionary socialism, inspired by Darwinian evolution.

With his book Il socialismo (Socialism) published in 1884 in Catania, Colajanni became one of the first theoreticians of the Italian workers movement. His socialism was not based on the scientific Marxist approach but was closer to the ideology of Mazzini, one of the fathers of Italian unification, with some influence of French utopian thinkers such as Georges Sorel, and in terms of practical politics resulted in a kind of radical-democratic reformism.

In 1892, Colajanni was appointed Professor of Statistics at the University of Palermo. Since 1896, he directed the Rivista popolare (Popular Magazine), by means of which he strove to improve the moral and intellectual standard of the masses and combated all forms of intolerance and hypocrisy.

== Criminal sociology ==
Colajanni in his study

Colajanni published many books and essays on social and political problems, and exposed the unscientific theories of Cesare Lombroso and his Scuola positiva (Positive School), as well as Enrico Ferri on criminology. Colajanni was particularly critical of Lombroso's biological determinism, in particular the alleged inferiority of Southern Italians, and he put a much greater emphasis on social conditions as a cause of offending. Lombroso and his disciples remained dominant in Italy.

Colajanni was the first to publish a book with criminal sociology in the title. He belonged to the Terza scuola (Third School) and argued that in order to curtail the level of crime in a society there should be a certain level of security with regard to sustainable living conditions, economic stability, and a more equal welfare distribution.

After the publication of his two-volume study La sociologia criminale (Criminal Sociology) in 1889, in which he emphasised the social factors on criminal behaviour, Colajanni was virulently attacked by Lombroso and his disciples. The work received a moderately positive response from the scientific community both in Italy and abroad. Lombroso did not allow any criticism by rival scientists and his alleged scientific supremacy. He unleashed a smear campaign and scientific crusade against Colajanni while blocking access to academic journals to prevent Colajanni's replies.

In his essay Per la razza maledetta (For the Cursed Race, published in 1898), Colajanni ridiculed the history of anthropometry and its related categories of the Lombrosian school and deconstructed their ethnic stereotypes. He argued that the high rates of criminality in Southern Italy, which were seen as evidence of alleged Southern racial inferiority, could simply be explained by social conditions and levels of education. He opposed the notion of racism and racial superiority as an ideological tool to legitimise dominance and exploitation, which would lead to the destruction of other races instead of its alleged progressive transformation. In a later work, Latini e anglo-sassoni: Razze superiori e razze inferiori (Latins and Anglo-Saxons: Inferior and Superior races, published in 1903), he expanded his critique on the concept of superior and inferior civilisations to the Anglo-Saxon nations.

== Political activities ==
In 1879, Colajanni had been appointed as a municipal councillor in Castrogiovanni. In 1882, he was a candidate in the general election in the constituency of Caltanissetta. While he was not elected, he obtained a significant following. Although poor health forced him to stay at Castrogiovanni, he continued to write political articles in periodicals of democratic orientation.

In 1890, Colajanni was elected in the Kingdom of Italy's Chamber of Deputies in the district of Caltanissetta for the first time. He was re-elected in all subsequent Italian Parliaments until his death in September 1921. In Parliament, he sat as a republican and showed socialist tendencies, becoming one of the de facto leaders of the republicans in Parliament. He sponsored initiatives like the parliamentary inquiry on colonial adventure in Italian Eritrea (1891) and the Banca Romana scandal (1892).

Colajanni argued against the incipient colonial policy of the moderate Historical Left, and anti-colonialism was one of his favourite themes. In his book Politica coloniale (Colonial Policy), written in 1891, Colajanni rejected the colonial adventure in Eritrea. According to Colajanni, the poor agricultural conditions made the country inappropriate for impoverished Southern Italian populace and completely inadequate to serve as a market for the emerging Italian industry.

Colajanni played an important role in the Banca Romana scandal. A suppressed report about the sorry financial state of the bank was leaked to Colajanni, who divulged its contents to parliament. On 20 December 1892, Colajanni read out long extracts in Parliament and the then Historical Left prime minister Giovanni Giolitti was forced to appoint an expert commission to investigate the bank. The resulting inquiry caused the fall of the government of Giolitti in November 1893.

== Fasci Siciliani ==
Although he was never a member of the Italian Socialist Party (PSI), Colajanni was Sicily's leading political radical. He supported the Fasci Siciliani, a popular movement of democratic and socialist inspiration, which arose in Sicily in the years between 1891 and 1893. The demands of the movement were fair land rents, higher wages, lower local taxes, and distribution of misappropriated common land. He took the Fasci under his political protection, defending them in parliament and in the press.

Francesco Crispi, who took over after the fall of Giolitti in December 1893, promised important measures of land reform for the near future. Crispi was not blind to the misery and the need for social reform. Before 1891, he had been the patron of the Sicilian working-class and many of their associations had been named after him. Crispi's good intentions were soon drowned in the clamour for strong measures. In the three weeks of uncertainty before the government was formed, the rapid spread of violence drove many local authorities to disregard Giolitti's ban on the use of firearms. In December 1893, many peasants lost their lives in clashes with the police and army.

In order to stem the turmoil, Crispi offered Colajanni the Ministry of Agriculture, which he refused. When riots on the island got out of hand, Crispi asked Colajanni to undertake a mission of appeasement on Sicily. On 3 January 1894, only four days after Crispi had promised Colajanni there would be no state of siege, martial law was declared in the island. General Roberto Morra di Lavriano e della Montà was dispatched with 40,000 troops to restore order. Colajanni condemned the Fasci leaders for lacking to keep the peace. After conferring with Morra, he issued a manifesto in which he urged the people to restore order. He argued that the government was engaged in bettering the working conditions and deserved their confidence, at least for a while. He called fools and traitors those breaking the peace.

Within a few days of the declaration of martial law and the violent suppression of the Fasci, Colajanni broke with Crispi and wrote the book Gli avvenimenti di Sicilia e le loro cause (The Events in Sicily and Their Causes) on the events in Sicily, which put the main blame on Crispi. The disorders were not the product of a revolutionary plot, but Crispi chose to believe otherwise. On the basis of dubious documents and reports, Crispi alleged that there was an organised conspiracy to separate Sicily from Italy, that the leaders of the Fasci conspired with the clerics and were financed by French gold, and war and invasion were looming.

Disillusioned by the spread of violence in Sicily, to which he believed the PSI's discourse of class struggle had contributed, Colajanni reverted in 1894 to his original republicanism. On 12 April 1895, he took part in the founding congress of the Italian Republican Party (PRI).

== Opposition to the Mafia ==
A recurring theme of Colajanni's political engagement was the struggle to overcome the economic contrast between North and South of Italy, through a reform of society but also of the state through federalism. His contribution the socio-political definition of the Southern Question was substantial, in particular with the volumes Settentrionali e meridionali (Northern and Southern, published in 1898) and Nel regno della mafia (In the Realm of the Mafia, published in 1900).

Colajanni identified the root of the backwardness of the region in power groups of landowners of the rural estates and the Sicilian Mafia, which were closely connected to each other and in a close relationship with public administration on the island. This connection was well established had become normal practice from 1876 onwards. The only hope to change the situation lay in an autonomist-federalist reform of the state.

In 1900, Colajanni wrote a j'accuse directed at the magistracy, the police, and the government in relation to the trial about the 1893 murder of Emanuele Notarbartolo, the ex-mayor of Palermo and ex-governor of the Bank of Sicily. Notarbartolo had been killed on the instruction of Raffaele Palizzolo, a member of Parliament and a director of the Bank of Sicily, in revenge for exposing a swindle using the bank's money. Palizzolo was allegedly involved with the Mafia.

Colajanni wrote that the Italian government did everything to consolidate the Mafia and render it omnipotent. In Nel regno della mafia, he wrote: "To fight and destroy the reign of the Mafia, it is necessary that the Italian government ceases to be the king of the Mafia." He said that the government needed to clean up Sicily and institute a fair and practical administration.

== Views of Marxism and Bolshevism ==
Colajanni continued to reject the ideological underpinnings of orthodox Marxism, which he considered to be a contradiction to democracy. He remained a social-Darwinist throughout his life, convinced that socialism would be a product of a natural process of evolution and social selection.

Colajanni did not consider himself a materialist, as the social question was not only an economic issue but also an ethical one. He rejected the concept of class struggle. He did not deny that there was a struggle, but he saw it as the first stage of evolution, which was not be encouraged, but passed in favour of a greater spread of altruism. A position that proved irreconcilable with Marxism, which led him to adhere to the newborn PRI. He also opposed revolutionary syndicalism and severely criticized the 1904 Italian general strike.

Colajanni opposed the Italian invasion of Libya in 1912. Despite his anti-militarist ideas, he became an ardent supporter of the left-interventionist camp on the side of the Triple Entente at the outbreak of the First World War. He launched a vigorous campaign against Avanti!, the organ of the PSI, when Benito Mussolini was removed as chief editor, and openly criticized the PSI for what he considered Bolshevik sympathies.

Colajanni strongly opposed the Italian Communist Party that had left the PSI in January 1921, and felt certain sympathy for Italian fascism in its initial phase. Like many other intellectuals and politicians of all persuasions, he saw fascism as an extreme defence against the dangers of Bolshevism but condemned its recourse to violence. In August 1921, he applauded the agreement between socialists and fascists to put an end to the civil war. His death on 2 September 1921 saved him from a potentially embarrassing adhesion of fascism.

== Main books ==
- Il socialismo e sociologia criminale (Catania: Tropea, 1884).
- La sociologia criminale (Catania: Tropea, 1889).
- Gli avvenimenti di Sicilia e le loro cause (Palermo: Remo Sandron, 1895).
- Settentrionali e meridionali: Agli Italiani del Mezzogiorno (Milan/Palermo/Rome: Sandron/Rivista popolare, 1898).
- Nel regno della mafia, dai Borboni ai Sabaudi. (Palermo: Remo Sandron, 1900).
- Latini e anglo-sassoni: Razze superiori e razze inferiori (Rome: Rivista Popolare, 1903).

== Bibliography ==
- Colajanni, Napoleone; Donativi, Marcello (1900/2009). Nel regno della mafia. Brindisi: Edizioni Trabant. ISBN 88-96576-06-7.
- Emsley, Clive (2007). Crime, Police, and Penal Policy: European Experiences 1750–1940. Oxford: Oxford University Press. ISBN 0-19-920285-0.
- Fentress, James (2000). Rebels & Mafiosi: Death in a Sicilian Landscape. New York: Cornell University Press. ISBN 0-8014-3539-0.
- Gregor, Anthony James (1979). Young Mussolini and the Intellectual Origins of Fascism. Berkeley: University of California Press. ISBN 0-520-03799-5.
- Hiller, Jonathan R. (2009). "Bodies that Tell": Physiognomy, Criminology, Race and Gender in Late Nineteenth- and Early Twentieth-Century Italian Literature and Opera. Dissertation at the University of California, Los Angeles.
- Hurwitz, Stephan; Christiansen, Karl O. (1983). Criminology. Sydney: George Allen & Unwin. ISBN 0-04-364012-5.
- Huysseune, Michel (2006). Modernity and Secession: The Social Sciences and the Political Discourse of the Lega Nord in Italy. New York/Oxford: Berghahn Books. ISBN 1-84545-061-2.
- Seton-Watson, Christopher (1967). Italy from Liberalism to Fascism, 1870–1925. New York: Taylor & Francis. ISBN 0-416-18940-7.
- Van Swaaningen, René (1997). Critical Criminology: Visions from Europe. London: SAGE Publications. ISBN 978-0-7619-5144-5.
