= Pasquale Scimeca =

Italian film director and producer (born 1956)

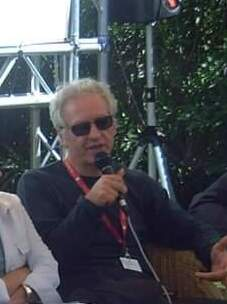
- Born: 1 February 1956; Aliminusa
- Occupation: Film director
- Known for: Il giorno di San Sebastiano

Pasquale Scimeca is an Italian film director and screenwriter.

== Filmography ==
- Il giorno di San Sebastiano (Saint Sebastian's Day) (1993)
- Placido Rizzotto (2000)
- Gli indesiderabili (2003)
- Il cavaliere sole (2008)
- Malavoglia (2010)
- Biagio (2014)
