= Nicola Barbato =

Italian politician (1856–1923)

- Drawing of Nicola Barbato

Member of Chamber of Deputies
- In office 1 December 1919 – 7 April 1921
- Constituency: Bari
- In office 16 June 1900 – 18 October 1904
- Constituency: Corato
- In office 10 June 1895 – 2 March 1897
- Constituency: Cesena

Personal details
- Born: 5 October 1856 Piana dei Greci, Kingdom of the Two Sicilies
- Died: 23 May 1923 (aged 66) Milan, Italy
- Party: Italian Socialist Party
- Occupation: Medical doctor and politician
- Known for: Prominent socialist leader of the Fasci Siciliani

Nicola Barbato (5 October 1856 – 23 May 1923) was a Sicilian medical doctor, socialist, and politician. He was one of the national leaders of the Fasci Siciliani dei Lavoratori (Sicilian Leagues) a popular movement of democratic and socialist inspiration in 1891–1894, and perhaps might have been the ablest among them according to the journalist Adolfo Rossi and Marxist historian Eric Hobsbawm.

== Early life ==
Barbato grew up in Piana dei Greci (now Piana degli Albanesi), a poor farming village in the Palermo hinterland marked by vast landed estates, exploitative tenancy arrangements and widespread poverty. After his father's death forced him to interrupt his studies to support his family, he later resumed them at the University of Palermo, where he embraced the then-fashionable evolutionary doctrines. He graduated in medicine and joined the socialist movement around 1878 and in the then prevailing positivist climate he devoted himself to study psychiatry. His work on the psychology of paranoia in the journal of the mental hospital of Palermo in 1890, was judged positively by Cesare Lombroso and Enrico Morselli.

He also was active politically. Together with other young intellectuals from Palermo, he contributed to L'isola (The Island) (Palermo, 1891–92), the avant-garde republican daily newspaper edited by Napoleone Colajanni. Back in Piana, he witnessed the intense misery on the countryside as a medical officer. Although descendant from Arbëreshë, he rejected the Albanian cause, which "was favoured by the moderates and clerics", who actively sought to discourage churchgoers from joining the Fasci Siciliani.

== Fasci Siciliani ==
Barbato was the classic country doctor who, by treating poor patients free of charge, had earned admiration and recognition, as well as unlimited trust. In March 1893, he founded and became the leader of the Fasci dei lavoratori (Workers League) of Piana dei Greci. The adult population joined it en masse: only twenty-four days after its foundation it already had 1,500 members. The Fascio of Piana was one of the more numerous and better organized; eventually there were more than 2,800 members out of 9,000 inhabitants, and included over a thousand women. Barbato was the animator of the Fascio and, according to contemporary witnesses, he "became the real boss (il vero padrone) of the district", challenging the traditional land-owning elite. The female Fascio delle lavoratrici had their own meeting hall where they held their own meetings; they carried their own banner when participated in protest marches.

Barbato was one of the most prominent leaders of the Fasci Siciliani and was known as "the workers' apostle", and was instrumental in setting up the Fasci in the neighbouring towns of San Giuseppe Jato, San Cipirello, Partinico, Borgetto and Belmonte Mezzagno. Other leaders included Rosario Garibaldi Bosco in Palermo, Giuseppe De Felice Giuffrida in Catania, and Bernardino Verro in Corleone. Famous are his Labour Day speeches on 1 May at Portella della Ginestra, where he used to speak to the crowd from a big rock that was later called the "stone of Barbato." The first meeting took place in 1893 and the place became a historic meeting place of local peasantry from San Giuseppe Jato and San Cipirello. The tradition was interrupted during the fascist period and resumed after the fall of the Fascist regime. In 1947, Portella della Ginestra was the scene of a massacre that killed 11 people and wounded 33, perpetuated by the bandit Salvatore Giuliano.

The Pianese fascio was "among the most dangerous because of its propagandistic activity, its revolutionary proposals and the influence it exerts over the other fasci," according to Giuseppe Sensales, Prime Minister Giovanni Giolitti’s Director of Public Security. It was well organised and disciplined; there were no significant riots as often happened with many fasci in other towns, despite some murders of leading Fascio members by local landlords. In the midst of a general strike, Barbato and 10 others were arrested on 12 May 1893, for inciting "hatred between classes" and criminal conspiracy. This move backfired, instead of weakening the movement, it strengthened it: the strike continued, reinvigorated. At that moment of strength, partial local elections were held to renew one-fifth of the councillors in office in each municipality in July. Barbato and the other Fascio candidates won a landslide victory. The institution that now held the most power in Piana was the Fascio. Having obtained bail in June, on 16 November 1893, the court of Palermo inflicted a suspended sentence of six months' imprisonment and a heavy fine for the first offense, but was acquitted for the second one.

== Second arrest and conviction ==
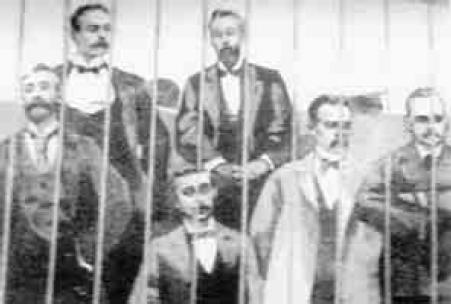
The leaders of the Fasci Siciliani in the courtroom cage at the trial in April 1894

Following the repression of the Fasci Siciliani by the government of Francesco Crispi, he was arrested in January 1894 and was brought to trial. In spite of an eloquent defence, which turned the Court into a political platform and thrilled every socialist in the country, he was sentenced to 12 years.

“In front of you,” he said to the judges, “we provided the documents and evidence of our innocence. My friends thought it necessary to support their defence legally; I will not do so. Not because I have no confidence in you, but it is the law that does not concern me. So I do not defend myself. You have to sentence: we are the elements that destroy your sacred institutions. You have to sentence: it is logical, human. I will always pay tribute to your loyalty. But we say to our friends outside: do not ask for pardon, do not ask for amnesty. Socialist civilization should not begin with an act of cowardice. We demand a condemnation, we do not ask for mercy. Martyrs are more useful to the holy cause than any propaganda. Condemn us!” His famous self-defence in the Court has entered the socialist historiography.

The heavy sentence aroused strong reactions in Italy and even in the United States. In Palermo a group of students went to the Teatro Bellini and asked the orchestra to perform the hymn of Garibaldi. And the theater applauded.

== Elected and amnesty ==
In the 1895 general elections, he was elected deputy with the Italian Socialist Party while he was still in prison. He was a candidate in protest against the repression of the Fasci Siciliani in many national electoral districts. His election was annulled by the Council of the Chamber. In the next elections in September 1895, he was elected again in two electoral colleges. He was assigned by lot to the district of Cesena, leaving the fifth district of Milan to Filippo Turati, the grand old man of the socialist, who was elected to the Italian Chamber of Deputies for the first time.

After nearly two years, on 16 March 1896, he was released as the result of a pardon recognizing the excessive brutality of the repression. After his release, Barbato and the other Fasci leaders Giuseppe De Felice Giuffrida and Rosario Garibaldi Bosco were met by a large crowd of supporters in Rome, who released the horses form their carriage and dragged them to the hotel, cheering for socialism and denouncing Crispi. When Barbato returned to his home town Piana dei Greci, he was greeted by 5,000 people, more than half the population. At that point he was probably the most popular socialist leader in Sicily.

== Prominent Socialist leader ==
In 1897, he volunteered to fight against the Turks in the thirty-day Turkish-Greek war in the irregular legion of Giuseppe Garibaldi's son, Ricciotti Garibaldi, for the liberation of Crete. Former Fasci-leader and fellow defendant in the 1894 Palermo trial Giuseppe De Felice Giuffrida and the anarchist Amilcare Cipriani also volunteered. Returning to Italy in 1898, he was again sentenced to a year imprisonment for subversive activity.

He attained national prominence in the Italian Socialist Party, was elected to Parliament in 1900 and was a member of the National Executive Board of the Party until 1902. In 1903, he came into conflict with the central organs of the Socialist Party, controlled by the intransigent current of Enrico Ferri, who spoke out against participation in bourgeois governments. In addition, there were a series of personal disagreements with the leaders of the socialist section and administrators of the town of Piana dei Greci.

He traveled through Europe on a propaganda tour among Italian emigrants, and in 1904 he left for the United States, where he remained until 1909, first in New York and then in Philadelphia. He was active in the Italian Socialist Federation and within the Italian communities on the East coast. He favoured the association of Italian socialists with the Industrial Workers of the World (IWW).

He returned to Sicily in 1909. In 1913 the Italian Socialist Party appointed Barbato as its candidate in the electoral district of Catania against his former ally of the Fasci Siciliani and fellow volunteer in the 1897 war in Greece, Giuseppe De Felice Giuffrida, who had joined the Italian Reformist Socialist Party supporting the Italian invasion of Libya. He lost, but voters also condemned the political attitude of the De Felice Giuffrida abstaining en masse.

== Return to Piana, exile and death ==
His political work among the peasants of his home town led to clashes with the Mafia boss of Piana, Ciccio Cuccia. The organizational successes of the post-fasci socialist movement, the persistence of the cooperatives —as an example of a non-exploitative economy — and gains in local elections in Piana, led to Mafia attacks on socialist organizers and peasants. In Piana some two dozen socialists were victims of political murders from 1904 to 1920.

Barbato was able to lead the socialists to victory in the municipale elections in Piana in June 1914, even after the murder of his cousin and right-hand man, Mariano Barbato, and the socialist militant Giorgio Pecoraro in May 1914. Barbato himself expected to be the next victim and Pianese socialists served as bodyguards. Nevertheless, after the killing of the Socialist leader of Corleone, Bernardino Verro, in November 1915, he was seriously threatened by the Mafia. The national leadership of the Socialist party ordered him to leave Piana dei Greci for Milan in January 1916. He was again elected to Parliament in 1919, and died in Milan on 23 May 1923.
