= Ferdinando Russo =

Italian journalist, poet and lyricist (1866–1927)

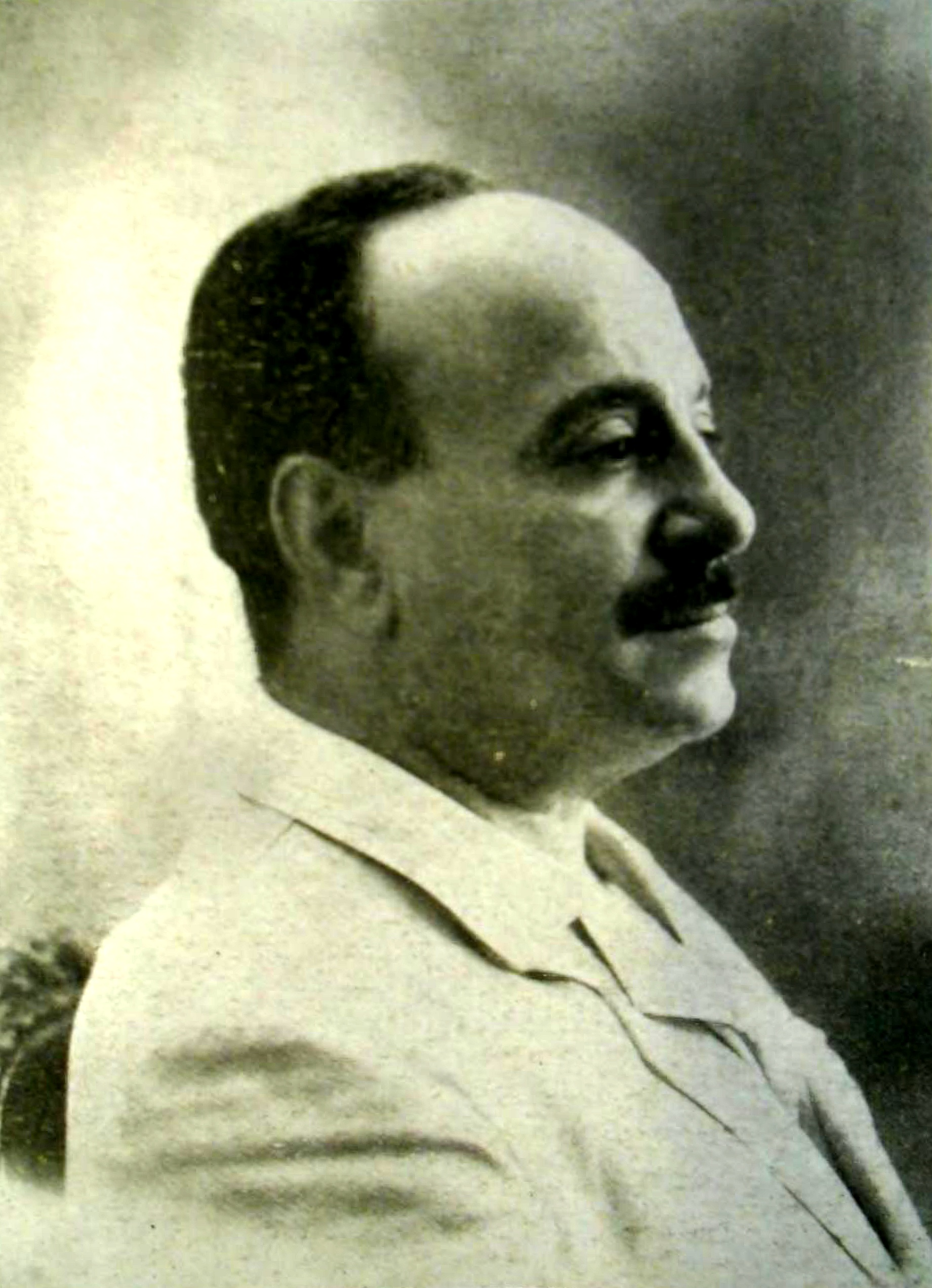
- Ferdinando Russo in 1913
- Born: 25 November 1866; Naples, Italy
- Died: 30 January 1927 (aged 60); Naples, Italy
- Occupations: Journalist, poet and composer of song lyrics

Ferdinando Russo (25 November 1866 – 30 January 1927) was a prominent Neapolitan journalist primarily remembered as a dialect poet and composer of song lyrics.

== Biography ==
Ferdinando Russo was born on 25 November 1866, in Naples, the second of seven children, from Gennaro Russo, an official at the consumer tax office, and from Cecilia De Blasio. He attended the Technical Institute reluctantly and frequented with great interest instead a republican club located in piazza Trinità Maggiore, participating in the many protest demonstrations. He was therefore arrested by the police in 1882. After leaving his studies, he worked as a proofreader for the Gazzetta di Napoli, taking an interest in poetry in the Neapolitan dialect, to which he then dedicated much of his life.

He worked as an employee at the Archaeological Museum of Naples and published the texts of Sunettiata (Naples 1887) with dialogues of commoners, prisoners, guappi, which he overheard in the streets of Naples. Also in 1887, he wrote one of his first (and most successful) songs in Neapolitan, Scètate (Svegliati - Wake up), with the music composed by Mario Pasquale Costa, one of the 250 songs he would write.

In the largest Neapolitan daily newspaper Il Mattino, he ran a column of worldly and literary events, raising endless controversies, criticizing the renewer of Neapolitan dialect poetry Salvatore Di Giacomo for errors or improprieties in the use of the Neapolitan language. At the newspaper he became close friends with Edoardo Scarfoglio, Matilde Serao, Gabriele D'Annunzio and Federigo Verdinois. A passionate and exuberant personality, he was expelled from Il Mattino for one of his many disputes. He had contacts with the Camorra and followed well known judicial cases, such as those of Ciccio Cappuccio and Gennaro Cuocolo. After having beaten up a Camorrista who was annoying his girlfriend, the then nineteen-year old Russo was approached by the guappo Teofilo Sperino. Later he also met Cappuccio, the head of the "honoured society".

He was the author of a small volume, La Camorra, about organized crime in Naples, serialized in five instalments in 1897 in Il Mattino. He wrote the poem "Canzone 'e Ciccio Cappuccio," immortalising the legendary Camorra chief Cappuccio when he died in 1892. His fame and knowledge of the slums and underworld of Naples was such that Emile Zola wanted him as an escort in his descent in the belly of the Neapolitan labyrinth in 1894.

The first novel of Russo, written as a feuilleton in 1907 and published by Treves (Memorie d’un ladro - Memoirs of a thief), was based on the costumes of the Camorra underworld. The same year he published Origini, usi, costumi e riti dell’Annorata soggietà (Origins, customs, traditions and rituals of the "Honoured Society") in collaboration with Ernesto Serao, which was a combination of an essay, journalistic investigation and historical reconstruction with portraits of famous Camorristi and popular sonnets on the subject.

In 1901 he married Elisa Rosa Pennazzi, a café-chantant singer. The marriage ended early due to the jealousy of his wife, who had him followed by a private investigator. Already suffering from diabetes, he died in Naples on January 30, 1927.
