= Ciccotti =

Ciccotti is an Italian surname. Notable people with the surname include:

- Claudia Ciccotti (born 1994), Italian footballer
- Ettore Ciccotti (1863–1939), Italian historian, lecturer, and politician
- Giovanni Ciccotti (born 1943), Italian physicist
