= Cuocolo Trial =

Criminal trial against members of the Camorra

Cuocolo Trial (1911-1912)
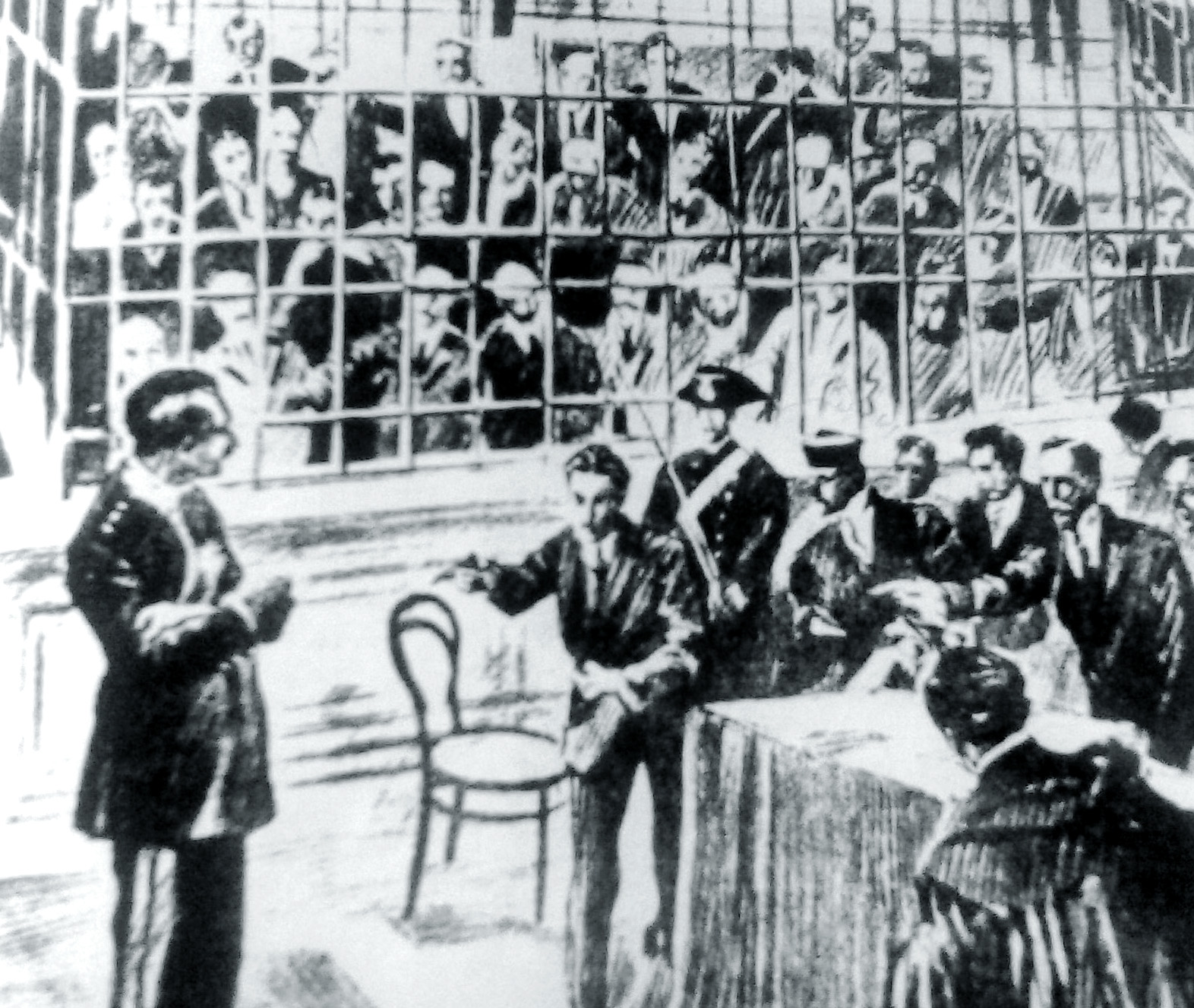
- Carlo Fabbroni (left) at the trial in Viterbo
- Court: Court of Assizes in Viterbo
- Decided: July 8, 1912; 114 years ago (verdict)
- Verdict: The 47 defendants of the Neapolitan Camorra were sentenced to a total of 354 years' imprisonment

The Cuocolo Trial was a trial against the Camorra, a Mafia-type organisation in the region of Campania and its capital Naples in Italy. The court hearing began in Viterbo on 11 March 1911 and the verdict was delivered on 8 July 1912. The trial was ostensibly to prosecute those charged with the murder of the Camorra boss Gennaro Cuocolo and his wife in 1906. The main investigator, Carabinieri Captain Carlo Fabbroni, transformed the trial into one against the Camorra as a whole, intending to use it to strike the final blow to the criminal organisation.

After 17 months, the proceedings ended with a guilty verdict on 8 July 1912 against the 47 defendants that included 27 leading Camorra associates. They were sentenced to a total of 354 years' imprisonment. Enrico Alfano, the main defendant and alleged head of the Camorra, was sentenced to 30 years. The often tumultuous and spectacular trial attracted a lot of attention of newspapers and the general public both in Italy as well as in the United States, including by Pathé's Gazette. In 1927, the main incriminating witness retracted his version of the facts, but Italy's dictatorial Prime Minister Benito Mussolini did not authorise the revision of the trial.

== The Cuocolo murder ==
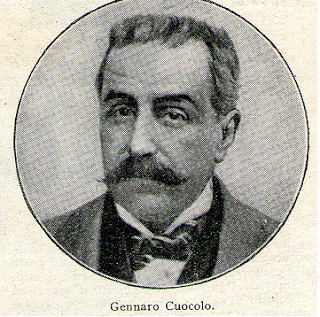
Gennaro Cuocolo

Gennaro Cuocolo and his wife, Maria Cutinelli, were murdered on 6 June 1906, suspected of being police informers, and opposing the Camorra leadership. Cuocolo was, in fact, a notorious burglar, although he descended from leather merchants; Cutinelli came from prostitution. He was murdered on the beach at Torre del Greco; she, a few hours later, in her new house in Via Nardones, between Via Toledo and the Quartieri Spagnoli in Naples. The motive was, almost certainly, a breach of the criminal code of the Camorra. Cuocolo had appropriated the share due to the thieves who had ended up in prison, who then took revenge.

The murder case would develop into one of the most complicated legal cases of the early twentieth century in Italy. The police moved quickly to arrest Alfano and his brother Ciro, Giovanni Rapi, and two members of the Camorra rank and file, Gennaro Jacovitti and Gennaro Ibello. They had been in a restaurant in Torre del Greco, in the vicinity of the spot where Cuocolo was murdered on the same day. However, the investigation did not produce reliable evidence and the suspects were released from jail 50 days later, not in the least thanks to the intervention of the priest Ciro Vitozzi, the "guardian angel" of the Camorra and Erricone's godfather.

The hypothesis that the double murder was Camorra-related did not convince the investigating judge and the judiciary was persuaded that the trail to follow was that of revenge, of a reprisal for matters of booty. On the basis of Vitozzi's declarations and the testimony of Giacomo Ascrittore, a regular police informer and member of the Camorra, the local police and judiciary of Naples identified Gaetano Amodeo and Tommaso De Angelis, two receivers and former collaborators of Cuocolo, as the real killers, because Cuocolo had refused to share the proceeds of a jewellery theft.

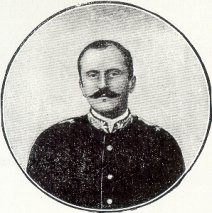
Carlo Fabbroni

Captain Carlo Fabbroni of the Carabinieri, the national gendarmerie of Italy, did not think so, and decided for an open confrontation with the local police. He accused the Naples police of inefficiency, corruption and collusion with the city’s underworld. Due to political pressure, the murder investigation was delegated to Fabbroni. Fabbroni and his right-hand man Marshal Erminio Capezzuti worked relentlessly on the incrimination of Alfano and his associates by interrogating and threatening a large number of criminals. The investigation gained new momentum in February 1907, when Gennaro Abbatemaggio, known as 'o Cucchieriello because of his work as a coachman, a young camorrista and police informer serving a jail sentence in Naples, testified that the decision to kill Cuocolo had been taken at a meeting at the restaurant chaired by Alfano.

From that moment on, everything contributed to reinforcing an accusatory picture not devoid of inconsistencies and gross errors. The main newspaper of Naples, Il Mattino, that sold 70,000 copies at the time, supported Fabbroni's line of investigation with dozens of articles signed in particular by the newspaper's influential editor Edoardo Scarfoglio and crime reporter Ernesto Serao. Indicted on 22 October 1907, the defendants faced a circumstantial trial on the basis of Abbatemaggio's testimony alone. The developments of the case and suspected police corruption were discussed in parliament several times. Meanwhile, after his release Alfano had moved to New York City, where he was arrested by the head of the Italian squad of the New York police, Joseph Petrosino. The arrest caused a sensation in Naples. Alfano was expelled and put behind bars in Naples.

== The Trial ==
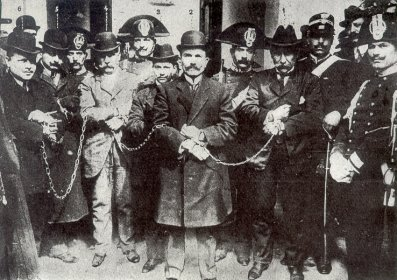
Alfano (in the middle) at the Cuocolo trial in Viterbo in 1911

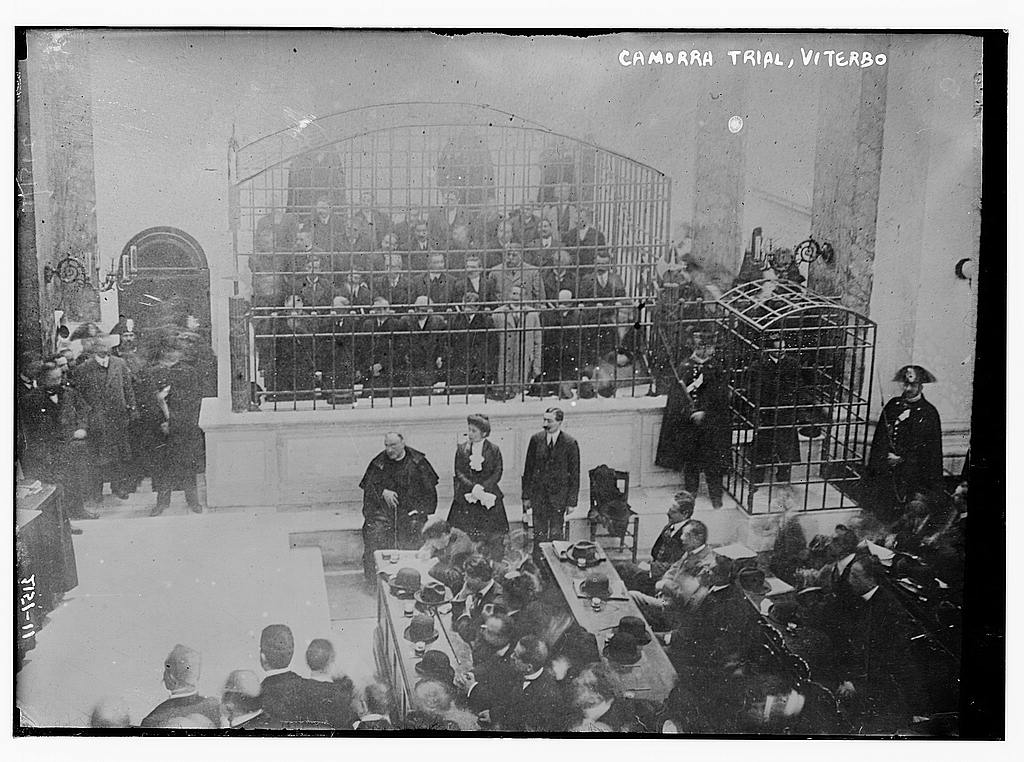
The Cuocolo trial in Viterbo. Most of the defendants are in the large cage. The three in front are (from left to right) the priest Ciro Vitozzi, Maria Stendardo, the only female defendant, and Enrico Alfano. In the small cage to the right is the crown witness Gennaro Abbatemaggio.

On 27 March 1909, the Assistant Public Prosecutor committed 47 persons for trial by the Court of Assizes in Naples. However, due to many attempts to corrupt the authorities and other obstacles the trial was transferred to the Court of Assizes in Viterbo, 250 kilometres from Naples and 80 kilometres north of Rome. The transfer of the defendants from Naples to Viterbo in January 1911 led to riots and fears for attempts to liberate the prisoners.

Funds to pay the defendant's lawyers were reportedly collected in Naples and from Neapolitan restaurants in New York. The amount collected was 50,000 lire, or US$10,000, at the start of the trial. Giovanni Rapi, the Camorra's "treasurer", had an interest in several private banks in New York where the savings of immigrants were forwarded to Italy. The New York defence fund treasurer was Andrea Attanasio, also sought in connection with the Cuocolo matter.

The trial was transformed from a murder trial into one against the Camorra as a whole. The hearings began in the spring of 1911 and would continue for twelve months. Captain Fabbroni intended to use the trial to strike the final blow to the Camorra. The trial was Fabbroni's finest moment. He testified in 21 hearings and his testimony filled 285 pages. He accused the police, politicians and even the judiciary of being involved with the Camorra.

All defendants claimed they were innocent. "I am the victim of yellow journalism," Alfano told the judge. "I have been ruined by the Carabinieri. The story that I have been the head of the Camorra is a legend. I was neither its head nor its tail. I admit that I have committed some excesses. What youth of my social class in Naples has not?"

== Convictions ==
After a 17-month trial, the often tumultuous proceedings ended with a guilty verdict on 8 July 1912. The defendants, including 27 leading Camorra bosses, were sentenced to a total of 354 years' imprisonment. The main defendants Enrico Alfano and Giovanni Rapi were sentenced to 30 years. The priest Vitozzi received seven years and government witness Abbatemaggio five years. The jury had been held in isolation since March 1911. The reports of the proceedings were about 40,000 pages in 63 volumes.

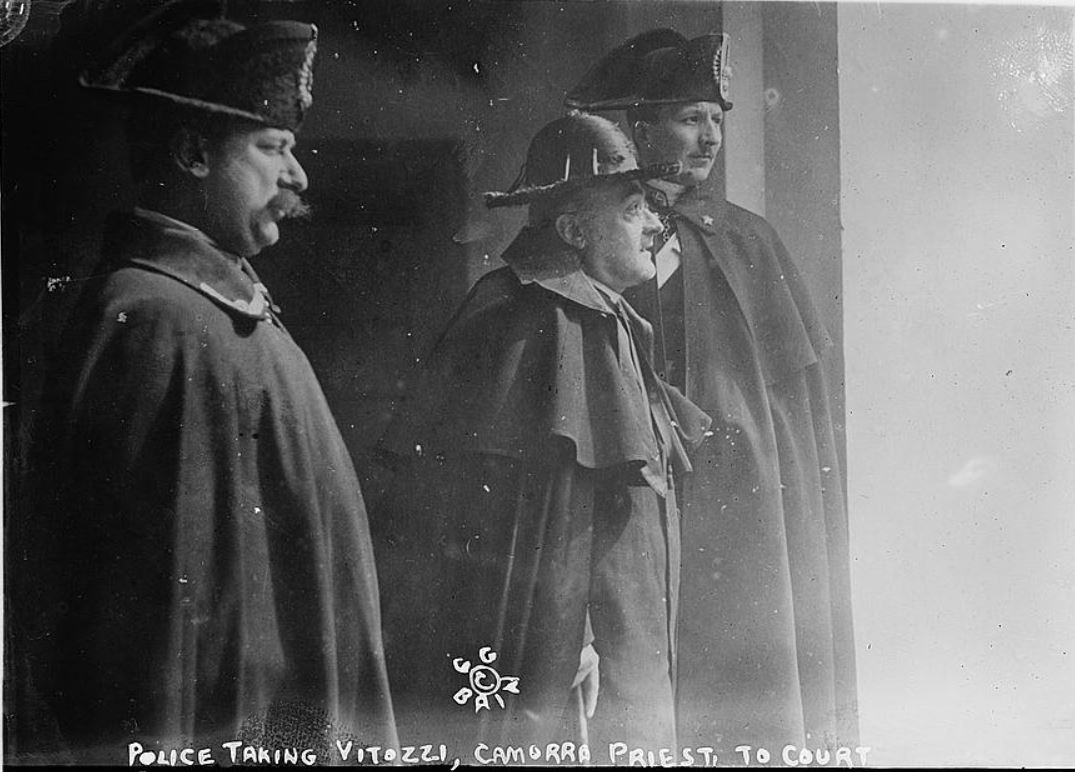
Police taking Camorra priest Ciro Vitozzi to court

In his last statement before the verdict, a furious Alfano accused the authorities to have killed his brother Ciro, who had died in prison. Another defendant, Gennaro De Marinis, who was sentenced to 30 years as well, slashed his throat with a piece of glass in the Court when the verdict was delivered. The proclamation of the sentence was received with "uproarious protests", according to a report of the New York Tribune. According to The New York Times, the men "acted like wild beasts."

One defendant shouted: "We are innocent. This is legal assassination." Some of them shook their fists at the judge and others tore at the bars of the cage where the defendants had to attend the trial. The condemned priest, Vitozzi, knelt praying and wept. "All the prisoners acted like maniacs," the Tribune report said, and the guards had difficulty maintaining order and carry the wounded Di Marinis out of the cage. A battalion of army troops with fixed bayonets stood outside the courthouse out of fear that there would be an attempt to liberate the prisoners.

The Cuocolo Trial dealt the Camorra a decisive blow. The historical Camorra in its 19th century form, known as the Honoured Society or Bella Società Riformata, would disappear after the trial and, in its traditional form, would no longer appear. According to Camorra legend not long after the Cuocolo verdict, on 25 May 1915, a few remaining camorristi met in the Sanita area of Naples and disbanded the organisation. The trial also confirmed the Camorra’s social marginality and political subalternity to the ruling powers in the kingdom of Italy who, after using it, had no difficulty in eliminating it. What remained was the individual guappo as a local street boss in the Neapolitan neighbourhoods, who operated in much the same way a typical camorrista had done – many of them were former or sons of camorristi –, but the overarching structure of the criminal brotherhood in Naples was gone.

== Legitimacy of the trial ==
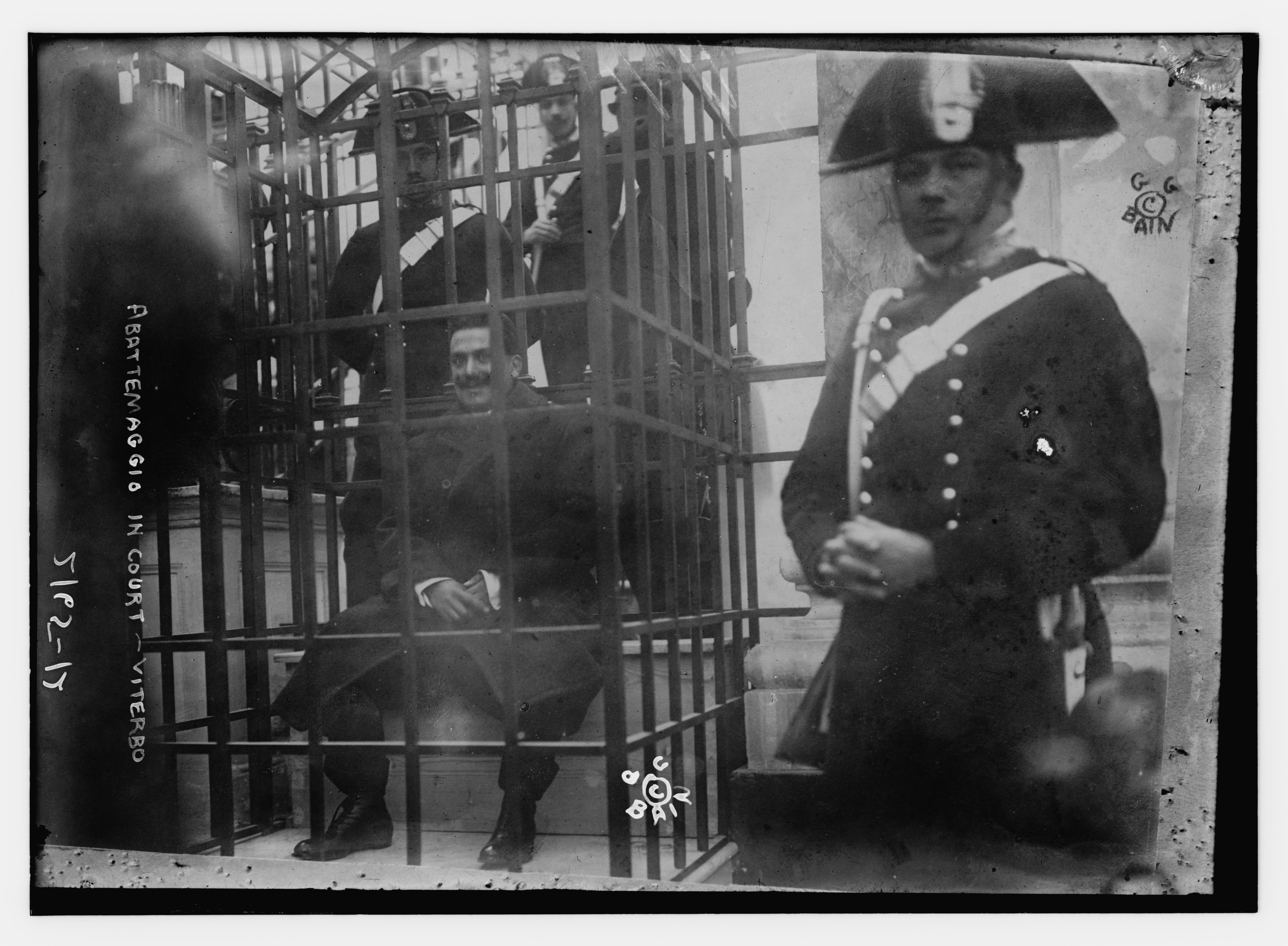
Gennaro Abattemaggio in court at the Cuocolo trial

Many legal experts, both contemporary and later, advanced doubts about the regularity of the investigation and considered the trial 'false' and based on 'rigged papers' motivated to inflict a setback on the Neapolitan underworld even at the cost of falsifying evidence. The murders and trial followed a series of scandals that had exposed the infiltration of the Camorra in Naples society and the city's governance structures. The 1901 Saredo Inquiry into corruption and bad governance in Naples City Hall, identified a system of political patronage ran by what the report called the "high Camorra" and the relations of the Camorra with Mayor Celestino Summonte and deputy Alberto Casale. In 1904, Alfano had been implicated in the active campaign of the Camorra against socialist deputy Ettore Ciccotti, who lost the election.

A member of the jury at the trial, the German language teacher Emilio Donatelli, who had voted for the non-guilt of the Camorra bosses, pointed out this confusion of intentions during the trial in a letter to a judge at the Court of Cassation: "In the Cuocolo trial there was a confusion of moral and legal concepts. The thesis of the rehabilitation of Neapolitan customs and the legal thesis of the ascertainment of those responsible for the specific Cuocolo crime are two essentially different things... Everyone wanted the defendants convicted in the name of the moral regeneration of Naples". The trial was designed to target the Camorra and its affiliates, not the perpetrators of the double murder.

In May 1927, fifteen years later, government witness Gennaro Abbatemaggio withdrew his accusations in a letter to the defense lawyer Rocco Salomone. He had been forced to collaborate with Fabbroni, who had threatened to charge him the Cuocolo murders, and had arranged his release from prison and had given him money and other benefits. Abbatemaggio said he had invented everything about a crime of which he knew nothing. Captain Fabbroni had spent 350,000 lire to bribe key defence witnesses and leading journalists, according to Abbatemaggio. He described the case as "a setup against the leaders of the Neapolitan Camorra organized by him in accordance with the collaborators of Captain Fabbroni." However, despite serious doubts of several magistrates about the legitimacy of the trial, the case was never reopened.

In 1930, a request for pardon was made by Salomone and the Neapolitan newspaper Il Mattino, which at the time of the trial had strongly supported the work of Fabbroni and the prosecution. Alfano's sister, Rosina Alfano, tried to convince the suspected real killer Gaetano Amodeo – who privately admitted to have been the slayer and had been identified as such by the first inquiry of the Naples police – to publicly confess the murder, which he refused to do. In subsequent years, the requests for pardon came before Benito Mussolini one by one. In his own hand the Duce wrote on those instances: "Provisions should be individually, ranging measures over time." Alfano was granted a conditional release for good behaviour on 16 October 1934, after serving 27 years of his sentence.

== Media attention ==
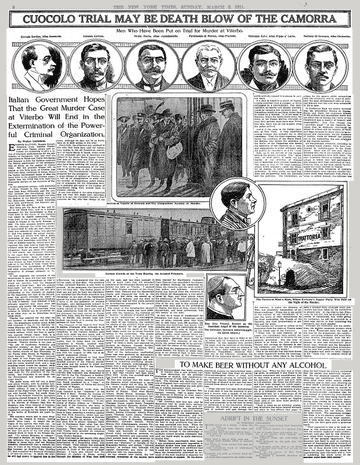
Cuocolo Trial May Be Death Blow of The Camorra. March 5, 1911, New York Times, Page 4 article.

The trial became a major media event, so much so that it can be described as an early example of a media trial, According to historian John Dickie, the trial

was the stuff of a newspaperman's dreams. Tales of a secret sect risen from the brothels and taverns of the slums to infiltrate the salons and clubs of the elite. Police corruption and political malpractice. A cast of heroic Carabinieri, villainous gangsters, histrionic lawyers and even a camorra priest. The drama that unfolded in Viterbo seemed to have been fashioned expressly for the new media age.

Alfano claimed that he was a victim of the sensational yellow journalism. Il Mattino sent its crime expert Ernesto Serao to Viterbo and devoted two or three pages a day to the event, usually in support of the indictment of Captain Fabbroni. The editor Scarfoglio did things on a grand scale: he organised filming of the hearings during the day in Viterbo, had the film transported with great speed to Naples, to screen it the next evening in the public shopping gallery Galleria Umberto I, next to the newspaper office, in mute (as sound film was not yet available), with megaphone commentary by a journalist, with an enormous influx of spectators. According to Abbatemaggio, Scarfoglio had received 40,000 lire from the Carabinieri to support their version of the trial.

The trial not only made headlines in Italy, but worldwide, and there was substantial official and media attention in the United States, from New York City in particular. The principal defendant, Enrico Alfano, had been linked by New York Times correspondent Walter Littlefield to the murder of New York police lieutenant Joe Petrosino in Palermo in 1909 (the murder has since been attributed to the Sicilian Mafia). Littlefield fully followed Fabbroni's line of accusation, describing the Camorra as 'the largest and most perfectly organised society of criminals on earth' that was linked to the Black Hand extortion rackets in New York; a defeat of the Camorra in Italy would mean 'the dissolution of the brains of the Black Hand in America'. The trial was attended by the former mayor of New York City, George B. McClellan, in whose administration Petrosino had been killed. The trial even became a tourist attraction for Americans, and Fabbroni was showered with love letters.

Arthur Train, who as a former assistant to New York County District Attorney William Travers Jerome had dealt with Italian criminals that had emigrated to the United States and the Black Hand extortion rackets, also attended the Cuocolo Trial to study the organisation and the functioning of Italian justice. According to Train, U.S. newspapers "indulged in torrents of bitter criticism at the manner in which the trial of the Camorra prisoners at Viterbo is being conducted, and have commonly compared the court itself to a 'bear garden', a 'circus,' or a 'cage of monkeys,'" with the unexpressed suggestion that if the case had been tried in the U.S. it would have been more effectively been disposed of.

== In popular culture ==
- Forgione, Louis (1928). The Men of Silence, New York, E. P. Dutton. The book is a novelization of the Cuocolo murder and trial based on the trial records, with a foreword by Walter Littlefield, the New York Times correspondent who had reported on the case.
- The City Stands Trial (Italian: Processo alla città), a 1952 Italian drama film directed by Luigi Zampa and starring Amedeo Nazzari is based on a revisiting of the Cuocolo murders and the struggle for control of Naples by the Camorra in the early 1900s.
- The 1969 documentary film Il processo Cuocolo, directed by Gianni Serra, as part of the 'Teatro inchiesta' series, is based on the trial documents, in particular the position of the dissident jury member Donatelli. To accentuate the documentary purpose of the film, the actors did not wear period clothing.

== Sources ==
- (in Italian) Azzarelli, Andrea (August 2018). "Cesare Ballanti. Una carriera di polizia tra la Sicilia degli anni settanta dell'ottocento e la Napoli del processo Cuocolo (1846-1910)" (PDF). Mediterranea Ricerche Storiche. XV (43): 315-334. doi:10.1929/1828-230X/43152018.
- (in Italian) Barbagallo, Francesco (2010). Storia della camorra. Rome: Laterza. ISBN 978-88-420-9259-9.
- Behan, Tom (2005). The Camorra: Political Criminality in Italy. New York: Routledge. ISBN 0-203-99291-1.
- Critchley, David (2009). The Origin of Organized Crime in America: The New York City Mafia, 1891-1931. New York: Routledge. ISBN 978-0-415-99030-1.
- Dickie, John (2012). Mafia Brotherhoods: The Rise of the Italian Mafias. London: Sceptre. ISBN 978-0-340-96394-4.
- (in Italian) Di Fiore, Gigi (1993). Potere camorrista: quattro secoli di malanapoli. Naples: Guida Editori. ISBN 88-7188-084-6.
- (in Italian) Iermano, Toni (2009). ""Sarebbe piaciuto a Maupassant". Mater camorra di Luigi Compagnone" (PDF). Critica Letteraria. XXVII (144): 541–566.
- (in Italian) Paliotti, Vittorio (2006). Storia della Camorra (PDF). Rome: Newton Compton. ISBN 88-541-0713-1.
- Snowden, Frank M. (1995). Naples in the Time of Cholera, 1884-1911. Cambridge: Cambridge University Press. ISBN 0-521-48310-7.
- Train, Arthur Cheney (1912). Courts, criminals, and the Camorra (PDF). New York: C. Scribner's Sons.
