= Wop =

Slur for Italians or people of Italian descent

Wop is a pejorative term for Italians or people of Italian descent.

== Etymology ==
The Merriam-Webster dictionary states wop's first known use was in the United States in 1908, and that it originates from the Southern Italian dialectal term guappo, roughly meaning "dandy", or "swaggerer", derived from the Spanish term guapo, meaning "good-looking", "dandy", from Latin vappa for "sour wine", also "worthless fellow".

In Neapolitan and other Southern Italo-Romance varieties, guappo is pronounced roughly as wahp-po. As word-final vowels in Southern Italian varieties are often realized as /ə/, guappo would often sound closer to wahpp to anglophones. Guappo historically refers to a type of flashy, boisterous, swaggering, dandy-like man. The word eventually became associated with members of the Camorra and has often been used in the Naples area as a friendly or humorous term of address among men. The word likely transformed into the slur "wop" following the arrival of poor Italian immigrants into the United States. The term guappo was especially used by older Italian immigrant males to refer to the younger Italian male immigrants arriving in America.

=== False etymologies ===
One false etymology or backronym of wop is that it is an acronym for "without passport" or "without papers", implying that Italian immigrants entered the U.S. as illegal immigrants. The term has nothing to do with immigration documents, as these were not required by U.S. immigration officers until 1924, after the slur had already come into use in the United States.

Another backronym is that wop stands for "working on pavement", based on a stereotype that Italian immigrants and Italian-American men typically do manual labor such as road-building. Turning acronyms into words did not become common practice until after World War II, accelerating along with the growth of the US space-program and the Cold War. The first use of wop significantly predates that period.

== See also ==
- List of ethnic slurs
- Anti-Italian sentiment
