= Ciccio Cappuccio =

Italian Camorra boss

- Born: c. 1842; Naples, Two Sicilies
- Died: 5 December 1892 (aged 49–50); Naples, Kingdom of Italy
- Other name: 'O Signorino
- Known for: Head of the Bella Società Riformata (present-day Camorra)
- Allegiance: Camorra

Francesco "Ciccio" Cappuccio (c. 1842 – 5 December 1892), also known as 'O Signorino for his elegant manners, was a legendary guappo and the capintesta (head-in-chief) of the Camorra, a Mafia-type organisation in Naples in Italy, in the last half of the 19th century. He is credited with modernizing the Bella Società Riformata (Beautiful Reformed Society) as the Camorra was known then. The mythicization of his person mixes fact, fiction and legend, not least because of the journalism at the time.

== Camorra background ==
Ciccio Cappuccio was raised in a known criminal family in the infamous Imbrecciata street in the Vicaria neighbourhood in Naples, a zone full of violence, prostitution and camorristi. The family ruled the area since 1756 when Leopoldo Cappuccio, known as 'O Mastriano, imposed his authority. In 1781, a Royal decree ordered all brothels in Naples to be moved to the Imbrecciata, which became the only zone where prostitution was tolerated.

The only authority that ruled the area was the Camorra, which maintained order by force as a kind of unappointed justice of the peace while demanding kickbacks. In 1853, Ciccio Cappuccio took over the reins of his father Antonio Totonno Cappuccio, who ran a tavern in the area.

In 1855, the municipality surrounded the Imbrecciata prostitution area with a high wall to close off the neighbourhood. When the forces of Giuseppe Garibaldi advanced towards Naples in June 1860 in an effort to unify Italy, political unrest increased in the city. Cappuccio formed a demonstration with hundreds of prostitutes and camorristi in redshirts – the symbol of Garibaldi – and tore down the wall. The next day, authorities ordered the rebuilding of the wall. On the night of 27–28 August 1860, when Garibaldi was closing in on Naples, Cappuccio led another assault on the wall and destroyed it again.

Meanwhile, Garibaldi’s troops were preparing to enter the city, and a major battle seemed inevitable. Desperate to avoid large-scale bloodshed, the police chief, Liborio Romano, turned to the head of the Camorra, Salvatore De Crescenzo, to maintain order and appointed him as head of the municipal guard. Cappuccio also entered the Camorra-dominated guard. As such, he understood the changing political climate and did not oppose the rebuilding of the wall, threatening anyone who dared to oppose his decision.

== Head-in-chief of the Camorra ==
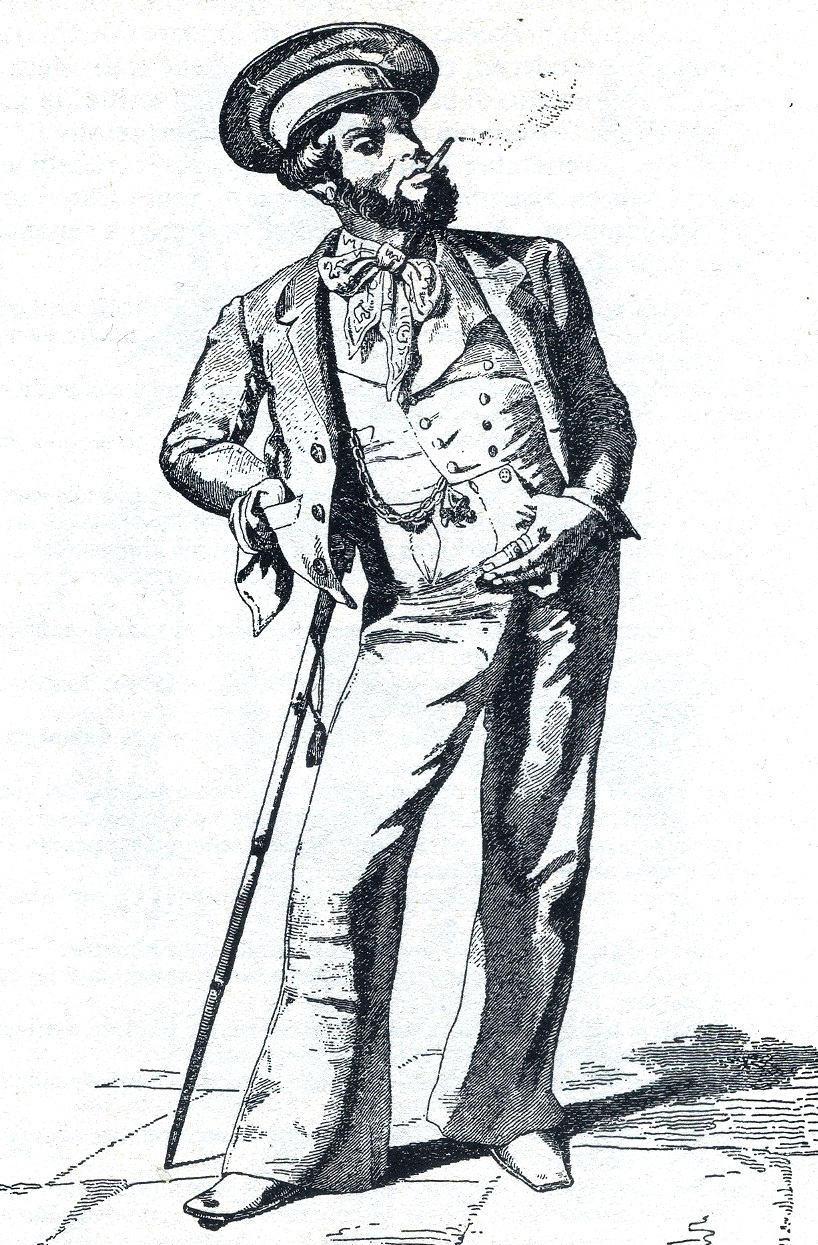
A guappo in typical dress at the mid 19th century. Drawing by Filippo Palizzi, 1866.

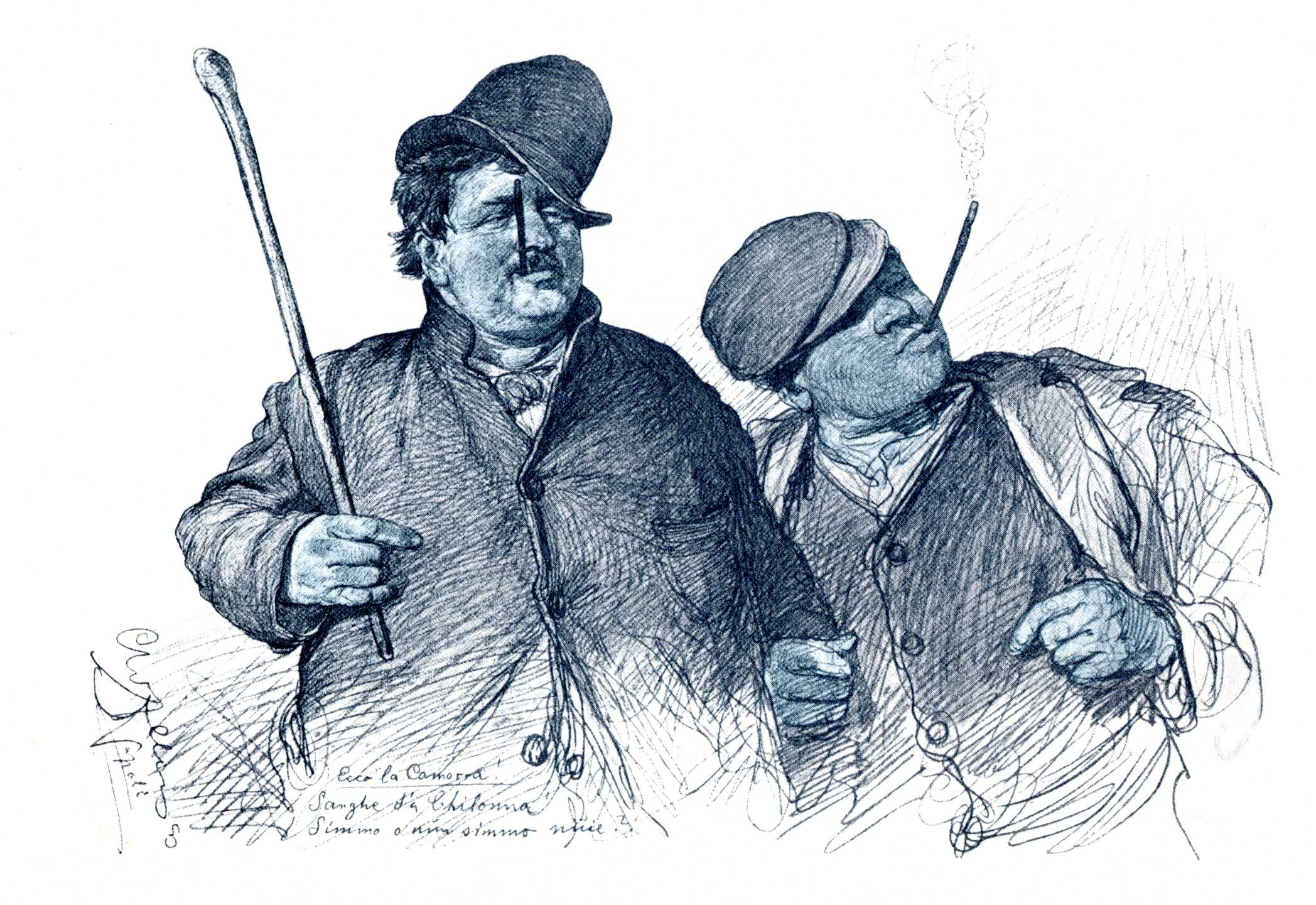
Ecco la Camorra (This is the Camorra). Drawing by Christian Wilhelm Allers, in "La bella Napoli" (1893)

Naples was divided into 12 districts at the time, and the criminal activities in each district were headed by a caposocietà (or capintrito). These ringleaders elected a capintesta (head-in-chief), the general head of the Neapolitan Camorra, which for a long period corresponded to the caposocietà of the Vicaria district to the east of the city, between the prisons and the courts. There the command of the organisation remained in the hands of the Cappuccio family for quite some time.

In 1869, Ciccio Cappuccio was elected as the capintesta of the Camorra by the twelve district heads (capintriti), succeeding Salvatore De Crescenzo after a short interregnum. Both Cappuccio and De Crescenzo were arrested on 6 October 1869, with some 80 other camorristi. He was released after a month, and rumour has it that the arrest was merely a plot so that Cappuccio could thank the Camorra inmates for his election and hear their demands.

After his release from prison, Cappuccio left the Imbrecciata and moved to the elegant Via Nardones. Close to his house he opened a vrennaiuolo shop selling bran and carob at the piazza San Ferdinando. The criminal control of the horse 'supply chain' was a fundamental segment of camorristic activity, in which most ringleaders, including Cappuccio, operated first and foremost. Criminal control began at auctions of the army's horse scraps, which were hoarded at low prices, thanks to the elimination of competition. The second step was the trade in bran and locust beans for animal feed, and this was the official activity carried out by many of the ringleaders. The sale of those commodities allowed them to control the ranks of the crews of coachmen and stable boys, on which they imposed the purchase of fodder for their horses. They also facilitated money lending at usury rates.

Cappuccio's stature as a powerful crime boss rose not only within the Camorra, but also in powerful circles of the Neapolitan society. He was approached by the police chief of Naples, Ermanno Sangiorgi, the same one who in 1898 in Sicily would write one of the first reports on the Sicilian Mafia. Sangiorgi asked Cappuccio to recover a gold watch studded with gems stolen from Baroness Nicotera-Ricco, wife of the then Minister of the Interior, Giovanni Nicotera. A few years later, Cappuccio's intercession proved necessary to also recover the gold snuff box stolen from Michele Pironti, Attorney General and future Minister of Justice.

== Reforming the Camorra ==
Cappuccio modernized the Bella Società Riformata (Beautiful Reformed Society) as the Camorra was known at the time. He established the rule that a Camorrista had to have a regular job as a cover. Much criticized at the time, given that members were almost all vagrants, this innovation later proved useful when special laws against the associations of criminals were issued and the criminals could prove to have honest and stable work. Together with his two lieutenants, Ettore Longo and Gaetano Buongiorno, the new capintesta also compiled a new code for the Beautiful Reformed Society. The most interesting article, the one that revolutionized the ancient customs of the association, was marked with the number 151, and aimed to reduce the number of dichiaramenti (duels) that continuously took place in the streets of Naples between Camoristi, killing each other and endangering the lives of passers-by.

All these innovations generated discontent on the board of the capintriti. In April 1874 he staged a kind of coup d’etat in the Beautiful Reformed Society, deposing many district bosses and replacing them with others he could trust. His adversaries tried to have him killed. On 23 April 1874, a masked hitman entered Cappuccio’s shop on Piazza San Ferdinando and shot at him four times; one bullet grating his face. Rumour soon spread that the capintesta was dead. The news even reached the newspapers, causing uproar. The next day, his face bandaged, Cappuccio mounted a carriage and crossed half of Naples showing he was still alive. To celebrate the narrow escape, he went on a pilgrimage to Montevergine and reaffirmed his leadership.

The episode established his reputation of being invulnerable. To a certain extent, this was true because, since the failed assassination attempt, he wore a special steel mesh manufactured for him by a gunsmith. From that moment he became a sort of absolute monarch of the Beautiful Reformed Society, abolishing the annual meetings of the district heads to elect the head-in-chief. His reputation was such that some camorristi preferred to commit suicide rather than be called before the Gran Mamma, the supreme tribunal of the Camorra.

== Death, myth and legend ==
At 50 years old, Cappuccio died on 5 December 1892 from a heart attack while he was having dinner. Euphoric by a surplus of wine, he declared to his followers that he would be able to eat an entire tureen of codfish. He won the bet, and hundreds of camorrists applauded him. He got up to thank them, stammered a few words, then slumped his head on the laid table, in the throes of a heart attack. The "king of Naples" ('‘o rre 'e Napole) was dead, according to an obituary in the Neapolitan daily newspaper Il Mattino, that depicted Cappuccio as "a righter of wrongs" and as "a proletarian justice of the peace".

At his funeral, the hearse, pulled by three pairs of black horses and covered with wreaths of flowers, was followed by over fifty carriages. The procession made its way around Naples, where the shops closed as a sign of mourning and respect. Three days after his death, Ferdinando Russo, a popular poet of the period, published a poem "Canzone 'e Ciccio Cappuccio" in Il Mattino, immortalising the legendary Camorra chief. Days after his death, 'relics' began to circulate: small bottles filled with his blood, pieces of bone, strips of skin, probably taken by funeral workers, to do business on one of the Camorra bosses most celebrated by followers.

He was succeeded by Enrico Alfano. Other sources mention that after the death of Cappuccio, Giuseppe Chirico, 'o Granatiere (The Grenadier), from the Porta San Gennaro neighbourhood was elected. He was defeated in a zumpata – a kind of ritual initiation knife duel – by Totonno 'o pappagallo (The Parrot) – so-named for his beak parrot nose – who took over the reign before being defeated by Alfano.

Over the years, more legends grew around his personality distorting the facts by fiction. Acts of other camorristi were attributed to him, including that of having quelled the August 1893 popular revolt in Naples incited by a strike of horse-cab drivers notoriously linked to the Camorra, against the extension of tramways, which, in fact, happened eight months after the death of Cappuccio.

The most retold legend is the one when he entered the prison of San Francisco for the first time. He had a stutter and could not stand the orders of the master of the wool mill where he worked. One day, with unexpected violence, he took his knife and slashed it across the face of his employer. Ciccio was arrested and sentenced to seven years in jail. When he entered the prison cell, he was approached with the usual request for lamp oil; the customary kickback new inmates had to pay. Cappuccio refused and was attacked by twenty inmates. Only one emerged unscathed from the battle: Ciccio Cappuccio. Twelve ended up with battered heads and seven with broken arms. The story was recounted in Russo's poem, but is largely a myth.

== Sources ==
- (in Italian) Barbagallo, Francesco (2010). Storia della camorra, Rome: Laterza ISBN 978-88-420-9259-9
- Behan, Tom (1996). The Camorra, London: Routledge, ISBN 0-415-09987-0
- (in Italian) Consiglio, Alberto (2005). La camorra a Napoli, Naples: Guida Editori, ISBN 88-7188-917-7
- Dickie, John (2014). Blood Brotherhoodsː A History of Italy's Three Mafias, New York: PublicAffairs, ISBN 978-1-61039-427-7
- (in Italian) Di Fiore, Gigi (1993). Potere camorrista: quattro secoli di malanapoli, Naples: Guida Editori, ISBN 88-7188-084-6
- (in Italian) Nicaso, Antonio (2018). Sangue e miti della Bella Società Riformata, la Camorra di primo Ottocento, Forum Italicum: A Journal of Italian Studies, Volume 52, Issue 2 DOI: 10.1177/0014585818757202
- (in Italian) Paliotti, Vittorio (2006). Storia della Camorra, Rome: Newton Compton editore, ISBN 88-541-0713-1
