= Antonio Scarfoglio =

Antonio Scarfoglio (5.7.1886–19.4.1969), Neapolitan journalist and author. Antonio Scarfoglio was the son of Edoardo Scarfoglio and Matilde Serao, both well-known Neapolitan writers of the turn of the 20th century and founders of il Mattino, the large Neapolitan daily newspaper.

He broke into reporting with a dramatic account of the devastating 1906 eruption of Mt. Vesuvius. In 1908 he was one of the three-man team that manned the Züst, the Italian entry in the six-car around-the-world automobile race, known as The Great Race. The Italian car was one of the eventual three finishers. Scarfoglio wrote a book about that exploit: Il giro del mondo in automobile (Round the World in a Motor-Car) published in 1909.

He then reported on the 1908 Messina earthquake, and in June of the following year reported from Adana, Turkey, on the infamous massacre of the Armenian population. In 1910 he published a widely read interview in the Paris paper, Le Matin, with empress Eugenie, the wife of Napoleon III; he co-founded a film journal, L'arte muta (The Silent Art) in 1915 and in 1924 was responsible for producing Italy's first newspaper photo supplement section, il Mattino Illustrato, using the new rotogravure printing process. In general, he is viewed as one who took advantage of the good fortune of living in the same age as prominent literary and political figures of the young nation-state of modern Italy such as D'Annunzio and Crispi in order to help shape early Italian journalism.
