= Guappo =

Historical criminal subculture and term of address in Neapolitan language

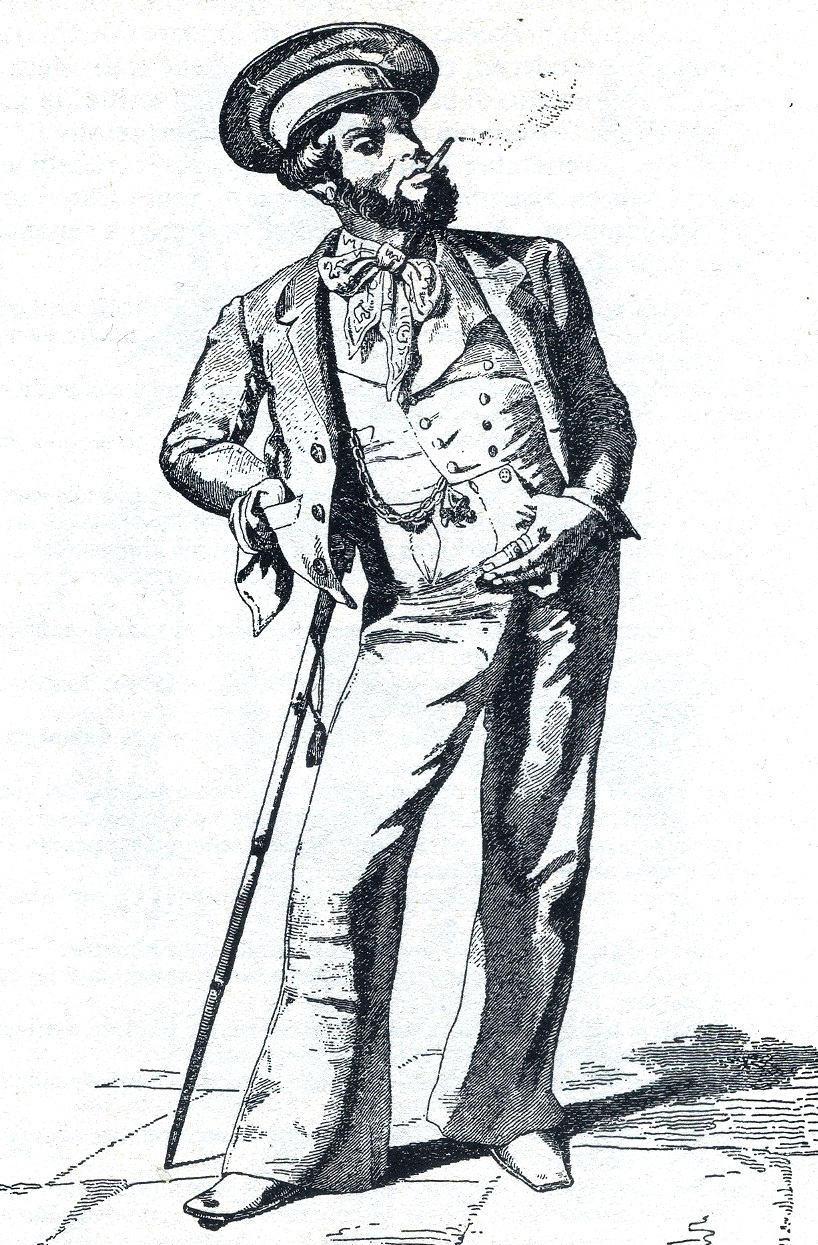
A guappo in typical dress at the end of the 19th century. Drawing by Filippo Palizzi, 1866.

Guappo (plural: guappi) is a historical Italian criminal subculture and informal term of address in the Neapolitan language, roughly analogous to or meaning thug, swaggerer, pimp, braggart, or ruffian. While today the word is often used to indicate a member of the Camorra, a Mafia-type organisation in the region of Campania and its capital Naples, the guapperia (or guapparia; i.e., the guappo subculture) predates the modern Camorra and was originally a different and separate criminal subculture that considered itself very much independent of the Camorra.

Historically, guappo referred to a loosely cohesive 19th- and early 20th-century subculture that thrived in the Naples area and, to a lesser extent, nearby regions of Southern Italy. The subculture stereotypically consisted of a type of boisterous, flashy, swaggering, free-spirited, and violent yet dandy-like criminal, pimp, outlaw, and ruffian that nonetheless followed a somewhat chivalrous code of honor.

== Etymology ==
The word most likely derives from the Spanish guapo (Southern Italy had been under Spanish rule for centuries), meaning bold, elegant, or an ostentatious person, and which eventually derives from the Latin vappa, meaning flat wine or scoundrel. The noun guapparia, which is sometimes also used to indicate the Camorra, means arrogance, domineering, or braggart. The verb guappia means to behave like a guappo (Camorrista), to be domineering and derives from the Spanish guapear (to feign courage, to flaunt elegance).

The word also might be derived from the Garduña, a fictitious criminal organisation in Spain said to be the precursor of the Camorra. The Garduña was composed of guapos, generally good swordsmen, daring assassins, and committed bandits.

The word wop, a pejorative American ethnic slur for an Italian, probably derives from guappo.

== Characteristics ==
Though the term today often refers to a member of the Camorra (i.e. a Camorrista), the historical figure of the "guappo" is not necessarily synonymous with the Camorrista. It is a historical figure in the Neapolitan area, distinguishable by his smart or overdressed dandy-like appearance, his unusual pose that serves to draw attention to him, and the particular care he lavishes on his body and face. The guappo could be characterized as "simple" or "posh" according to the clothes he wore: the former preferred extravagant and flashy clothes while the latter loved to dress in clothes from the best tailors in Naples.

Originally, the guappo was rather a violent free spirit; free from the law as well as the "official" Camorra, with his proper code of honour, at once an extortionist, criminal, and often a pimp, while also a rectifier of wrong for the local neighbourhood and a benefactor of artists of the café chantant. He was sometimes allied with, and sometimes a rival of the Camorra. Around 1860, a guappo was described as an independent and individualist camorrista.

When the Camorra as an organisation was weak, the guappo flourished. After the first mass trial against the Camorra in 1911-12, and the advent of Fascist rule the Camorra as an organisation was nearly destroyed. The local guappo returned and the interwar period (1918–1939) was the heyday of the individualist guappo power. After World War II, with the return of the Camorra, the figure of the guappo eventually merged into the organisation. A typical guappo of that era was Pasquale Simonetti, also known as "Pascalone ‘e Nola", who controlled the Naples fruit market. He was married to Pupetta Maresca and famous for publicly slapping American Mafia boss, Lucky Luciano, at the Agnano racetrack. (In fact, the perpetrator was Francesco Pirozzi, known as Ciccillo 'o francese, one of the men of Camorra boss Alfredo Maisto.)

== In art and popular culture ==
The Guappo is present in Neapolitan drama, music and literature, such as the Neapolitan song "Guapparia" by of the poet Libero Bovio, in works of the author Raffaele Viviani, and the journalists Ferdinando Russo and Matilde Serao.

The comedian Totò played a role of an ordinary person bullied by a guappo in The Gold of Naples (Italian: L'oro di Napoli) a 1954 Italian comedy film directed by Vittorio De Sica.

The Neapolitan composer of operas Domenico Cimarosa features a Guappo in his 1786 opera Il credulo. The transition from guapparia to Camorra in the mid-20th Century is portrayed in several filmic sceneggiate starring Italian actor and singer Mario Merola, who often played the role of an old-style "guappo" standing up against the injustices brought about by the Camorra; examples include Sgarro alla camorra ("Affront to the Camorra", 1973) and L'ultimo guappo ("The last guappo", 1978).

In the 1974 American film The Godfather Part II, the character of Don Fanucci is depicted as carrying himself and dressing like a stereotypical guappo.
