= Giuseppe Chirico =

- Born: c. 1839; Naples, Kingdom of the Two Sicilies
- Died: 16 September 1900 (aged 60–61); Naples, Italy
- Other name: 'O Granatiere
- Known for: Head of the Bella Società Riformata (present-day Camorra)
- Allegiance: Camorra

Giuseppe Chirico, (c. 1839 – 16 September 1900) also known as o' Granatiere ("The Grenadier"), was an Italian boss of the Camorra, a Mafia-type organisation in Naples in Italy, at the end of the 19th century.

== Early life ==
According to his obituary in La Stampa newspaper, Chirico was one of the most renowned and most feared characters of the Neapolitan underworld from 1860 onwards and a friend of the famous Ciccio Cappuccio. Chirico hailed from the Stella neighbourhood in Naples around Porta San Gennaro. As his nickname suggests, he served in the army, but deserted more often than he enlisted. During his life he was in and out prison. In 1876, while incarcerated in the Concordia prison he was appointed capo di società in the Camorra of the Porta San Gennaro section.

He was elected capintesta (head-in-chief) of the Camorra after the death of Ciccio Cappuccio in 1892. The election process determined that the tallest among the capintriti or district bosses would become the head of the organisation. Chirico, who measured more than 1m90, became the new chief.

== Head of the Camorra ==
According to journalist Vittorio Paliotti, who wrote a history of the Camorra, Chirico would go down in the history of the Camorra as the most cowardly and most timid headman that ever existed. The news of the election of the "Grenadier" to the highest position, had surprised everyone. Chirico had never been challenged or participated in a zumpata – a kind of ritual initiation knife duel. He had made a career only with diplomacy and smiles.

Although the conclave of the twelve district heads had decided in favour of Chirico, another popular leader, Antonio Palladino, known as Totonno 'o Pappagallo, with many followers, contested the election. The matter was settled in a zumpata, in which, according to one source, Chirico was killed. According to Paliotti, Chirico, due to his inexperience with weapons, was wounded at the first blow and, to save himself, threw the knife to the ground and declared himself defeated. After his win 'o Pappagallo was elected with all the votes, but had been sentenced to go to prison. Two of the twelve districts, Vicaria and Mercato, decided that his alternate, the young Enrico Alfano, would assume effective powers. After 'o Pappagallo left prison, he was defeated in yet another duel by Alfano around the turn of the century.

== Later Camorra activity and death ==
Chirico apparently had not lost his standing in the Camorra. In later years, he exercised his Camorra privileges in the horse trade at the Royal Horse Depot in Santa Maria Capua Vetere and ran a bran shop in Piazza Cavour. The control of the horse 'supply chain' was a fundamental feature of camorristic criminal activity. Criminal control began at auctions of the army's horse scraps, which were hoarded at low prices, thanks to the elimination of competition. The second step was the trade in bran and locust beans for animal feed. The sale of those commodities allowed them to control the ranks of the crews of coachmen and stable boys, on which they imposed the purchase of fodder for their horses.

In 1893, he cooperated in ending the famous coachmen's strike in Naples, a three-day popular revolt in Naples incited by horse-cab drivers notoriously linked to the Camorra, who called for a strike against the agreement between the city administration and the Belgian tram company Société Anonyme des Tramways Provinciaux (it), which provideded for the extension of the tramway line to other parts of the city seriously undercutting the Camorra-controlled horse-powered transport business in Naples.

After two years of suffering, died on 16 September 1900 at his home in Via Foria, 140, where he was born in 1839. According to his obituary, "he was well-liked by the inhabitants of his neighbourhood, to whom he was never stingy with advice or succour."

== Sources ==
- (in Italian) Barbagallo, Francesco (2010). Storia della camorra, Rome: Laterza ISBN 978-88-420-9259-9
- (in Italian) Brun, Riccardo (2012). La Propaganda. 1899, 1900: i due anni in cui rivoltammo Napoli, Naples: Caracò Editore, ISBN 978-88-9756-713-4
- (in Italian) Consiglio, Alberto (2005). La camorra a Napoli, Naples: Guida Editori, ISBN 88-7188-917-7
- (in Italian) Paliotti, Vittorio (2006). Storia della Camorra, Rome: Newton Compton editore, ISBN 88-541-0713-1
