= Enrico Alfano =

Chief of the Camorra, a Mafia-type organization

- Camorra boss Enrico Alfano at the Cuocolo trial in Viterbo in 1911
- Born: 1869 or 1870; Naples, Italy
- Died: 9 January 1940 (aged 70–71); Naples, Italy
- Other name: Erricone
- Citizenship: Italian
- Occupation: Camorra boss
- Allegiance: Camorra
- Criminal charge: Murder
- Penalty: 30 years imprisonment

Enrico Alfano (Italian pronunciation: [enˈriːko alˈfaːno]; 1869 or 1870 – 9 January 1940), also known as "Erricone", was considered to be one of the chiefs of the Camorra, a Mafia-type organisation in the region of Campania and its capital Naples in Italy, at the turn of the 20th century. He was described as "a kind of president of the confederation." According to some sources, Alfano was linked to the murder of New York City police lieutenant Joseph Petrosino in Palermo in 1909, however, the murder had since been attributed to the Sicilian Mafia.

Alfano was accused of being the man behind the murder of rival Camorra boss Gennaro Cuocolo and his wife. The trial against Alfano and his associates in Viterbo in 1911–12, expanded from a murder case into a tribunal against the Camorra and attracted a lot of attention of newspapers and the general public both in Italy as well as in the United States. He was sentenced to 30 years in prison in July 1912, and despite the fact that the legitimacy of the trial was seriously questioned when the main witness for the prosecution retracted, he was only released in 1934 after having served 27 years.

== Early life ==
The son of a shoemaker, Alfano began as a fruit merchant in Naples and speculating on the cattle fairs. He apparently became affiliated with the Camorra at an early age, but this is not certain because he was not mentioned in a 1901 investigation report by the Ministry of Interior – known as the Saredo Inquiry since it was led by senator Giuseppe Saredo – which unearthed an extensive political patronage system in the city of Naples. However, the inquiry revealed little about the inner workings of the Camorra. According to an informer, Alfano had become the head of the Camorra after the death of the legendary capintesta (head-in-chief) Ciccio Cappuccio in 1892, although other sources disagree over his rise to power.

According to The New York Times report on the Cuocolo trial in 1911, Alfano was below medium height but a man of commanding presence; across his cheek he bore a long scar, the sfregio (a knife slash for dishonour; a sign of Camorra punishment). The New York Times reported that he was arrested many times as an accomplice in homicide, robbery and less important charges, but had never been convicted. According to the Italian newspaper La Stampa, Alfano did spend six or seven years in prison, where he earned his initiation as a camorrista, which gave him the "right" to demand a tangente, protection money, from the merchants in the neighbourhood he controlled.

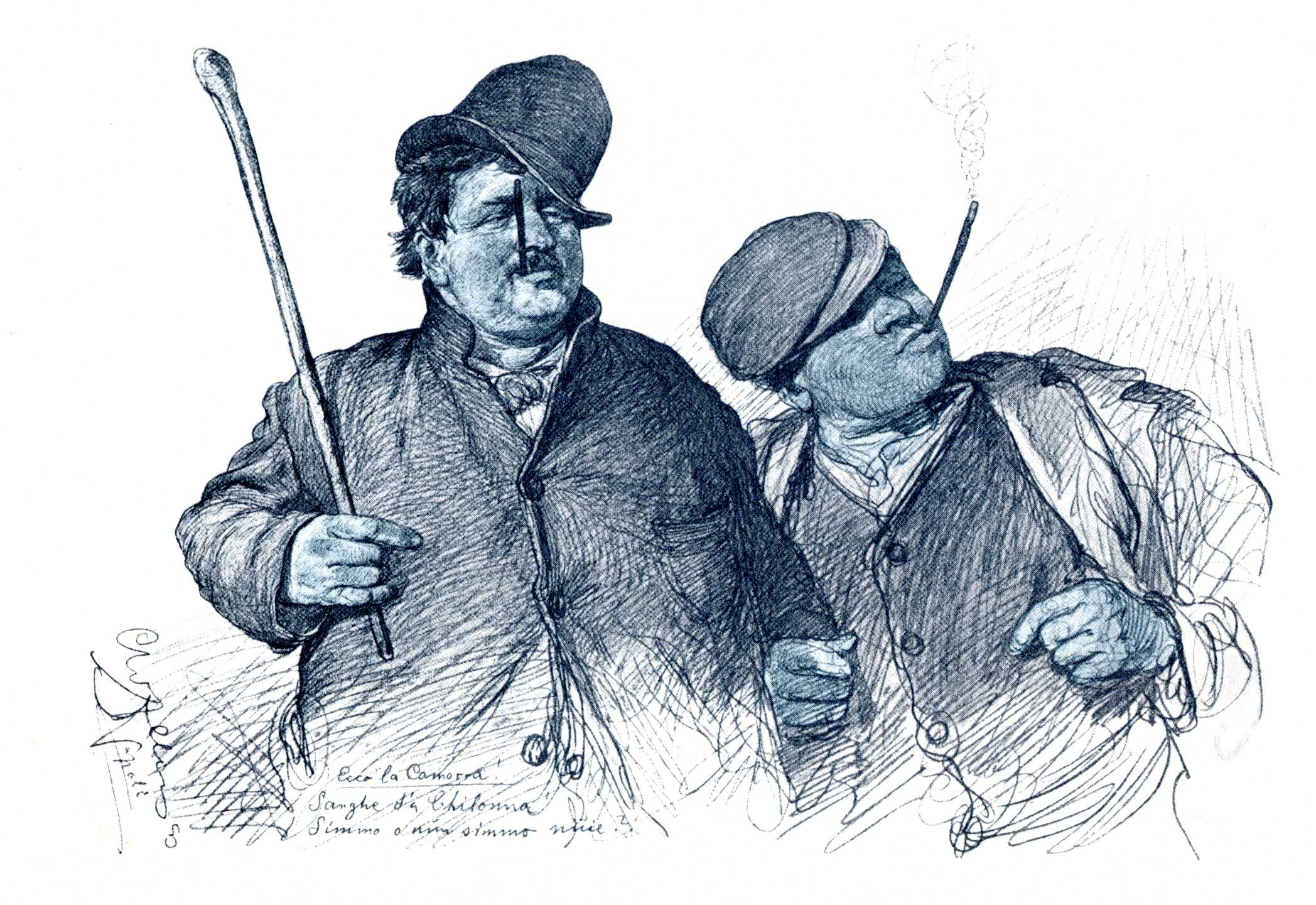
Ecco la Camorra (This is the Camorra). Drawing by Christian Wilhelm Allers, in "La bella Napoli" (1893)

Both sources agree that Alfano imposed his position when he defeated the Camorra head, the capintesta Totonno 'o Pappagallo (The Parrot) – so-named for his beak parrot nose – in a zumpata – a kind of ritual initiation knife duel – despite the fact that his adversary sent his Mastino dog to attack Alfano. The conflict started when Pappagallo returned from prison and found Alfano in control of his former territory. Other sources mention that after the death of Cappuccio, Giuseppe Chirico, 'o Granatiere (The Grenadier), from the Porta San Gennaro neighbourhood was elected. Although the conclave of the twelve district heads had decided in favour of Chirico, another popular leader, Totonno 'o Pappagallo, with many followers, contested the election. The matter was settled in a zumpata. Chirico, due to his inexperience with weapons, was wounded at the first blow and, to save himself, threw the knife to the ground and declared himself defeated.

After his win 'o Pappagallo was elected with all the votes, but had been sentenced to go to prison. Two of the twelve districts, Vicaria and Mercato, decided that his alternate, the young Alfano, would assume effective powers. When 'o Pappagallo left prison, he was defeated in yet another duel by Alfano around the turn of the century. According to La Stampa, describing the event many years after it took place, the duel went as follows:

The clash took place near the piazza dei Vergini. Totonno had gone armed only with the knife, a fair weapon, and followed by a large mastiff, while Erricone had gone there armed with the revolver, an unfair weapon. As soon as they faced each other, Erricone drew his revolver and pointed it. Pappagallo, unperturbed, ordered the hound to pounce on his rival, and before the latter had time to fire, the dog had bitten his right hand. Erricone passed his revolver through his left hand and fired, scratching his competitor in the cheek. Pappagallo, quietly wiped the little bit of blood dripping from his cheek, and then, without a care in the world, went away, whistling.

== Camorra boss ==
Although elected head of the Camorra, due to his reluctance to accept the challenges coming from all sides, and all the inevitable quarrels that so abundantly flourished in the meetings of the bosses, he did not keep the position. Challenged by Gennaro Cuocolo, he was deposed and Luigi Fucci, known as 'O Gassusaro, became the nominal head, the capintesta, of the Camorra, while Alfano remained head of the Vicaria section. While Fucci was the nominal head, Alfano apparently remained the operational leader and was described as "a kind of president of the confederation." He had his own representative in the twelve districts next to the capintrito rionale that answered to Fucci. Alfano, freed from the care of governance, devoted himself exclusively to his lucrative trade: usury.

He worked closely with his associate Giovanni Rapi – a former primary school teacher turned gambling operator and usurer – who after a gambling stint in France opened the Unione del Mezzogiorno club in 1902 in Naples, popular among the aristocracy. Rapi and Alfano specialised in providing usury loans – at a rate of thirty per cent per week and fifty per cent per month – to merchants and gamblers, collecting extortion money, as well as procuring. He lived the good life and dressed very elegantly in Poole suits from London and Boivin shirts from Paris. He followed his rich clientele to the casinos in Nice, Montecarlo and Aix-les-Baines in the spring. Even the Naples lighting company paid protection money to prevent their wires being stolen.

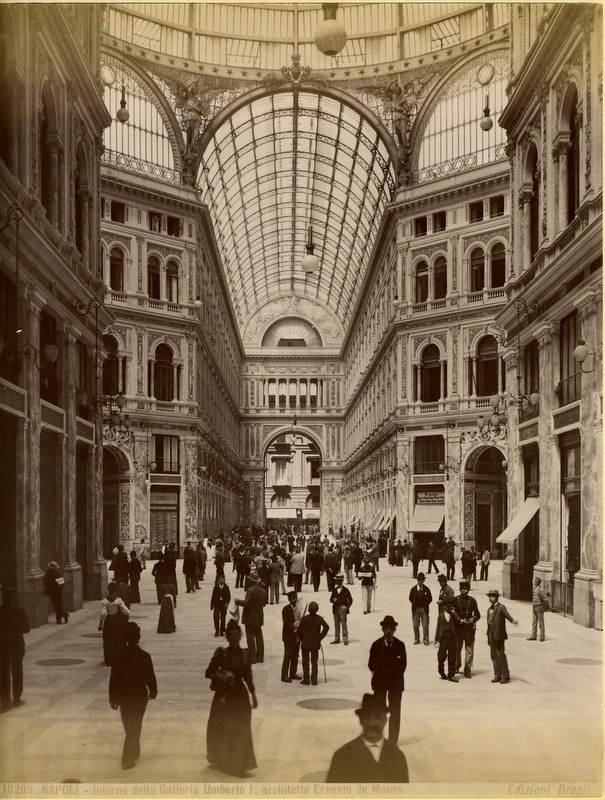
Galleria Umberto I

From the traditional ranks of criminals, a new brand of sophisticated camorristi evolved: the 'elegant camorra' or 'camorra in straw-yellow gloves' (in guanti gialli) that moved among the affluent strata of Neapolitan society and provided them the means to enjoy their vices; at a cost. These 'gentlemen mobsters' mingled with the bourgeoisie in the Galleria Umberto I, a prestigious new arcade built as part of the reconstruction programme following the cholera epidemic of 1884, where Alfano had his informal headquarters at the Caffe Fortunio. In 1902, the famous French vaudeville singer and dancer, and the vedette of the Folies Bergère, Eugénie Fougère, who was performing at the Salone Margherita a café-chantant in Naples, contacted Alfano to get back her stolen jewelry. Within a few days, Alfano tracked the thieves and restored the jewelry. The case hit the news headlines and Alfano was arrested for complicity with the thieves but was absolved.

The power of Alfano reached as far as politics. Together with his right-hand men, the priest Ciro Vitozzi and his associate Giovanni Rapi, Alfano was said to be the man behind the election in 1904 of the Count Vincenzo Ravaschieri Foschi to parliament to the detriment of the incumbent socialist deputy Ettore Ciccotti. The night before the election dissident voters were intimidated, assaulted, beaten, and sustained knife injuries by ruffians hired and encouraged by both the Camorra and the police, since the authorities equally disapproved of a socialist candidate. Alfano, Rapi and Vitozzi were seen and photographed while actively directing the vote in favour of Count Ravaschieri in the Camorra controlled district of Vicaria in which Ciccotti surprisingly had won in 1900. Ravaschieri won the 1904 election.

== Cuocolo murder ==
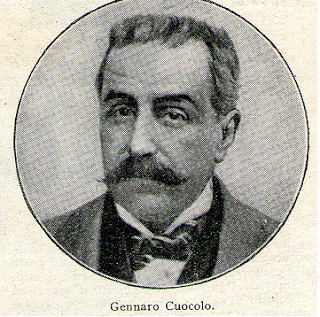
Gennaro Cuocolo

Alfano was charged with the murder of Gennaro Cuocolo and his wife, suspected of being police spies, on 6 June 1906. The murder case would develop into one of the most complicated legal cases of the early twentieth century in Italy. The police moved quickly to arrest Alfano, his brother Ciro, Giovanni Rapi, and two members of the Camorra rank and file: Gennaro Jacovitti and Gennaro Ibello. They had frequented a restaurant in Torre del Greco, in the vicinity of the Cuocolo murder. However, the investigation did not produce evidence and the suspects were released from jail 50 days later, not in the least thanks to the intervention of the priest Ciro Vitozzi, the "guardian angel" of the Camorra and Erricone's god-father.

On the basis of Vitozzi's declarations and the testimony of Giacomo Ascrittore, a regular police informer and member of the Camorra, the local police and judiciary of Naples identified Gaetano Amodeo and Tommaso De Angelis as the real killers. However, the murder investigation was transferred to the Carabinieri and delegated to Captain Carlo Fabbroni. Fabbroni accused the Naples police of inefficiency and corruption. The investigation got new momentum when Gennaro Abbatemaggio, a young camorrista and a former Carabinieri informer serving a jail sentence in Naples, testified that the decision to kill Cuocolo, suspected of being a police spy, had been taken at a meeting at the restaurant chaired by Alfano. The developments of the case and suspected police corruption were discussed in parliament several times.

== In New York ==
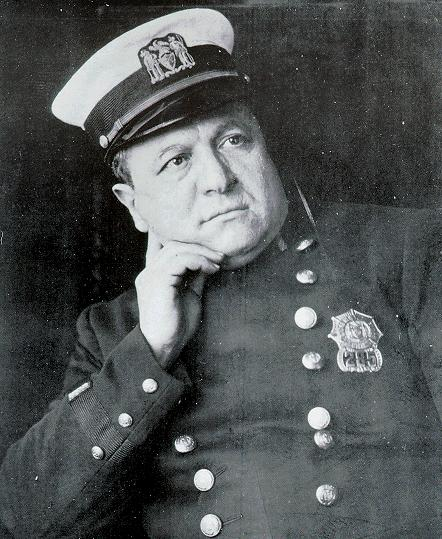
Sgt. Joe Petrosino

Meanwhile, after his release, Alfano left Naples and went from village to village to elude arrest. The Carabinieri located him in San Leucio, near Caserta, but he managed to escape. He fled to Rome, obtained a false passport and sailed for the United States from Marseille, France. He disembarked on 17 March 1907, in New York disguised as a member of the ship's crew, posing as a stoker. In New York he began to run a gambling den in the basement of 108 Mulberry Street, the heart of Manhattan's Little Italy. He became one of the primary underworld targets of police sergeant Joseph Petrosino of the New York City Police Department, who believed Alfano to be a big player in the New York branch of the Camorra.

Petrosino received anonymous letters from Neapolitans in New York that confirmed Alfano's presence in the city. He had taken lodgings at 7 Jones Street and had been given a welcome banquet with several local Camorra members in a Grand Street restaurant, a place known as the Corona di Ferro (the Iron Crown). On 17 April 1907, Petrosino and his agents raided the apartment at 108 Mulberry Street where Alfano was living and arrested him. The arrest caused a sensation in Naples. He had been convicted of a crime involving moral turpitude in Italy and was turned over to the Federal authorities. Within three days he was expelled and put on a ship to Le Havre in France, where he was picked up by the Italian police. He was put behind bars in Naples. According to some sources, Alfano was linked to the lieutenant Petrosino's murder in Palermo on 12 March 1909, which has since been attributed to the Sicilian Mafia, and to Vito Cascio Ferro in particular.

== Trial in Viterbo ==
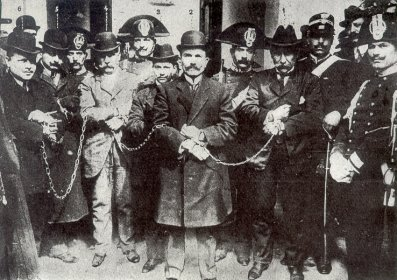
Alfano (in the middle) at the Cuocolo trial in Viterbo in 1911

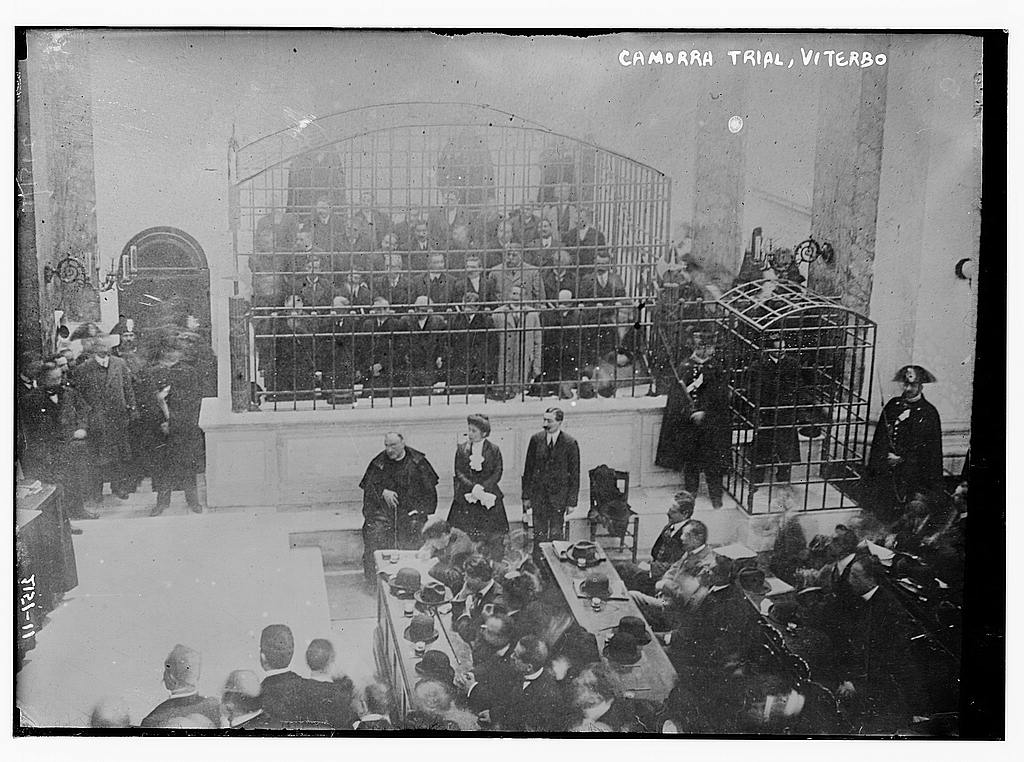
The Cuocolo trial in Viterbo. Most of the defendants are in the large cage. The three in front are (from left to right) the priest Ciro Vitozzi, Maria Stendardo, the only female defendant, and Enrico Alfano. In the small cage to the right is the crown witness Gennaro Abbatemaggio.

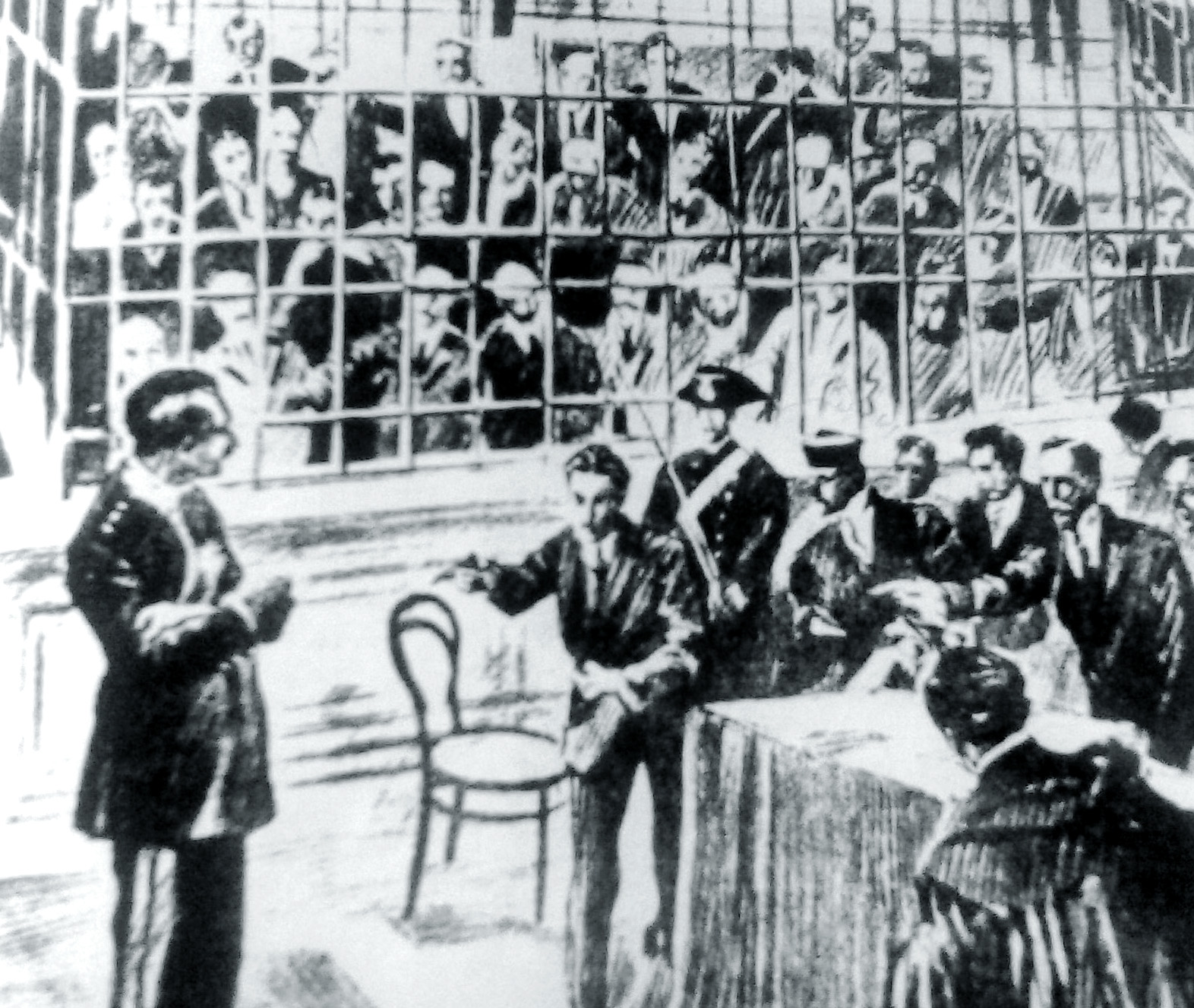
Carlo Fabbroni (left) at the trial in Viterbo

Back in Italy, Alfano stood trial at Viterbo for the Cuocolo murders. On 27 March 1909, the Assistant Public Prosecutor committed 47 persons for trial by the Court of Assizes in Naples. However, due to many attempts to corrupt the authorities and other obstacles the trial was transferred to the Court of Assizes in Viterbo, 250 kilometres from Naples and 80 kilometres north of Rome.

The often uproarious and spectacular Cuocolo trial attracted a lot of attention of newspapers and the general public both in Italy as well as in the United States, including by Pathé's Gazette. The trial was transformed from a murder trial into one against the Camorra as a whole. The hearings began in the spring of 1911 and would continue for twelve months. Fabbroni intended to use the trial to strike the final blow to the Camorra. The trial was attended by the former mayor of New York City, George B. McClellan, in whose administration Petrosino was killed.

Funds to pay the defendant's lawyers were reportedly collected in Naples and from Neapolitan restaurants in New York. The amount collected was 50,000 lire, or US$10,000, at the start of the trial. Giovanni Rapi, the Camorra's "treasurer", had an interest in a private bank in New York where the savings of immigrants were forwarded to Italy. The New York defence fund treasurer was Andrea Attanasio, also sought in connection with the Cuocolo matter.

The trial was Captain Fabbroni's finest moment. He testified in 21 hearings and his testimony filled 285 pages. He accused the police, politicians and even the judiciary of being involved with the Camorra. Alfano claimed he was innocent. "I am the victim of yellow journalism," he told the judge. "I have been ruined by the Carabinieri. The story that I have been the head of the Camorra is a legend. I was neither its head nor its tail. I admit that I have committed some excesses. What youth of my social class in Naples has not?"

== Conviction ==
After a 17-month trial, the often tumultuous proceedings ended with a guilty verdict on 8 July 1912. The defendants, including 27 leading Camorra bosses, were sentenced to a total of 354 years' imprisonment. The main defendants Enrico Alfano and Giovanni Rapi were sentenced to 30 years. The priest Vitozzi received seven years and government witness Abbatemaggio five years. The jury had been held in isolation since March 1911. The reports of the proceedings were about 40,000 pages in 63 volumes. In his last statement before the verdict, a furious Alfano accused the authorities of having killed his brother Ciro, who had died in prison. Another defendant, Gennaro De Marinis, who was sentenced to 30 years as well, slashed his throat with a piece of glass in the Court when the verdict was delivered.

After his conviction Alfano was transferred to the prison of Sassari, on the island of Sardinia. As The New York Times reported: "The convicts did all in their power to see the great criminal and pay him a kind of court, putting themselves at his disposition as subjects would to a sovereign." Many fan letters addressed to him arrived at the penitentiary, including love letters from women. In prison he took up the old family trade of shoemaking.

== Release ==
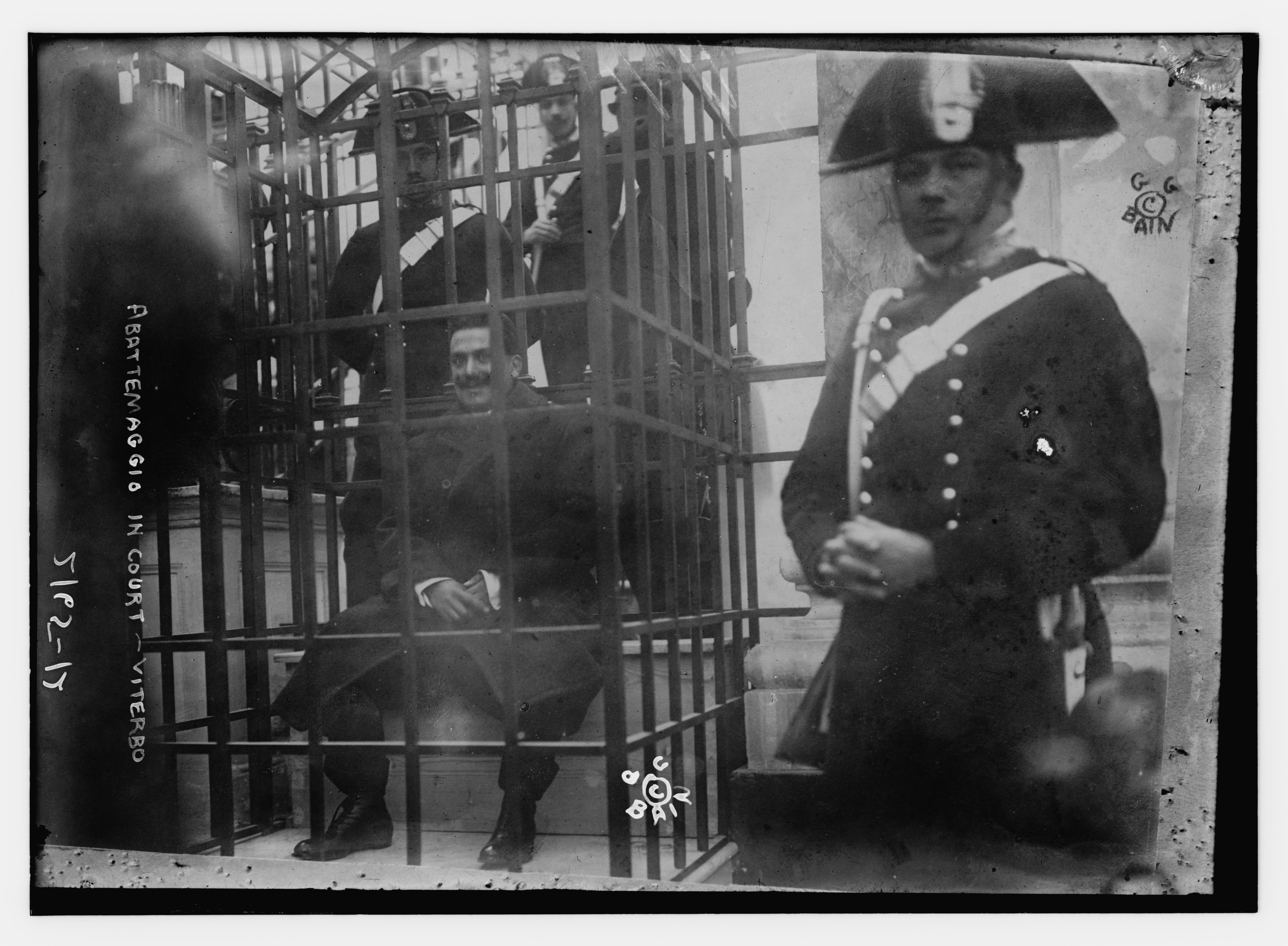
Gennaro Abattemaggio in court at the Cuocolo trial

In 1927, fifteen years later, government witness Gennaro Abbatemaggio withdrew his accusations. However, despite serious doubts of several magistrates about the legitimacy of the trial, the case was never reopened. Abbatemaggio had invented everything about a crime of which he knew nothing. Captain Fabbroni had spent 350,000 lire to pay the witnesses, according to Abbatemaggio, and he described the case as "a setup against the leaders of the Neapolitan Camorra organized by him in accordance with the collaborators of Captain Fabbroni."

In 1930, a request for pardon was made by the Neapolitan newspaper Il Mattino, which at the time of the trial had strongly supported the work of the police. Alfano's sister, Rosina Alfano, tried to convince the suspected real killer Gaetano Amodeo – who privately admitted to having been the slayer and had been identified as such by the first inquiry of the Naples police – to publicly confess the murder, which he refused to do. In subsequent years, the requests for pardon came before Benito Mussolini one by one. In his own hand, the Duce wrote on those instances: "Let action be taken individually, spacing the measures out over time."

Alfano was granted a conditional release for good behaviour on 16 October 1934, after serving 27 years of his sentence. The erstwhile head of the Camorra vanished into oblivion. He died on 9 January 1940 in Naples.

== In popular culture ==
- Forgione, Louis (1928). The Men of Silence, New York, E. P. Dutton. The book is a novelization of the Cuocolo murder and trial based on the trial records, with a foreword by Walter Littlefield, The New York Times correspondent who had reported on the case.
- The City Stands Trial (Italian: Processo alla città), a 1952 Italian drama film directed by Luigi Zampa and starring Amedeo Nazzari is based on a revisiting of the Cuocolo murders and the struggle for control of Naples by the Camorra in the early 1900s.
