= Edoardo Scarfoglio =

Italian author and journalist (1860–1917)

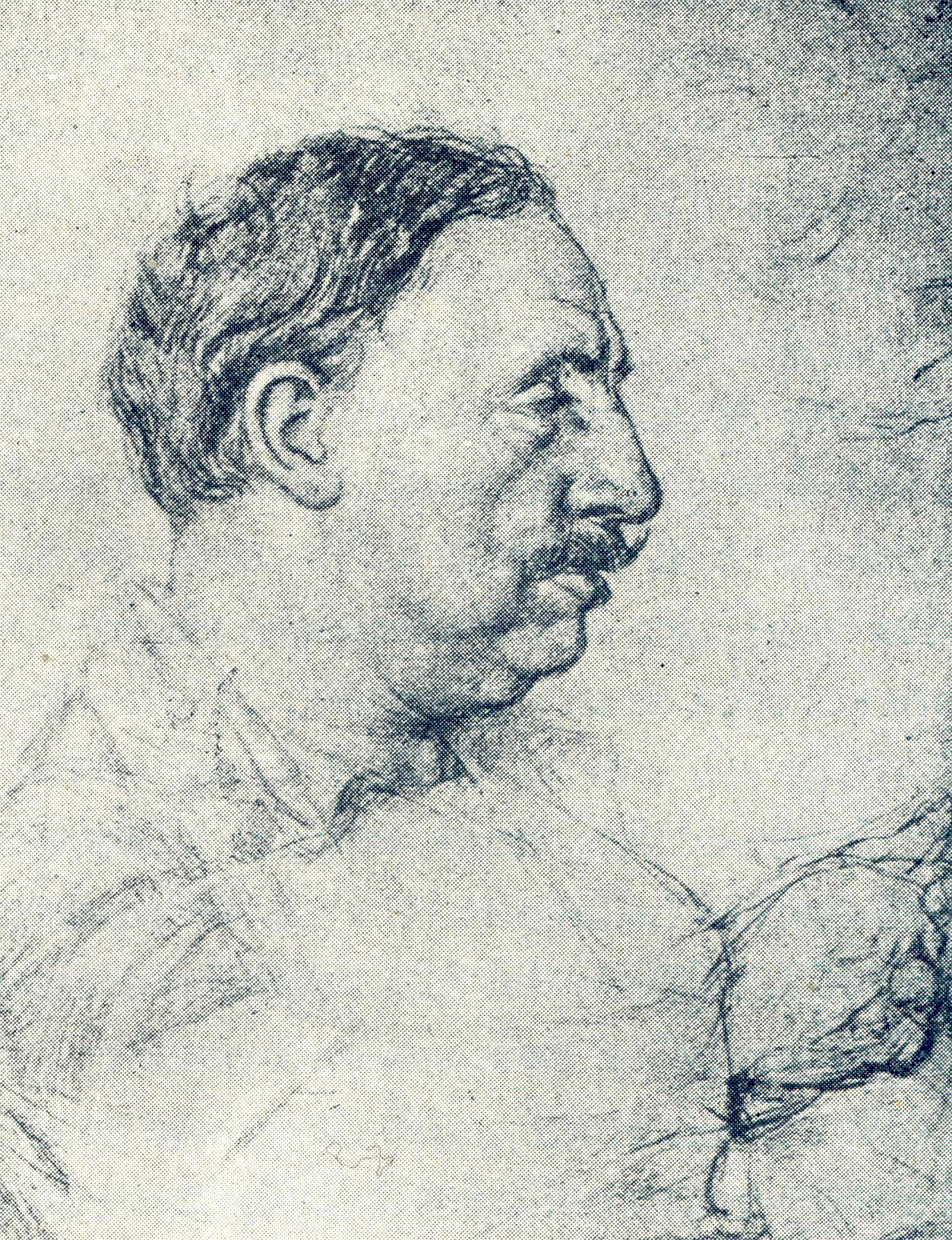
- Edoardo Scarfoglio, by Vincenzo Gemito
- Born: September 26, 1860; Paganica, Italy
- Died: October 6, 1917 (aged 57); Naples, Italy
- Occupations: Journalist; writer; newspaper editor
- Spouse: Matilde Serao (1885-1904)
- Children: Antonio Scarfoglio; Carlo Scarfoglio; Paolo Scarfoglio; Michele Scarfoglio
- Parent(s): Michele Scarfoglio; Marianna Volpe

Edoardo Scarfoglio (26 September 1860 – 6 October 1917) was an Italian author and journalist, one of the early practitioners in Italian fiction of realism, a style of writing that embraced direct, colloquial language and rejected the more ornate style of earlier Italian literature. His name is chiefly associated with the newspaper Il Mattino in Naples, which he owned and edited for many years, and still is the largest daily newspaper in the city.

== Early life and career ==
Scarfoglio was born in Paganica, in the Abruzzo region of Italy, but lived and worked in Naples much of his life. His father, Michele Scarfoglio, was a magistrate of Calabrian origin and his mother, Marianna Volpe, was of Abruzzese origin. He had a difficult school career due to his rebellious temperament and after repeating several classes at a high school in Chieti, he was sent to Rome to his uncle Carlo, to study at the prestigious Ennio Quirino Visconti Liceo Ginnasio.

He enrolled in the Faculty of Letters at the Sapienza University of Rome in 1880 and began to participate in the capital's cultural life. In 1881, he began collaborating with Cronaca Byzantina, on which authors of the calibre of Giosue Carducci, Giovanni Verga, Luigi Capuana and Gabriele D'Annunzio wrote, and, in the same year, he joined the editorial staff of Capitan Fracassa, a Roman daily founded in 1880 by Luigi Arnaldo Vassallo. Frequenting these circles was the turning point for Scarfoglio's career, both personal and professional. The editorial offices were considered privileged literary salons around which orbited the most illustrious names of the new national culture: here he met Matilde Serao, who shortly afterwards became his wife.

As a writer of fiction, his early reputation rests on the novella The Trial of Phryne, published in 1884, a retelling—set in contemporary small-town Italy—of the trial of Phryne, a Greek courtesan from the fourth century, BCE. In Scarfoglio's version, a young woman, Mariantonia, guilty of murder, is acquitted simply because she is beautiful. Scarfoglio's tale is well known even to Italians who have not actually read the novella, since it was the basis for an episode in Alessandro Blasetti's popular 1952 film Altri tempi (In Olden Days), starring Gina Lollobrigida as Phryne/Mariantonia in the eighth, and last, episode bearing the title Il processo di Frine (Phryne’s Trial).

On February 28, 1885 he married Matilde Serao, the best-known woman writer in Italy at the time, to avoid a scandal about the writer's pregnancy (later not carried to term). From marriage four children were born. Scarfoglio, however, had extramarital adventures, including an affair that lasted for about a year with Gabrielle Bessard, a French singer, who, when he decided to break off the relationship in 1894, killed herself in front of his door, leaving him the child born of their relationship. The child, Pauline, was then raised in the family. The marriage and collaboration with Serao broke down in 1904.

== Newspaper editor ==
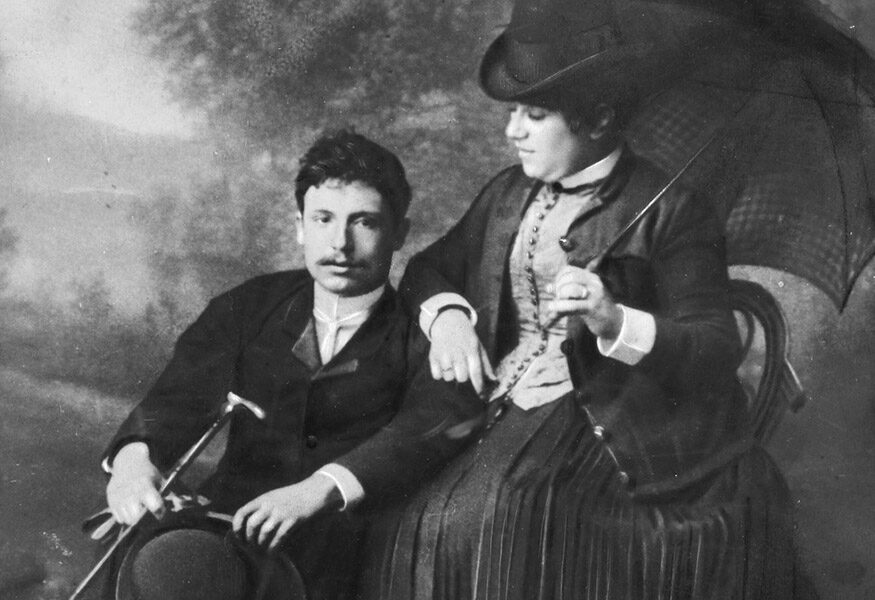
Edoardo Scarfoglio and Matilde Serao (ca. 1885)

With Serao he first founded and ran a newspaper, Il Corriere di Roma, in Rome (1886-87), the first Italian attempt to model a daily journal along the lines of the Parisian press. The paper was short lived, and after its demise Scarfoglio and Serao moved to Naples where they edited Il Corriere di Napoli in 1888. In 1892, they co-founded Il Mattino, which became the most important and most widely read daily paper of southern Italy.

Under Scarfoglio, Il Mattino did not shy away from taking sides in Neapolitan politics. During the Saredo Inquiry, that investigated corruption and bad governance in the city of Naples in 1900-1901, and uncovered an extensive political patronage system, the so-called "administrative Camorra" or "high Camorra"; the corrupt class of Neapolitan executive in charge of city governments. The newspaper acted as the mouthpiece of the Mayor of Naples Celestino Summonte, and Alberto Casale, a Liberal member of the Italian Chamber of Deputies and the local government power broker with extensive contacts in the Neapolitan underworld of the Camorra, and blasted the inquiry.

Scarfoglio had close friends among politicians from the "high Camorra", which paid for his yacht with a permanent crew of eleven. According to the socialist newspaper La Propaganda, Naples was ruled by the Casale-Summonte-Scarfoglio triad; the tip of a corrupt iceberg of officials, politicians and administrators. Scarfoglio launched frenzied attacks against the socialist newspaper and the chairman of the inquiry, Giuseppe Saredo, who was described as an evil eye, and the inquiry was compared to a pestilential disease. The Saredo inquiry confirmed the corruption and revealed that Scarfoglio had received 10,000 lire from a Belgian tramway company that operated several tram lines in the city.

In 1904 he was called by the Florio family to direct L'Ora in Palermo. He made it an international newspaper, in line with the Florio family's interests, and agreements were made to exchange information with Le Matin in Paris, the Times in London and The Sun in New York. Scarfoglio remained in Sicily until 1907, and subsequently returned to Naples and Il Mattino.

Il Mattino played a prominent role in the years-long investigation into the Cuocolo murder and subsequent trial. Scarfoglio supported the prosection's line of investigation with dozens of articles signed in particular by the newspaper's influential editor and crime reporter Ernesto Serao. At the time of trial in Viterbo in 1911-1912, he organised filming of the hearings during the day in Viterbo, had the film transported with great speed to Naples, to screen it the next evening in the public shopping gallery Galleria Umberto I, next to the newspaper office, in mute (as sound film was not yet available), with megaphone commentary by a journalist, with an enormous influx of spectators. According to the main government witness, who in 1927 retracted his incriminating statements, Scarfoglio had received 40,000 lire from the Carabinieri to support their version of the trial.

He and his wife were responsible for moving Naples into the mainstream of Italian journalism in the early twentieth century by serializing the works of writers such as D'Annunzio. As an editorialist in his own paper, Scarfoglio supported such policies as Italian expansionism in Africa and the Aegean in the 1890s. He is the father of journalists Carlo Scarfoglio and Antonio Scarfoglio. He died in Naples, following a heart attack, on 6 October 1917.

== Sources ==
- (in Italian) Barbagallo, Francesco (2010). Storia della camorra. Rome: Laterza. ISBN 978-88-420-9259-9.
- Chisholm, Hugh, ed. (1922). "Scarfoglio, Edoardo" . Encyclopædia Britannica (12th ed.). London & New York: The Encyclopædia Britannica Company.
- Dickie, John (2012). Mafia Brotherhoods: The Rise of the Italian Mafias. London: Sceptre. ISBN 978-0-340-96394-4.
- (in Italian) Iermano, Toni (2009). ""Sarebbe piaciuto a Maupassant". Mater camorra di Luigi Compagnone" (PDF). Critica Letteraria. XXVII (144): 541–566.
- (in Italian) Di Fiore, Gigi (1993). Potere camorrista: quattro secoli di malanapoli. Naples: Guida Editori. ISBN 88-7188-084-6.
