= Giovanni Ciccotti =

Italian physicist

Giovanni Ciccotti (born 19 December 1943 in Rome) is an Italian theoretical physicist whose work has contributed to molecular dynamics, nonequilibrium statistical mechanics, and computational physics.

His research has focused on methods for the simulation of complex systems, particularly in constrained dynamics, rare events, and quantum–classical dynamics. He has also contributed to the development of the international molecular simulation community, especially through his long-standing involvement with the Centre Européen de Calcul Atomique et Moléculaire (CECAM).

He has been described as a leading figure in molecular simulation and statistical mechanics.

== Early life and education ==
He grew up in post-war Rome as the fifth of six children.

His interest in physics developed during his secondary school years, following scientific orientation lectures that led him to choose physics over mathematics or engineering. His intellectual interests ranged from mathematics and the natural sciences to philosophy and history.

The cultural and political climate of the late 1960s influenced his formative years and contributed to a lasting interest in the history and epistemology of science, as well as in the broader role of science in society.

== Academic career ==
Ciccotti obtained his Laurea degree in Physics from Sapienza University of Rome in 1967.

He began his research career with a fellowship from the Italian National Research Council (CNR). He held junior professorships at the University of Lecce (1971–1973) and the University of Camerino (1973–1977), before joining Sapienza University of Rome, where he was appointed full professor in 1990 and remained until 2014.

From 2009 to 2013, he served as Professor of Computational Physics at University College Dublin.

He is Emeritus Professor at Sapienza University of Rome and at University College Dublin.

Since 2016, he has been an associated researcher at the Institute for Applied Computing of the CNR.

He has held visiting positions at several international institutions, including the University of Paris (Orsay and Paris VI), the University of Colorado Boulder, the University of Toronto, the University of Cambridge and the Free University of Berlin.

== Scientific contributions ==
=== Molecular dynamics and constrained systems ===
In 1977, together with Jean-Paul Ryckaert and Herman Berendsen, Ciccotti introduced what is now known as the SHAKE algorithm.

This work addressed the coexistence of stiff and soft degrees of freedom in molecular simulations and enabled the simulation of complex molecular systems.

In collaboration with Emily Carter, James T. Hynes, and Raymond Kapral, he contributed to constrained dynamics and to the development of the Blue Moon ensemble approach.

He later contributed, together with Eric Vanden-Eijnden, to methods for the determination of minimum free energy paths.

=== Nonequilibrium and stochastic methods ===
Together with Gianni Jacucci, Ciccotti developed early methods for computing the dynamical response in nonequilibrium molecular dynamics.

He also contributed to numerical methods for stochastic differential equations, particularly in the context of Langevin dynamics.

=== Quantum–classical dynamics ===
In collaboration with Ray Kapral and David Coker, Ciccotti studied mixed quantum–classical dynamics.

This work showed that simple quantum–classical approximations, although formally viable, tend to produce non-physical dynamics and limited numerical efficiency, while clarifying intrinsic limitations that have remained influential in subsequent research.

== Role in the scientific community ==
Ciccotti was closely associated with CECAM from the 1970s and served as its director from 1990 to 1994.

In 1985, he organized (with W. G. Hoover) a major school on molecular simulation at the Enrico Fermi International School of Physics.

== Publications ==
Ciccotti is the author of more than 200 scientific publications.

== Awards and recognition ==
Two special issues of Molecular Physics (2013 and 2025) were dedicated to him to celebrate his seventieth and eightieth birthdays.

He received the Berni Alder CECAM Award in 1999.

He was appointed Academic Professor by the Accademia dei Lincei (2005–2008).

== Other activities ==
Ciccotti co-authored L’ape e l’architetto (1976), a work on the epistemology and social role of science. The book was republished in Italian in 2011 and translated into English in 2025. He later contributed to further work in this area and co-authored Computer Meets Theoretical Physics (2020).
