= Ettore Ciccotti =

Italian politician (1863–1939)

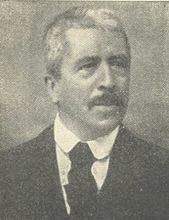

Member of the Italian Chamber of Deputies
- In office 10 June 1900 – 18 October 1904
- In office 24 March 1909 – 29 September 1919

Member of the Italian Senate
- In office 18 September 1924 (for life) – 20 May 1939 (with his death)

Personal details
- Born: 23 March 1863 Potenza, Basilicata (Italy)
- Died: 20 May 1939 (aged 76) Rome, Italy
- Party: Italian Socialist Party
- Profession: Historian, writer

Ettore Ciccotti (Potenza, 23 March 1863 - Rome, 20 May 1939) was a historian, lecturer and politician from Italy, member of both the Italian Chamber of Deputies and Italian Senate.

== Early life ==
Born into a liberal family of the lawyer Pasquale Ciccotti, a landowner and several times mayor of Potenza, he studied in the local high school. In 1879 he enrolled at the Law Faculty of the University of Naples. He became a follower of Mazzini and adhered to Italian irredentism. He had a particular interest in both ancient history and for the social problems of Southern Italy, inspired by the example of the historian Giustino Fortunato.

Ciccotti, raised in the poor southern region of Basilicata, adhered to the group of socio-political thinker's known as meridionalisti ("southernists"), aspiring to solve the economic problems of Southern Italy after the Italian unification. They claimed that the economic policies of the central government of the new state discriminated against the interests of the south while favoring those of north.

== Academic and political activist ==
In 1889, Ciccotti attended the University of Rome and gained a teaching qualification in classical antiquities. He won the competition for the ancient history chair at the Scientific-Literary Academy (Accademia scientifico-letteraria) in Milan in 1891. Meanwhile, he started to cooperate with the socialist Filippo Turati and his journal Critica Sociale. He adhered to the Italian Socialist Party (PSI), where he raised the issue of the underdevelopment of Southern Italy. His political involvement caused him the hostility of the Milanese conservatives, and in 1897 he lost his position at the Academy.

He was appointed professor of ancient history at the University of Pavia, but his attacks on the government and solidarity for the workers on the occasion of the tragic events in Milan in May 1898 earned him an arrest warrant for subversive incitement. He went into exile, taking refuge in Geneva (Switzerland), hosted by Maffeo Pantaleoni. Here he met Vilfredo Pareto and the German social-democrat August Bebel, and wrote a report on the events in Milan, The revolt of Milan: Notes of a refugee, but lost his job at Pavia.

As a historian, Ciccotti was the first to give a Marxist economic account of the decline of slavery in the Roman Empire, in contrast to religious-ethical explanations in his book Il tramonto della schiavitu nel mondo antico (The Sunset of Slavery in the Ancient World), published in 1899. Economic changes rendered slavery expensive and inefficient, and doomed it to extinction.

== Political career ==
In June 1900, he was elected in the Italian Chamber of Deputies (1900-1904) in the Vicaria district of Naples, upsetting the traditional electoral alliance between local politicians and the Camorra. In 1904, he lost his seat due to active campaigning of the Camorra against him. Camorra boss Enrico Alfano was said to be the man behind the election in 1904 of the Count Vincenzo Ravaschieri Fieschi who had the support of Prime Minister Giovanni Giolitti. The night before the election dissident voters were intimidated, assaulted, beaten, and sustained knife injuries by ruffians hired and encouraged by both the Camorra and the police, since the authorities equally disapproved of a socialist candidate.

He was re-elected in 1909 and remained a Deputy until September 1919. Meanwhile, Ciccotti initiated the translation in Italian of the major works of the Socialist theorists Karl Marx, Friedrich Engels and Ferdinand Lassalle. In the decade before the First World War, he gradually distanced himself more and more from the official line of the Socialist Party, although he kept on contributing to the socialist newspaper Avanti!. He criticized the party, which he considered to be too much focused on the problems of the "Northern", industrialist working man, and too little inclined to understand the problems of the impoverished rural populace of the South. Ciccotti defined the prejudices against southern Italians as the anti-Semitism of Italy. In contrast with the PSI, he was in favour of an Italian intervention in the First World War.

== Senator and death ==
His pro-war stance and dislike of the liberal Giovanni Giolitti – Ciccotti called Giolittianism the "death of political life" –, and in opposition to the post-war revolutionary movements, he looked sympathetically at the rising Fascism and its leader Benito Mussolini. "In today's evident scarcity of political personalities, Mussolini is the one that more than any other, if not the only one, can deserve this name," Ciccotti wrote in September 1922.

In September 1924, he was rewarded with a seat for life in the Italian Senate. He opposed the move to authoritarian rule of Mussolini, but did not resign. He mainly dedicated his time to study history. In 1931, when demanded to pledge an oath of allegiance to the Fascist regime, Ciccotti initially protested, but eventually took the oath all the same. Finally he opposed, and openly, to the dictatorship of Mussolini when he sensed that the regime was heading to the adventure of a war, which he considered the inevitable conclusion of authoritarian and populist regimes. He died in Rome on 20 May 1939 at the age of 76.
