= Swaggering =

Ostentatious style of walking with an arrogant manner

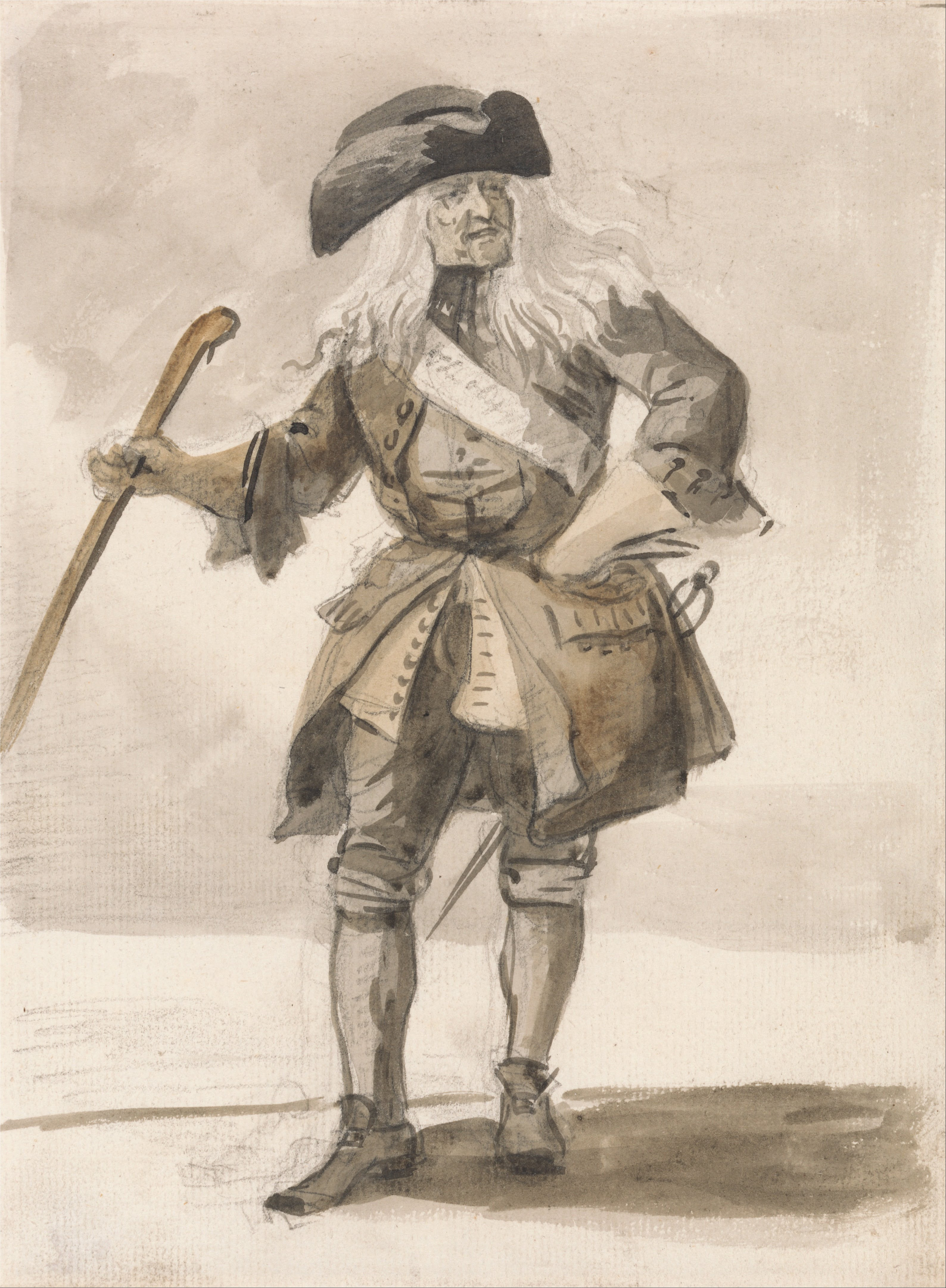
A Man Swaggering — one of twelve London Cries by Paul Sandby which were drawn from life and published in 1760.

Swaggering is an ostentatious style of walking with an extravagant manner. The exact gait will vary with personality and fashion but it is generally more of a loose, rolling style than a stiff strut. The feet will be kept apart rather than following each other in line and the more swaggering the gait, the greater the lateral distance between them. Studies have found that people are able to determine sexual orientation from such cues and a shoulder-swagger was perceived as a heterosexual orientation.

Among London cockneys, swaggering was stylised as the coster walk which became the dance craze of the Lambeth walk. Among African-Americans, it is known as a jive-ass walk or pimp walk. The actor John Wayne was known for his swaggering walk which became a distinctive element of his screen image.

A cane may be used as a walking stick as part of the performance. In the military, this became stylised as the swagger stick — useless as a support and just used for gesturing and prodding.

Portraits which are ostentatiously posed in the grand manner are known as swagger portraits. The Tate Gallery held an exhibition of these in 1992, featuring the work of William Dobson, Anthony van Dyck and Peter Lely.

== Adaptations ==
The word swagger has been adapted into "swag," a word referring to confidence and cool style, which has been popularised via hip-hop stars such as Jay-Z and Soulja Boy.

== See also ==
- Cool (aesthetic)
- Hypermasculinity
- Manspreading
- Military parade
- Power posing
