= Matilde Serao =

Italian journalist and novelist (1856–1927)

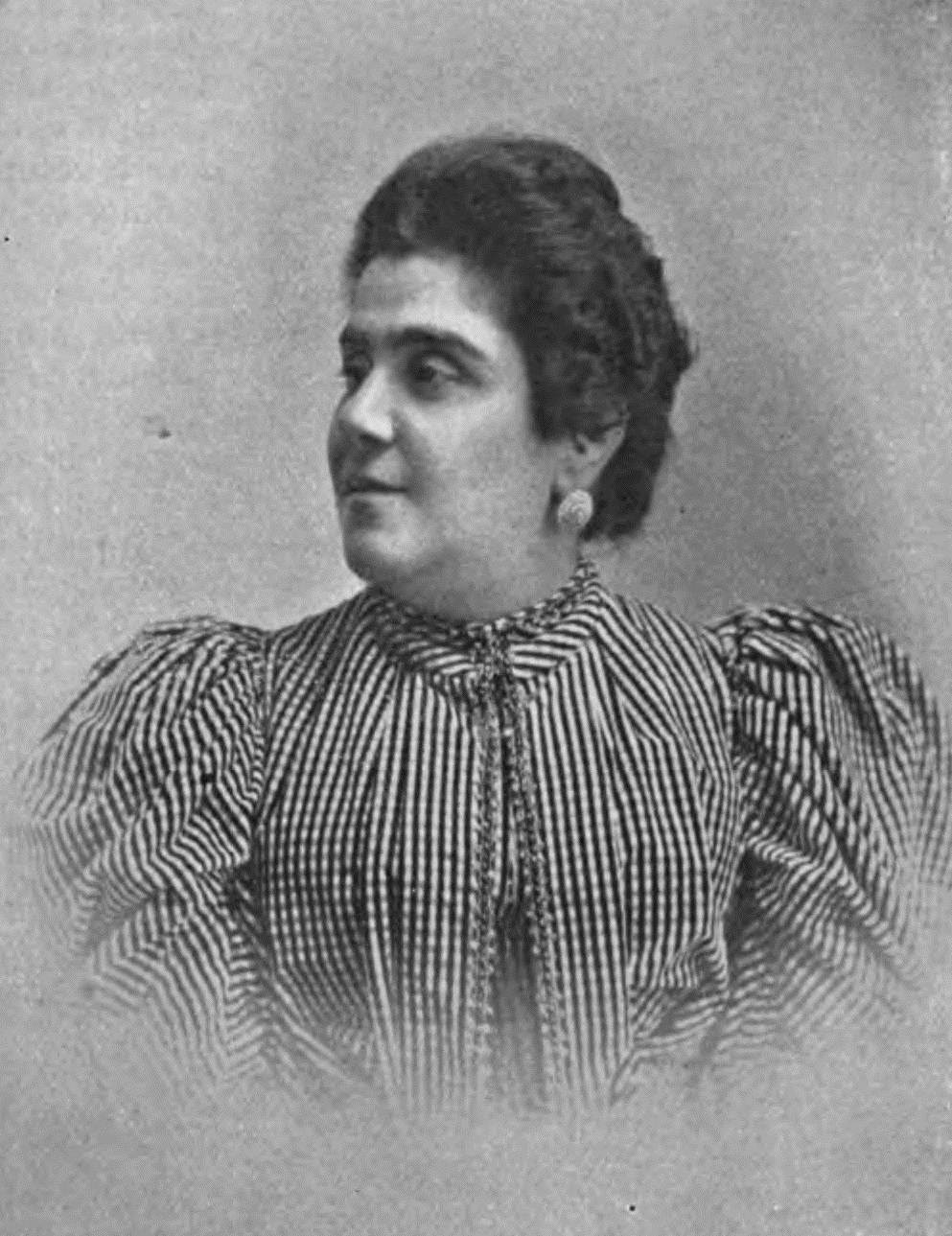
- Born: 14 March 1856; Patras, Greece
- Died: 25 July 1927 (aged 71); Naples, Kingdom of Italy
- Spouse: Edoardo Scarfoglio

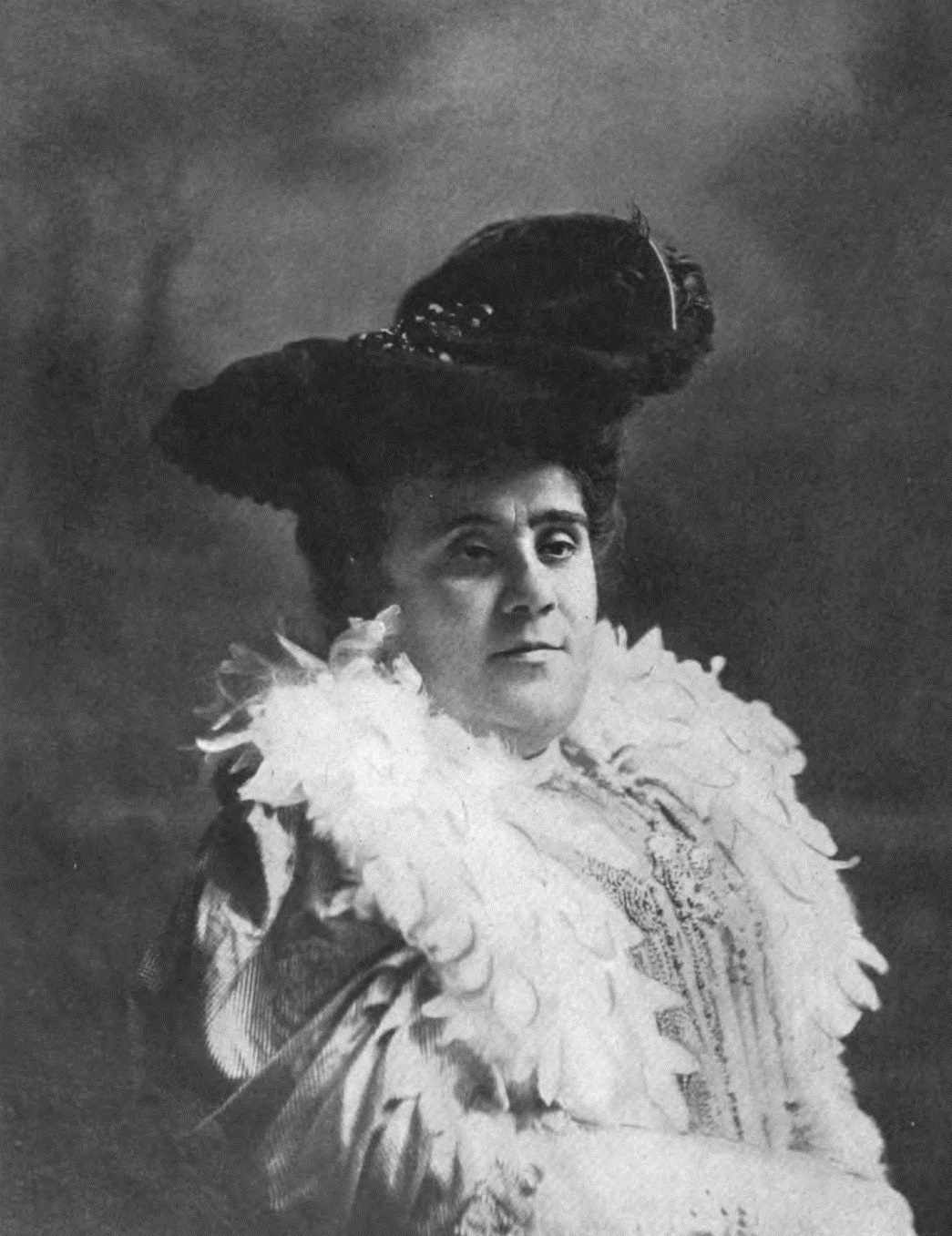
Matilde Serao, by "Rossi"

Matilde Serao (Italian pronunciation: [maˈtilde seˈraːo]; Greek: Ματθίλδη Σεράο; 14 March 1856 – 25 July 1927) was an Italian journalist, novelist, publisher and newspaper editor. She was the first woman appointed to edit an Italian newspaper, Il Corriere di Roma and later Il Giorno. Serao was also the co-founder and editor of the Naples-based newspaper Il Mattino, and the author of several novels. She never won the Nobel Prize in Literature despite being nominated on six occasions.

== Biography ==
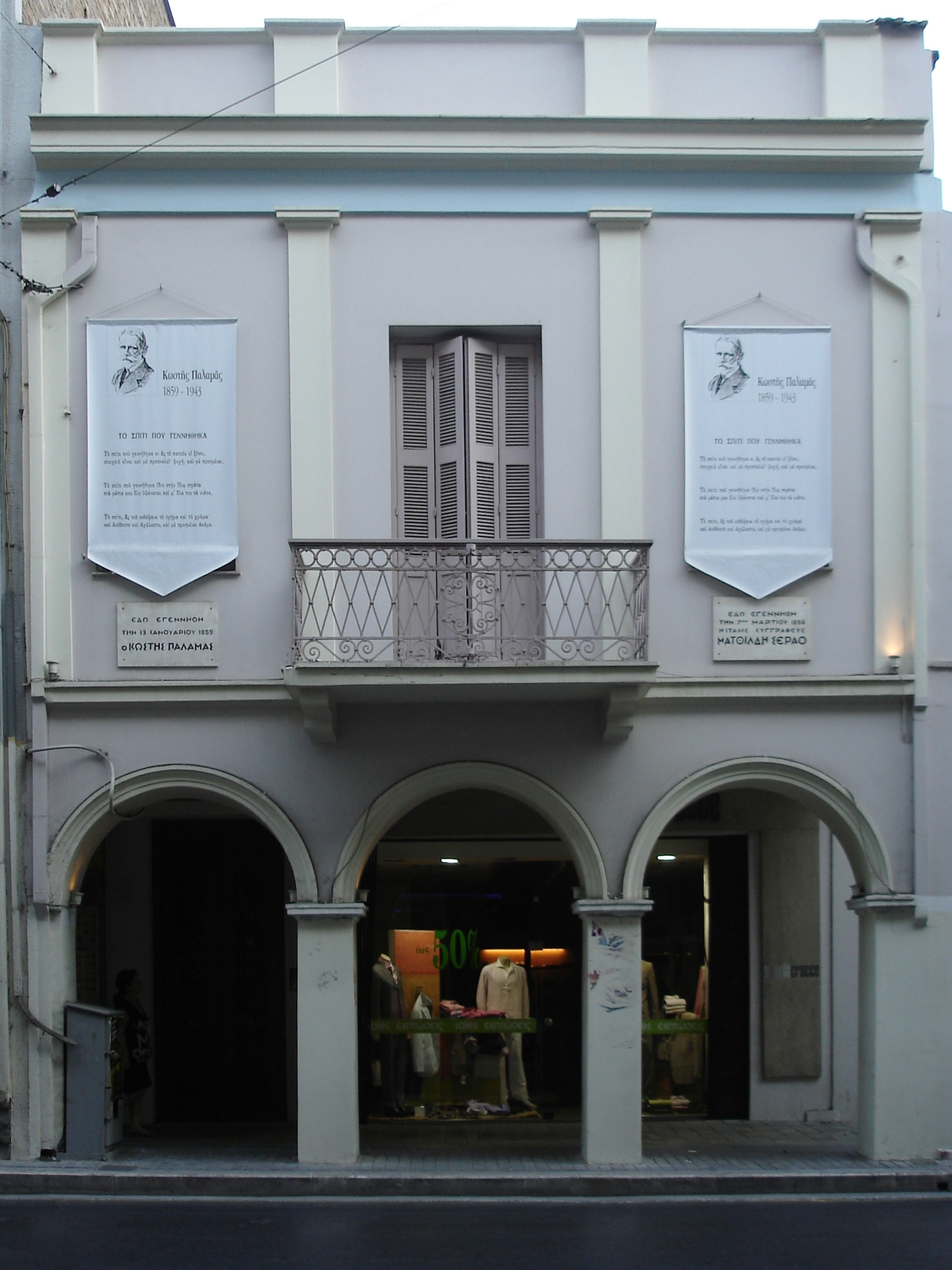
The house in Patras where Matilde Serao and Kostis Palamas were born

Serao was born in Patras, Greece to an Italian father, Francesco Serao, and a Greek mother, Paolina Borely (or Bonelly). Her father, a journalist, had emigrated to Greece from Naples for political reasons.

In 1860, the family moved back to Italy, first to Carinola and then to Naples. Serao grew up in poverty and worked as a schoolmistress, an experience later described in the preface to her collection of short stories Leggende Napolitane (Napoletan Legends, 1881). She first gained notoriety after publishing short stories in Il Piccolo, a newspaper edited by Rocco de Zerbi. Her first novel, Fantasia (Fantasy, 1883), was well received, and Serao was hailed as an author capable of writing with sentiment and analytical subtleties.

Serao spent the years between 1880 and 1886 in Rome, where she wrote five volumes of short stories and novels, all dealing with the struggles of ordinary people, and distinguished by great accuracy of observation and depth of insight: Cuore infermo (1881), Fior di passione (1883), La conquista di Roma (1885), La Virtù di checchina (1884), and Piccole anime (1883).

In 1885 Serao and her husband, Edoardo Scarfoglio, founded Il Corriere di Roma, the first attempt to model a daily journal along the lines of the Parisian press in Italy. The paper was short-lived, and after its demise, Serao moved to Naples, where she edited Il Corriere di Napoli. In 1892, she co-founded Il Mattino with her husband, which became the most important and most widely read daily paper of southern Italy. In 1904 she helped establishing the national newspaper "Il Giorno", where she would work until her death. The high demands placed by a career in journalism and publishing did not limit Serao's literary activity; between 1890 and 1902, she wrote eight novels – Il paese di cuccagna, Il ventre di Napoli, Addio amore, All'erta sentinella, Castigo, La ballerina, Suor Giovanna della Croce and Paese di Gesù. All were praised for Serao's ability to capture the personal traits of her characters and render them with sensitive power and sympathetic breadth of spirit. Although most of Serao's novels have been translated into English, a few works are only available in Italian. The late nineteenth century English novelist George Gissing writes in his diary that between November 1894 and early January 1895 he read three of Serao's novels, "Gli Amanti", "Cuore Infermo" and "Fantasia", in the original Italian.

Although Serao was a contributor to the Fascist women's magazine, Lidel, she would later be a signatory of the 1925 Manifesto of the Anti-Fascist Intellectuals.

Serao died in 1927 in Naples.

== Publications ==
=== Novels and novellas ===
- Cuore infermo ("Sick Heart", 1881)
- Fantasia ("Fantasy", 1883)
- Pagina azzurra ("Blue Page", 1883)
- La virtù di Checchina ("The Virtue of Checchina", 1884)
- Il ventre di Napoli ("The Belly of Naples", 1884)
- La conquista di Roma ("The Conquest of Rome", 1885)
- Le vie dolorose ("The Sorrowful Ways", 1886)
- Il romanzo della fanciulla ("A Girl's Novel", 1886; revised in 1895 as "Telegraphs of the State: Novel for Ladies" [Telegrafi dello Stato. Romanzo per le signore])
- Vita e avventure di Riccardo Joanna ("Life and Adventures of Riccardo Joanna", 1887)
- Fior di passione ("Flower of Passion", 1889)
- Addio, amore! ("Goodbye, Love!", 1890)
- Il paese di cuccagna ("The Land of Cockayne", 1891)
- Piccolo romanzo ("Little Novel", 1891)
- Castigo ("Punishment", 1893)
- Gli amanti. Pastelli ("Lovers: Pastels", 1894)
- Le Marie (1894)
- L'indifferente ("The Indifferent", 1896)
- L'infedele ("The Infidel", 1897)
- Donna Paola (1897)
- Nel sogno ("In the Dream", 1897)
- Nel paese di Gesù. Ricordi di un viaggio in Palestina ("In the Country of Jesus: Memories of a Trip to Palestine", 1898)
- Storia di una monaca ("Story of a Nun", 1898)
- La ballerina ("The Ballerina", 1899)
- Come un fiore ("Like a Flower", 1900)
- Saper vivere. Norme di buona creanza ("Knowing How to Live: Norms of Good Manners", 1900)
- L'anima semplice. Suor Giovanna della Croce ("The Simple Soul: Sister Giovanna della Croce", 1901)
- La Madonna e i santi. Nella fede e nella vita ("The Madonna and the Saints: In Faith and Life", 1901)
- Storia di due anime ("Story of Two Souls", 1904)
- Tre donne ("Three Women", 1904)
- Dopo il perdono ("After the Pardon", 1905)
- Sterminator Vesevo. Diario dell'eruzione aprile 1906 ("Exterminator Vesevo: Diary of the Eruption, April 1906", 1906)
- Il giornale ("The Newspaper", 1906)
- La leggenda di Napoli ("The Legend of Naples", 1906)
- Sognando ("Dreaming", 1906)
- Evviva la vita! ("Cheers to Life!", 1908)
- Cristina (1908)
- I capelli di Sansone ("The Hair of Samson", 1909)
- San Gennaro nella leggenda e nella vita ("San Gennaro in Legend and Life", 1909)
- Il pellegrino appassionato ("The Passionate Pilgrim', 1911)
- La mano tagliata ("The Cut Hand", 1912)
- Ella non rispose ("She Did Not Answer", 1914)
- Parla una donna. Diario femminile di guerra, maggio 1915-marzo 1916 ("A Woman Speaks: Women's War Diary, May 1915–March 1916", 1916)
- Temi il leone ("Fear the Lion", 1916)
- La vita è così lunga! ("Life is So Long!", 1918)
- La moglie di un grand'uomo, ed altre novelle scelte ("The Wife of a Great Man, and Other Short Stories", 1919)
- Mors tua.... Romanzo in tre giornate ("Mors tua.... Novel in Three Days", 1926)
- Via delle cinque lune ("Street of the Fifth Moon", 1941; posthumous)
- L'occhio di Napoli ("The Eye of Naples", 1962; posthumous)
- I mosconi ("The Blowflies", 1974; posthumous)
- L'ebbrezza, il servaggio e la morte ("Drunkenness, Servitude and Death, 1977; posthumous)

=== Short Story Collections ===
- Dal vero ("From Life", 1879)
- Raccolta minima ("Minimum Collection", 1881)
- Leggende napoletane ("Neapolitan Legends", 1881)
- Piccole anime ("Little Souls", 1883)
- Racconti napoletani ("Neapolitan Tales", 1889)
- Le amanti ("The Lovers", 1894)
- Novelle sentimentali ("Sentimental Novels", 1902)

=== Essays ===
- L'anima dei fiori ("The Soul of Flowers", 1903)
- Santa Teresa (1904)

=== Other writings ===
- L'Italia a Bologna: Lettere ("Italy in Bologna: Letters", 1888)
- Lettere d'amore: Il perché della morte ("Love Letters: The Reason for Death", 1901)
- Lettere d'una viaggiatrice ("Letters of a Traveller", 1908)
- Vita e scuola: Libro per la quarta classe elementare ("Life and School: Book for the Fourth Elementary Class", 1912; with Camillo Alberici)

=== Works translated in English ===
- Fantasy (1890)
- Farewell Love (1890)
- The Ballet Dancer and On Guard (1901)
- In the Country of Jesus (1901)
- The Land of Cockayne (1901)
- The Conquest of Rome (1902)
- After the Pardon (1909)
- The Desire of Life (1911)
- Souls Divided (1919)
- The Severed Hand (1925)
- The Harvest (1928)
- Heart Conditions (2018)
