= 1935 in Italy =

- Decades: 1910s; 1920s; 1930s; 1940s; 1950s
- See also: History of Italy; Timeline of Italian history; List of years in Italy

Events from the year 1935 in Italy

== Events ==
- Il Liberatore, Italian language underground publication is founded.

== Establishments ==
- A.S.D. Roccella
- Aeronautica Umbra
- Azienda Italiana Petroli Albanesi
- Brondi
- Farmitalia
- Frejus (cycling team)
- Intrepido
- Istituto Marangoni
- Velodromo Vigorelli

== Births ==
- 9 January – Manlio De Angelis, actor (d. 2017)
- 11 January – Giampiero Cotti Cometti, geographer (d. 2009)
- 12 January – Margherita Rinaldi, operatic soprano (d. 2023)
- 13 January – Mauro Forghieri, mechanical engineer (d. 2022)
- 15 January – Luigi Radice, football player and manager (d. 2018)
- 19 January – Pupetta Maresca, gangster (d. 2021)
- 31 January – Lorenzo Calafiore, wrestler (d. 2011)
- 3 February – Franco Reviglio, politician (d. 2025)
- 27 February – Mirella Freni, operatic soprano (d. 2020)
- 30 March – Giuseppe Frigo, judge (d. 2019)
- 22 April - Fiorenza Cossotto, operatic mezzo-soprano
- 13 May - Luciano Benetton, entrepreneur, owner of Benetton Group
- 26 June
  - Carlo Facetti, racing driver
  - Sandro Riminucci, basketball player
- 28 June – Nicola Tempesta, judoka
- 30 June – Valentino Gasparella, track cyclist
- 6 October – Bruno Sammartino, wrestler (d. 2018)
- 12 October – Luciano Pavarotti, operatic tenor (d. 2007)
- 26 October – Renato Casaro, poster artist (d. 2025)
- 28 October – Giancarlo Ghirardi, physicist (d. 2018)
- 22 December – Pippo Caruso, composer, conductor and music arranger (d. 2018)

== Deaths ==
- 5 January – Pietro Bonilli, Roman Catholic priest and blessed (b. 1841)
- 23 April – Lorenzo Schioppa, Roman Catholic prelate (b. 1871)
- 17 May – Antonia Mesina, Roman Catholic laywoman, martyr and blessed (b. 1919)
- 7 August – Luigi Razza, journalist and fascist politician (b. 1892)
- 3 December – Antonino Calcagnadoro, painter (b. 1876)
