= 1930 in Italy =

- Decades: 1910s; 1920s; 1930s; 1940s; 1950s
- See also: History of Italy; Timeline of Italian history; List of years in Italy

Events from the year 1930 in Italy.

== Incumbents ==
- King: Victor Emmanuel III
- Prime Minister: Benito Mussolini

== Events ==
- 21 November: A flying boat airliner I-RONY, operating on a passenger flight for Società Anonima Navigazione Aerea (SANA), disappears over the Mediterranean Sea during a flight from Barcelona, Spain, to Marseille, France; all six people on board are lost.

== Births ==
- 6 January: Alfonso Brescia, film director (d. 2001)
- 19 January: Pellegrino Tomaso Ronchi, Roman Catholic prelate (d. 2018)
- 11 February: Flaminia Jandolo, actress (d. 2019)
- 6 March: Amos Cardarelli, Italian footballer (d. 2018)
- 25 April: Ugo Crescenzi, politician (d. 2017)
- 31 July: Nino Cristofori, politician (d. 2015)
- 21 August: Filippo Illuminato, partisan, Gold Medal of Military Valour (d. 1943)
- 6 September: Daniele Barioni, operatic tenor
- 23 September: Edda Bresciani, Egyptologist
- 29 September: Cesare Barbetti, actor (d. 2006)
- 8 October: Cosetta Greco, actress (d. 2002)
- 19 October: Lino Bortolo Belotti, Roman Catholic prelate (d. 2018)
- 3 December: Francesco Perrone, long-distance runner (d. 2020)
- 6 December: Carlo Reali, actor, voice actor and film editor
- 14 December: Rosanna Carteri, operatic soprano (d. 2020)

== Deaths ==
- 18 January:Tommaso Dal Molin, aviator (b. 1902)
- 3 February: Michele Bianchi, revolutionary syndicalist leader (b. 1883)
- 14 February: Salvatore Catalanotte, Sicilian-born US mobster (b. 1893)
- 15 February: Giulio Douhet, general and air power theorist (b. 1869)
- 14 June – Enrico Millo, admiral and politician (b. 1865)
- 30 June: Francesco Saverio Merlino, lawyer, anarchist activist and theorist of libertarian socialism (b. 1856)
- 1 September: Luigi Cangiullo, Olympic diver (b. 1897)
- 9 October: Enrico Forlanini, engineer, inventor and aeronautical pioneer (b. 1848)
- 30 October: Federico Andreotti, painter (b. 1847)
- 5 November: Luigi Facta, politician, 26th Prime Minister of Italy (b. 1861)
