= 1928 in Italy =

- Decades: 1900s; 1910s; 1920s; 1930s; 1940s
- See also: History of Italy; Timeline of Italian history; List of years in Italy

Events during the year 1928 in Italy.

== Incumbents ==
- Monarch: Victor Emmanuel III
- Prime Minister: Benito Mussolini

== Events ==
- 12 April – A bomb, directed against Italian Fascist leader Benito Mussolini, kills 18 people at the Milan Trade Fair.
- 24 May – The airship Italia reaches the North Pole, with expedition leader Umberto Nobile on board. The ship crashes on its return journey.
- 24 June – Umberto Nobile and survivors of the crash of the airship Italia are rescued by the crew of a Swedish aeroplane.
- 2 August – Italy and Ethiopia sign the Italo-Ethiopian Treaty.

== Births ==
- 2 January – Alberto Zedda, conductor and musicologist (died 2017)
- 9 January – Domenico Modugno, singer, songwriter, actor and politician (died 1994)
- 5 June – Umberto Maglioli, racing driver (died 1999)
- 6 June – Elio Sgreccia, cardinal (died 2019)
- 29 June – Alfredo Biondi, politician and lawyer (died 2020)
- 4 July – Giampiero Boniperti, footballer (died 2021)
- 26 July – Francesco Cossiga, 8th President of Italy (died 2010)
- 13 September – Franzo Grande Stevens, lawyer (died 2025)
- 16 October – Nando Gazzolo, actor (died 2015)
- 22 December
  - Piero Angela, writer, journalist and television presenter
  - Luisa Massimo, pediatrician (died 2016)

== Deaths ==
- 28 February – Armando Diaz, 66, general, Marshal of Italy
- 31 March – Medardo Rosso, 70, sculptor
- 25 May (lost in the crash of the airship Italia)
  - Aldo Pontremoli, 32, physicist
  - Renato Alessandrini, 37, explorer
- 17 July – Giovanni Giolitti, 85, 13th Prime Minister of Italy
