= 2019 in Italy =

- Decades: 1990s; 2000s; 2010s; 2020s; 2030s
- See also: History of Italy; Timeline of Italian history; List of years in Italy

The following is a list of events from the year 2019 in Italy.

== Incumbents ==
- President: Sergio Mattarella
- Prime Minister: Giuseppe Conte

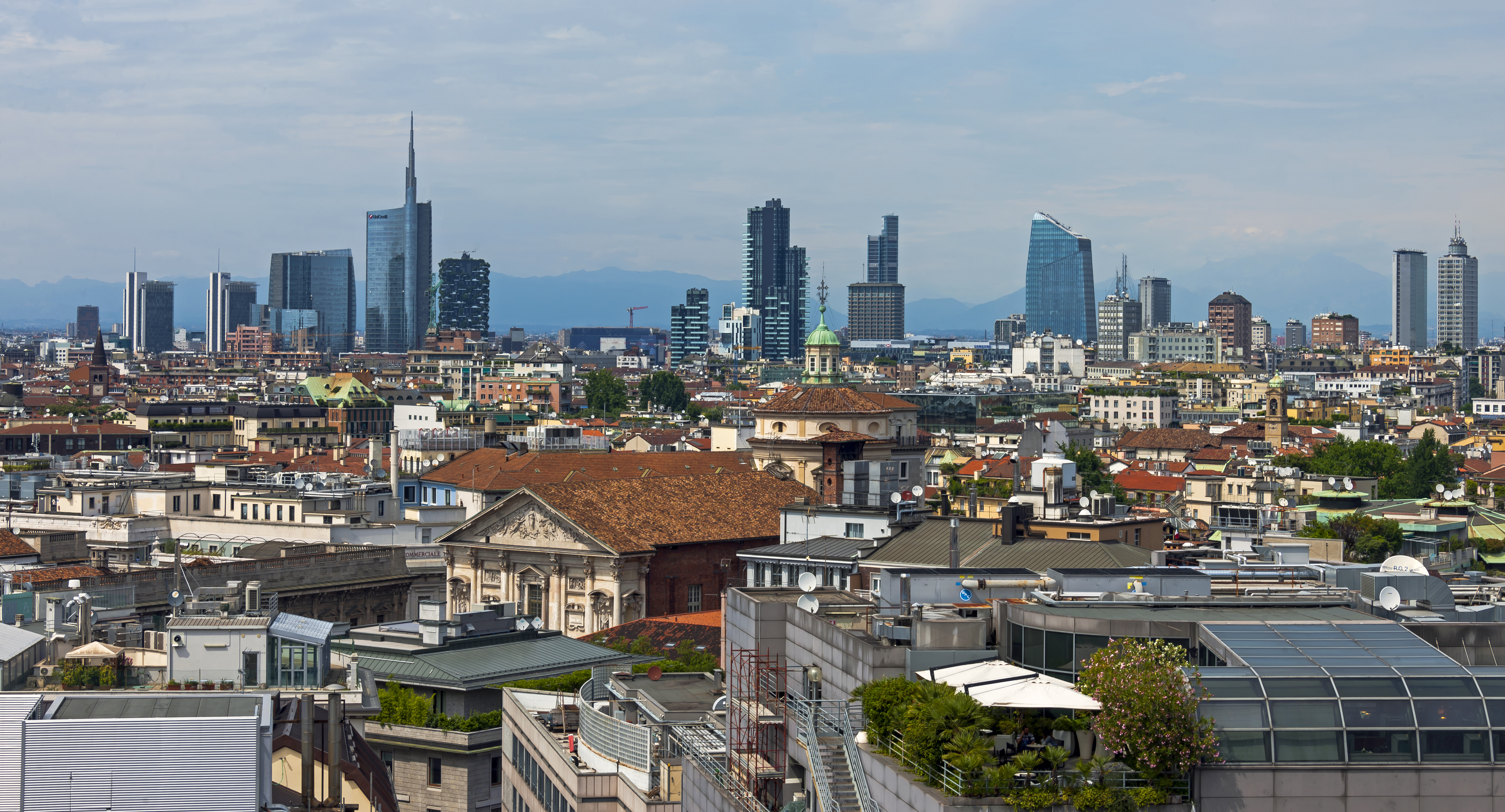
Aerial view of Milan

== Events ==
- 5-9 February – The 69th Sanremo Music Festival takes place in Sanremo, won by Alessandro Mahmood with "Soldi," who goes on to represent Italy at Eurovision 2019.
- 14-17 February – The 2019 Italian Basketball Cup is held in Florence. Vanoli Cremona win the tournament for the first time, defeating New Basket Brindisi 83–74 in the final.
- 1 March-1 September – The 22nd Triennial is held in Milan.
- 8 March – Paolo Savona, Minister of European Affairs, resigns amid tensions over EU budget policy.
- 31 March – Several tens of thousands of people march in support of the ultraconservative World Congress of Families on Sunday, on the final day of their conference in northern Italy.
- 11 May – The 58th Venice Biennale opens, featuring the central exhibition May You Live in Interesting Times curated by Ralph Rugoff.
- 24 June – The International Olympic Committee awards the 2026 Winter Olympics to Milan and Cortina d'Ampezzo, beating Stockholm-Åre.
- 29 June – Sea-Watch captain Carola Rackete is arrested after docking in Lampedusa against government orders to disembark 40 rescued migrants.
- 3-14 July – Naples hosts the 2019 Summer Universiade, with opening and closing ceremonies at the Stadio San Paolo.
- 7 July – Lorenzo Fontana becomes Minister of European Affairs, succeeding Paolo Savona.
- 24 July – The new Mayor of Predappio announces plans to open Mussolini crypt to the public all year round. Mr Canali said he wanted to promote the tomb as a tourist attraction to boost the local economy.
- 9 August – The deputy prime minister and leader of the League Matteo Salvini calls for new elections, and announces a no-confidence vote on the government backed by his party in a coalition with the Five Star Movement.
- 21 August – Prime Minister Giuseppe Conte resigns.
- 25 August – Elisa Pomarelli, 28, is murdered by Massimo Sebastiani in Carpaneto Piacentino.
- 28 August-7 September – The 76th Venice International Film Festival takes place at Venice Lido.
- 4 September – The Conte II Cabinet is sworn in.
- 8 September – Charles Leclerc wins the Italian Grand Prix, marking Ferrari's winning return at Monza after nine years.
- 10 September – Hillary Clinton visits the collateral exhibition HILLARY: The Hillary Clinton Emails at Despar Teatro Italia during the 58th Venice Biennale.
- 27 September – Over one million people join the September 2019 climate protests in 180 cities across Italy as part of the Global Week for Future.
- 27 October – The centre-right coalition composed of Salvini's League, far-right Brothers of Italy and Berlusconi's Forza Italia wins the 2019 Umbrian regional election, becoming the first centre-right government in Umbria in more than 50 years.
- 12 November – Venice is hit by its highest tide in over 50 years, reaching 187 cm, causing severe flooding that damages historic sites including St Mark's Basilica.
- 12 – 21 December – The 2019 Winter Deaflympics are held in Province of Sondrio for nine days.

== Deaths ==
=== January ===
- 2 January – Michele Caccavale, politician, Deputy (b. 1947).
- 6 January – Angelo Ziccardi, politician, Senator (b. 1928).
- 7 January – Alfredo Arpaia, politician, Deputy (b. 1940).
- 9 January
  - Fernando Aiuti, immunologist and politician (b. 1935).
  - Paolo Paoloni, actor (b. 1929).
- 10 January – Erminio Boso, politician, Senator (b. 1945).
- 19 January – Mario Bertoncini, composer, pianist, and music educator (b. 1932).
- 20 January – Evloghios, Orthodox bishop, Primate of the Holy Synod of Milan (b. 1935).
- 21 January – Giuseppe Minardi, racing cyclist (b. 1928).
- 25 January
  - Vigilio Mario Olmi, Roman Catholic prelate, Auxiliary Bishop of Brescia 1986–2003 (b. 1927)
  - Renzo Pigni, politician (b. 1925).

=== February ===
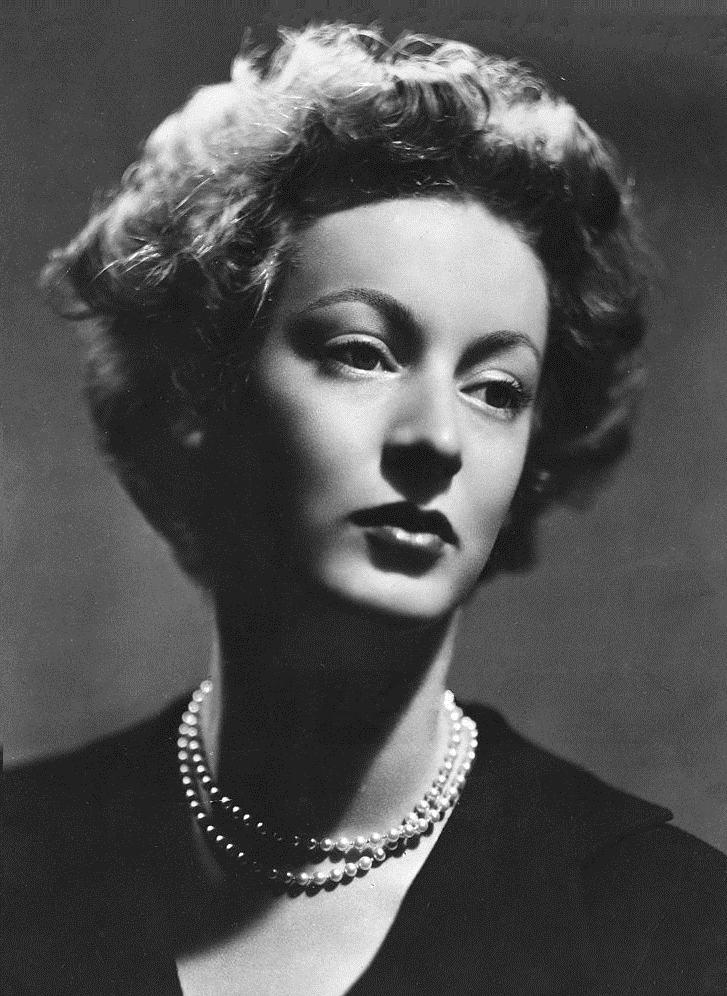
Marella Agnelli

- 4 February – Giampiero Artegiani, Italian singer-songwriter, lyricist and producer (b. 1955)
- 9 February – Mario Gerla, Italian computer scientist and engineer (b. 1943)
- 10 February
  - Mario Bernardo, Italian cinematographer (b. 1919)
  - Maura Viceconte, Italian Olympic long-distance runner (b. 1967)
- 13 February – Miranda Bonansea, Italian actress (b. 1926)
- 15 February – Adriano Ossicini, Italian politician (b. 1920)
- 19 February – Giulio Brogi, Italian actor (b. 1935)
- 21 February – Maurizio Clerici, Italian Olympic rower (b. 1929)
- 23 February – Marella Agnelli, Italian art collector and socialite (b. 1927)
- 24 February – Giovanni Piana, Italian philosopher (b. 1940)

=== March ===
- 9 March – Anna Costanza Baldry

=== April ===
- 5 April – Gianfranco Leoncini, Italian footballer (b. 1939)
- 19 April – Massimo Marino, television presenter and actor (b. 1960)

=== May ===
- 11 May – Gianni De Michelis, Italian politician (b. 1940)

=== June ===
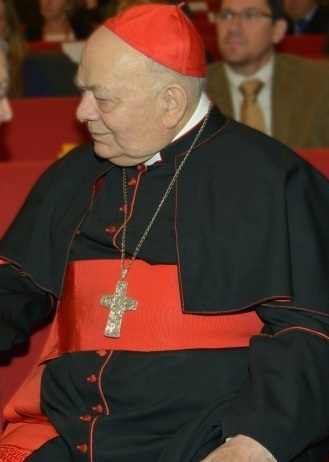
Elio Sgreccia

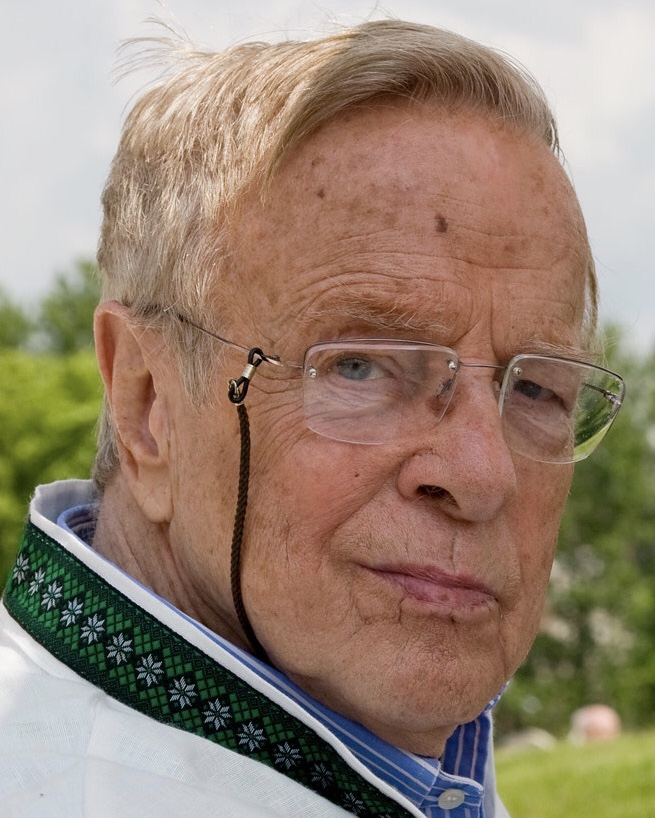
Franco Zeffirelli

- 5 June – Elio Sgreccia, Italian cardinal (b. 1928)
- 7 June – Nello Governato, Italian footballer (b. 1938)
- 8 June – Renzo Patria, Italian politician (b. 1933)
- 10 June – Mario Mangiarotti, Italian fencer (b. 1920)
- 11 June
  - Domenico De Simone, Italian politician (b. 1926)
  - Enrico Nascimbeni, Italian singer (b. 1959)
  - Valeria Valeri, Italian actress (b. 1921)
- 13 June – Rosario Parmegiani, Italian water polo player (b. 1937)
- 15 June – Franco Zeffirelli, film director and politician (b. 1923)
- 17 June
  - Salvatore Senese, Italian politician (b. 1935)
  - Remo Vigni, Italian footballer (b. 1938)
- 18 June – Maria Giuseppa Robucci, Italian supercentenarian (b. 1903)
- 20 June
  - Emanuele Crestini, Italian politician (b. 1972)
  - Gino Pasqualotto, Italian ice hockey player (b. 1955)
- 25 June – Giuseppe Fabiani, Italian Roman Catholic bishop (b. 1926)
- 26 June – Loredana Simioli, Italian actress (b. 1978)
- 30 June – Giovanni Giavazzi, Italian politician (b. 1920)

=== July ===
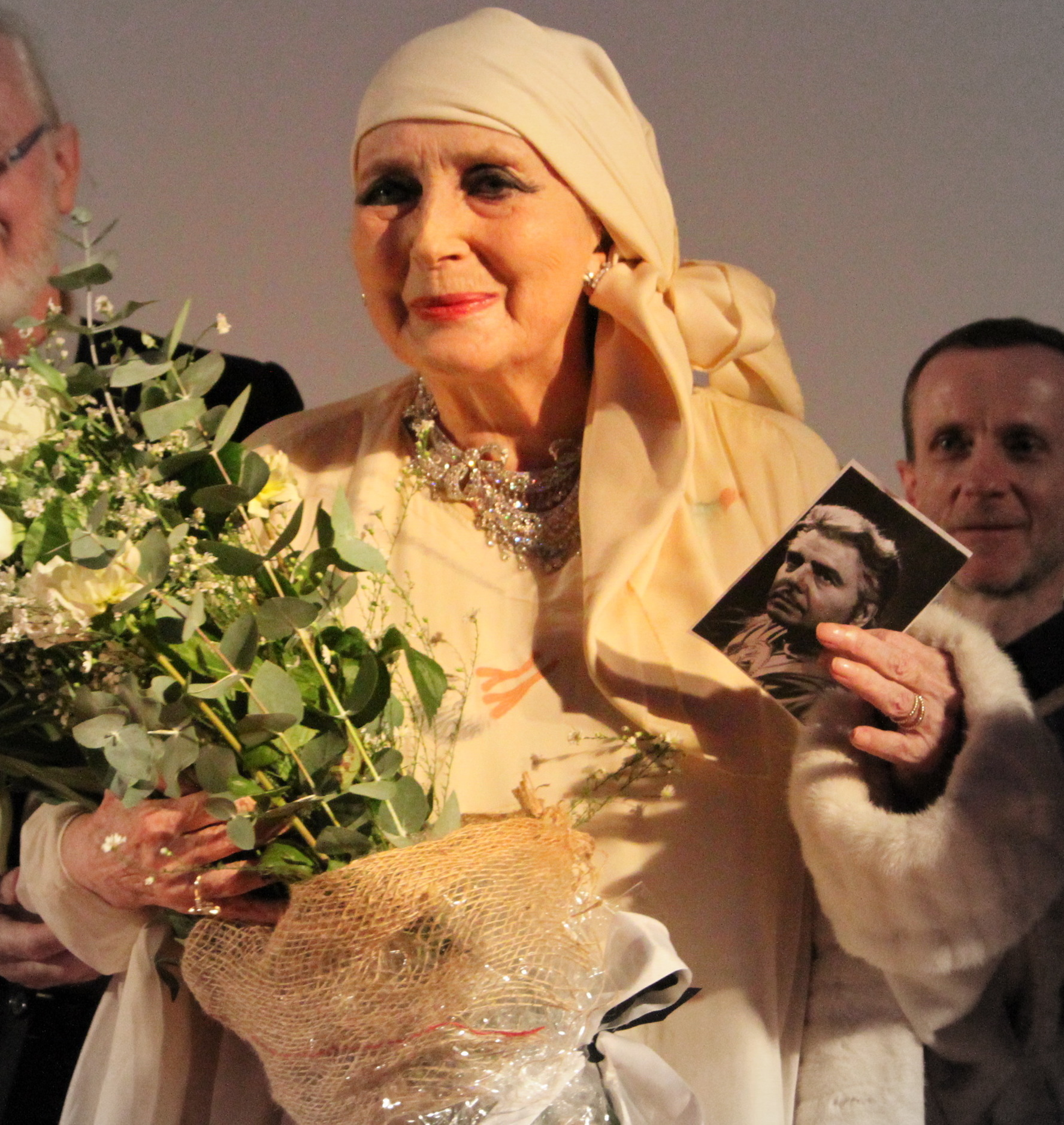
Valentina Cortese

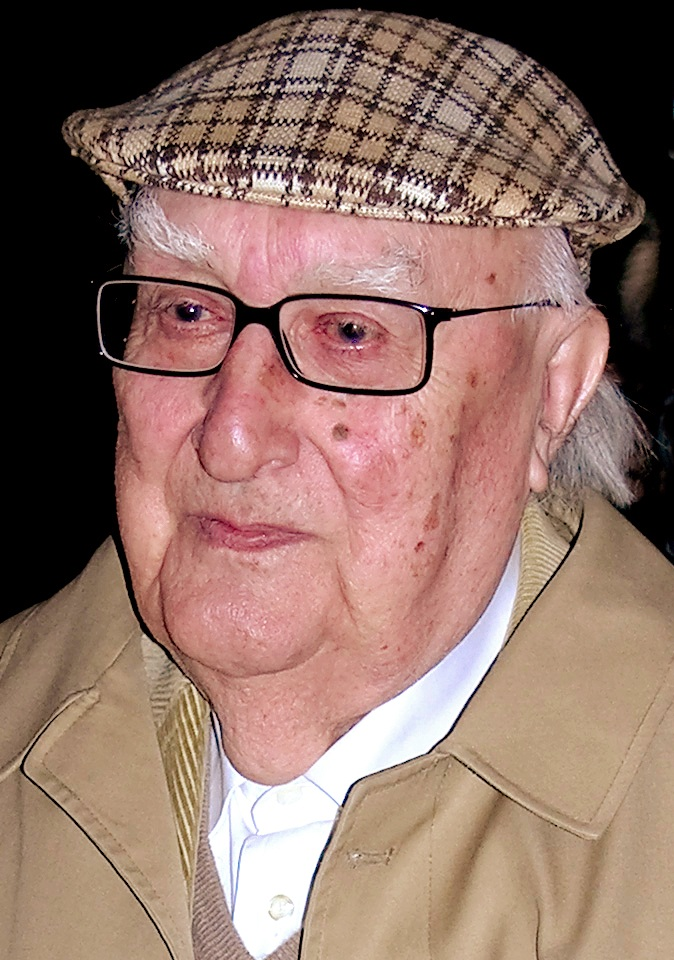
Andrea Camilleri

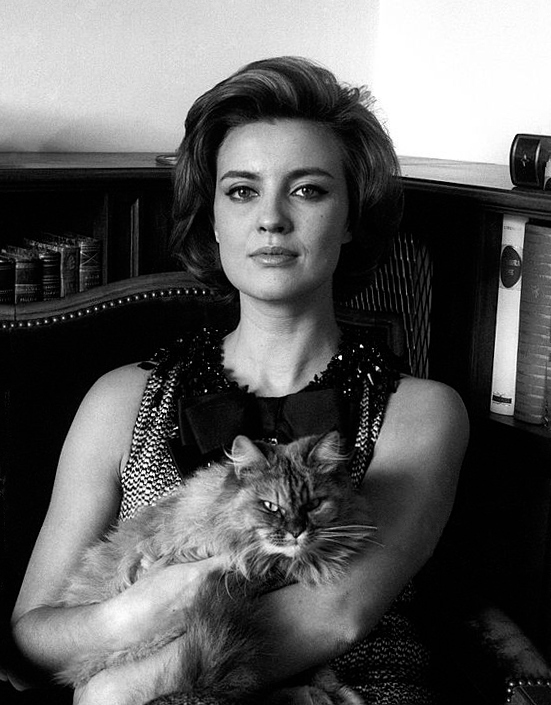
Ilaria Occhini

- 1 July
  - Osvalda Giardi, Italian high jumper and pentathlete (b. 1932)
  - Ennio Guarnieri, Italian cinematographer (b. 1930)
- 2 July – Francesco Pontone, Italian politician (b. 1927)
- 3 July – Vasco Tagliavini, Italian professional football player and coach (b. 1937)
- 5 July
  - Ugo Gregoretti, Italian film director, actor, screenwriter, author and television host (b. 1930
  - Paolo Vinaccia, Italian composer, jazz drummer, and percussionist (b. 1954)
- 7 July – Salvatore Angerami, Italian Roman Catholic prelate (b. 1956)
- 9 July – Domenico Bova, Italian politician (b. 1946)
- 10 July – Valentina Cortese, Italian actress (b. 1923).
- 13 July
  - Augusto Fantozzi, Italian lawyer and politician (b. 1940)
  - Paolo Sardi, Italian cardinal (b. 1934)
- 14 July – Nereo Laroni, Italian politician (b. 1942)
- 17 July
  - Andrea Camilleri, Italian writer (b. 1925)
  - Giuseppe Merlo, Italian tennis player (b. 1927)
- 18 July – Luciano De Crescenzo, Italian writer, film actor, director and engineer (b. 1928)
- 20 July
  - Marisa Merz, Italian artist (b. 1926)
  - Ilaria Occhini, Italian actress (b. 1934)
- 22 July – Giuliana Morandini, Italian writer and literary critic (b. 1938)
- 24 July – Sergio Di Giulio, Italian actor (b. 1945)

=== August ===
- 16 August – Felice Gimondi, Italian racing cyclist (b. 1942)
- 29 August – Achille Silvestrini, Italian cardinal (b. 1923)

=== September ===
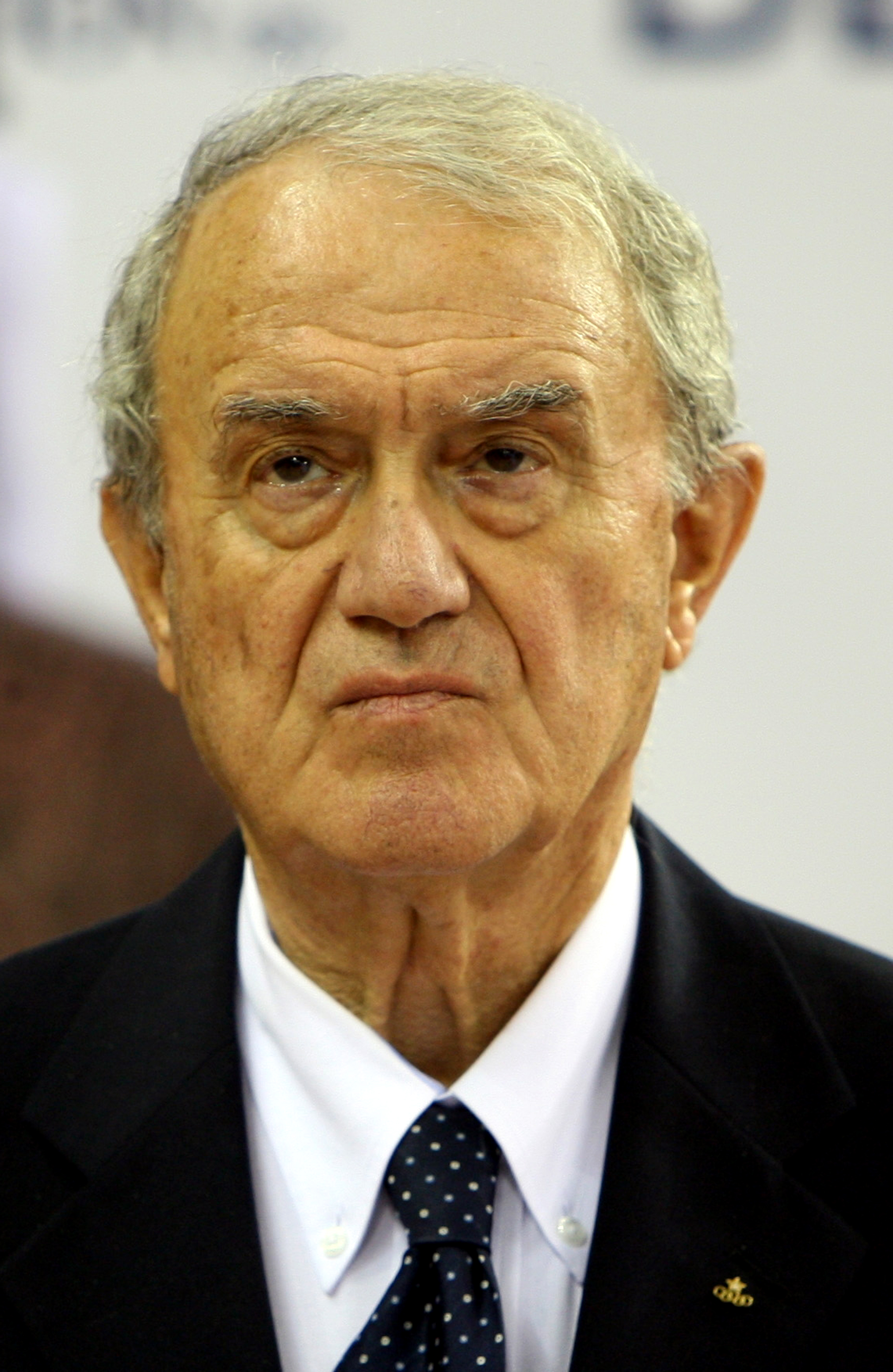
Bruno Grandi

- 2 September – Andrea Gemma, Italian Roman Catholic prelate (b. 1930)
- 7 September – Alberto Cerreti, Italian politician (b. 1939)
- 10 September
  - Stefano Delle Chiaie, Italian neofascist activist (b. 1936)
  - Salvatore Mannuzzu, Italian writer, politician, and magistrate (b. 1930)
- 13 September – Bruno Grandi, Italian sports executive (b. 1934)
- 15 September – Roberto Villetti, Italian politician (b. 1944)
- 17 September – Fabio Buzzi, Italian motorboat builder and racer (b. 1943)
- 19 September – Luigi Bommarito, Italian Roman Catholic archbishop (b. 1926)
- 23 September – Walter Nicoletti, Italian football manager (b. 1952)
- 27 September – Dante Bernini, Italian Roman Catholic prelate (b. 1922)

=== November ===
- 22 November – Cecilia Seghizzi, composer, painter and teacher (b. 1908)

== See also ==
- 2019 European Parliament election
- 2019 in Italian television
