= 1926 in Italy =

- Decades: 1900s; 1910s; 1920s; 1930s; 1940s
- See also: History of Italy; Timeline of Italian history; List of years in Italy

Events from the year 1926 in Italy.

== Kingdom of Italy ==
- Monarch – Victor Emmanuel III (1900–1946)
- Prime Minister – Benito Mussolini

== Events ==
- 7 April – Fascist leader Benito Mussolini survives an attempt on his life by the Irishwoman Violet Gibson.
- 1 August: the football team is founded SSC Napoli, the team is all today one of the best in Italy, with 4 league titles, 6 Coppa Italias, 2 Italian super cups, 1 europa league title, 1 uefa cup winner, winner of serie b(1949-50)also from 1984 to 1991 it was the team of Diego Armando Maradona.
- 5 September – The Italian Grand Prix is held at Monza and won by "Sabipa" (Louis Charavel).
- 19 September – The Giuseppe Meazza (San Siro) Stadium is officially opened in Milan.
- 6 November – The policy of police confinement and internment begins with the issuance of Royal Decree 1848 and lasts until 1943. The decree allows Fascist Italy to deport its perceived political enemies as alleged subversives acting against the State, some of whom were later being knowingly deported to their imminent deaths in concentration camps. In spite of the Fascist regime, many Italians resisted and helped hide people from the authorities.

== Births ==
- 1 January – Claudio Villa, singer (died 1987)
- 8 January – Lazzaro Donati, artist (died 1977)
- 26 January – Franco Evangelisti, composer (died 1980)
- 23 February – Luigi De Magistris, cardinal (died 2022)
- 26 March – Aldo Tarlao, Olympic rower (died 2018)
- 10 May – Pasquale Panìco, politician (died 2018)
- 23 June – Arnaldo Pomodoro, sculptor (died 2025)
- 14 August – Agostino Cacciavillan, cardinal
- 14 August – Giorgio Ruffolo, politician (died 2023)
- 18 August – Franca Marzi, film actress (died 1989)
- 2 September – Armando Cossutta, communist politician (died 2015)
- 18 September – Franco Archibugi, political economist (died 2020)
- 21 September – Carla Calò, actress (died 2019)
- 7 October – Marcello Abbado, composer and pianist (died 2020)
- 25 November – Ivano Fontana, boxer (died 1993)

== Deaths ==
- 4 January – Margherita of Savoy, Queen consort of Italy (b. 1851)
