= 2001 in Italy =

- Decades: 1980s; 1990s; 2000s; 2010s; 2020s
- See also: History of Italy; Timeline of Italian history; List of years in Italy

Events from the year 2001 in Italy.

== Incumbents ==
- President: Carlo Azeglio Ciampi
- Prime Minister: Giuliano Amato (until 11 June), Silvio Berlusconi (starting 11 June)

== Events ==
- 21 February -
  - Sicilian Mafia boss Bernardo Provenzano arrested in Sicily after 38 years on the run.
  - Novi Ligure Murder: a mother and child are murdered in Novi Ligure.
- 13 May - a general election is held and is won by Silvio Berlusconi.
- 20 July–22 July - 27th G8 summit held in Genoa.
- 20 July - an anti-globalisation protester at the G8 summit is shot dead by police.
- 8 October - 2001 Linate Airport runway collision: Scandinavian Airlines Flight 686 crashes at Linate Airport in Milan killing 118.
- 15 December - The Leaning Tower of Pisa reopens after 11 years and $27,000,000 spent to fortify it, without fixing its famous lean.
- December - The Fiat Stilo is launched to replace the outdated Brava/Bravo.

=== Undated ===
- De-Javu, an Italian house duo is founded.
- Editoria & Spettacolo publishing house is established in Rome.
- MolecularLab, a scientific website, is founded.

== Births ==
- 22 April - Tito Traversa, climber (died 2013)

== Deaths ==
- 27 January - Marie-José of Belgium, last Queen of Italy, consort to Umberto II (born 1906)
- 12 February - Tiberio Mitri, boxer (born 1926)
- 13 February - Ugo Fano, physicist (born 1912)
- 14 February - Piero Umiliani, composer (born 1926)
- 23 February - Sergio Mantovani, racing driver (born 1929)
- 10 March - Massimo Morsello, musician and political activist (born 1958)
- 5 April - Aldo Olivieri, football player (born 1910)
- 12 April - Alberto Erede, conductor (born 1909)
- 20 April - Giuseppe Sinopoli, conductor and composer (born 1946)
- 25 April - Michele Alboreto, racing driver (born 1956)
- 26 April - Renzo Vespignani, painter and illustrator (born 1924)
- May - Armando Nannuzzi, cinematographer (born 1925)
- 14 May - Mauro Bolognini, film director (born 1922)
- 20 May - Renato Carosone, musician (born 1920)
- 21 May – Mario Martinelli, politician (born 1906)
- 23 May - Alessandro Natta, politician (born 1918)
- 26 May - Vittorio Brambilla, racing driver (born 1937)
- 18 June - Paolo Emilio Taviani, politician (born 1912)
- 20 July - Carlo Giuliani, protester shot dead at the G8 summit (born 1978)
- 22 July - Indro Montanelli, journalist and historian (born 1909)
- 26 July - Giuseppe Sensi, Cardinal (born 1907)
- 19 September - Aldo Capitanio, comic book artist (born 1952)
- 11 October - Beni Montresor, artist (born 1926)
- 3 November - Lucio Colletti, philosopher (born 1924)
- 8 November - Paolo Bertoli, Cardinal (born 1908)
- 9 November - Giovanni Leone, Prime Minister (born 1908)
- 5 December - Franco Rasetti, physicist (born 1901)

== See also ==
- 2001 in Italian television
- List of Italian films of 2001
