= I Can't Stop =

I Can't Stop may refer to:

- I Can't Stop (album), a 2003 album by Al Green
- "I Can't Stop" (The Osmonds song), 1967
- "I Can't Stop", (Gary Numan song), 1986
- "I Can't Stop", a song by The Sinceros, from the 1980 album 2nd Debut
- "I Can't Stop", a song by Livin Out Loud, from the 2004 album Then and Now
- "I Can't Stop", a song by Flux Pavilion, from the 2010 EP Lines in Wax, sampled by Kanye West and Jay-Z
- "I Can't Stop", a song by De-Javu, from the 2001 single album
- I Can't Stop, a 2015 album by BoDeans

== See also ==
- Can't Stop (disambiguation)
