= 1931 in Italy =

- Decades: 1910s; 1920s; 1930s; 1940s; 1950s
- See also: History of Italy; Timeline of Italian history; List of years in Italy

Events from the year 1931 in Italy.

== Incumbents ==
- King: Victor Emmanuel III.
- Prime Minister: Benito Mussolini

== Events ==
- July 1 – The rebuilt Milano Centrale railway station officially opens in Italy.

== Births ==
- 1 January – Furio Colombo, politician and journalist (d. 2025)
- 4 January – Guido Messina, road and track cyclist (d. 2020)
- 28 January – Lucia Bosè, actress (d. 2020)
- 6 February – Paolo Violi, Italian-Canadian mobster (d. 1978)
- 19 February – Camillo Ruini, cardinal
- 13 April – Anita Cerquetti, operatic soprano (d. 2014)
- 3 May – Aldo Rossi, architect and designer (d. 1997)
- 7 June – Andrea Gemma, bishop (d. 2019)
- 24 June – Emilio Fede, newsreader, journalist and writer
- 14 July – Maria Musso, sprinter and pentathlete (d. 2024)
- 6 September – Bassano Staffieri, bishop (d. 2018)
- 1 October – Sylvano Bussotti, composer (d. 2021)
- 11 October – Calcedonio Di Pisa, criminal (d. 1962)
- 29 October – Franco Interlenghi, actor (d. 2015)
- 20 November – Rosita Missoni, knitwear designer (d. 2025)
- 23 December – Maria Tipo, pianist (d. 2025)

== Deaths ==
- 24 January – Alice Schiavoni Bosio, journalist and suffragette (b. 1871)
- 23 May – Luigi Arcangeli, motor racer (car racing accident) (b. 1902)
- 17 September – Marcello Amero D'Aste, admiral and politician (b. 1853)
