= Mainardi =

Mainardi is an Italian surname. Notable people with the surname include:

- Andrea Mainardi, Italian Renaissance painter
- Bastiano Mainardi (1460–1513), Italian Renaissance painter
- Danilo Mainardi (1933–2017), Italian ethologist, scholar, and writer
- Diogo Mainardi (born 1962), Brazilian writer, producer, screenwriter, and journalist
- Elisa Mainardi (1930–2016), Italian actress
- Enrico Mainardi (1897–1976), Italian classical cellist, composer and conductor
- Francesco Mainardi (born 1942), Italian physicist and mathematician
- Gaspare Mainardi (1800–1879), Italian mathematician
- Giovanni Manardo (1462–1536), Italian physician, botanist and humanist
- Lattanzio Mainardi, Italian Renaissance painter
- Mia Mainardi (born 2008), Argentine artistic gymnast
- Patricia Mainardi (born 1942), American art historian and university professor
