= Cometti =

Cometti is an Italian surname. Notable people with the surname include:

- Aldana Cometti (born 1996), Argentine professional footballer
- Dennis Cometti (1949–2026), Australian sports commentator
- Giampiero Cotti Cometti (1935–2009), Italian geographer
- Sara Cristina Cometti, Italian fencer in the 2003 European Fencing Championships
- Valerio Cometti (born 1975), Italian industrial designer
- Zaccaria Cometti (1937–2020), Italian footballer
