= 1929 in Italy =

- Decades: 1900s; 1910s; 1920s; 1930s; 1940s
- See also: History of Italy; Timeline of Italian history; List of years in Italy

Events during the year 1929 in Italy.

== Incumbents ==
- Monarch: Victor Emmanuel III
- Prime Minister: Benito Mussolini

== Events ==
- 11 February – The Lateran Treaty, an agreement between the Kingdom of Italy and the Holy See, is signed in Rome. The Concordat of 1929 made Catholicism the sole religion of Italy; this remained the case until 1984.
- April – The first of the Saccopastore skulls is discovered.

== Births ==
- 3 January – Sergio Leone, film director (died 1989)
- 11 January – Nicoletta Orsomando, continuity announcer (died 2021)
- 26 February – Paolo Ferrari, actor (died 2018)
- 15 March – Antonietta Stella, operatic soprano (died 2022)
- 8 July – Milena Greppi, hurdler (died 2016)
- 23 July – Gaetano Giuliano, politician (died 2023)
- 4 August – Gabriella Tucci, operatic soprano (died 2020)
- 6 September – Beppe Menegatti, theatre director (died 2024)
- 4 November – Riccardo Ehrman, journalist (died 2021)
- 1 December – Valentino Valli, footballer (died 2021)
- 19 December – Lorenzo Buffon, footballer (died 2025)

== Deaths ==
- 7 January – Eugenio Tosi, Cardinal Archbishop of Milan (born 1864)
- 12 April – Enrico Ferri, criminologist (born 1856)
- 9 November – Guido Keller, aviator and political activist (born 1892)
