= Smalto =

Smalto may refer to:

- a piece of glass used in a mosaic
- Francesco Smalto, Italian fashion designer.
- Smalto, an album by Nada
