= Caccavale =

Caccavale is an Italian surname. Notable people with the surname include:

- Ernesto Caccavale (born 1963), Italian politician and journalist
- Michele Caccavale (1947–2019), Italian politician
- Sal Caccavale (born 1985), American soccer player and coach
