= Massimo Marino =

Massimo Marino may refer to:

- Massimo Marino (cyclist)
- Massimo Marino (TV presenter)
