= European Association for Research on Plant Breeding =

Plant Breeding Research Association

- Abbreviation: EUCARPIA
- Formation: 1956
- Type: Scientific
- Purpose: Research
- Headquarters: Wageningen
- Location: Netherlands
- Members: 2000
- Official language: German / English
- President / CEO: Andreas Börner
- Website: http://www.eucarpia.eu

The European Association for Research on Plant Breeding, Europäische Gesellschaft für Züchtungsforschung, Association Européenne pour l'Amélioration des Plantes, Asociación Europea para el Mejoramiento de las Plantas, (in short EUCARPIA) is a non-profit organisation which promotes international scientific and technical research in the area of plant breeding in order to encourage its further development.

== History ==
EUCARPIA was founded in 1956 and has its headquarters in Wageningen (the Netherlands).

It was instrumental in the 1960s to build gene banks in Europe.

== Mission and aims ==
Its aim is exchange of information and maintenance if international contacts in the area of plant breeding. To this end the society organises and supports annual workshops and meetings on current topics from all sectors of plant breeding and genetic research, during which there are discussions about various agricultural crops and topics of general interest. These topics pursue method- or plant- specific questions on topics from biometry to genome analysis and from resistance breeding to the history of plant breeding. A General Congress and General Assembly is held every four years.

Sections and working Groups: There are sections and working groups with the GPZ which hold regular meetings and workshops:

- Potatoes, Vanessa Prigge (Germany)
- Cereals, Andreas Börner (Germany)
- Organic and Low-Input Agriculture, Linda Legzdiņa (Latvia)
- Fodder Crops and Amenity Grasses, David Kopecký (Czech Republic)
- Genetic Resources, Shelagh Kell (United Kingdom)
- Maize and Sorghum, Alain Charcosset (France)
- Vegetables, Yuling, Bai (The Netherlands)
- Fruit, Jiri Sedlak (Czech Republic)
- Ornamentals, Johan van Huylenbroeck (Belgium)
- Oil and Protein Crops, Leonardo Velasco (Spain)
- Biometrics in Plant Breeding, Hans-Peter Piepho (Germany)

Members that The Society has bestowed honorary membership on include the following:

- Erich von Tschermak-Seysenegg, Austria, 1956
- Wilhelm Rudorf, Germany, 1965
- Jean Bustarret, France, 1968
- Erik Akerberg, Sweden, 1972
- Jan Stefan Bojanowski, Poland, 1989
- Hermann Hänsel, Austria, 2004
- Fernando Nuez-Vinals, Spain, 2004
- Gerhard Röbbelen, Germany, 2004
- Peter Ruckenbauer, Austria, 2012
- Michele Stanca, Italy, 2012
- John Bradshaw, Scotland, 2012
- Hans Winzeler, Switzerland, 2016
