= Vigni =

Vigni is a surname. Notable people with the surname include:

- Remo Vigni (1938–2019), Italian footballer
- Silvano Vigni (born 1954), Italian Palio jockey
