= 1932 in Italy =

- Decades: 1910s; 1920s; 1930s; 1940s; 1950s
- See also: History of Italy; Timeline of Italian history; List of years in Italy

Events from the year 1932 in Italy.

== Incumbents ==
- King: Victor Emmanuel III.
- Prime Minister: Benito Mussolini

== Events ==
- January 1: the first number of the Quaderni di Giustizia e libertà appears in Paris.
- January 4: convention between Italy and Turkey.
- January 13: the fascist police vanquishes the Turin Giustizia e libertà group.
- January 19: Italian troops seize the oasis of Kufra, center of the Libyan insurgents’ resistance
- February 11: Pius XI. receives Mussolini in Vatican for the third anniversary of the Lateran treaty; the visit signs the rapprochement of Church and fascism, after the contrasts about the Azione Cattolica.
- March 29: Filippo Turati dies in Paris.
- April 9: The FIAT 508 Balilla, the first Italian people's car, is presented at the Milan Auto Show.
- May 5: in Ferrara, 2. Conference of unionist and corporatist studies; in the debate, socialist idea emerges, as the “owner corporations” proposed by Ugo Spirito.
- June 17: the antifascists Angelo Sbardellotto and Domenico Bovone are shot in Rome, the first for having planned the Mussolini's assassination, the second for some demonstration dynamite attacks.
- July 20: cabinet reshuffle. The ministers Dino Grandi (Foreign Affairs) and Giuseppe Bottaii (Corporations) resign and Mussolini takes on personally their tasks. Grandi becomes Italian ambassador in London.
- September 5: International Stresa conference begins.
- October 22: March on Rome's Decennial. The anniversary is celebrated with a Mussolini's oratory tour in the mayor Italian cities, an Exhibition of the Fascist revolution (opened the 27) and the opening of Via dell’Impero (28) and the Foro Mussolini (November 5).
- October 25: inauguration of the Milan-Torino highway
- November 5: amnesty for the Decennial; about two thousands political prisoners are freed from jail and internment.
- November 13: in Paris, Conference of the Concentrazione Antifascista.
- November 17: new statute of the National Fascisct party.
- November 30: Augusto Turati, former Fascist party secretary and director of La stampa, is expelled from the party for his presumed homosexuality.
- December 17: the inscription to the Fascist party is made mandatory for the public employees.
- December 18: inauguration of Littoria.

== Economy ==
In 1932, the Great Depression touches its peak in Italy too. The unemployed are officially a million (a quarter of the workforce) but the real cipher is even higher; the industrial production is 85% of the one in 1929. The fascist regime answers with a politic of dirigisme, encouraging fusions and business alliances (Law 834) and realizing great public Works, widely publicized but insufficient to solve the problem. The deficit of the state passes from 504 million liras (budget year 1931) to 3 billion 587 million liras.

The three main Italian shipping lines (NGI, Lloyd Sabaudo and Cosoluch STN) merge in the Italia Flotte Riunite.

The ICO becomes a S. A. and changes name in Olivetti S. p. A.; the direction passes from Camillo Olivetti to the son Adriano. The firm presents MP1, the first portable typewriter.

== Art ==
- Annunciazione by Alberto Savinio.

Beside the monumentalism of Marcello Piacentini, the official architect of the regime, the rationalist school flourishes too: Giuseppe Terragni begins the Casa del Fascio in Como and Giuseppe Pagano (director of Casabella, organ of the movement) the Institute of Physic in Rome. In Milan, the BBPR studio and the estate FontanaArte (producing glass lamps, designed by Giò Ponti) are constituted.

Inauguration of the Pinacoteca Nazionale in Siena.

Amedeo Maiuri excavates the cave of the Sybil in Pozzuoli.

== Culture ==
- La dottrina del fascismo (The fascism's theory) – by Giovanni Gentile and Benito Mussolini, voice of the Italian Encyclopaedia.
- Colloqui con Mussolini (Talking with Mussolini) – by Emil Ludwig and Benito Mussolini.
- Storia d’Europa nel secolo decimonono (History of Europe in the Nineteenth century) – by Benedetto Croce.
- Principi di scienza delle finanze (Principles of financial science) – by Luigi Einaudi.
- Il soviet e l’anarchia (Soviet and anarchy) – by Camillo Berneri.

Edoardo Weiss founds the Italian Psychoanalytic Society and the Italian Revue of Psychoanalysis.

First issue of La settimana enigmistica and Topolino, again now two of the most popular weeklies in Italy.

== Literature ==
- Stampe dell’Ottocento (Nineteenth-century engravings) – by Aldo Palazzeschi.
- Singolare avventura di viaggio (Strange travel adventure) – by Vitaliano Brancati; the book is forbidden by the fascist censure for its erotic content.

Cesare Pavese begins its literary work, with Ciau Masin (a collection of poems and tales, published posthumously) and the translation of Moby Dick.

Hermeticism is the prevailing poetic movement, with Salvatore Quasimodo (Oboe sommerso) and the debuting Alfonso Gatto (Isola).

- La casa dei doganieri by Eugenio Montale.
- L’el di di mort, alegher (It's All Souls’ Day, be merry), by Delio Tessa, poems in Milanese dialect.

UTET launches the series of books for children La scala d’oro.

=== Literary awards ===
- Bagutta prize: Leonida Repaci, Storia dei fratelli Rupe.
- Viareggio prize: Antonio Foschini, L’avventura di Villon.

== Theatre ==
- Trovarsi (To find themselves) – by Luigi Pirandello.
- L’ultimo scugnizzo (The last scugnizzo) – by Raffaele Viviani.

The Neapolitan De Filippo brothers (Eduardo, Titina and Peppino) get fame nationwide, thanks to the success of Natale in Casa Cupiello (premiered in Christmas 1931.) In the year, the company stages three new plays (Ditegli sempre di sì, Gennariniello, Chi è cchiu' felice 'e me!) and seven single acts by Eduardo, beyond various pieces by Peppino and other authors.

== Cinema ==
In 1932, the Italian cinema is, overall, in a period of stasis with 18 feature films produced and only 2 companies active (Cines and Caesar Film). Cines under the direction of the writer Emilio Cecchi produces a series of valuable art documentaries and establishes a dubbing studio of its own (previously, the Italian versions of the foreign movies were realized abroad). Renè Clair's A nous la libertè is the first film dubbed in Italy, with the voice of Gino Cervi.

The production is composed mostly by escapist comedies (Telefoni bianchi): Five to nil and Three lucky fools by Mario Bonnard, One night with you by Ferruccio Biancini, The telephone operator by Nunzio Malasomma, The last adventure by Mario Camerini. Besides, some films about opera (Pergolesi, by Guido Brignone) and two propaganda movies exalting the bravery of the Italian people (the aviation docudrama The blue fleet by Gennaro Righelli and the sport drama Palio, by Alessandro Blasetti) are realized.

Two films are on a higher level: The table of the poor, by Alessandro Blasetti, a dramedy about the Naples fallen noblemen and What scoundrel men are! by Mario Camerini, idyll between two commoners, a car-driver, and a saleswoman. The Camerini's film, considered a forerunner of neo-realism, makes the young protagonist Vittorio de Sica a movie star and launches the song Parlami d’amore Mariù.

In September, Venice hosts the First International Film Festival.

== Music ==
- Maria Egiziaca and Huntingtower, by Ottorino Respighi.
- La donna serpente by Alfredo Casella.
- Pinotta by Pietro Mascagni.

== Science ==
In Cambridge, Giuseppe Occhialini, in collaboration with Patrick Blackett, studies the creation process of the positron.

In Genoa, Guglielmo Marconi lights by radio the Sydney Exposition in Australia.

== Sport ==
=== Italian championships ===
- Serie A: Juventus; Angelo Schiavio (Bologna) and Pedro Petrone (Fiorentina) are head-gunners, with 25 goals.
- Cycling: Learco Guerra.
- Basketball: Società Ginnastica Triestina (male) and Gioiosa Milano (female).

=== Italian victories ===
- Mitropa Cup: Bologna FC.
- Grand Prix Season: Tazio Nuvolari on Alfa Romeo.
- Mille Miglia: Mario Uberto Baconin Borzacchini and Amedeo Bignami on Alfa Romeo
- FIS Alpine World Ski Championships: Paola Weisinger (female downhill).

Oddone Piazza is the first Italian boxer to compete for the world title (middleweight), against William “Gorilla” Jones.

==== Cycling ====
- UCI Road world championship: Alfredo Binda.
- Giro d’Italia: Antonio Pesenti (the final stage is broadcast by radio for the first time).
- Milan-Sanremo : Alfredo Bovet (native Swiss).
- Giro di Lombardia: Antonio Negrini.

==== Gold metals ====
At the 1932 Summer Olympics, Italy gets 12 gold, 12 silver and 12 bronze metals (all male).

- Sport of athletics: Luigi Beccali (1500 meters).
- Cycling: individual road race (Attilio Pavesi), road race and team pursuit.
- Fencing: épée (Giancarlo Cornaggia-Medici) and foil (Gustavo Marzi)
- Gymnastics: Romeo Neri (individual all-around and parallel bars), Savino Guglielmetti (vault) and team all-around.
- Shooting: Renzo Morigi (25 m rapid pistol).
- Wrestling: Giovanni Gozzi (Greco-Roman featherweight).

== Births ==
- 5 January: Umberto Eco, philosopher and novelist (d. 2016)
- 11 January: Fernando Di Leo, director (d. 2003)
- 22 January: Giovanni Raboni, poet (d. 2004)
- 5 February: Cesare Maldini, football player and coach (d. 2016)
- 1 March: Luigi Petroselli, Mayor of Rome (d. 1981)
- 21 March: Gianfranco Funari, TV presenter (d. 2008)
- 31 March: Tullio De Mauro, linguist and Minister of Education (d. 2017)
- 21 April: Jula De Palma, singer
- 22 April: Jimmy il Fenomeno, actor (d. 2018)
- 11 May: Valentino, fashion designer.
- 12 May: Umberto Bindi, singer-songwriter (2002).
- 13 May :Gianni Boncompagni, TV author (d. 2017)
- 19 June: Anna Maria Pierangeli (d. 1971) and Marisa Pavan (twins), Italian actresses.
- 13 July: Dana Ghia, actress, singer and model
- 15 July: Giuseppe Ferrara, director (d. 2016).
- 25 July: Luigi Berlinguer, Minister of Education.
- 12 August: Franco Tatò, manager.
- 19 August: Lucio Magri, journalist and politician (d. 2011).
- 29 August: Pietro Valpreda, anarchist (d. 2002)
- 8 October: Antonio Pizzinato, syndicalist.
- 11 October: Sergio Toppi, cartoonist (d. 2012).
- 23 November: Bruno Visintin, boxer (d. 2015).
- 25 November: Alighiero Noschese, impersonator (d. 1979).
- 5 December: Giampaolo Rugarli, novelist (d. 2014)
- 30 December: Paolo Villaggio, comic actor (d. 2017)
- 31 December: Enzo Mari, modernist artist and furniture designer (d. 2020)

== Deaths ==
- 1 March: Dino Campana, poet (b. 1885)
- 3 March: Alfieri Maserati, founder of Maserati (b. 1887)
- 10 March: Paolo Boselli, Prime minister (b. 1838)
- 29 March: Filippo Turati, socialist politician (b. 1857)
- 20 April: Giuseppe Peano, mathematician (b. 1858)
- 22 April: Umberto Cagni, admiral and explorer (b. 1863).
- 22 July: Errico Malatesta, anarchist (b. 1853)
- 23 July: Giustino Fortunato, scholar and politician (b. 1848)
- 9 August: Sante Ceccherini, general and fencer (b. 1863)
- 19 August: Leone Wollemborg, pioneer of the Italian cooperatives (b. 1859)
- 11 November: Augusto Murri, physician (b. 1841)
- date unknown: Vittorio Alinari, photographer (b. 1859)

== Sources ==
- Cronologia Universale : dalla preistoria all’età contemporanea. Torino : UTET, 1979. ISBN 8802034680
- Storia d'Italia: cronologia 1815-1990. Novara: De Agostini, 1991. ISBN 8840294406
- I fatti e le notizie dell’anno 1932.
- Storia d’Italia nel secolo ventesimo. Strumenti e fonti, care of Claudio Pavone.
- Film italiani 1932
