= 1925 in Italy =

- Decades: 1900s; 1910s; 1920s; 1930s; 1940s
- See also: History of Italy; Timeline of Italian history; List of years in Italy

The following lists events that occurred in 1925 in the Kingdom of Italy.

== Incumbents ==
- King – Victor Emmanuel III
- Prime Minister – Benito Mussolini

== Events ==
=== November ===
- 4 November – Italian socialist deputy and expert marksman Tito Zaniboni took a hotel room opposite the Palazzo Chigi with the intent of shooting Benito Mussolini with a telescopic rifle when he came out to the balcony to make a speech. Police had been tipped off by an intercepted phone call and stopped the would-be assassin.
- 7 November – Several Italian opposition leaders were arrested in connection with the assassination attempt on Benito Mussolini.
- 12 November – The Italian government agreed to repay its war debt to the United States with a fixed interest rate of 0.4 percent.

=== December ===
- 24 December – The Decree on the Powers of the Head of the Government is passed, giving Mussolini sole executive power over parliament and solidifying the one party, police state of Fascist Italy. Mussolini's title is formally changed from "president of the Council of Ministers" to "head of the government". From here on, he is known as Il Duce, the supreme leader.

== Births ==
- 1 January – Mario Merz, artist (d. 2003)
- 4 January – Enrico Perucconi, athlete (d. 2020)
- 5 January – Marcello Costalunga, Roman Catholic prelate (d. 2010)
- 16 February – Romolo Bizzotto, football player and coach (d. 2017)
- 9 July – Mary de Rachewiltz, poet and translator (d. 2026)

== Companies founded ==
- The house of Fendi was launched in 1925 by Adele and Edoardo Fendi
