= What About Us (Livin Out Loud album) =

Studio album by Livin Out Loud
- Released: July 27, 2006
- Genre: R&B, Hip-Hop, Pop
- Length: 55:09
- Label: Kin Productions

Livin Out Loud chronology
Then and Now (2004)	What About Us (2006)	What About Us (Special Edition) (2008)

Singles from What About Us
- 1. "Where's The Love" Released: July 22, 2005; 2. "What About Us" Released: May 30, 2006; 3. "All That Really Matters" Released: March 23, 2007; 4. "Lately (US only)" Released: 2008; 5. "Brokeazz (Radio Edit)" Released: February 1, 2010

What About Us is the third studio album of American R&B group Livin Out Loud. It was released first in the United Kingdom. As of July 2, 2006, it ranked number 7 on the World Hip Hop Chart and number 7 also on the UK Hip Hop Chart.

The album was pre-released on CD Baby before its official UK release in September 2006.

In London, Livin Out Loud achieved chart success with the single, "All That Really Matters," which went to #1 on the DJ Play list. This led to a deal with Fontana Distribution, a Universal Music Group company. "Lately" made it onto Billboard’s Hot Adult R&B Airplay chart and became #1 in several markets, including Little Rock and New Orleans. "Lately" also charted at #31 on the Urban Adult Contemporary Chart. "So Amazing" was the featured track on Bob Mardis' award-winning documentary, Keeping The Faith, about rebuilding efforts by faith-based organizations after Hurricane Katrina.

In 2010, the music video, "Brokeazz (Radio Edit)," received over 300,000 YouTube views in the first few months of its release.

The songs "Lately" and "All That Really Matters (5am Remix)" appear on the UK release of their 2015 album, Take It Easy, in addition to an interlude form of "You Are My Sunshine."

== Track listing ==
Number	Song title	Length
1.	What About Us - Urban LA/NY Mix	3:39
2.	Where's The Love - Original Urban Mix	3:21
3.	Brokeazz (Remix)	4:06
4.	Make Me Move	3:48
5.	Hey Yo	3:51
6.	Lately	4:01
7.	Had Enough	3:29
8.	You Are My Sunshine	2:39
9.	All That Really Matters	3:32
10.	Static	2:58
11.	Where's The Love - Burbree Mix	3:35
12.	What You Came Here For	3:37
13.	So Amazing	4:59
14.	What About Us - 2Darc UK Urban Mix	3:58
15.	All That Really Matters (5am Remix)	3:36
