= Livin Out Loud =

Background information
- Origin: Los Angeles, California, United States
- Genres: R&B, soul, hip hop, pop
- Labels: Kin Productions
- Members: Reuben MacCalla; Sylvia MacCalla
- Past members: Dminor; J. Martini; Lisa LaShawn
- Website: livinoutloud.co.uk

Livin Out Loud is an R&B music group consisting of brother and sister, Reuben and Sylvia MacCalla. Reuben MacCalla, also known professionally as Reuben Alexander, is the creative producer for the group and its label, Kin Productions. He is also a performer, songwriter, and producer. Sylvia MacCalla is an actor (Rent, Hairspray, etc.), singer, songwriter, and co-executive producer. The group also formerly included Lisa LaShawn, Dminor, and J. Martini. J Martini is a singer, songwriter, and actor (Jersey Boys, General Hospital, etc.). Lisa LaShawn is a singer and songwriter (written for Mandy Moore and others). Though no longer in the foreground, J. Martini and Dminor both maintain involvement with the group, the former as a guitarist and songwriter, the latter as a music video director. The group is known for its tracks "More Than a Fantasy," "Where's the Love," "You Make Me Smile," "What About Us" and "All That Really Matters."

Livin Out Loud was launched when Reuben and Sylvia collaborated with their brother, Thomas MacCalla, to form Kin Productions as a vehicle to combine their respective artistic and business talents. According to Reuben, "We've all been very blessed with the opportunity to work in an industry that we love... and the name, 'Livin Out Loud,' is all about sharing that love."

Livin Out Loud has received praise from numerous publications on both sides of the Atlantic. UK press has called them "America's best-kept secret." The group was a featured artist in Billboard Magazine (4 October 2009), which said:

Livin Out Loud seemingly exists in a series of alternate universes. In the United Kingdom, a handful of the R&B quarter’s singles have been in rotation at dance clubs and urban radio, remixed by prominent DJ’s for the last four years. In the American South, they have attracted listeners and programmers at adult R&B radio. In Japan, the act has sold 2,000 vinyl copies of the single "More Than A Fantasy," released via Mo’s Music. Not bad for a group based out of Hollywood.

In the United Kingdom, Soul and Jazz and Funk magazine (27 April 2010) said:

LIVIN' OUT LOUD are an American four piece group who are well known to the UK soul cognoscenti. What few copies of their 2006 album What About Us that were available in Europe were quickly snapped up... The first track to be leaked from the album is called Cuz I Gotta Know (in a special Souled Out mix) and it's a smooth slice of steppers soul that will delight sophisticated groovers.

In London, Livin Out Loud achieved chart success with the single, "All That Really Matters," which went to #1 on the DJ Play list. This led to a deal with Fontana Distribution, a Universal Music Group company. Two other singles, "Lately" and "I Can’t Stop," made it onto Billboard’s Hot Adult R&B Airplay chart. "Lately" made it to #1 in several markets, including Little Rock and New Orleans. "Lately" and "I Can't Stop" charted at #31 and #34 respectively on the Urban Adult Contemporary Chart. "So Amazing" was the featured track on Bob Mardis' award-winning documentary, Keeping The Faith, about rebuilding efforts by faith-based organizations after Hurricane Katrina.

Livin Out Loud's music can be found on music download sites such as iTunes, Amazon, etc. In 2010, the music video, "Brokeazz (Radio Edit)," received over 300,000 YouTube views in the first few months of its release. In the UK, Urban Essentials released the single, "Cuz I Gotta Know (Souled Out Mix)," in anticipation of the group's new album later in the year.

On 10 April 2015, Livin Out Loud released their first album as a duo since their debut. This UK-exclusive release, entitled Take It Easy and subtitled "A Musical Timecapsule," includes ten new songs and four re-mastered songs. The album's title track has received radio attention in London, and the group has performed in support of the album in the UK.

== Discography ==
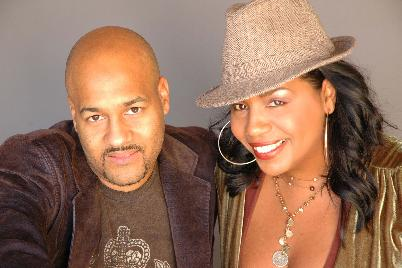
Reuben and Sylvia

- Livin Out Loud - 2000
- Live At Humphrey's - 2002
- Then and Now - 2004
- What About Us - 2006
- What About Us (Special Edition) - 2008
- Take It Easy - 2015 [UK only]

=== Singles ===
- The Singles: More Than a Fantasy/Come On Baby - 2003
- Where's The Love (Single) - 2005
- What About Us (CD Single) - 2006
- All That Really Matters (CD Single) - 2007
- Lately - 2008 [US only]
- I Can't Stop - 2008 [US only]
- Brokeazz (Radio Edit) - 2010
- Cuz I Gotta Know (Souled Out Mix) - 2010 [UK only]
