= Enzo Mainardi =

Italian painter and poet (1898–1983)

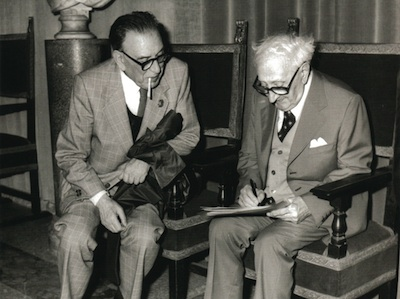
- Enzo Mainardi (left) with Francesco Cangiullo
- Born: July 30, 1898; Ticengo
- Died: November 16, 1983 (aged 85); Cremona
- Known for: Painting, poetry
- Movement: Futurism

Enzo Mainardi (30 July 1898 – 16 November 1983) was an Italian painter and poet and member of the Futurist movement from Cremona.

Mainardi was born in Ticengo in 1898. He lived in Cremona for most of his life and died there in 1983. He joined the Futurist movement in 1914, having met founder Filippo Tommaso Marinetti at a demonstration. He published his first collection of poems, Preludi in 1919. This included his best-known poem, "Il mio sogno" (my dream). Lines from this poem, "Vedrete la musica / Ascolterete i colori" (you will see the music / you will hear the colours), were quoted in the subtitle to Walt Disney's Fantasia.

Other poems by Mainardi that have been translated into English include "La donna magnetica" (magnetic woman) and "Jazz-Band".

He began painting very young. His most important paintings include "Il Fantino" (the jockey, 1918), "La donna illogica" (the illogical woman, 1922), "Rigogolo rosso" (red oriole, 1922), "L'uomo di carta" del 1924" (the paper man, 1924), and "Lettera E" (the letter E, 1924).

He was the father of Danilo Mainardi.

== Paintings ==
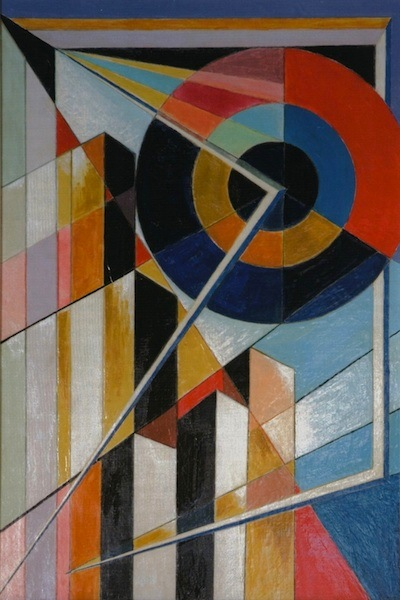
