= 1933 in Italy =

- Decades: 1910s; 1920s; 1930s; 1940s; 1950s
- See also: History of Italy; Timeline of Italian history; List of years in Italy

Events from the year 1933 in Italy.

== Incumbents ==
- King: Victor Emmanuel III.
- Prime Minister: Benito Mussolini

== Events ==
- 15 July – Italy signs the Four-Power Pact with Britain, France and Germany.

== Births ==
- 12 January – Liliana Cavani, film director and screenwriter
- 4 March – John Ciaccia, Italian-Canadian politician (died 2018 in Canada)
- 24 June – Mariano Antonelli, sports shooter
- 26 June – Claudio Abbado, conductor (died 2014)
- 29 June – Piero Barucci, academic
- 1 August – Antonio Negri, political philosopher (died 2023 in France)
- 25 August – Roberto De Simone, stage director and composer (died 2025)

== Deaths ==
- 10 January – Roberto Mantovani, geologist (born 1854)
- 14 March – Antonio Garbasso, physicist, politician (born 1871)
- 18 March – Prince Luigi Amedeo, Duke of the Abruzzi, mountaineer, explorer and admiral (born 1873)
- 2 September – Francesco de Pinedo, aviator (born 1890; flying accident)
- 10 September
  - Baconin Borzacchini, racing driver (born 1898; motor racing accident)
  - Giuseppe Campari, opera singer, Grand Prix driver (born 1892; motor racing accident)
- 27 November – Cesare Nava, engineer and politician (born 1861)
