= 1938 in Italy =

- Decades: 1910s; 1920s; 1930s; 1940s; 1950s
- See also: History of Italy; Timeline of Italian history; List of years in Italy

Events from the year 1938 in Italy.

== Incumbents ==
- King: Victor Emmanuel III
- Prime Minister: Benito Mussolini

== Events ==
- 30 March – Prime minister Benito Mussolini is granted the same level of power over the Italian military as that of King Victor Emmanuel III, taking the title First Marshal of the Empire.
- 19 June – Italy wins the FIFA World Cup by defeating Hungary, 4–2, in the final game at the Stade Olympique de Colombes in Paris, France.

== Births ==
- 6 January – Adriano Celentano, singer-songwriter, actor and filmmaker
- 7 February – Franco Testa, cyclist, Olympic champion (1960) (died 2025)
- 8 March – Bruno Pizzul, sports journalist (died 2025)
- 21 March – Luigi Tenco, singer-songwriter (died 1967)
- 8 June – Angelo Amato, cardinal (died 2024)
- 21 June – Mario Minieri, road bicycle racer
- 19 July – Sergio Martino, film director and producer
- 16 August – Cosimo Nocera, footballer (died 2012)
- 23 August – Celestina Casapietra, operatic soprano (died 2024)
- 28 August – Maurizio Costanzo, television news reporter (died 2023)

== Deaths ==
- January 4 – Paola Drigo, novelist (born 1876)
- February 9 – Arturo Caprotti, engineer and architect (born 1881)
