= 2016 in Italian television =

This is a list of Italian television related events from 2016.

== Events ==
- 13 May – 26-year-old harmonica player Moses wins the seventh season of Italia's Got Talent.
- 23 May – Alice Paba wins the fourth season of The Voice of Italy.

== Debuts ==
=== RAI ===
==== Serials ====
- L'allieva ("The pupil") – by various directors, with Alessandra Mastronardi and Lino Guanciale, from the Alessia Gazzola's novels; 3 seasons (till now). It's the most successful among the Italian forensic dramas and has for protagonist Alice Allievi, a young would-be coroner, professionally capable but maladroit in the private life.
- Medici, by various directors, with Richard Madden (Cosimo de' Medici), Daniel Sharman (Lorenzo il Magnifico) and Dustin Hoffman (Giovanni di Bicci de Medici); 3 seasons (till now); coproduction with Great Britain. The series, despite its great production values, gets mixed critics, moreover for the excessive historical inaccuracies.
- The mafia kills only in summer, by Luca Ribuoli, with Claudio Gioè, Licia Foglietta and Pif (as the teller), from the Pif's movie; 2 seasons.
- Thou shalt not kill, procedural set in Turin, with Miriam Leone and Monica Guerritore; 2 seasons.
- Rocco Schiavone – procedural set in Aosta, from the Antonio Manzini's novels, with Marco Giallini in the title role, an unruly and contemptuous but gifted deputy-commissioner, transferred from Rome as a punishment; 4 seasons (till now).

== Television shows ==
=== Drama ===
- Io non mi arrendo ("I don't give up") – by Enzo Monteleone, with Beppe Fiorello; 2 episodes. A police inspector fights against both the traffic of toxic waste and a cancer gotten because his field investigations.
- Io sono Libero ("I'm Libero, or I'm free") – docudrama by Francesco Micicchè, with Adriano Chiaramida as Libero Grassi.
- Luisa Spagnoli – biopic by Ludovico Gasparini, with Luisa Ranieri in the title role; 2 episodes.

==== Serials ====
- Come fai sbagli ("Everything you do, you wrong") – by Riccardo Donna and Tiziana Aristarco, remake of the French Fais pas ci, fais pas ça, with Daniele Pecci, Francesca Inaudi and Caterina Guzzanti; 12 episodes. Two couples of parents raise their sons with opposite methods (authoritarian and permissive), both with disappointing results.

==== News and educational ====
- Alla scoperta dei musei vaticani ("Discovering the Vatican Museums") – by Alberto Angela; 3 episodes.

=== 2000s ===
- Grande Fratello (2000–present)
- Ballando con le stelle (2005–present)
- X Factor (2008–present)

=== 2010s ===
- Italia's Got Talent (2010–present)
- The Voice of Italy (2013–present)

== Networks and services ==
=== Launches ===
Network	Type	Launch date	Notes	Source
Paramount Network	Cable and satellite	1 October		
VH1	Cable and satellite	1 July		

=== Conversions and rebrandings ===
Old network name	New network name	Type	Conversion Date	Notes	Source
Paramount Network	Cable and satellite	1 October			

=== Closures ===
Network	Type	Closure date	Notes	Source
Nuvolari	Nuvola61	Cable and satellite	Unknown	

== See also ==
- 2016 in Italy
- List of Italian films of 2016
