= Then and Now (Livin Out Loud album) =

Then And Now

Studio album by Livin Out Loud
- Released: June 22, 2004
- Genre: R&B, Hip-Hop, Pop, Rock
- Length: 64:18
- Label: Kin Productions

Livin Out Loud chronology
Live at Humphrey's (2002)	Then And Now (2004)	What About Us (2006)

Singles from Then and Now
- 1. "More Than a Fantasy" Released: January 31, 2003; 2. "You Make Me Smile" Released: January 31, 2003; 3. "Come On Baby" Released: January 31, 2003; 4. "Why U Gotta Lie (UK only)" 5. "I Can't Stop (US only)" Released: 2008; 6. "Brokeass (Radio Edit)" Released: February 1, 2010; 7. "Cuz I Gotta Know (UK only)" Released: 2010

Then and Now is the second studio album by American R&B group Livin Out Loud. "More Than a Fantasy" was the first hit from the album. The album received further attention when the singles "Why U Gotta Lie" and "Cuz I Gotta Know" surged into popularity with UK Urban and Dance listeners.

The songs "I Can't Stop," "You Make Me Smile" and "Cuz I Gotta Know (Souled Out Mix)" appear on the UK release of their 2015 album, Take It Easy.

== Track listing ==
Number	Song title	Length
1.	More Than a Fantasy	3:18
2.	'Cuz That's The Way	4:20
3.	You Make Me Smile	3:22
4.	Why U Gotta Lie - Reggae Hall	3:28
5.	Cuz I Gotta Know	4:16
6.	I Can't Stop	3:43
7.	Slip Into You're Groove	4:44
8.	LoveJoy	3:25
9.	Prelude to the Revolution	0:21
10.	Revolution	3:54
11.	Brokeass	4:05
12.	Why U Gotta Lie - Radio	3:32
13.	You Gotta Leave	3:45
14.	Come On Baby	3:50
15.	Bonus- When Can We Get Together Live	4:36
16.	Bonus- More Than a Fantasy—Club Mix	4:06
17.	Bonus- Come On Baby - Slow Jam	5:33

Alternative cover
