= Evloghios (Hessler) =

German-born Italian religious figure (1935-2019)

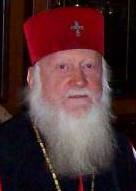
Evloghios (Hessler)

Evloghios (Hessler) (secular name Klaus Augustin Hessler; February 21, 1935 – January 20, 2019) was Archbishop of Milan and Longobardia and Metropolitan of Aquileia and Western Europe, and Primate of the Holy Synod of Milan.

He was ordained a deacon in 1971; he was a bishop by 1986 and was elected Metropolitan in 1990.

The Holy Synod of Milan is not recognized by any mainstream Eastern Orthodox Church, therefore the church and its members are not in communion with any mainstream Eastern Orthodox denomination worldwide.
