= Zaccaria Cometti =

Italian footballer (1937–2020)

Personal information
- Full name: Zaccaria Cometti
- Date of birth: 7 January 1937
- Place of birth: Romano di Lombardia, Kingdom of Italy
- Date of death: 2 April 2020 (aged 83)
- Place of death: Romano di Lombardia, Italy
- Position: Goalkeeper

Youth career
- 195?–1956: US Fiorita
- 1956–1957: Atalanta

Senior career*
Years	Team	Apps	(Gls)
1957–1970	Atalanta	178	(0)
1970–1972	Trento	76	(0)

Managerial career
- 1975–1977: Atalanta Youth
- 1977–1990: Atalanta (assistant)
- 1990–1992: Atalanta (goalkeeping coach)
- * Club domestic league appearances and goals

Zaccaria Cometti (7 January 1937 – 2 April 2020) was an Italian professional footballer.

== Biography ==
He spent the majority of his career at Atalanta in Serie A.

Cometti died from COVID-19 on 2 April 2020.
