= Mario Gerla =

Italian computer scientist and engineer (1943–2019)

Mario Gerla (1943–2019) was an Italian computer scientist and engineer, Distinguished Professor, Jonathan B. Postel Chair and Chair of the Department (2015–2018) of Computer Science of University of California, Los Angeles (UCLA). He co-authored 11 books. He died in 2019.

== Academic career ==
He attended and graduated with an engineering degree (1966) from Polytechnic University of Milan and received his Master's (1970) and Ph.D. (1973) degrees in Computer Science from UCLA, studying under faculty advisor Leonard Kleinrock. He joined the UCLA faculty in 1976. At UCLA, he was the director of Center for Autonomous Intelligent Networks and also Network Research Lab.

Gerla was elected as an ACM Fellow in 2018 for "contributions to design and analysis of mobile wireless protocols for vehicular safety and traffic applications".

In 2003, Gerla was elevated to IEEE fellow for contributions to ad hoc wireless networks.
