= Murder of Sara Di Pietrantonio =

2016 murder in Italy

- Location: 1090 Via della Magliana, Rome, Italy
- Date: 29 May 2016; 3:00AM - 5:00 AM
- Deaths: 1
- Victim: Sara Di Pietrantonio
- Perpetrator: Vincenzo Paduan
- Motive: Jealousy

The murder of Sara Di Pietrantonio was a femicide that occurred on 29 May 2016 in Rome, Italy. The young woman was stalked and burned alive by her ex-boyfriend Vincenzo Paduano. For the crime he was sentenced to life imprisonment.

== Chronology of events ==
Sara Di Pietrantonio was a young woman from Rome of around 22 years old. She was a student at the Faculty of Economics of Roma Tre University and resident in the hamlet of Spallette. She was in the process of ending a conflictual relationship with Vincenzo Paduano, a security guard five years older than her, which had lasted about two years. They met in the summer of 2014 and got engaged. The couple had argued numerous times, even heatedly, interrupting their relationship on at least three occasions.

On the morning of 29 May 2016, between 3:00 and 5:00AM, Paduano, after having followed his ex-girlfriend, rammed her car along Via della Magliana in an uninhabited area, forcing her to stop, after which Paduano entered the girl's car and, after an argument between the two, poured a flammable liquid. In the meantime, the girl fled and sought the help of some passing motorists, who however, did not stop. Paduano then gave chase and, after probably strangling her, doused her and set her on fire. He subsequently also set the girl's car on fire which was found around 5:00 on 29 May by the firefighters who then alerted the State Police Mobile Squad. It was her mother who recognized her, who had left the house to look for her.

The funeral took place on the 10th June at the church of Santa Maria Madre della Divina Grazia in Ponte Galeria.

== Process ==
Paduano was arrested the day after the discovery; after initially denying involvement in the murder, he confessed to having stalked her and killed her out of jealousy, as the girl had become involved in a new romantic relationship.

The first-instance trial, which took place with an abbreviated trial, which ended on 5 May 2017 with a life sentence for voluntary homicide; the sentence was then reduced to 30 years of imprisonment on appeal on 10 May 2018. The appeal sentence was then annulled by the Supreme Court of Cassation on 12 April 2019 for a redetermination of the sentence, leading to the reinstatement of the life sentence and the recognition of the aggravating circumstances of premeditation, futile motives and diminished defence as well as the other two crimes, namely destruction of a corpse and stalking.

== Reactions ==
Along Via della Magliana, a small green area dedicated to the girl was created with the name of Giardino di Sara, while in the Spallette hamlet, between Via Siligo and Via Arzana, a park dedicated to her memory was created between 2020 and 2022.

In 2017 Stefano Pistolini, Giuseppe Scarpa and Daniele Autieri wrote a documentary film entitled Sara, directed by Massimo Salvucci and Stefano Pistolini. The documentary film was presented at the 2017 Rome Film Festival (in the presence of Sara's mother, Dacia Maraini and Francesca Puglisi) and was screened at the Tor Bella Monaca theatre as well as at the Palazzo Montecitorio, and was then broadcast on television for the first time on Real Time on 25 November 2017.

On 20 December 2022, an anti-violence center dedicated to Sara Di Pietrantonio was inaugurated at Roma Tre University. Subsequently, on 11 October 2024, at the Department of Business Economics of the same university in via Silvio D'Amico, in the Ostiense district, a mural in memory of Sara Di Pietrantonio was inaugurated, created by the artist Luis Gomez de Teran.

One of the anti-violence centers of Rome Capital at the offices of the Municipio VII in via Tommaso Fortifiocca has been dedicated to Sara Di Pietrantonio.

Sara Di Pietrantonio's mother Tina Raccuia is an advocate for victims.

== See also ==
- Clarke family murders, car-arson femicide case in Australia
