= Angelo Ziccardi =

Italian politician (1928–2019)

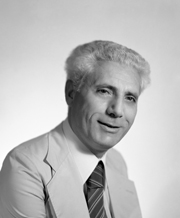
Angelo Ziccardi

Angelo Ziccardi (1 May 1928 – 6 January 2019) was an Italian politician who served as a Senator between 1972 and 1983.
