= Il Liberatore =

- Type: Underground publication
- Editor: Michele Rossi
- Managing editor: Silvano Bensasson
- Founded: 1935
- Political alignment: Communist
- Language: Italian language

Il Liberatore ('The Liberator') was an Italian language underground publication issued by the Italian section of the Tunisian Communist Party. Il Liberatore appeared in 1935, after the antifascist weekly Domani had been banned. The manager was Silvano Bensasson and editor was Michele Rossi, two well-known Italian anti-fascists.
