= Giovanni Piana =

Italian philosopher (1940–2019)

- Born: 5 April 1940; Casale Monferrato, [Italy
- Died: 27 February 2019 (aged 78); Praia a Mare, Italy

Philosophical work
- Era: 20th-century philosophy
- Region: Western Philosophy
- School: Phenomenology
- Main interests: Music, aesthetics, epistemology
- Notable ideas: "The true philosophy tends to the elementary"

Giovanni Piana (5 April 1940 – 27 February 2019) was an Italian philosopher. He taught theoretical philosophy at the University of Milan from 1970 to 1999.

He was a disciple of Enzo Paci and wrote his dissertation on Husserl's unpublished works.

His philosophical position is characterised by the concept of phenomenology ("phenomenological structuralism") influenced by Husserl, Wittgenstein, and Bachelard. His thought was oriented towards the philosophy of knowledge, the philosophy of music, and the fields of perception and imagination.

== Selected bibliography ==
=== Books ===
- Philosophy of Music and its Aims. A Brief Account
- Esistenza e storia negli inediti di Husserl, Lampugnani Nigri, Milano 1965. English translation by A. Roda, History and Existence in Husserl's Manuscripts, in "Telos", n. 13, 1972.
- I problemi della fenomenologia, Mondadori, Milano 1966.
- Interpretazione del Tractatus di Wittgenstein, Il Saggiatore, Milano 1973 (2nd edition, Guerini e Associati, 1993).
- Elementi di una dottrina dell'esperienza, Il Saggiatore, Milano, 1979.
- La notte dei lampi. Quattro saggi sulla filosofia dell'immaginazione, Guerini e Associati, Milano,1988
- Filosofia della musica, Guerini e Associati, Milano 1991 (3rd print in 1995, later released in CC). Translation to Portuguese (Brazil): A filosofia da Música, Edusc, Bauru 2001.
- Mondrian e la musica, Milano, Guerini e Associati, 1995.
- Teoria del sogno e dramma musicale. La metafisica della musica di Schopenhauer, Guerini e Associati, Milano 1997.
- Numero e figura. Idee per una epistemologia della ripetizione. Cuem, Milano 1999.
- Alle origini della teoria della tonalità, 2005.

== Papers quoting Piana's works ==
- "Striking sentences in Giovanni Piana's Complete works"
- "Giovanni Piana's "Conversazioni" and some recent controversies on Husserl's "Krisis""
- "Giovanni Piana on musical meaning"
- "Materials for a lexicographic analysis of Giovanni Piana's Complete works"
- Bibliografia sull’estetica fenomenologica italiana 1900–1996
- Cosmologia arcaica - Il triangolo di Sarngadeva
- Fenomenologia, coscienza del tempo e analisi musicale
- Le variazioni antropologico-culturali dei significati simbolici dei colori
- Zero, uno e gli «altri» numeri: Husserl e la tradizione empirista
- Burnout e risorse in Musicoterapia
- La crisi delle scienze fisiche fra Ottocento e Novecento: interpretazioni filosofiche
- Aldo Scimone, Lezioni sui Fondamenti della Matematica

== International journals special issues entirely devoted to Piana ==
- Phenomenological Reviews: Special issue in memory of Giovanni Piana
- Eikasia: La fenomenología en Italia: Giovanni Piana
