= Domenico Bova =

Italian politician (1946–2019)

Domenico Bova (22 November 1946 – 9 July 2019) was an Italian politician who served as a Deputy between 1994 and 2006.
