= 2016 in Italy =

- Decades: 1990s; 2000s; 2010s; 2020s; 2030s
- See also: History of Italy; Timeline of Italian history; List of years in Italy

The following lists events that have happened in 2016 in the Italian Republic.

== Incumbents ==
- President: Sergio Mattarella
- Prime Minister: Matteo Renzi (until 12 December), Paolo Gentiloni (starting 12 December)

== Events ==
=== January ===
- 4 January : the car manufacturer Ferrari enters the Milan Stock Exchange in Piazza Affari with its own share.
- 9 January: Murder of Ashley Ann Olsen in Florence
- 21-24 January: 2015–16 Biathlon World Cup – World Cup 6 in Rasen-Antholz

=== February ===
- 3 February: the murder of Giulio Regeni, an Italian researcher kidnapped on the previous 25 January, is discovered in Egypt

=== April ===
- 2 April - 12 September - Triennial 2016
- 4-10 April - 2016 IIHF Women's World Championship Division I Group B in Asiago

=== May ===
- 6-29 May: 2016 Giro d'Italia
- 11 May: the Cirinnà law for same-sex civil unions is approved.
- 29 May: Murder of Sara Di Pietrantonio in Rome

=== June ===
- 1 June: inauguration of the Gotthard Base Tunnel, the longest high-speed rail tunnel in the world.
- 2 June: 70th anniversary of the Italian Republic.

=== July ===
- 12 July - Andria-Corato train collision

=== August ===
- 21 August: Olympic Italy concludes the Rio Olympics, totaling 28 medals.
- 24 August: August 2016 Central Italy earthquake

=== October ===
- 26 October: earthquake measuring 5.9 on the Richter scale in Central Italy with its epicenter between Castelsantangelo sul Nera, Visso and Ussita.
- 30 October: Earthquake measuring 6.5 on the Richter scale in Central Italy with its epicenter between Norcia and Preci.

=== December ===
- 7 December: Prime Minister Matteo Renzi resigns in the hands of the President of the Republic Sergio Mattarella following the defeat in the referendum on 4 December.
- 12 December: Paolo Gentiloni assumes the office of President of the Council of Ministers.
- 22 December: the Salerno-Reggio Calabria motorway is completed and renamed the Mediterranean motorway.

== Deaths ==
- January 7 – Valerio Zanone, 79, politician
- January 14 – Franco Citti, 80, actor
- January 19 – Ettore Scola, 84, director
- February 19 – Umberto Eco, 82, philosopher and semiotician
- March 25 – Paolo Poli, 86, theatre actor
- May 19 – Marco Pannella, 86, politician
- May 28 – Giorgio Albertazzi, 92, actor and director
- June 5 – Gianluca Buonanno, 50, politician
- June 27 – Bud Spencer, 86, actor
- July 13 – Bernardo Provenzano, 83, criminal and chief of the Sicilian Mafia
- September 16 – Carlo Azeglio Ciampi, 95, former President
- October 13 – Dario Fo, 90, actor and Nobel Prize laureate
- November 1 – Tina Anselmi, 89, politician
- November 8 – Umberto Veronesi, 90, scientist

== See also ==
- 2016 in Italian television
- List of Italian films of 2016
