= Pasquale Panìco =

Italian politician

Pasquale Panìco (10 May 1926 – 21 January 2018) was an Italian politician who was a Senator from 1979 to 1992.
