= Fernando Aiuti =

Italian immunologist and politician (1935–2019)

- Born: 8 June 1935; Urbino, Italy
- Died: 9 January 2019 (aged 83); Rome, Italy
- Education: Sapienza University of Rome
- Known for: Founder and first president of ANLAIDS Association
- Scientific career
- Fields: Immunology

Fernando Aiuti (8 June 1935 – 9 January 2019) was an Italian immunologist and politician. He was the founder and first President of ANLAIDS Association.

== Early life and education ==
Born in Urbino in 1935, he graduated with a degree in medicine from Sapienza University of Rome.

== Career ==
In 1991, during a congress at the Fair in Cagliari, the possibility of AIDS being transmitted orally was being discussed. Aiuti suddenly took Rosaria Iardino, an HIV-positive woman, and kissed her on the mouth, trying to convince public opinion that the virus could not be transmitted orally. A journalist photographed the scene and this photo became internationally famous.

In 2007, his colleague Barbara Ensoli sued him for defamation, seeking $2.5 million in damages after Aiuti had criticized the way the Phase I trial of the AIDS vaccine had been conducted.

Aiuti was head of The People of Freedom list in 2008 for the Campidoglio, and was elected to the municipal council of Rome for The People of Freedom with the mayor Gianni Alemanno, until 2013.

He was appointed chief within the health policies commission of the Roma municipality (2008–2013), where he spoke out against the closing of the public hospital San Giacomo degli Incurabili.

He was full professor at Sapienza University and, in 2010, he was there appointed emeritus professor.

Aiuti died on 9 January 2019 due to an accidental fall at the Gemelli Polyclinic, where he was hospitalized for an ischemic heart disease.

== Documentaires ==
- 2010: "+ o – il sesso confuso. Racconti di mondi nell'era AIDS", direct. Andrea Adriatico and Giulio Maria Corbelli
