= Francesco Mainardi =

Italian physicist and mathematician (born 1942)

- Born: December 29, 1942 (age 83); Lugo, Italy
- Education: University of Bologna
- Scientific career
- Fields: Mathematical physics
- Workplaces: Free University of Berlin; Courant Institute of Mathematical Sciences; University of Aarhus; University of KwaZulu-Natal; University of Sydney
- Website: www.fracalmo.org/mainardi/

Francesco Mainardi (born December 29, 1942) is an Italian physicist and mathematician.

== Early life ==
Mainardi was born in Lugo, Italy, on December 29, 1942. He graduated from the University of Bologna in 1966 with a degree in theoretical physics.

== Career ==
Mainardi became a professor of mathematical physics at Bologna. From 1971 to 1973, he was a lecturer at the Marche Polytechnic University on rational mechanics. He teaches non-Gaussian stochastics and mathematics among other science-related subjects. He has offered courses on statistical mechanics and fractional calculus. From January 24–28, 2000, he worked for the Center for Mathematical Physics and Stochastic at the University of Aarhus, Denmark.

== Publications ==
In 1982, he was the editor of Wave Propagation in Viscoelastic Media, which was published by Pitman Publishing in London. In September 1996, he and A. Carpinteri authored Scaling Laws and Fractality in Continuum Mechanics. A year later. Mainard and Carpinteri co-edited Fractals and Fractional Calculus in Continuum Mechanics. He went on hiatus until 2010 when the Imperial College Press issued Fractional Calculus and Waves in Linear Viscoelasticity in London . Then in 2022 World Scientific (Singapore) has published the second (revised and enlarged) edition of this book. In 2011, he co-authored (with S. Rogosin), The Legacy of A.Ya. Khintchine's Work in Probability Theory..For Springer Monographs in Mathematics Springer he has published the book "Mittag-Leffler Functions, Related Topics and Applications" with R. Gorenflo, A.A. Kilbas and S. Rogosin in two editions, 2014 and 2020.

== Works abroad ==
He gave lectures abroad at institutions such as the Indian Institute of Science of Bangalore, International Centre of Mathematical Sciences of Palai in India, the Free University of Berlin. He worked at the Courant Institute of Mathematical Sciences in New York City and at the Institute of Oceanography of San Diego. He was a lecturer at the University of Sydney and then worked at the University of KwaZulu-Natal of South Africa. In Brazil, worked at the University of Campinas in applied mathematics.
