= Giuseppe Frigo =

Italian judge (1935–2019)

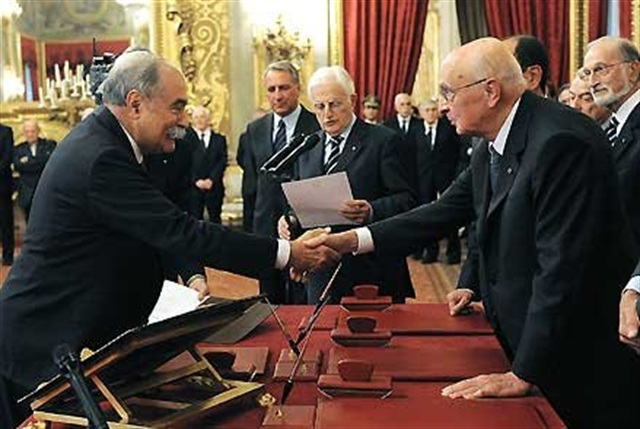
- Giuseppe Frigo (left) with Italian President Giorgio Napolitano (right)

Judge of the Constitutional Court of Italy
- In office 23 October 2008 – 7 November 2016
- Nominated by: Italian Parliament

Personal details
- Born: 30 March 1935 Brescia, Italy
- Died: 7 December 2019 (aged 84) Brescia, Italy

Giuseppe Frigo (30 March 1935 – 7 December 2019) was an Italian judge. He was a judge on the Constitutional Court of Italy from 23 October 2008 to 7 November 2016.

== Career ==
Frigo was born in Brescia. He was elected to the Constitutional Court by the Italian Parliament with 689 out of 952 votes on 21 October 2008, and he was sworn in two days later. He retired on 7 November 2016, citing health reasons. He died on 7 December 2019 in Brescia.

Frigo was made Knight Grand Cross in the Order of Merit of the Italian Republic on 27 October 2008.
