= Massimo Marino (TV presenter) =

Italian television presenter and actor (1960–2019)

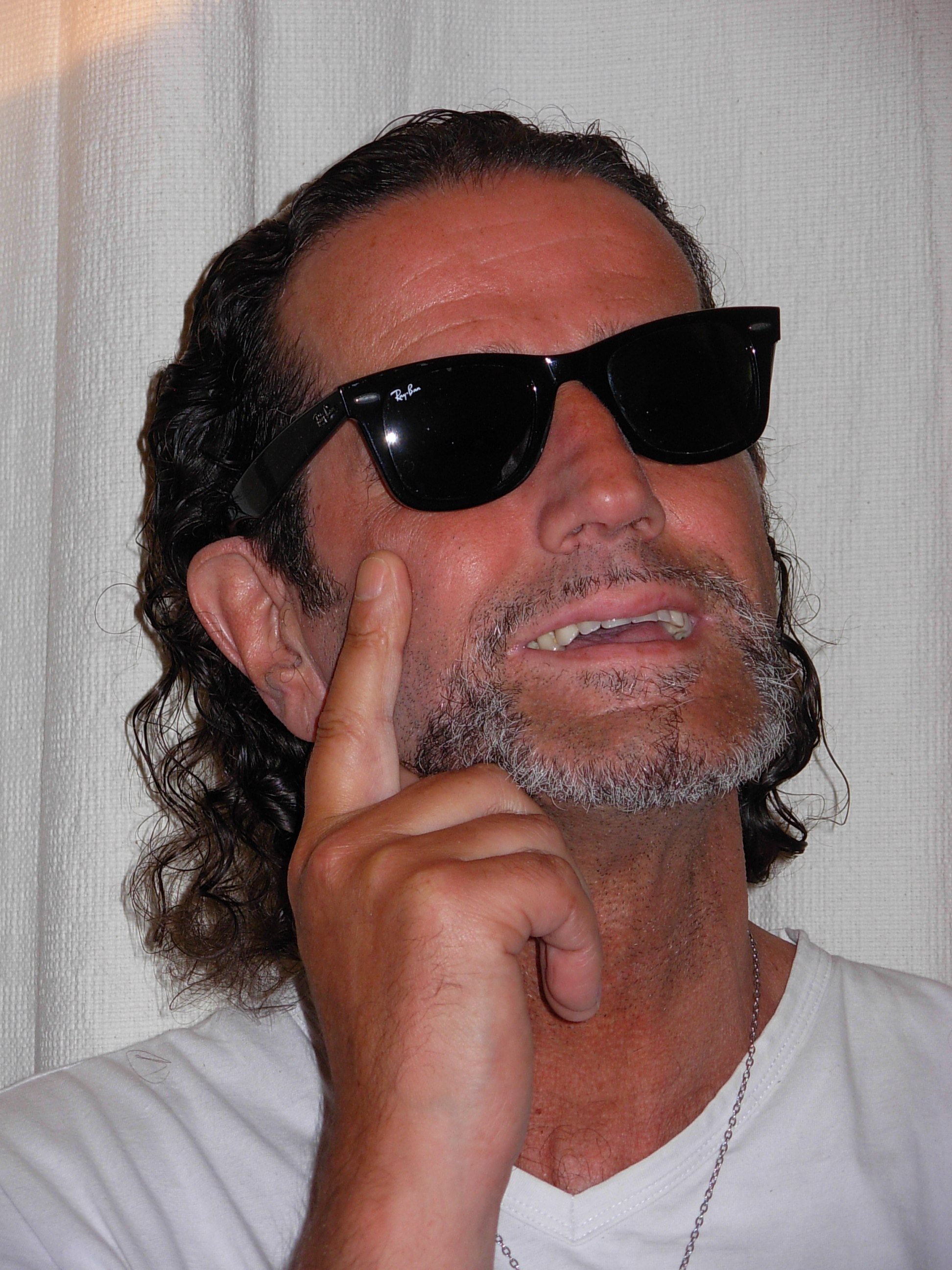
- Marino in May 2012
- Born: 6 February 1960; Rome, Italy
- Died: 19 April 2019 (aged 59); Rome, Italy
- Occupations: Actor, television presenter
- Years active: 1995-2019
- Height: 1.80 m (5 ft 11 in)

Massimo Marino (8 February 1960 – 19 April 2019) was an Italian television presenter and actor. He made his television debut in 1995, conducting the ViviRoma television program on the Teleambiente and Teledonna stations. Between 2009 and 2010, he was a guest on several television programs, including La vita in diretta, while Rai 3 dedicated a service to him in an episode of Gente di Notte in 2005. He was a guest of Simona Ventura in La Grande Notte on Monday. He was the protagonist in The Ten Commandments of episode entitled "Arrivederci Roma" on 12 September 2015, presented by Domenico Iannacone.

In 2008, Marino made his cinema debut in the film Grande, grosso e ... Verdone, followed by Una estate al mare (2008), A Natale mi sposo (2010) and Una cella in due e Matrimonio a Parigi (2011). Since 1989, Marino was a publisher of the free press magazine ViviRoma.

Marino died in Rome on 19 April 2019, at the age of 59.
