= Danilo Mainardi =

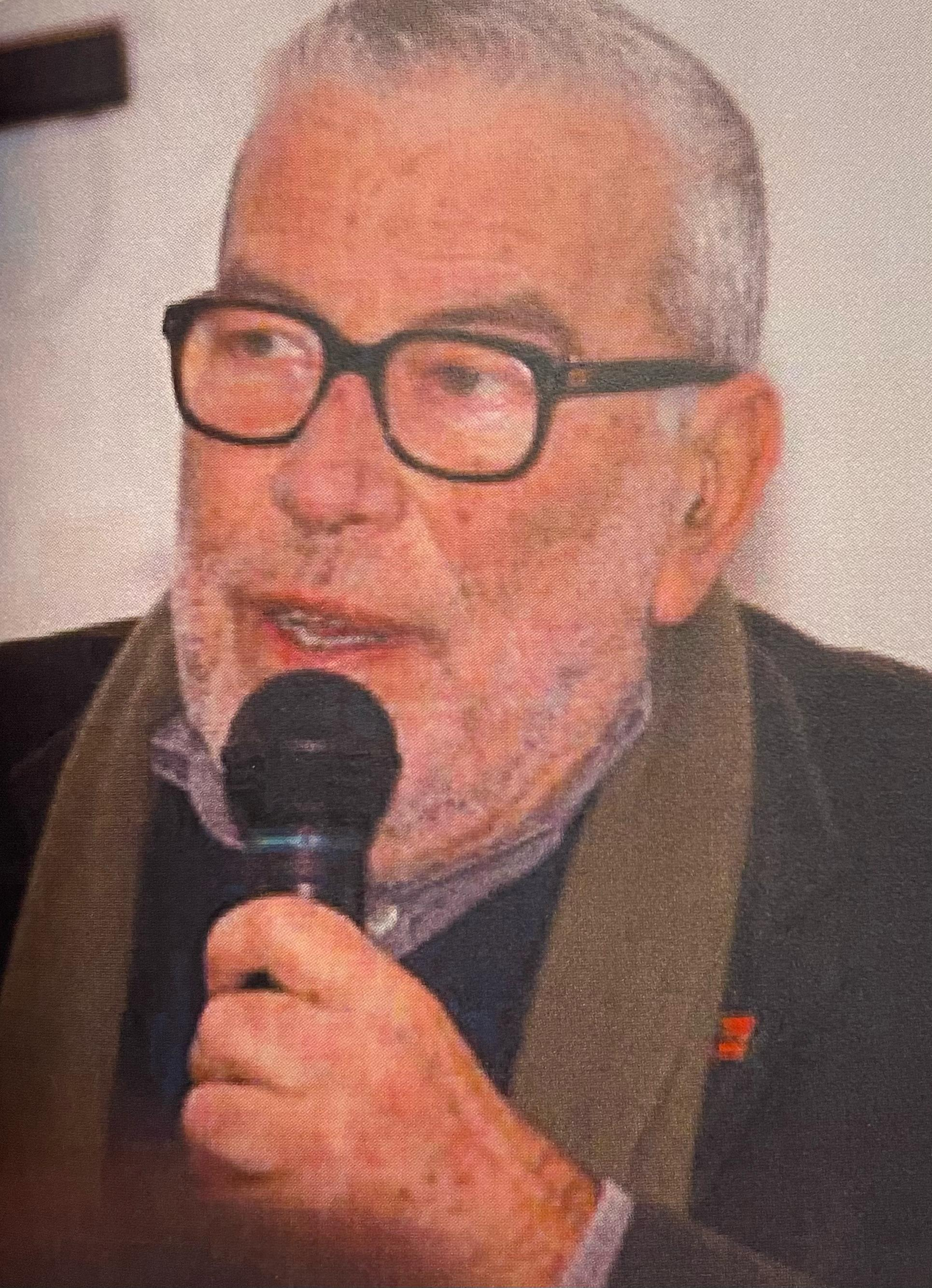
- Born: 25 November 1933; Milan, Italy
- Died: 8 March 2017 (aged 83); Venice, Italy
- Occupations: Ethologist, scholar and writer

Danilo Mainardi (25 November 1933 – 8 March 2017) was an Italian ethologist, scholar, and writer. His father was Enzo Mainardi, a painter/poet and member of the Futurist movement.

== Bibliography ==
- 1974 - L'animale culturale (The cultural animal), BUR (ISBN 8817120480)
- 1975 - La scelta sessuale nell'evoluzione della specie, Bollati Boringhieri (ISBN 9788833903200)
- 1989 - Novanta animali, Bollati Boringhieri (ISBN 9788833904900)
- 1991 - Animali e uomini, Il Cigno Galileo Galilei
- 1991 - Galapagos e Patagonia. Sulle orme di Darwin, Il Cigno Galileo Galilei
- 1991 - Etologia & protezione animale, Editoriale Grasso (ISBN 8870551180)]
- 1992 - Il cane e la volpe, Einaudi (ISBN 9788806124519)
- 1992 - Dizionario di Etologia, Einaudi (ISBN 9788806130275)
- 1994 - Lo zoo aperto, Einaudi (ISBN 880613535X)
- 1995 - Il corno del rinoceronte, Mondadori (ISBN 9788804406655)
- 1996 - Del cane, del gatto e di altri animali, Mondadori (ISBN 9788804416012)
- 1997 - Gli animali fanno così, Giunti Editore (ISBN 9788809454088)
- 2000 - La strategia dell'aquila (The Strategy of the Eagle), Mondadori (ISBN 9788804490647)
- 2001 - L'animale irrazionale, Mondadori (ISBN 9788804488378)
- 2002 - L'etologia caso per caso, (Case studies in Ethology) Airplane (ISBN 9788883721151)
- 2003 - Arbitri e galline, Mondadori (ISBN 9788804523574)
- 2006 - Nella mente degli animali (In the animals' mind), Cairo Publishing (ISBN 9788860520425)
- 2008 - La bella zoologia (The nice Zoology), Cairo Publishing (ISBN 9788860521484)
- 2009 - L'intelligenza degli animali (The intelligence of animals), Cairo Publishing (ISBN 9788860522153)

=== Publications in English ===
- "Sociobiology: beyond nature/nurture?", American Association Adv.Sc.
- "The biology of aggression", Sijtoff & Nordhoff
- "The behaviour of Human Infant", Plenum
- "Fear and Defence", Harwood
- "Infanticide and Parental care", Harwood
- "Food preferences", Harwood
- "Behavioural ecology of fishes", Harwood
- "Vertebrate mating systems", World Scientific
