= Francesco Smalto =

Italian fashion designer (1927–2015)

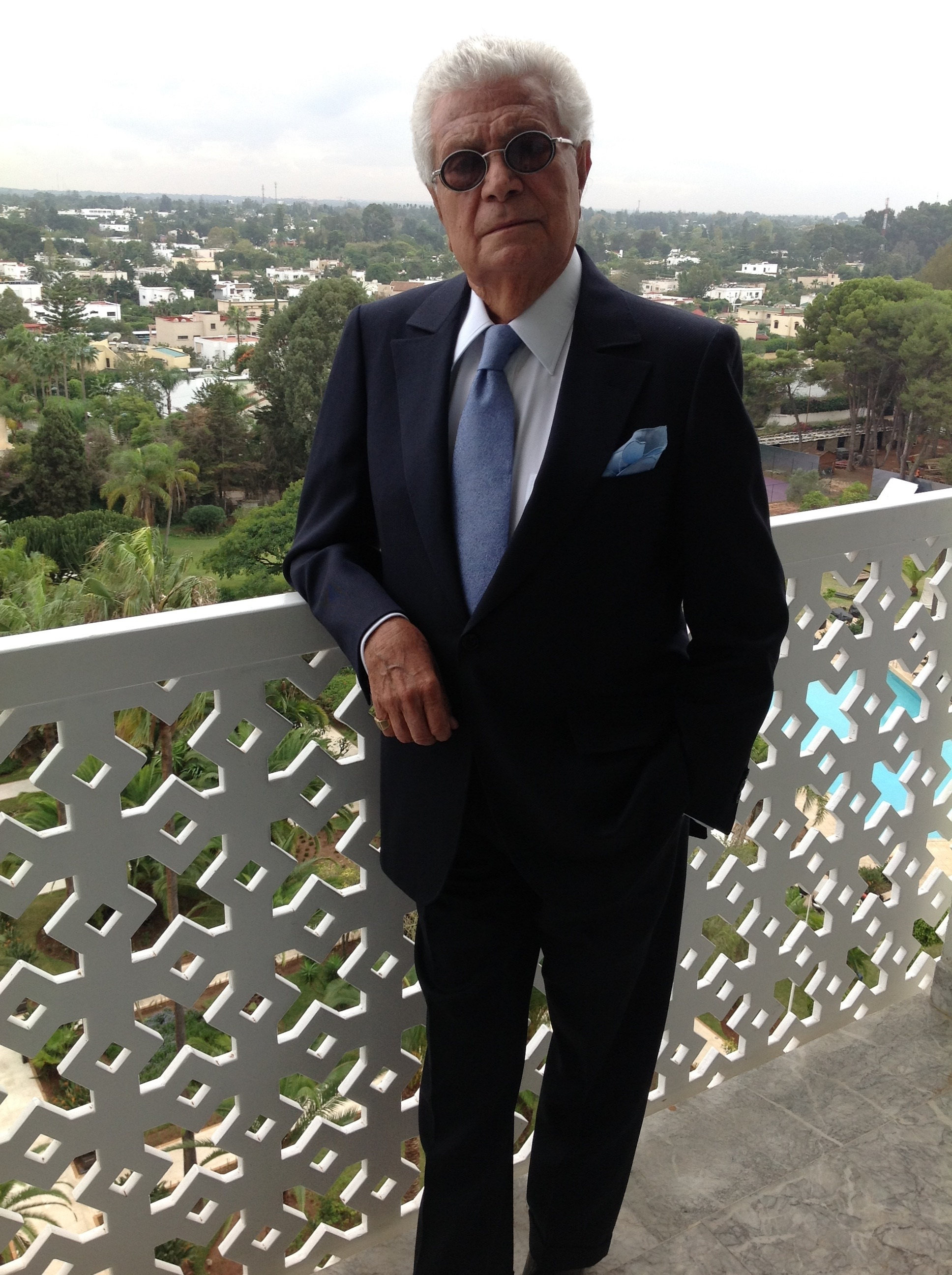
- Francesco Smalto in 2014.
- Born: 5 November 1927; Reggio Calabria, Italy
- Died: 5 April 2015 (aged 87); Marrakesh, Morocco
- Occupation: fashion designer

Francesco Smalto (5 November 1927 – 5 April 2015) was an Italian fashion designer.

Born in Reggio Calabria, Smalto started working in his hometown as a tailor, and he created his first dress when he was 14 years old. In 1962 he started his fashion house in Paris. He dressed many celebrities and also several heads of state, notably François Mitterrand, Charles Aznavour, and King Hassan II of Morocco. In 2001, Smalto retired and sold his brand to Alliance Designers.

At the beginning of March 2019, L'Obs revealed that Jack Lang would have received for nearly 195,600 euros of costumes and trousers from the Italian fashion designer Smalto between 2013 and 2018. His lawyer confirms by stating that "his gifts have never had any counterpart". A preliminary inquiry was opened on March 12 for "abuse of social property".
