= De-Javu =

- Origin: Italy
- Genres: Eurohouse, House, Eurodance
- Years active: 2001–2003
- Labels: Definitiva, WEA
- Past members: Dario Melodia; Riccardo Piparo; Francesco Abbate; Alessandro Bunetto; Paul Kass (Paul K.)

De-Javu was an Italian eurohouse/house project founded by Dario Melodia, Riccardo Piparo, Francesco Abbate and Alessandro Bunetto.

== History ==
De-Javu released their debut track, "I Can't Stop" in 2001. The project consisted of Dario Melodia, Riccardo Piparo, Francesco Abbate and Alessandro Bunetto, and Paul Kass, many of whom had already achieved significant success in the music industry. The track gained immense notoriety in the European house-music scene.

Dario Melodia has been working on radio for a long time. Since 1995, he has produced dance projects for the Italian divisions of the well-known labels Virgin and EMI. His tracks have been included in prestigious compilations such as "Festivalbar 99". He is also known as a member of the band 'Contact Three" and continues to create remixes, remaining one of the most popular Italian DJs. In 2001, he met Francesco Abbate and Alessandro Bunetto. However, before the De-Javu project appeared, their fate brought them together with Riccardo Piparo, an experienced producer and musician. This meeting led to the creation of the touching song "I Can't Stop", which was performed by Paul Kass (Paul K.).

Paul Kass (Paul K) was born in New York City. In college, he sang in the school band and was even invited to join the local church choir. At the age of 16, his family moved to Italy, where he began performing in pubs and clubs. Paul Kass (Paul K.) wrote poetry for his own songs and taught English. In Sicily, he met Dario Melodia, who invited him to join the band. Thanks to this project, De-Javu has found his unique voice. The debut video was shot in Los Angeles, and the song "I Can't Stop" became a hit on the dance floors of Europe.

In May of 2002, De-Javu released the single "Never", which was widely broadcast worldwide, but did not achieve the same commercial success as their previous work. At the same time, vocalist Paul Kass (Paul K.) presented his solo single titled "Do You Believe".

In 2003, De-Javu released her last single, "Trapped". However, this release did not enter the charts and did not receive recognition.

The project has is on a sabbatical effectively disbanded and has not released any new songs since 2003.

== Discography ==
=== Singles ===
Year	Single	HUN	ROM	SUI	U.S. Dance	Album
2001	"I Can't Stop"	7	7	93	37	Singles only
2002	"Never"	—	85	—	—	Singles only
2003	"Trapped"	—	—	—	—	Singles only

"I Can't Stop" music video was released by Warner Music.
