= Michele Caccavale =

Italian politician (1947–2019)

Michele Caccavale (13 July 1947 – 2 January 2019) was an Italian politician who served as a Deputy between 1994 and 1996.

== Biography ==
High school diploma, bank clerk, resident in Nettuno.

Following his involvement with the Christian Democracy (Italy) party, he was elected in March 1994 as a representative of Forza Italia in the Lazio constituency of Pomezia. After clashing with the party leadership, he was not re-elected in the subsequent elections in 1996.

He died in January 2019 at the age of 71 following an illness.
