= Giampiero Cotti Cometti =

Italian geographer

Giampiero Cotti Cometti (11 January 1935 – 31 December 2009) was an Italian geographer and Marxist, who studied problems of the Third World as well as the mountains.

== Biography ==
Giampiero was born in Lovere. He was a professor of Geography at the University of Turin from 1976 until his death, in Milan, in 2009.

Giampiero dedicated much of his time to translating many texts and geographical manuals from the Russian Academy of Sciences, which he believed was the most advanced level of research and teaching of geography.

To make geographical texts available to aspiring geographers, both for research and teaching, he founded the Cesviet publishing house.

As an advertising journalist Giampiero wrote numerous articles for the 'Page of Science' of the Corriere della Sera (1964–1965).

He is also the author of the voices of Asia, Sahara, Burma, Cambodia, Laos, and Thailand.

== Works ==
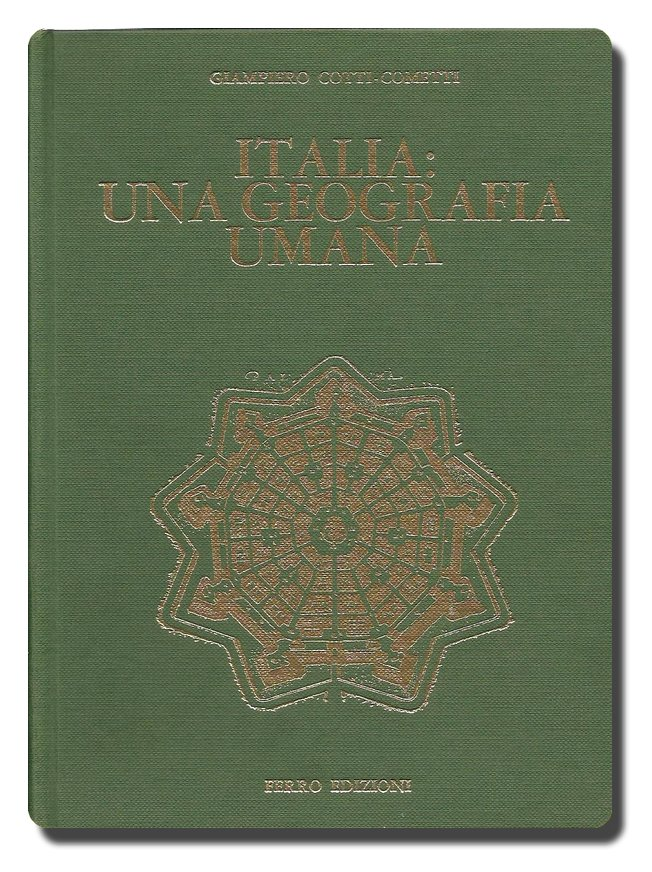
Italy: A human geography, Ferro Edizioni, Milan, 1970, 484 pp.

- Problems of geography of the Third World, ESI, Naples, 1967, 364 pp.
- Archive for Vietnam, Sapere, Milan, 1969, 320 pp. and map
- Italy: a human geography, Ferro, Milan, 1970, 484 pp.
- Notes on the port of Sao Luis do Maranhao, Cesviet, Milan, 1973, 124 pp.
- Jordan. A geographical presentation, Cesviet, Milan, 1979, 120 pp.
- The Valle Camonica motorway (in the appendix: sketch of Valle Camonica), Cesviet, Milan, 1979, 166 pp. and app.
- Some things about geography, Cesviet, Milan, 1988, 354 pp.

=== Volumes of geographical interest translated ===
- Phoumi Vongvichit, Archive for Laos, Cesviet, Rome, 1970, 79 pp. and map
- P. George & Others, Dictionary of Geography – Part 1: Human Geography, Cesviet, Rome, 1971, 255 pp.
- Ju.G. Sauskin, Introduction to Human Geography, Cesviet, Rome, 1972, 536 pp. (from Russian)
- DI Valentej (edited by), Introduction to population science, Cesviet, Rome, 1972, 433 pp. (from Russian)
- Institute of Geography of the USSR Academy of Sciences, Man, Society and the Environment, Cesviet, Milan, 1977, 398 pp. (from Russian)
- AM Rjabcikov, The geosphere. Structures, dynamics, natural development and modifications made by man, Cesviet, Milan, 1979, 230 pp. (from Russian

=== Publications in newspapers and scientific publications ===
- Corriere della sera (Page of Science) (1964–1965)
- Knowing (1964–1966)
- Geography in schools (1968–1971)
- Third World (1973–1974)
