= Remo Vigni =

Italian footballer (1938–2019)

Personal information
- Date of birth: 11 November 1938
- Place of birth: Brescia, Italy
- Date of death: 17 June 2019 (aged 80)
- Place of death: Villanuova sul Clisi, Italy
- Position: Striker

Senior career*
Years	Team	Apps	(Gls)
1957–1961	Brescia		
1961–1962	Sampdoria		
1962–1963	Catania		
1963	Sampdoria		
1963–1966	Monza		
1966–1969	Padova		
- * Club domestic league appearances and goals

Remo Vigni (11 November 1938 – 17 June 2019) was an Italian footballer who played as a striker.

He played for Brescia, Sampdoria, Catania, Monza and Padova.
