= Antonio Michele Stanca =

Italian geneticist (1942–2020)

- Born: 22 May 1942; Soleto, Apulia, Italy
- Died: 19 March 2020 (aged 77); Fidenza, Emilia-Romagna, Italy
- Education: University of Bari
- Scientific career
- Fields: genetics - plants
- Workplaces: University of Milan; Università Cattolica del Sacro Cuore; Institut national agronomique de Tunisie; University of Modena and Reggio Emilia

Antonio Michele Stanca (22 May 1942 – 19 March 2020) was an Italian geneticist.

He was born in Soleto, Italy. He graduated in University of Bari, majoring in agricultural science. He had been a professor at the University of Milan, Università Cattolica del Sacro Cuore of Piacenza, Institut national agronomique de Tunisie (INAT) of Tunis, and the University of Modena and Reggio Emilia.

During the COVID-19 pandemic, he died of COVID-19 on 19 March 2020 in Fidenza, aged 77.
