= 2015 in Italy =

- Decades: 1990s; 2000s; 2010s; 2020s; 2030s
- See also: History of Italy; Timeline of Italian history; List of years in Italy

The following lists events have happened in 2015 in the Italian Republic.

== Incumbents ==
- President: Giorgio Napolitano (until 14 January), Sergio Mattarella (starting 3 February)
- Prime Minister: Matteo Renzi

== Events ==
=== January ===
- January 14 – President of Italy Giorgio Napolitano announces his resignation.

=== March ===
- March 3 – South of Sicily, Italy's Coast Guard saves 941 trafficked migrants aboard five motorized dinghies and two larger vessels near southern Italian ports. Ten people are unaccounted for.

=== April ===
- April 9 – A man shot and killed three people and wounded two others at a Milan courthouse.
- April 18 – shipwreck in the Sicilian channel of a boat loaded with 887 migrants off the Libyan coast, accidentally impacted with the King Jacob ship. Over 800 deaths, the highest number of victims ever recorded.

=== May ===
- May 1 – October 31 – Expo 2015 is held in Milan, Italy.
- May 15 – A man fired from the balcony of his home in Secondigliano, Calabria, killing five people (including two relatives and a police officer) and wounding five others before being arrested.

=== July ===
- July 11 – Bombing of the Italian Consulate in Cairo.

=== October ===
- October 7 – Murder of Giordana Di Stefano.

=== December ===
- December – Lombardy Bans the Burka.

== Deaths ==
- January 4 – Pino Daniele, 59, singer
- January 10 – Francesco Rosi, 92, director
- February 14 – Michele Ferrero, 89, entrepreneur and owner of the chocolate manufacturer Ferrero SpA
- April 5 – Francesco Smalto, 87, fashion designer
- April 6 – Giovanni Berlinguer, 90, politician, MEP (2004–09)
- April 14 – Roberto Tucci, 93, Roman Catholic prelate, President of Vatican Radio (1985–2001), Cardinal-Priest of S. Ignazio di Loyola a Campo Marzio since 2001
- April 17 – Renato Altissimo, 74, politician
- April 19 – Elio Toaff, 99, rabbi, Chief Rabbi of Rome (1951–2002)
- May 15 – Renzo Zorzi, 68, racing driver
- May 21 – Annarita Sidoti, 44, race walker, 1997 World Champion
- June 12 – Micol Fontana, 101, fashion designer
- July 14 – Willer Bordon, 66, politician
- July 20 – Elio Fiorucci, 80, fashion designer
- August 29 – Antonio Ceccarini, 65, footballer
- September 17 – Valeria Cappellotto, 45, racing cyclist.
- September 27 – Pietro Ingrao, 100, politician, President of the Chamber of Deputies (1976–79)
- November 15 – Moira Orfei, 82, actress and owner of Circus Orfei
- November 16 – Nando Gazzolo, 87, actor and voice actor
- November 27 – Luca De Filippo, 67, director, son of Eduardo
- December 6 – Mariuccia Mandelli, 90, fashion designer, founder of Krizia fashion house
- December 14 – Armando Cossutta, 89, politician
- December 15 – Licio Gelli, 96, financer and Venerable Master of the clandestine lodge Propaganda Due (P2)

== See also ==
- 2015 in Italian television
- List of Italian films of 2015
