= 2017 in Italy =

- Decades: 1990s; 2000s; 2010s; 2020s; 2030s
- See also: History of Italy; Timeline of Italian history; List of years in Italy

Events during the year 2017 in Italy.

== Incumbents ==
- President: Sergio Mattarella
- Prime Minister: Paolo Gentiloni

== Events ==
- 18 January
  - January 2017 Central Italy earthquakes; 34 people are killed.
  - Rigopiano avalanche; 29 people are killed when the Hotel Rigopiano is demolished by an avalanche, following a series of earthquakes in the Abruzzo region.
- 21 January – A bus carrying Hungarian students crashes near Verona with 16 people dead.
- 11 February – Francesco Gabbani won Sanremo Music Festival 2017 by his YouTube sensational song Occidentali's Karma and went on to represent Italy in the Eurovision Song Contest 2017.
- 26–27 May – The 43rd G7 summit was held in Taormina
- 3 June – 2017 Turin stampede
- 21 August – 2017 Ischia earthquake; two people were killed, and 42 others were injured.
- 13 November – Italy failed to qualify for the 2018 FIFA World Cup after a 0–1 aggregate loss to Sweden in the two-leg play-off, missing World Cup for the first time since 1958. The head coach Gian Piero Ventura was subsequently sacked.

== Deaths ==
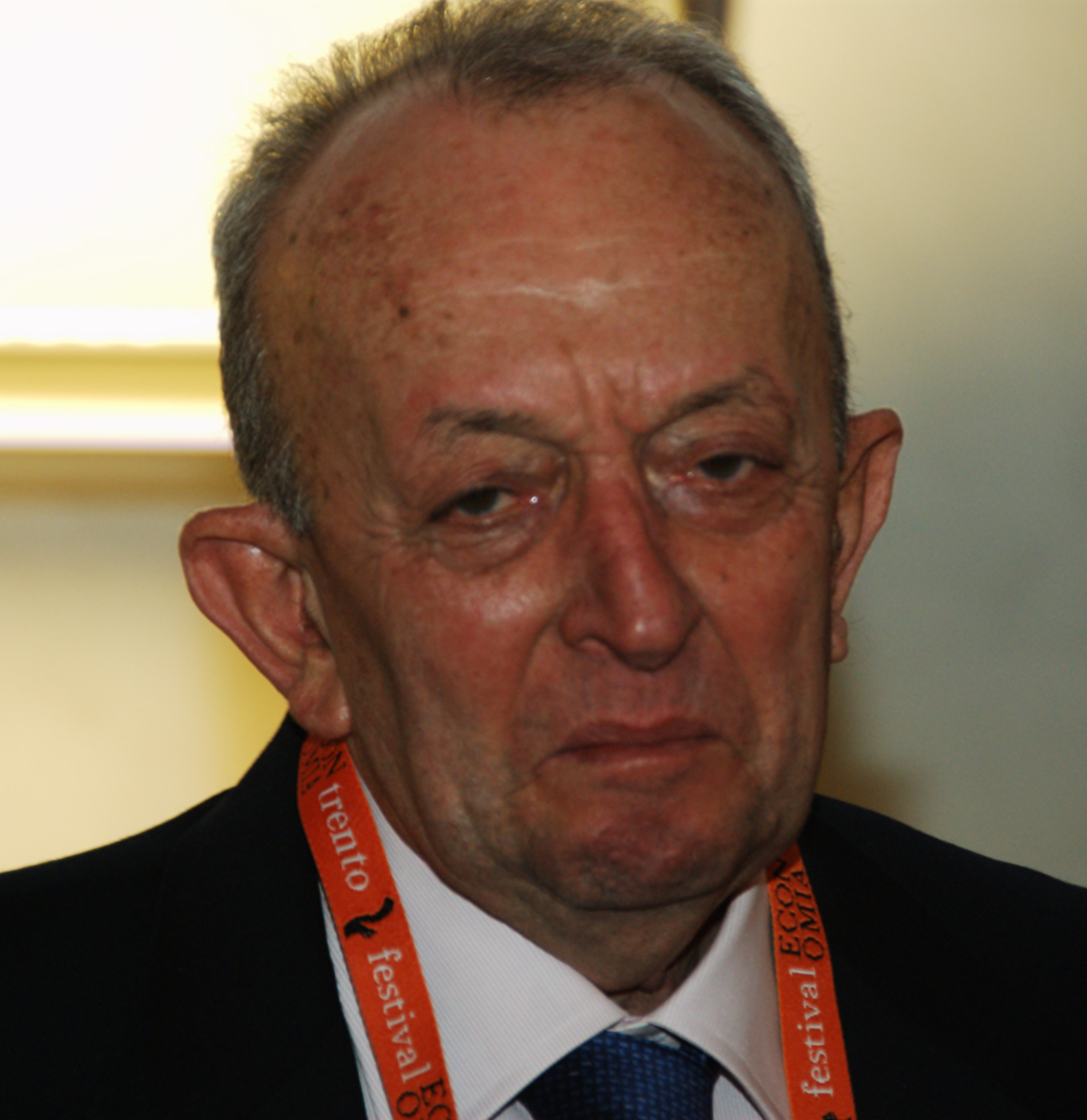
Tullio De Mauro

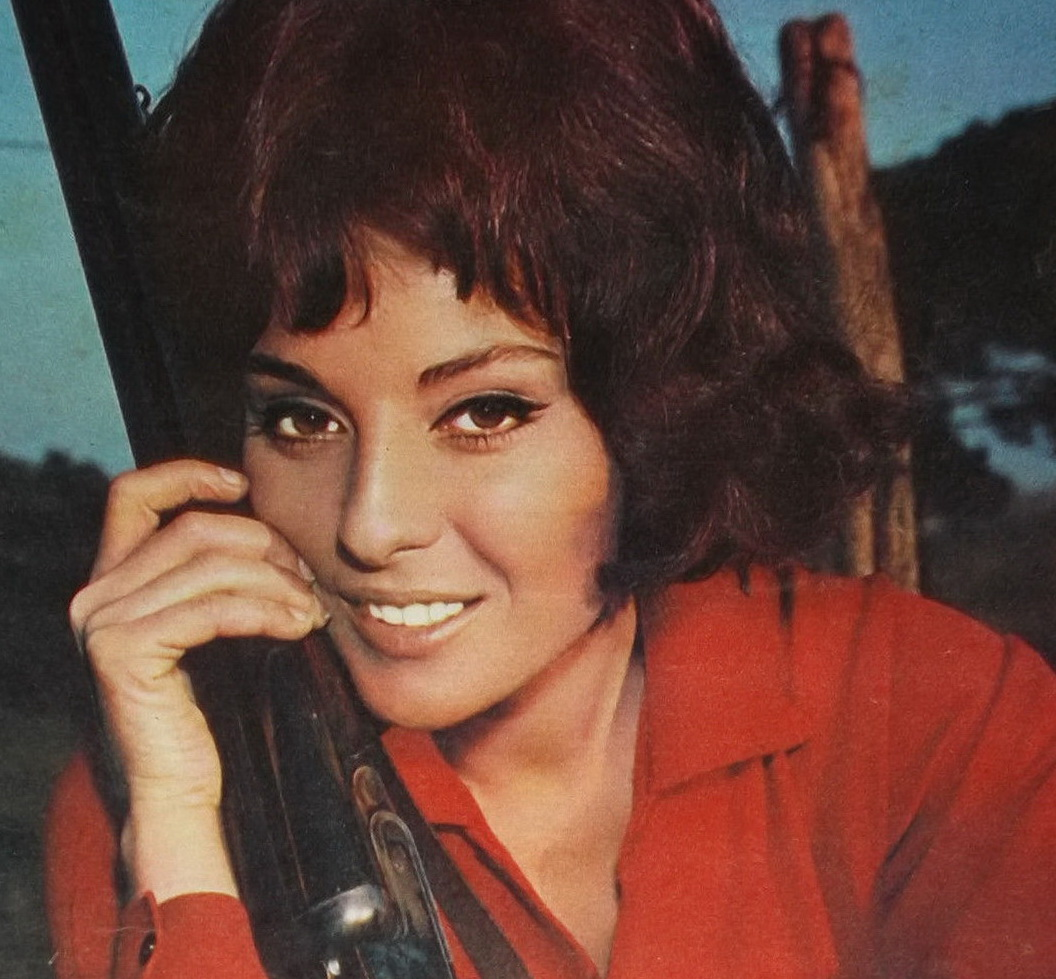
José Greci

- 5 January
  - Tullio De Mauro, 84, linguist.
  - Leonardo Benevolo, 93, architect and city planner.
- 7 January – Lelio Lagorio, 91, politician
- 12 January – Giulio Angioni, Italian writer and anthropologist (b. 1939)
- 28 January – Salvatore Tatarella, 69, politician
- 8 March – Danilo Mainardi, 83, ethologist
- 23 March – Cino Tortorella, 89, television presenter
- 15 April – Emma Morano, 117, supercentenarian, world's oldest living person, oldest Italian person ever and last living person born in the 1800s
- 16 April – Gianni Boncompagni, 84, radio and television presenter
- 11 May – Clelio Darida, 90, politician
- 24 May – Giovanni Bignami, 73, physicist
- 26 May – Laura Biagiotti, 73, fashion designer
- 1 June – José Greci, 76, actress
- 10 June – Oscar Mammì, 90, politician and former minister
- 23 June – Stefano Rodotà, 84, jurist and politician
- 17 June – Paolo Limiti, 77, television presenter
- 3 July – Paolo Villaggio, 84, actor
- 3 August – Giovanni Benedetti, 100, Catholic prelate, bishop of Foligno
- 5 August – Dionigi Tettamanzi, 83, cardinal and archbishop of Milan
- 1 September – Armando Aste, 91, alpinist
- 4 September – Gastone Moschin, actor (b. 1929)
- 9 September – Velasio de Paolis, 81, Italian Roman Catholic cardinal, President of the Prefecture for the Economic Affairs of the Holy See 2008–2011
- 27 September – Antonio Spallino, 92, fencer and politician, Olympic champion (1956) and Mayor of Como 1970–1985
- 1 October – Pierluigi Cappello, 50, poet, Viareggio Prize laureate 2010
- 3 October – Francesco Martino, politician, President of Region of Sicily 1993–1995 (born 1937)
- 5 October – Giorgio Pressburger, 80, Hungarian-born Italian writer
- 6 October – Roberto Anzolin, 79, footballer
- 8 October – Aldo Biscardi, 86, television presenter
- 21 October – Emilio D'Amore, 102, politician, Deputy 1948–1958, 1963–1968
- 17 November – Salvatore Riina, 87, criminal and chief of the Sicilian Mafia
- 26 December – Gualtiero Marchesi, 87, chef
- 27 December – Osvaldo Fattori, footballer, 95
