= 2018 in Italy =

- Decades: 1990s; 2000s; 2010s; 2020s; 2030s
- See also: History of Italy; Timeline of Italian history; List of years in Italy

Events during the year 2018 in Italy.

== Incumbents ==
- President: Sergio Mattarella
- Prime Minister: Paolo Gentiloni (until 1 June), Giuseppe Conte (starting 1 June)

== Events ==
- January 15 – Attilio Fontana stated during the 2018 Lombard regional election that the white race and the Western culture were in danger due to the migration flows from Africa. This created lot of protests and criticisms from the centre-left Democratic Party and also the anti-establishment Five Star Movement.
- January 30 – 18-year-old Italian woman Pamela Mastropietro is murdered soon after in Macerata, having been stabbed to death. her body is found severely mutilated, hidden in two suitcases, with the case prompting significant public outrage. Three Nigerian immigrants are later arrested in connection to the case.
- February 3 – in Macerata a 28 year old Italian shot and injured six African immigrants in a drive-by shooting incident that was described as an act of revenge motivated by the murder of Pamela Mastropietro. After the attack, Traini reportedly had an Italian flag draped on his shoulders and raised his arm in the fascist salute.
- March 3 –General elections are held. The centre-right coalition, led by Matteo Salvini's right-wing League, emerged with a plurality of seats in the Chamber of Deputies and in the Senate, while the anti-establishment Five Star Movement led by Luigi Di Maio became the party with the largest number of votes. The centre-left coalition, led by former Prime Minister Matteo Renzi, came third. However, no political group or party won an outright majority, resulting in a hung parliament.
- June 1 –The Government of Change is formed with Five Star Movement and the League. The coalition formed the Conte Cabinet under the leadership of Prime Minister Giuseppe Conte
- June 10 – Minister of the Interior Matteo Salvini announced the closure of Italian ports, stating that "Everyone in Europe is doing their own business, now Italy is also raising its head. Let's stop the business of illegal immigration." The vessel Aquarius, which is operated jointly by Médecins Sans Frontières and SOS Méditerranée and carried more than 600 migrants.
- June 18 – Minister of the Interior Matteo Salvini announced the government would conduct a census of Romani people in Italy for the purpose of deporting all who are not in the country legally. However this measure was criticized as unconstitutional and was opposed by all the oppositions and also by some members of the M5S.
- August 4 – Minister for Family and Disability Lorenzo Fontana called for the repel of the Mancino Law, an anti-fascist law saying the law was being used by “globalists” to promote “anti-Italian racism,” and should be abolished.
- August 14 – Morandi Bridge collapses in Genoa, 43 people killed.
- October 29 – The Lombardy League government blocks a Muslim association from turning a former hospital chapel into a mosque.

== Predicted and scheduled events ==
=== February ===
- February 6 to 10 - Sanremo Music Festival 2018, the 68th annual edition of the Sanremo Music Festival

=== March ===
- March 4 - Italian general election
- March 19 to 25 - 2018 World Figure Skating Championships at the Mediolanum Forum in Milan, Lombardy

=== May ===
- May 4 to 27 - 2018 Giro d'Italia

=== August ===
- August 6 - A fuel tanker exploded on the A14 motorway after colliding with a lorry near Bologna Airport in Italy, causing a section of the motorway to collapse. A person dies and 145 others are injured, at least 14 seriously.

=== September ===
- September 10 to 30 - 2018 FIVB Volleyball Men's World Championship, co-hosted by Bulgaria and Italy, with semifinals and finals in Turin

== Unspecified date ==
- Launch of PRISMA, a hyperspectral Earth observation satellite

== Deaths ==
- January 2 – Ferdinando Imposimato, 81, judge
- January 5 – Marina Ripa di Meana, 76, actress and television personality
- January 9 – Mario Perniola, 76, philosopher
- January 18 – Carla Marangoni, 102, gymnast
- January 19 – Anna Campori, 100, actress
- January 30 – Azeglio Vicini, 84, footballer and football coach
- February 15 – Bibi Ballandi, 71, television producer
- March 2
  - Gillo Dorfles, 107, art critic and painter
  - Carlo Ripa di Meana, 88, politician
- March 4 – Davide Astori, 31, footballer
- March 11 – Mario Vegetti, 81, historian of philosophy
- March 26 – Fabrizio Frizzi, 60, television presenter
- March 31 – Luigi De Filippo, 87, actor and playwright
- April 3 – Arrigo Petacco, 88, historian and journalist
- April 15 – Vittorio Taviani, 88, director
- May 5 – Ermanno Olmi, 86, director
- May 6 – Paolo Ferrari, 89, actor
- June 19 – Sergio Gonella, 85, football referee
- July 8 – Carlo Vanzina, 67, director
- July 25 – Sergio Marchionne, 66, businessman
- August 15 – Rita Borsellino, 73, anti-Mafia activist and politician
- August 17 – Claudio Lolli, 68, songwriter and singer
