= 2020 in Italy =

- Decades: 2000s; 2010s; 2020s; 2030s
- See also: History of Italy; Timeline of Italian history; List of years in Italy

The following is a list of events from the year 2020 in Italy.

== Incumbents ==
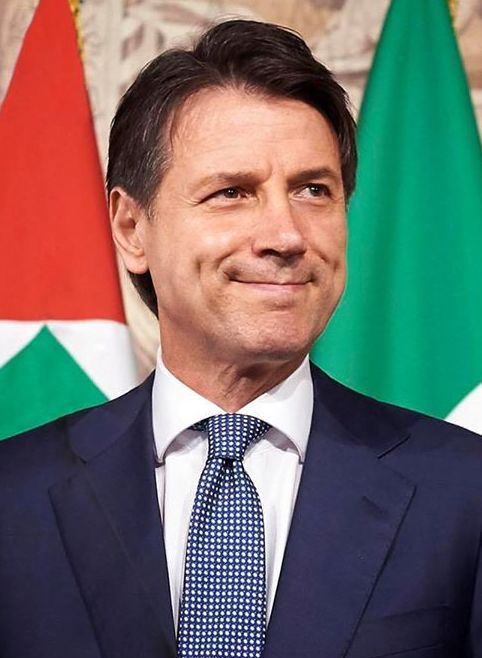
Giuseppe Conte

- President: Sergio Mattarella
- Prime Minister: Giuseppe Conte

== Events ==
=== January ===
- 28 December 2019 – 5 January 2020 – 2019–20 Tour de Ski
- 26 January
  - The 2020 Calabrian regional election takes place.
  - The 2020 Emilia-Romagna regional election takes place.
- 31 January – The first cases of coronavirus in Italy are confirmed.

=== February ===
- 12 February – Italy's Senate votes to allow prosecutors to put Matteo Salvini on trial over charges of holding migrants at sea.
- 21 February – The first outbreak of the COVID-19 pandemic in Italy occurs in Codogno in Lombardy, with 14 confirmed cases.
- 22 February – Some football games in the North are postponed due to the COVID-19 pandemic. They are played the following week.

=== March ===
- 4 March – Prime Minister Giuseppe Conte signs a decree to close all schools nationwide and activate a massive lockdown in northern Italy.
- 8 March – Conte signs a decree that imposes a national lockdown where all work and teaching activities are suspended until May 4 throughout the country.
- 9 March – After the Sassuolo v Brescia match, all sporting activities of every series and every sport are suspended due to the lockdown.

=== May ===
- 2 May – The Italian basketball championship is officially ended due to the COVID-19 pandemic in Italy; Virtus Bologna becomes champion of Italy at the table.
- 6 May – The member of the Chamber of Deputies Rosalba De Giorgi resigns from the Five Star Movement.
- 19 May – The expected date of the lifting of the school lockdown. However, the government postpones the opening to the new school year in September.

=== June ===
- 20 June – The Italian football championship Serie A resumes after the 2-month break due to the lockdown.

=== August ===
- 2 August – Juventus wins the 2019-20 Serie A.

=== September ===
- 17 September – After ending support in the United States, Canada, the rest of Europe and China, the Nintendo 3DS together with the 2DS, 3DS XL, New 3DS, New 3DS XL and New 2DS XL versions end support in Italy, thus putting an end to the era of 3DS in the Italian videogame market.
- 20 September – The 2020 Campania regional election takes place; Vincenzo De Luca is elected as president of the Campania region.

=== October ===
- 26 October – A violent protest takes place in Naples in which Camorra and far-right groups take part, against the closures brought by the government of the Campania region.

== Deaths ==
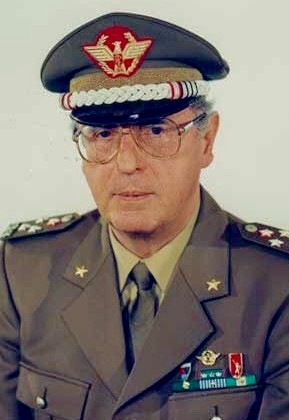
Domenico Corcione

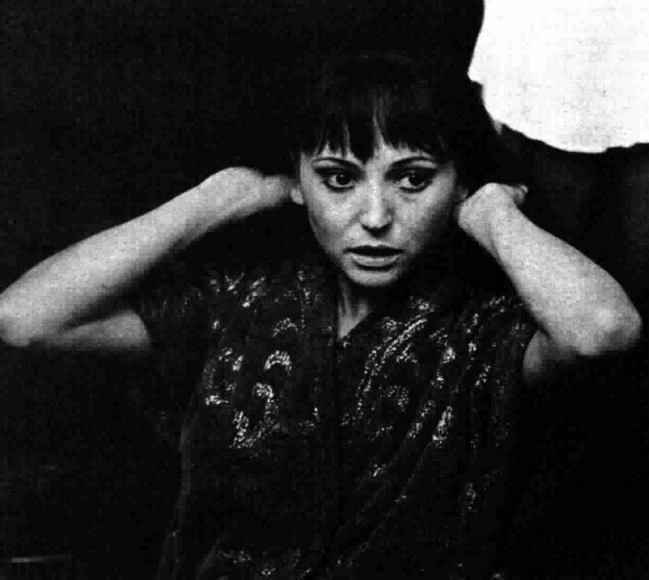
Claudia Giannotti

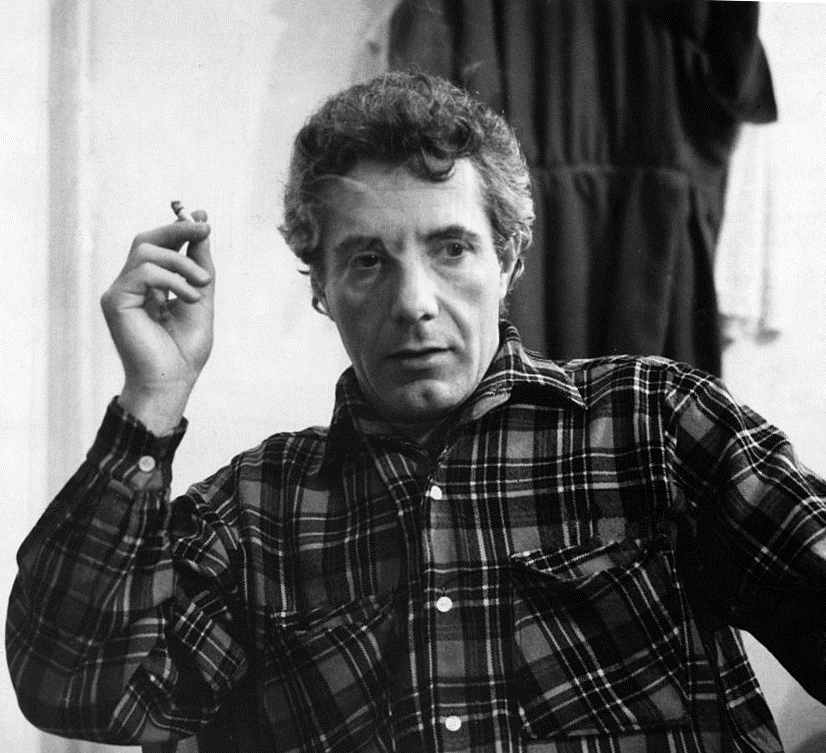
Gianrico Tedeschi

=== January ===
- 3 January – Domenico Corcione, general, Minister of Defence (b. 1929)
- 4 January
  - Emilio Giletti, racing driver (b. 1929)
  - Lorenza Mazzetti, film director (b. 1927)
- 7 January – Vincenzo Cerundolo, medical researcher (b. 1959)
- 10 January – Guido Messina, racing cyclist (b. 1931)

=== February ===
- 1 February
  - Luciano Gaucci, football executive (b. 1938)
  - Luciano Ricceri, production designer (b. 1940)
- 9 February – Mirella Freni, operatic soprano (b. 1935)

=== March ===
- 3 March – Mother Tekla Famiglietti, nun (b. 1936)
- 5 March – Antonio Nardini, historian and author (b. 1922)
- 9 March – Italo De Zan, cyclist (b. 1925)
- 10 March – Alessandro Criscuolo, jurist (b. 1937)
- 11 March – Stefano Bianco, Italian motorcycle racer (b. 1985)
- 12 March – Giovanni Battista Rabino, politician (b. 1931)
- 14 March – Piero Schlesinger, jurist and banker (b. 1930)
- 15 March – Vittorio Gregotti, architect (b. 1927)
- 16 March
  - Sergio Bassi, singer-songwriter (b. 1951)
  - Francesco Saverio Pavone, magistrate (b. 1944)
- 18 March – Luciano Federici, footballer (b. 1938)
- 19 March
  - Innocenzo Donina, footballer (b. 1950)
  - Antonio Michele Stanca, geneticist (b. 1942)
- 20 March – Marino Quaresimin, politician (b. 1937)
- 24 March – Lorenzo Acquarone, lawyer and politician (b. 1931)

=== April ===
- 17 April – Giuseppe Guarino, scholar and politician (born 1922)
- 26 April – Giulietto Chiesa, journalist and politician (b. 1940)

=== May ===
- 15 May – Ezio Bosso, composer, classical musician and conductor (b. 1971)

=== June ===
- 4 June – Marcello Abbado, composer and pianist (b. 1926)

=== July ===
- 26 July – Claudia Giannotti, actress (b. 1937)
- 27 July – Gianrico Tedeschi, actor (b. 1920)

=== August ===
- August 9 – Anna Maria Bottini, actress (b. 1916)

=== November ===
- 2 November – Gigi Proietti, actor, comedian (b. 1940)
- 11 November – Giuliana Minuzzo, alpine skier (b. 1931)

== See also ==
=== Country overviews ===
- Italy
- History of Italy
- History of modern Italy
- Outline of Italy
- Government of Italy
- Politics of Italy
- Years in Italy
- Timeline of Italy history

=== Related timelines for current period ===
- 2020
- 2020 in politics and government
- 2020s
