= 2025 in Italy =

- Decades: 2000s; 2010s; 2020s; 2030s
- See also: History of Italy; Timeline of Italian history; List of years in Italy

The following is a list of events from the year 2025 in Italy.

== Incumbents ==
- President – Sergio Mattarella
- President of the Senate of the Republic – Ignazio La Russa
- President of the Chamber of Deputies – Lorenzo Fontana
- Prime Minister – Giorgia Meloni
- President of the Constitutional Court – Giovanni Amoroso

== Events ==
=== January ===
- 8 January – The Iranian government releases journalist Cecilia Sala from prison, with Sala arriving back in Rome later that day.
- 12 January – Three skiers are killed in an avalanche at the Punta Valgrande in Piedmont.
- 13–23 January – The 2025 Winter World University Games in Turin
- 19 January – Ossama Anjiem aka Ossama al-Masri, a Libyan warlord wanted by the International Criminal Court for war crimes during the Libyan Civil War, is arrested in Turin under the ICC warrant but is released and deported to Libya after a court declines to approve his arrest.
- 30 January – The European Court of Human Rights rules that the Italian government had violated the right to life of residents living near the Terra dei Fuochi area between Naples and Caserta due to neglect of the site, which was contaminated by the disposal of toxic waste by the Camorra since 1988.

=== February ===
- 5 February – A helicopter crashes in Castelguelfo (it) near Parma, killing three people including Lorenzo Rovagnati, the CEO of the salami and prosciutto maker Rovagnati (it).
- 11 February – Tuscany becomes the first region of Italy to legalize assisted suicide.
- 15 February – One person dies and one is seriously injured after a mass shooting at Piazzale Gambara in Milan.
- 23 February – An American Airlines passenger aircraft flying from New York to New Delhi is diverted to Rome Fiumicino Airport following a bomb alert that turns out negative.
- 26 February – The Naval Air Station Sigonella is placed on lockdown following a car bomb alert that turns out negative.

=== March ===
- 8–17 March – 2025 Special Olympics World Winter Games
- 11 March – The investigation into the 2007 murder of Chiara Poggi is reopened.
- 13 March – A magnitude 4.4 earthquake hits Naples, injuring 11 people.
- 17 March – A boat carrying migrants sinks near Lampedusa, killing at least six people and leaving 40 others missing.
- 21 March
  - The Constitutional Court of Italy overturns a 1983 law that restricted international adoptions to married couples.
  - The Ministry of Education, University and Research orders a ban on the usage of gender-neutral symbols in schools, citing violations of Italian language grammar.
- 28 March – The Meloni government enacts an decree, which significantly restricts Italian citizenship by descent, affecting millions of Italian descendants.
- 31 March – Sixteen Tesla electric vehicles are destroyed in a suspected arson attack on a car dealership in Rome.

=== April ===
- 8 April – The Italian Competition Authority imposes fines of up to 20 million euros ($22 million) on six ticketing agencies for unfair business practices regarding admission into the Colosseum.
- 17 April – A cable car carrying tourists crashes after its cable snaps at Monte Faito in Castellammare di Stabia, killing four people.
- 18 April – Three people are reported killed following flooding caused by heavy rainstorms in Piedmont and Veneto.
- 26 April – Funeral of Pope Francis at the Basilica of Santa Maria Maggiore in Rome.
- 27 April – Three people are killed and two injured in a mass shooting following a fight outside a pizzeria in Monreale, in the province of Palermo.

=== May ===
- 9 May – A diver dies during preliminary salvage operations for the sunken superyacht Bayesian off the coast of Porticello, Sicily.
- 17 May – Italy's Lucio Corsi finishes in fifth place at Eurovision 2025 in Switzerland with the single "Volevo essere un duro".
- 22 May – The Constitutional Court of Italy rules against limiting the recognition of parentage of children born to same sex-parents to only the biological mother.
- 23 May – Napoli wins the 2024–25 Serie A after defeating Cagliari 2-0.
- 25–26 May – 2025 Italian local elections (first round)

=== June ===
- 8–9 June –
  - 2025 Italian referendum: Proposals on reforming regulations on labour and citizenship are voided due to 30% turnout.
  - 2025 Italian local elections (second round)
- 12 June – The European Court of Human Rights absolves Italy of liability over the response to the 2017 sinking of a migrant trafficking vessel in the Mediterranean Sea and the subsequent abuses by Libyan authorities on survivors held in Tripoli.
- 17 June – Sixteen ultras from Inter Milan and AC Milan are convicted and sentenced to up to 10 years' imprisonment for multiple criminal charges including murder and conspiracy.
- 18–29 June – EuroBasket Women 2025 in Czech Republic, Germany, Greece and Italy.
- 20 June – The wreckage of the yacht Bayesian, which sunk off the coast of Porticello, Sicily in 2024 killing seven people, is raised.
- 28 June – A radar failure at the Milan Control Center in Linate Airport blocks air traffic over northern Italy for hours, causing the cancellation of over 300 flights.

=== July ===
- 2 July – 2025 European heatwaves: Two people die from heat-related causes in Sardinia.
- 3 July – Nicola Borrelli resigns as head of the film department of the Ministry of Culture amid criticism over the agency providing nearly $1 million in tax credits for an American film director wanted for a double homicide in Rome.
- 4 July –
  - At least 45 people are injured and one is killed in an explosion at a petrol station in Prenestino-Centocelle, Rome.
  - Bruno, a sniffer dog who had been recognized by Prime Minister Giorgia Meloni for his service to law enforcement, is killed in his kennel in Taranto after having been deliberately fed sausages filled with nails.
- 8 July – A man dies after being sucked into the engine of a departing Volotea aircraft on the runway of Milan Bergamo Airport.
- 11 July – Giuseppe Palermo, a suspected leader of the 'Ndrangheta, is arrested in Colombia following an Interpol red notice against him.
- 13 July – The Domus de Janas of Sardinia are designated as World Heritage Sites by UNESCO.
- 17 July – Austrian parachutist Felix Baumgartner dies in a paragliding accident in Porto Sant'Elpidio.
- 21 July – The Constitutional Court of Italy rules that the non-biological mother in a same-sex union is entitled to the country's mandatory 10-day paternity leave.
- 31 July – The Italian government signs an agreement with the Holy See to convert the 430-hectare rural site of Santa Maria di Galeria (it) north of Rome into a solar farm as part of efforts by the Vatican City to generate its energy needs and become a carbon-neutral state.

=== August ===
- 1 August – The Court of Justice of the European Union imposes restrictions on the Italian government's policy on fast-tracking deportations of migrants to "safe" countries by subjecting the latter designation to judicial review.
- 6 August – The government approves a 13.5 billion euro ($15.5 billion) project to build the Strait of Messina Bridge, connecting Sicily and Calabria.
- 13 August – Two boats carrying migrants sink off the coast of Lampedusa, killing at least 26 people and leaving at least 12 others missing.
- 15 August – A Palestinian woman suffering from malnutrition dies at a hospital in Pisa after being brought there from the Gaza Strip in a medical evacuation organized by the Italian government.
- 17 August – Pope Leo XIV holds a Mass and lunch with refugees, homeless, and poor people, and church volunteers at the St. Mary sanctuary in Albano Laziale, Province of Rome.
- 21 August – A Ukrainian national is arrested in Misano Adriatico, province of Rimini, on suspicion of co-masterminding the Nord Stream pipelines sabotage in 2022.

=== September ===
- 3 September – Two armed Turkish nationals are arrested on suspicion of plotting an attack on the feast of the Macchina di Santa Rosa in Viterbo.
- 7 September – Carlo Acutis of Milan and Pier Giorgio Frassati of Turin are canonized by Pope Leo XIV as saints of the Roman Catholic Church.
- 19 September – Three workers are killed in an explosion at a silo operated by waste management company Ecopartenope near Caserta.
- 22 September – A nationwide general strike is called by grassroots trade union USB to protest the genocide in Gaza and end the government's complicity, causing massive disruption to ports and public transport in major cities like Rome and Milan.
- 24 September – The Italian Navy deploys the frigate Virginio Fasan to assist the Global Sumud Flotilla on its way to the Gaza Strip after the convoy is targeted by explosions off the Greek coast.
- 28 September –
  - Italy wins the 21st FIVB Volleyball Men's World Championship in the Philippines after defeating Bulgaria in four sets (25-21, 25-17, 17-25, 25-10).
  - 2025 Valdostan regional election: The Valdostan Union retains its majority in the Regional Council of Aosta Valley.
- 28–29 September – 2025 Marche regional election: Francesco Acquaroli is re-elected President of Marche.

=== October ===
- 1 October –
  - The Carabinieri Art Squad seizes 21 paintings by Salvador Dalí suspected of being forgeries at an exhibition at the Palazzo Tarasconi in Parma.
  - A SIAI-Marchetti SF.260 of the Italian Air Force crashes in Circeo National Park near Sabaudia, killing the two crew members on board.
- 3 October – A nationwide general strike is held in solidarity with the Global Sumud Flotilla.
- 5–6 October – 2025 Calabrian regional election: Roberto Occhiuto is re-elected President of Calabria.
- 7 October – The European Parliament narrowly rejects to lift the immunity of Italian MEP Ilaria Salis with the majority of a single vote (306 to 305).
- 12–13 October – 2025 Tuscan regional election: Eugenio Giani is re-elected President of Tuscany.
- 14 October – Three Carabinieri officers carrying out an eviction order are killed while 15 others are injured following a deliberate gas explosion at a farmhouse near Verona.
- 15 October – The Supreme Court of Cassation rejects the extradition of a Ukrainian suspect in the 2022 Nord Stream pipelines sabotage to Germany and orders a reassessment.
- 16 October – A bomb attack is carried out on a car belonging to Rai 3 journalist Sigfrido Ranucci in front of his residence in Pomezia. No injuries are recorded.
- 19 October – Pope Leo XIV canonizes Italian religious Vincenza Maria Poloni, Maria Troncatti and Bartolo Longo at an open-air mass in Saint Peter's Square.
- 20 October – A driver is killed in a rock-throwing attack on a bus carrying Pistoia Basket 2000 players by supporters of rival club RSR Sebastiani Rieti (it) near Rieti following a match between the two teams.
- 29 October – The Court of Audit rejects the government's proposal to build the Strait of Messina Bridge.

=== November ===
- 1 November – Five German climbers are killed in an avalanche on the Vertainspitze in the Dolomites.
- 3 November – The medieval Torre dei Conti in Rome partially collapses, killing one person.
- 19 November – The Supreme Court of Cassation approves the extradition of a Ukrainian suspect in the 2022 Nord Stream pipelines sabotage to Germany after rejecting an appeal by the defendant. The extradition proceeds on 27 November.
- 23–24 November –
  - 2025 Apulian regional election: Antonio Decaro is elected President of Apulia.
  - 2025 Campania regional election: Roberto Fico is elected President of Campania.
  - 2025 Venetian regional election: Alberto Stefani is elected President of Veneto.
- 25 November – The Chamber of Deputies votes unanimously to recognize femicide as a crime punishable by life imprisonment.
- 28 November — A nationwide general strike is called by several trade unions, including, USB, CUB, COBAS, USI‑CIT, FLAI and FNSI against the government’s 2026 budget.

=== December ===
- 10 December – Italian cuisine is recognized as intangible cultural heritage by UNESCO.
- 12 December — A nationwide general strike is called by the Italian General Confederation of Labour against the government’s 2026 budget.
- 22 December — The Italian Competition Authority imposes a 98 million euro ($115 million) fine on Apple Inc. for violating privacy regulations for third-party developers.
- 23 December — The Italian Competition Authority imposes a 255 million euro ($300 million) fine on Ryanair for abusing its market position to hinder travel agencies from combining Ryanair flights with other services from 2023 to 2025.
- 27 December – Mohammad Hannoun, the president of the Palestinian Association in Italy, is arrested along with eight others on suspicion of raising funds for Hamas.

== Holidays ==
- 1 January – New Year's Day
- 6 January – Epiphany
- 20 April – Easter Sunday
- 21 April – Easter Monday
- 25 April – Liberation Day
- 1 May – International Workers' Day
- 2 June – Republic Day
- 15 August – Assumption Day
- 1 November – All Saints' Day
- 8 December – Immaculate Conception
- 25 December – Christmas Day
- 26 December – Saint Stephen's Day

== Art and entertainment ==
- List of 2025 box office number-one films in Italy
- List of Italian films of 2025
- Sanremo Music Festival 2025
- List of Italian submissions for the Academy Award for Best International Feature Film
- 2025 Rome Film Festival
- 82nd Venice International Film Festival

== Deaths ==
=== January ===
- 1 January
  - Nora Orlandi, 91, musician and film composer (The Strange Vice of Mrs. Wardh, Johnny Yuma, Clint the Stranger).
  - Rosita Missoni, 93, knitwear designer, co-founder of Missoni.
- 2 January
  - Aldo Agroppi, 80, footballer (Torino, national team) and manager (Fiorentina).
  - Italo de Lorenzo, 85, bobsledder.
  - Roger Mantovani, 58, radio presenter and actor.
- 4 January – Arigo Padovan, 97, road racing cyclist.
- 6 January – Aristide Gunnella, 93, politician, deputy (1968–1992) and minister for regional affairs (1987–1988).
- 13 January – Oliviero Toscani, 82, photographer

=== March ===
- 1 March – Fulco Pratesi, 90, environmentalist, journalist and politician.

=== April ===
- 5 April – Antonello Fassari, 72, actor.

=== June ===
- 22 June – Arnaldo Pomodoro, 98, sculptor.

=== July ===
- 1 July – Marco Onado, 84, economist.
- 11 July – Goffredo Fofi, 88, essayist and cinema critic.
- 31 July – Jesto, 40, rapper.

=== August ===
- 10 August – Paola Mauriello, 44, basketball player (national team).
- 12 August – Mattia Debertolis, 29, orienteering athlete.
- 17 August – Sergio Pollastrelli, 90, politician.
- 19 August – Salvo Vitale, 82, poet and writer.
- 23 August – Giuseppe Maggi, 95, archaeologist.
- 29 August – Giulia Barone, 78, historian, medievalist and paleographer.

=== September ===
- 4 September –
  - Giorgio Armani, 91, fashion designer (Armani)
  - Pia Velsi, 101, actress (Parenti serpenti, ...And the Wild Wild Women, L'uccello migratore)
- 8 September – Hugo Valentin, 87, politician and Ladin language advocate
- 15 September – Matteo Franzoso, 25, alpine skier
- 23 September – Claudia Cardinale, 87, actress (Once Upon a Time in the West, The Leopard, 8½)
- 25 September – Ada Becchi, 88, politician and economist.

=== October ===
- 7 October – Aldo Morelli, 75, politician, president of the Province of Pistoia (1990–1999).
- 8 October – Paolo Bonacelli, 88, actor (Salò, or the 120 Days of Sodom, Mission Impossible III, Midnight Express).
- 12 October – Cesare Paciotti, 67, shoe designer.
- 13 October – Dolly Van Doll, 87, trans vedette.
- 17 October – Gino Pivatelli, 92, football player (Bologna, national team) and manager (Ravenna).
- 18 October –
  - Martine Brochard, 81, French-Italian actress (Paprika, The Nun and the Devil, Eyeball).
  - Sofia Corradi, 91, pedagogist, inventor of the Erasmus Programme.
- 19 October – Mauro Farina, 68, singer, songwriter, and producer, founder of SAIFAM.
- 20 October – Edoardo Menichelli, 86, Roman Catholic cardinal, archbishop of Chieti-Vasto (1994–2004) and Ancona-Osimo (2004–2017).
- 23 October – Franco Reviglio, 90, politician, minister of finance (1979–1981, 1993) and senator (1992–1994).
- 24 October – Giuliano Besson, 75, Olympic alpine skier (1972).
- 25 October –
  - Mario De Grassi, 88, footballer (Triestina, Potenza, Casertana).
  - Mauro Di Francesco, 74, actor (Attila flagello di Dio, An Ideal Adventure, Chewingum) and comedian.
  - Franco Mari, 83, actor (All the Moron's Men, Italiano medio, Omicidio all'italiana) and comedian.
- 27 October – Mimmo Jodice, 91, photographer.
- 29 October – James Senese, 80, jazz saxophonist (Napoli Centrale), singer-songwriter, and actor (No Thanks, Coffee Makes Me Nervous, Zora the Vampire).
- 30 October – Enea Piccinelli, 98, politician, deputy (1963–1983).
- 31 October – Francesca Duranti, 90, writer.

=== November ===
- 2 November –
  - Giovanni Galeone, 84, football player (Udinese) and manager (Pescara, Napoli).
  - Guido Venturoni, 91, naval officer, chief of staff of the Navy (1992–1993) and the defence staff (1994–1999), and chair of the NATO Military Committee (1999–2002).
- 3 November – Giancarlo Pasquini, 88, politician, senator (1996–2006).
- 4 November –
  - Ada Feinberg-Sireni, 95, Italian-born Israeli politician, MK (1969–1974).
  - Giorgio Forattini, 94, political cartoonist (La Repubblica, La Stampa, Il Giornale).
  - Giuseppe Nocco, 86, politician, senator (2001–2006).
- 5 November –
  - Andrea de Adamich, 84, racing driver (Surtees, Brabham).
  - Annibale Marini, 84, member (1997–2006) and president (2005–2006) of the constitutional court.
- 6 November –
  - Anna Laura Braghetti, 72, political militant (Red Brigades).
  - Giulio Sanguineti, 93, Roman Catholic prelate, bishop of Brescia (1998–2007).
- 21 November – Ornella Vanoni, 91, singer.
- 25 November – Lorenzo Buffon, 95, footballer (AC Milan, Genoa, Inter Milan).

=== December ===
- 1 December – Nicola Pietrangeli, 92, Hall of Fame tennis player.
- 4 December – Paolo Nuvoli, 90, president of Molise (1985–1988).
- 12 December –
  - Amato Berardi, 67, Italian-American politician
  - Franco Vaccari, 89, artist and photographer.
- 15 December – Anna Rusticano, 71, singer.
- 26 December – Maria Sole Agnelli, 100, philanthropist and politician, mayor of Campello sul Clitunno (1960–1970).
