= 1942 in Italy =

- Decades: 1920s; 1930s; 1940s; 1950s; 1960s
- See also: History of Italy; Timeline of Italian history; List of years in Italy

Events from the year 1942 in Italy. This year was dominated by Italy's participation in the Second World War, where Italy strove to establish a new Roman Empire.

== Incumbents ==
- King of Italy – Victor Emmanuel III
- Prime Minister and Il Duce – Benito Mussolini

== Events ==
- 8 November – World War II – North African campaign – Operation Torch is launched; Allied forces invade French North Africa under axis-aligned Vichy France, threatening Italian Libya.

Literature and culture

== Births ==
- 5 January – Maurizio Pollini, pianist and conductor (d. 2024)
- 31 January – Daniela Bianchi, actress
- 28 February – Oliviero Toscani, photographer (d. 2025)
- 18 July – Giacinto Facchetti, footballer (d. 2006)
- 8 November – Sandro Mazzola, footballer (d. 2026)

== Deaths ==
- 9 August – Aldo Ovigilo, politician who served as Minister of Justice (b. 1873)

== See also ==
- Military history of Italy during World War II
