= Criticism of Hamas =

Aside from its use of political violence in pursuit of its goals, the Palestinian political and military organization Hamas has been widely criticised for a variety of reasons, including its use of hate speech by its representatives, use of human shields and child combatants as part of its military operations, restriction of political freedoms within the Gaza Strip, and human rights abuses.

== Allegations of antisemitism ==
The 1988 Hamas charter proclaims that jihad against Jews is required until Judgement Day. Article 7 of the 1988 governing charter of Hamas "openly dedicate(s) Hamas to genocide against the Jewish people". Authors have characterized the violent language against all Jews in the original Hamas charter as genocidal, incitement to genocide, or antisemitic. The charter attributes collective responsibility to Jews, not just Israelis, for various global issues, including both World Wars. The American Interest magazine wrote that the charter "echoes" Nazi propaganda in claiming that Jews profited during World War II. Jeffrey Goldberg, editor-in-chief of The Atlantic magazine and others have compared statements in the 1988 charter with those that appear in The Protocols of the Elders of Zion.

Esther Webman of the Project for the Study of Anti-Semitism at Tel Aviv University wrote in 1998 that Hamas leaflets during the First Intifada "contained the most extreme anti-Semitic statements" of all Palestinian factions, but argued that "anti-Semitism is not the main tenet of Hamas ideology." The tone and casting of the Israeli-Palestinian conflict as part of an eternal struggle between Muslim and Jews by the Hamas Covenant had become an obstacle for the movement to be able to take part in diplomatic forums involving Western nations.

In an op-ed in The Guardian in January 2006, Khaled Meshaal, the chief of Hamas's political bureau, denied antisemitism, on Hamas' part, and he said that the nature of Israeli–Palestinian conflict was not religious but political. He also said that Hamas has "no problem with Jews who have not attacked us".

In 2009 representatives of the small anti-Zionist Jewish group Neturei Karta met with Hamas leader Ismail Haniyeh in Gaza, who stated that he held nothing against Jews but only against the State of Israel.

Hamas' 2017 charter removed the antisemitic language of the original, stating that their struggle is against Zionism and not Jews, while rejecting persecution or denial of rights of any human being on nationalist, religious, or sectarian grounds. It also says that the Jewish question, antisemitism, and the persecution of Jews stem from European history rather than Arab or Muslim heritage, while advancing goals for a Palestinian state that many see as consistent with a two-state solution.

=== Statements by Hamas members ===
Ahmed Yassin, the founder of Hamas, responded to accusations that "Hamas hate Jews" by stating in a 1988 interview:

We don't hate Jews and fight Jews because they are Jewish. They are a people of faith and we are a people of faith, and we love all people of faith. If my brother, from my own mother and father and my own faith takes my home and expels me from it, I will fight him. I will fight my cousin if he takes my home and expels me from it. So when a Jew takes my home and expels me from it, I will fight him. I don't fight other countries because I want to be at peace with them, I love all people and wish peace for them, even the Jews. The Jews lived with us all of our lives and we never assaulted them, and they held high positions in government and ministries. But if they take my home and make me a refugee like 4 million Palestinians in exile? Who has more right to this land? The Russian immigrant who left this land 2000 years ago or the one who left 40 years ago? We don't hate the Jews, we only ask for them to give us our rights.

In 2008, Hamas imam Yousif al-Zahar said in his sermon at the Katib Wilayat mosque in Gaza that "Jews are a people who cannot be trusted. They have been traitors to all agreements. Go back to history. Their fate is their vanishing." Another Hamas legislator and imam, Sheik Yunus al-Astal, discussed a Quranic verse suggesting that "suffering by fire is the Jews' destiny in this world and the next." He concluded "Therefore we are sure that the Holocaust is still to come upon the Jews."

Following the rededication of the Hurva Synagogue in Jerusalem in March 2010, senior Hamas figure al-Zahar called on Palestinians everywhere to observe five minutes of silence "for Israel's disappearance and to identify with Jerusalem and the al-Aqsa mosque". He further stated that "Wherever you have been you've been sent to your destruction. You've killed and murdered your prophets and you have always dealt in loan-sharking and destruction. You've made a deal with the devil and with destruction itself—just like your synagogue."

In 2014 Hamas spokesman Osama Hamdan defended a video of his repeating the blood libel myth in an interview.

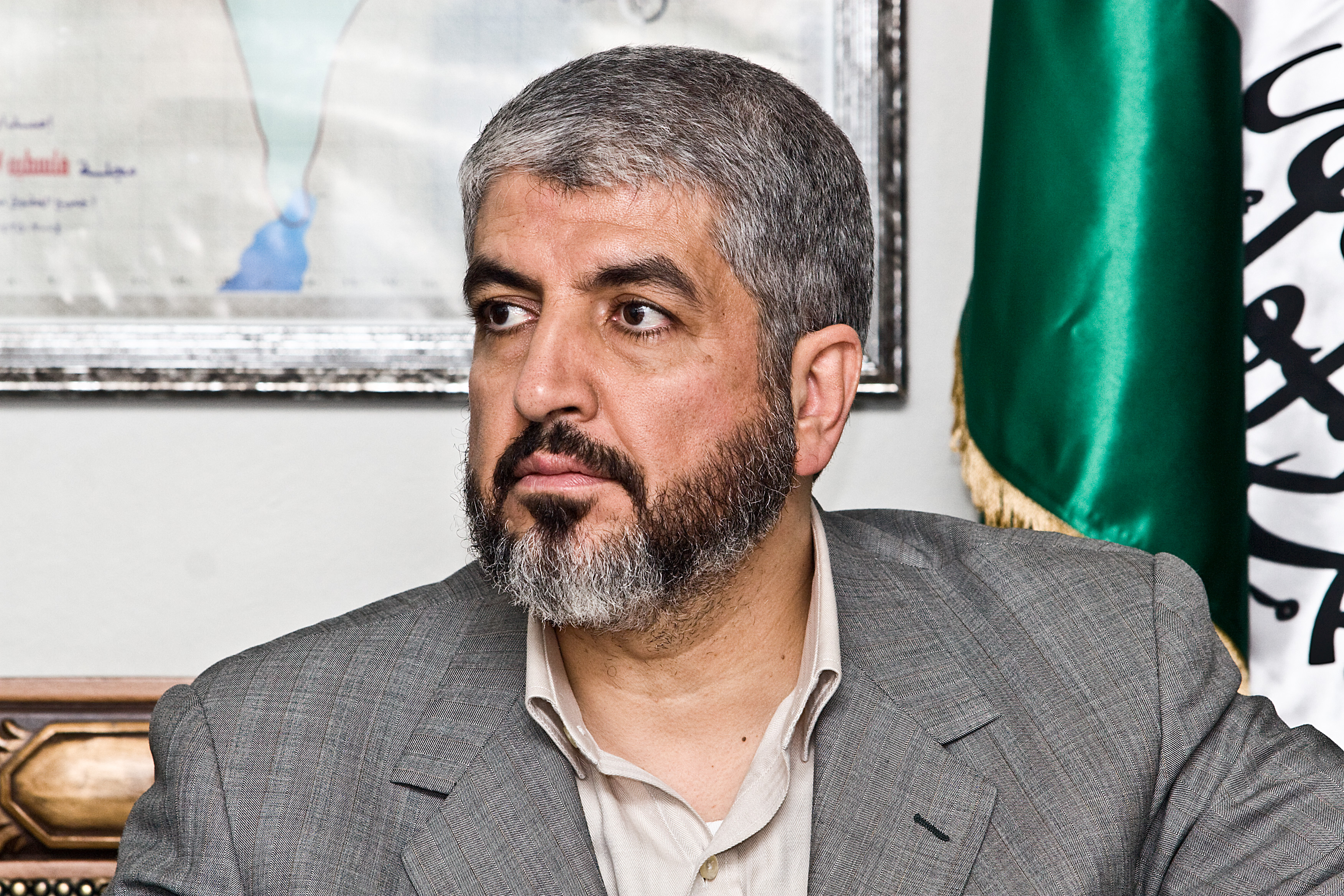
Longtime leader, Khaled Meshaal, in 2009.

In an interview with CBS This Morning on 27 July 2014, then Hamas leader Khaled Meshaal stated:

We are not fanatics. We are not fundamentalists. We are not actually fighting the Jews because they are Jews per se. We do not fight any other races. We fight the occupiers.

On 8 January 2012, during a visit to Tunis, Gazan Hamas prime minister Ismail Haniyeh told the Associated Press that he disagrees with the anti-Semitic slogans. "We are not against the Jews because they are Jews. Our problem is with those occupying the land of Palestine," he said. "There are Jews all over the world, but Hamas does not target them." In response to a statement by Palestinian Authority leader Mahmoud Abbas that Hamas preferred non-violent means and had agreed to adopt "peaceful resistance," Hamas contradicted Abbas. According to Hamas spokesman Sami Abu-Zuhri, "We had agreed to give popular resistance precedence in the West Bank, but this does not come at the expense of armed resistance."

In May 2009, senior Hamas MP Sayed Abu Musameh said, "in our culture, we respect every foreigner, especially Jews and Christians, but we are against Zionists, not as nationalists but as fascists and racists." In January 2009, Gazan Hamas Health Minister Basim Naim published a letter in The Guardian, stating that Hamas has no quarrel with Jewish people, only with the actions of Israel.

==== Statements on the Holocaust ====
Hamas has been accused of promoting Holocaust denial. It described Nazi Germany's genocide of European Jews as "so-called" and "an alleged and invented story with no basis" in a 2000 press release. In 2003, Hamas co-founder and deputy leader Abdel Aziz al-Rantisi claiming that "Zionists were behind the Nazis' murder of many Jews." In 2000, the Washington Institute for Near East Policy reported that Hamas officially denied the Holocaust for the first time in a press release responding to the Stockholm International Forum on the Holocaust, stating:

This conference bears a clear Zionist goal, aimed at forging history by hiding the truth about the so-called Holocaust, which is an alleged and invented story with no basis. (...) The invention of these grand illusions of an alleged crime that never occurred, ignoring the millions of dead European victims of Nazism during the war, clearly reveals the racist Zionist face, which believes in the superiority of the Jewish race over the rest of the nations. (...) By these methods, the Jews in the world flout scientific methods of research whenever that research contradicts their racist interests.

In August 2003, senior Hamas official Abd Al-Aziz Al-Rantisi wrote in the Hamas newspaper Al-Risala that the Zionists encouraged murder of Jews by the Nazis with the aim of forcing them to immigrate to Palestine.

In 2005, Khaled Mashal called Mahmoud Ahmadinejad's 14 December 2005, statements on the Holocaust that Europeans had "created a myth in the name of Holocaust") as "courageous". Later in 2008, Basim Naim, the minister of health in the Hamas-led Palestinian Authority government in Gaza countered holocaust denial, and said "it should be made clear that neither Hamas nor the Palestinian government in Gaza denies the Nazi Holocaust. The Holocaust was not only a crime against humanity but one of the most abhorrent crimes in modern history. We condemn it as we condemn every abuse of humanity and all forms of discrimination on the basis of religion, race, gender or nationality."

In 2008, Basem Naim, Minister of Health and Information in Gaza, stated that "it should be made clear that neither Hamas nor the Palestinian government in Gaza denies the Nazi Holocaust. The Holocaust was not only a crime against humanity but one of the most abhorrent crimes in modern history. We condemn it as we condemn every abuse of humanity and all forms of discrimination on the basis of religion, race, gender or nationality."

In 2009, it was involved in a dispute with the United Nations Relief and Works Agency (UNRWA) over the inclusion of Holocaust education in Gaza, with Hamas's Popular Committees for Refugees describing the Holocaust as "a lie invented by the Zionists". Hamas leader Yunis al-Astal stated that having the Holocaust included in the UNRWA curriculum for Gaza students amounted to "marketing a lie and spreading it", and "I do not exaggerate when I say this issue is a war crime, because of how it serves the Zionist colonizers and deals with their hypocrisy and lies."

In February 2011, Hamas again voiced opposition to UNRWA's teaching of the Holocaust in Gaza. According to Hamas, "Holocaust studies in refugee camps is a contemptible plot and serves the Zionist entity with a goal of creating a reality and telling stories in order to justify acts of slaughter against the Palestinian people." In July 2012, Fawzi Barhoum, a Hamas spokesman, denounced a visit by Ziad al-Bandak, an adviser to Palestinian Authority President Mahmoud Abbas, to the Auschwitz death camp, saying it was "unjustified" and "unhelpful" and only served the "Zionist occupation" while coming "at the expense of a real Palestinian tragedy". He also called the Holocaust an "alleged tragedy" and "exaggerated".

== Genocide allegations ==
Experts in international law and genocide studies have leveled the accusation of Hamas committing genocide against Israelis. Hamas is alleged to have carried out genocide during its surprise attack on Israel on 7 October 2023. The assault involved Hamas militants raiding communities in southern Israel, resulting in the killing, torturing, and mutilation of men, women, and children. The death toll, predominantly civilians, reached 1,200, while 240 individuals of various ages were reportedly kidnapped and taken to the Gaza Strip. Legal and genocide experts condemned the attack as a severe violation of international law, asserting that Hamas executed these acts with the intent to destroy the Israeli national group. Some commentators draw attention to Hamas' founding charter, which advocates for the destruction of Israel, contains antisemitic language, and, according to some researchers, implies a call for the genocide of Jews. This has led to suggestions that the attacks on 7 October were an endeavor to fulfill this agenda.

== US criticism ==
The FBI and United States Department of Justice in 2004 stated that Hamas threatened the United States through covert cells on US soil.

Researcher Steven Emerson in 2006 alleged that the group had "an extensive infrastructure in the US mostly revolving around the activities of fundraising, recruiting and training members, directing operations against Israel, organizing political support and operating through human-rights front groups". Emerson added that while the group had never acted outside of Israel or the Palestinian Territories, it does have the capacity to carry out attacks in the US "if it decided to enlarge the scope of its operations".

FBI director Robert Mueller in 2005 testified to the Senate Intelligence Committee that, the FBI's assessment at that time was that there was "a limited threat of a coordinated terrorist attack in the US from Palestinian terrorist organizations" such as Hamas. He added that Hamas had "maintained a longstanding policy of focusing their attacks on Israeli targets in Israel and the Palestinian territories", and that the FBI believed that the main interest of Hamas in the US remained "the raising of funds to support their regional goals", and that:

"of all the Palestinian groups, Hamas has the largest presence in the US, with a robust infrastructure, primarily focused on fundraising, propaganda for the Palestinian cause, and proselytizing."

Although it would be a major strategic shift for Hamas, its United States network is theoretically capable of facilitating acts of terrorism in the US.

In May 2011, Hamas leader and Prime Minister Ismail Haniyeh condemned the US killing of Osama bin Laden in Pakistan. Haniyeh praised Bin Laden, the founder of the jihadist organization al-Qaeda, as a "martyr" and an "Arab holy warrior". The US government condemned his remarks as "outrageous".

In 2018, Ambassador Nikki Haley of the U.S. Mission to the United Nations stated that: "The people who have suffered by far the most because of Hamas are the Palestinian people."

Following its actions in 2023, Hamas has been compared to ISIS due to its brutal methods and goals. US military analyst Andrew Exum has denounced such depictions as "misguided".

== Human shields ==
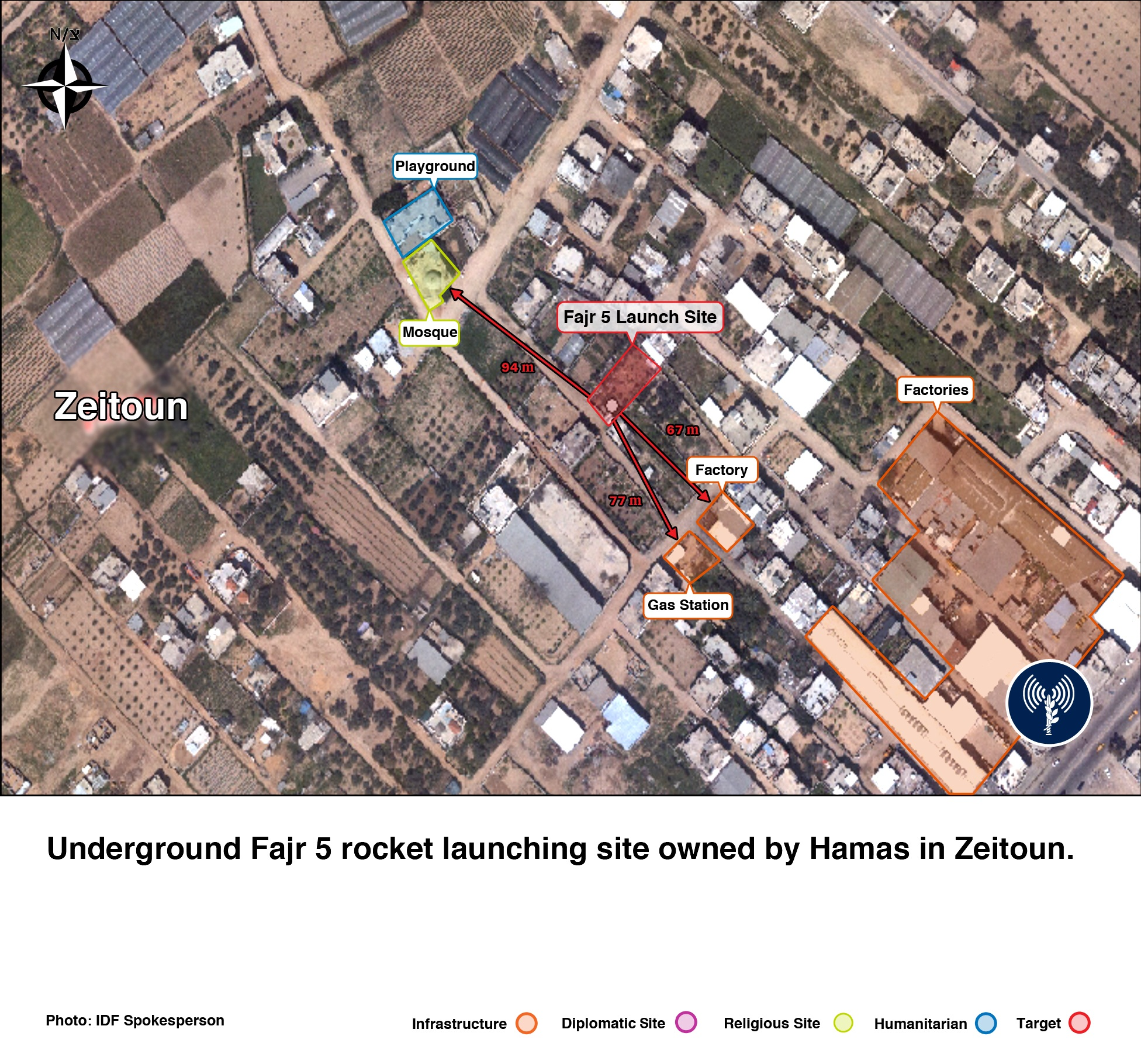
A Hamas rocket launch site and its civilian surroundings.

Human shields are non-combatants who either volunteer or are forced to shield a military target in order to deter the enemy from attacking it.

During Operation Cast Lead, the Israeli government repeatedly accused Hamas of using human shields. In their investigation, Amnesty International "found no evidence that Hamas or other fighters directed the movement of civilians to shield military objectives from attacks." However, Amnesty did find evidence that the IDF forced Palestinian civilians to serve as human shields. Amnesty further noted that the presence of Hamas weapons in civilian areas is not "conclusive evidence of intent to use civilians as 'human shields'" and that Israel also situates military bases in residential areas.

Human Rights Watch (HRW) also stated they found no evidence that Hamas used human shields during the 2009 conflict. HRW investigated 19 incidents involving 53 civilian deaths in Gaza that Israel said were the result of Hamas fighting in densely populated areas and did not find evidence for existence of Palestinian fighters in the areas at the time of the Israeli attack. In other cases where no civilians had died, the report concluded that Hamas may have deliberately fired rockets from areas close to civilians. HRW also investigated 11 deaths that Israel said were civilians being used as human shields by Hamas. HRW found no evidence that the civilians were used as human shields, nor had they been shot in crossfire. The Israeli 'human shields' charge against Hamas was called "full of holes" by The National (UAE), which stated that only Israel accused Hamas of using human shields during the conflict, though Hamas "may be guilty" of "locating military objectives within or near densely populated areas" and for "deliberately firing indiscriminate weapons into civilian populated areas".

When the UN-sponsored Goldstone Commission Report on the Gaza War was commissioned in 2009, it stated that it "found no evidence that Palestinian combatants mingled with the civilian population with the intention of shielding themselves from attack" though they deemed credible reports that Palestinian militants were "not always dressed in a way that distinguished them from civilians". Hamas MP Fathi Hamed stated that "For the Palestinian people, death has become an industry, at which women excel...the elderly excel at this...and so do the children. This is why they have formed human shields of the women, the children." Following the release of the Goldstone Report, the former commander of the British forces in Afghanistan Colonel Richard Kemp was invited to testify at the UN Human Rights Council 12th Special Session that during Operation Cast Lead, Israel encountered an "enemy that deliberately positioned its military capability behind the human shield of the civilian population".

Hamas has also been criticized by Israeli officials for blending into or hiding among the Palestinian civilian population during the 2008–2009 Israel–Gaza conflict. The Israeli government published what it said was video evidence of human shield tactics by Hamas. Israel said that Hamas frequently used mosques and school yards as hideouts and places to store weapons, and that Hamas militants stored weapons in their homes, making it difficult to ensure that civilians close to legitimate military targets are not hurt during Israeli military operations. Israeli officials also accused the Hamas leadership of hiding under Shifa Hospital during the conflict, using the patients inside to deter an Israeli attack.

In 2009, the Israeli government filed a report to the United Nations accusing Hamas of exploiting its rules of engagement by shooting rockets and launching attacks within protected civilian areas. Israel says 12,000 rockets and mortars were fired at it between 2000 and 2008—nearly 3,000 in 2008 alone.

In one case, an errant Israeli mortar strike killed dozens of people near a UN school. Hamas said that the mortar killed 42 people and left dozens wounded. Israel said that Hamas militants had launched a rocket from a yard adjacent to the school and one mortar of three rounds hit the school, due to a GPS error. According to the Israeli military probe, the remaining two rounds hit the yard used to launch rockets into Israel, killing two members of Hamas's military wing who fired the rockets.

Human Rights Watch called Hamas to "publicly renounce" the rocket attacks against Israeli civilians and hold those responsible to account. Human Rights Watch program director Iain Levine said the attacks by Hamas were "unlawful and unjustifiable, and amount to war crimes", and accused Hamas of putting Palestinians at risk by launching attacks from built-up areas. A Hamas spokesman replied that the report was "biased" and denied that Hamas uses human shields.

After the 2012 Israeli operation in the Gaza Strip, Human Rights Watch stated that Palestinian groups had endangered civilians by "repeatedly fired rockets from densely populated areas, near homes, businesses, and a hotel" and noted that under international law, parties to a conflict may not place military targets in or near densely populated areas. One rocket was launched close to the Shawa and Housari Building, where various Palestinian and international media have offices; another was fired from the yard of a house near the Deira Hotel. The New York Times journalist Steven Erlanger reported that "Hamas rocket and weapons caches, including rocket launchers, have been discovered in and under mosques, schools and civilian homes." Another report published by Intelligence and Terrorism Information Center revealed that Hamas used close to 100 mosques to store weapons and as launch-pads to shoot rockets. The report contains testimony from variety Palestinian sources, including a Hamas militant Sabhi Majad Atar, who said he was taught how to shoot rockets from inside a mosque.

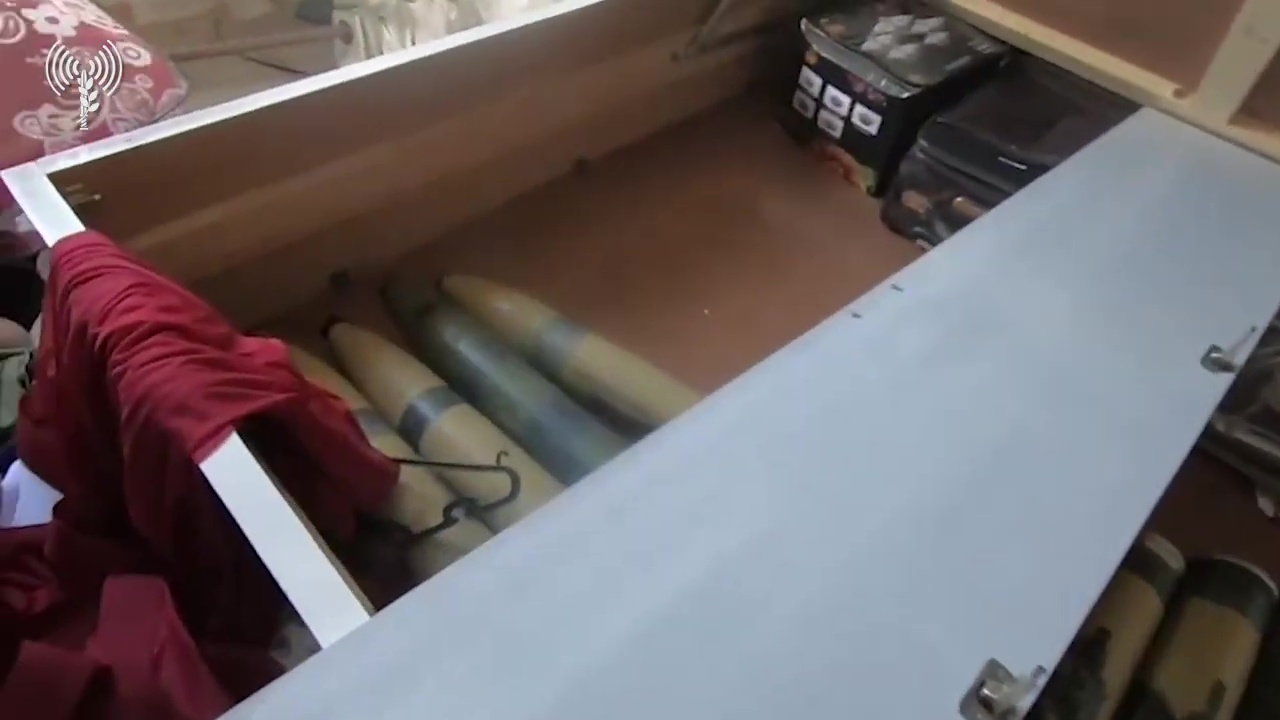
Rockets hidden under a girl's bed in Gaza

On 13 October 2023, Hamas told Gaza residents not to respond to Israel’s evacuation order. The spokesperson of Hamas' Al-Qassam Brigades, Abu Obaida, urged Palestinians not to evacuate despite Israel warning of a potential ground invasion in response to the October 7 attack on Israel.

Israel has accused Hamas of using children as human shields. The Israeli government released video footage in which it claims two militants are shown grabbing a young boy's arm from behind holding him to walk in front of them toward a group of people waiting near a wall. The Israel Defense Forces (IDF) argues the militants were placing the boy between themselves and an Israeli sniper. The second scene shows an individual, described as a terrorist, grabbing a school boy off of a floor, where he is hiding behind a column from IDF fire, and using him as a human shield to walk to a different location. After 15 alleged militants sought refuge in a mosque from Israeli forces, the BBC reported that Hamas radio instructed local women to go the mosque to protect the militants. Israeli forces later opened fire and killed two women.

In November 2006, the Israeli Air Force warned Muhammad Weil Baroud, commander of the Popular Resistance Committees who are accused of launching rockets into Israeli territory, to evacuate his home in a Jabalia refugee camp apartment block in advance of a planned Israeli air strike. Baroud responded by calling for volunteers to protect the apartment block and nearby buildings and, according to The Jerusalem Post, hundreds of local residents, mostly women and children, responded. Israel suspended the air strike. Israel termed the action an example of Hamas using human shields. In response to the incident, Hamas proclaimed: "We won. From now on we will form human chains around every house threatened with demolition." In a 22 November press release, Human Rights Watch condemned Hamas, stating: "There is no excuse for calling civilians to the scene of a planned attack. Whether or not the home is a legitimate military target, knowingly asking civilians to stand in harm's way is unlawful." Following criticism, Human rights Watch issued a statement saying that their initial assessment of the situation was in error. They stated that, on the basis of available evidence, the home demolition was in fact an administrative act, viewed in the context of Israel's longstanding policy of punitive home demolitions, not a military act and thus would not fall within the purview of the law regulating hostilities during armed conflict, which had been the basis for their initial criticism of Hamas.

== Children as combatants ==
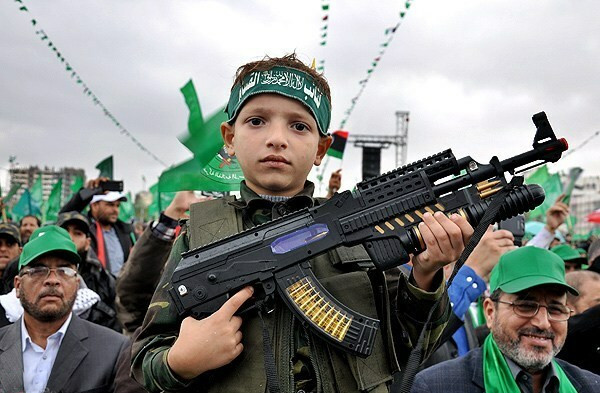
Child supporter of Hamas in December 2012

In the early intifada period, children in Gaza and the West Bank were instilled by Hamas with Islamic and military values. Evidence from 2001 shows that kindergarten children attended ceremonies where they wore emblematic uniforms and bore mock rifles. Some were dressed up as suicide bombers, whose readiness to die for the cause was held up as a model to be imitated. The preschoolers would swear an oath 'to pursue jihad, resistance and intifada.' At summer camps, alongside Quranic studies and familiarization with computers, courses were given that included military training.

Although Hamas admits to sponsoring summer schools to train teenagers in handling weapons they condemn attacks by children. Following the deaths of three teenagers during a 2002 attack on Netzarim in central Gaza, Hamas banned attacks by children and "called on the teachers and religious leaders to spread the message of restraint among young boys".

The use of child labor by Hamas to build tunnels has also been criticized.

== Alleged misuse of humanitarian aid ==
=== Global fundraising and diversion allegations ===
Since 2024, Hamas has faced international sanctions and criminal investigations over allegations that it diverts humanitarian donations through a global network of "sham charities."

On March 27, 2024, the United Kingdom and United States jointly sanctioned the media outlet Gaza Now and its founder, Mustafa Ayash. Government officials alleged they acted as "key financial facilitators" by using cryptocurrency and European bank accounts to solicit donations for Hamas under the guise of providing aid.

In October 2024, the U.S. Treasury formally designated the Charity Association of Solidarity with the Palestinian People (ABSPP) in Italy as a terrorist-linked entity, freezing its assets and prohibiting banks from processing its transactions. The Treasury accused its leader, Mohammad Hannoun, of raising money for Hamas’s military while claiming the funds were for medical supplies and food.

On December 27, 2025, Italian authorities in Genoa arrested nine people, including Hannoun, for allegedly diverting €7 million ($8.2 million) in donations to Hamas-linked entities. Investigators from the National Anti-Mafia and Counterterrorism Directorate stated that over 71% of the income from three implicated Italian charities reached the militant group via intermediaries in Turkey.

In February 2026, French authorities indicted five individuals associated with the NGOs Humani’Terre and the Comité de Bienfaisance et de soutien de la Palestine (CBSP) on suspicion of channeling funds to Hamas while presenting the transfers as humanitarian aid. According to the French National Anti-Terrorism Prosecutor’s Office (PNAT), the suspects were charged with financing a terrorist enterprise, breach of trust, and organized money laundering. Analysts cited by Reuters have reported that Hamas is alleged to exploit international charities and other financial networks to circumvent sanctions and funnel funds to its operations, a pattern consistent with these recent French indictments.

=== Aid distribution In the Gaza Strip ===
Israeli government officials and some international actors have repeatedly alleged that humanitarian aid delivered to the Gaza Strip is at risk of diversion by Hamas, the de facto governing authority, and have cited such claims in support of restrictions on aid delivery.

In 2025, major international humanitarian organizations operating in Gaza, as well as multiple investigative media reports, have stated that they have found no evidence of systematic or large-scale theft of aid by Hamas.

In July 2025, The New York Times reported that senior Israeli military officials acknowledged there was no evidence that Hamas systematically stole United Nations humanitarian aid in Gaza, despite public claims by Israeli political leaders. Other reporting described incidents of looting as arising from criminal activity, social breakdown, and emerging local power struggles rather than being directed by Hamas, and stated that official Israeli accusations lacked supporting evidence.

Reporting by humanitarian groups and journalists has characterized the aid distribution environment in Gaza as highly unstable following the collapse of civil order. A March 2024 investigation in The Guardian described aid convoys operating in a "near-anarchic situation," with hijackings carried out by various armed groups and civilians, and noted that the strongest actors often reach supplies first. The report identified primary obstacles to aid delivery as Israel's siege, an "often arbitrary" inspection regime at border crossings, and the rejection of items under broad "dual-use" restrictions, rather than systematic confiscation by Hamas.

An August 2025 Al Jazeera investigation further reported that newly formed, Israel-aligned tribal militias were involved in seizing humanitarian aid shipments, contributing to the fragmentation of aid distribution networks.

In July 2026, the United Nations alleged Hamas was disrupting aid distribution in the Gaza Strip. The UN released an official statement, authored by United Nations Deputy Special Coordinator for the Middle East Peace Process Ramiz Alakbarov, stating in part:

"These incidents are not isolated. They are completely unacceptable and reflect an increasingly dangerous pattern of intimidation, violence and obstruction, including smuggling attempts, targeting and abusing humanitarian operations[...] They are placing humanitarian workers at risk, disrupting the delivery of life-saving assistance, and further constraining the ability of humanitarian organizations to operate at a time when civilians across Gaza continue to face immense and pressing humanitarian conditions[...]"

Alakbarov did not name Hamas, instead referring to the "de facto authorities" of the Gaza Strip. Hamas denied Alakbarov's allegations, stating:

"The incident at the World Food Programme (WFP) food distribution center in the Abu Rashid area of Jabalia Refugee Camp was neither a 'raid,' an 'attack,' nor an 'obstruction' of humanitarian work, as falsely claimed[...]"

In response, the World Food Program suspended its operations in parts of Gaza.

== Political freedoms ==
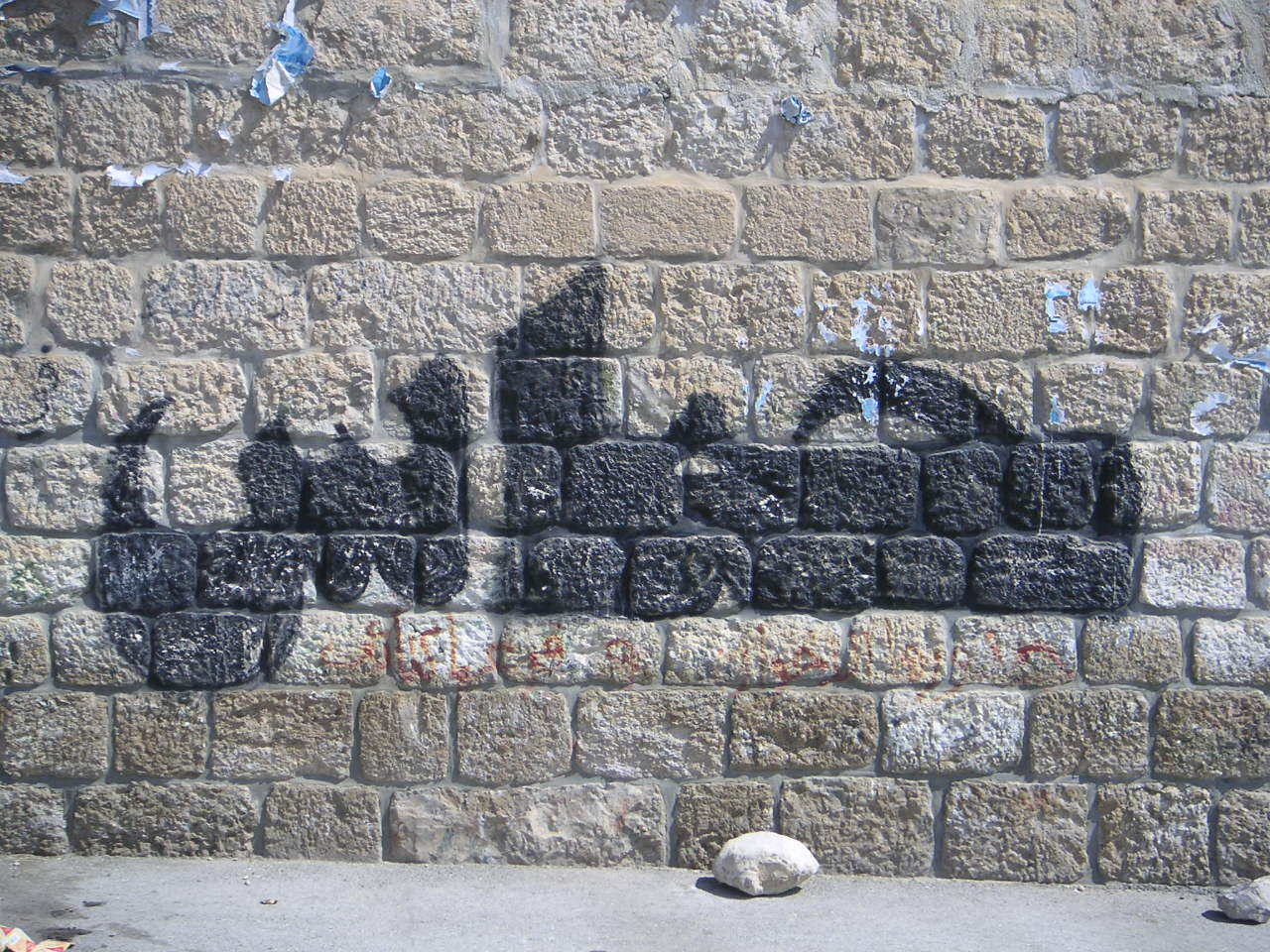
Hamas mural in the West Bank

=== Postponement of elections ===
Gaza's last presidential election was the 2005 Palestinian presidential election, which Fatah won. And the last legislative election was the 2006 Palestinian legislative election, which Hamas won with 44.45% of the vote and 74 of the 132 seats, while the previous ruling Fatah received only 41.43% of the vote and only 45 seats. But since the June 2007 Hamas takeover of the Gaza Strip, de facto governance of the Gaza Strip has been controlled by Hamas without any free elections. Gaza Strip's electoral process has thus received Freedom House's worst score.

=== Press restrictions ===
Human rights groups and Gazans have accused the Hamas government in the Gaza Strip of restricting freedom of the press and forcefully suppressing dissent. Both foreign and Palestinian journalists report harassment and other measures taken against them. In September 2007, the Gaza Interior Ministry disbanded the Gaza Strip branch of the pro-Fatah Union of Palestinian Journalists, a move criticized by Reporters Without Borders. In November 2007, the Hamas government arrested a British journalist and for a time canceled all press cards in Gaza. On 8 February 2008, Hamas banned distribution of the pro-Fatah Al-Ayyam newspaper, and closed its offices in the Gaza Strip because it ran a caricature that mocked legislators loyal to Hamas. The Gaza Strip Interior Ministry later issued an arrest warrant for the editor.

In late August 2007 Hamas was accused in The Telegraph, a conservative British newspaper, of torturing, detaining, and firing on unarmed protesters who had objected to policies of the Hamas government. Palestinian health officials also reported that the Hamas government had been shutting down Gaza clinics in retaliation for doctor strikes. The Hamas government confirmed the "punitive measure against doctors" because, in its view, they had incited other doctors to suspend services and go out on strike. In September 2007 the Hamas government banned public prayers after Fatah supporters began holding worship sessions that quickly escalated into raucous protests against Hamas rule. Government security forces beat several gathering supporters and journalists. In October 2008, the Hamas government announced it would release all political prisoners in custody in Gaza. Several hours after the announcement, 17 Fatah members were released.

On 2 August 2012, the International Federation of Journalists (IFJ) accused Hamas of harassing elected officials belonging to the Palestinian Journalists' Syndicate (PJS) in Gaza. The IFJ said that journalists' leaders in Gaza have faced a campaign of intimidation, as well as threats designed to force them to stop their union work. Some of these journalists are now facing charges of illegal activities and a travel ban, due to their refusal "to give in to pressure". The IFJ said that these accusations are "malicious" and "should be dropped immediately". The IFJ explained that the campaign against PJS members began in March 2012, after their election, and included a raid organized by Hamas supporters who took over the PJS offices in Gaza with the help of the security forces, and subsequently evicted the staff and elected officials. Other harassment includes the targeting of individuals who were bullied into stopping union work. The IFJ backed the PJS and called on Prime Minister Ismail Haniyeh to intervene to stop "his officials' unwarranted interference in journalists' affairs". In November 2012, two Gazan journalists were prevented from leaving Gaza by Hamas. There were scheduled to participate in a conference in Cairo, Egypt. After being questioned by security forces, their passports were confiscated.

In 2016 Reporters Without Borders condemned Hamas for censorship and torturing journalists. Reporters Without Borders Secretary-General Christophe Deloire said "As living conditions in the Gaza Strip are disastrous, Hamas wants to silence critics and does not hesitate to torture a journalist in order to control media coverage in its territory."

Reporting on the dangers faced by Gazan journalists in 2023-2044, Haaretz reporter Sheren Falah Saab writes that if they dare to criticize Hamas or write what is happening in the Hamas government, they will pay with their lives.

== Human rights abuses ==
In June 2011, the Independent Commission for Human Rights based in Ramallah published a report whose findings included that the Palestinians in the West Bank and the Gaza Strip were subjected in 2010 to an "almost systematic campaign" of human rights abuses by the Palestinian Authority (PA) and Hamas, as well as by Israeli authorities, with the security forces belonging to the PA and Hamas being responsible for torture, arrests and arbitrary detentions.

In 2012, Human Rights Watch (HRW) presented a 43-page long list of human rights violations committed by Hamas. Among actions attributed to Hamas, the HRW report mentions beatings with metal clubs and rubber hoses, hanging of alleged collaborationists with Israel, and torture of 102 individuals. According to the report, Hamas also tortured civil society activists and peaceful protesters. Reflecting on the captivity of Gilad Shalit, the HRW report described it as "cruel and inhuman". The report also slams Hamas for harassment of people based on so-called morality offenses and for media censorship. In a public statement Joe Stork, the deputy Middle East director of HRW claimed, "after five years of Hamas rule in Gaza, its criminal justice system reeks of injustice, routinely violates detainees' rights and grants impunity to abusive security services." Hamas responded by denying charges and describing them as "politically motivated".

On 26 May 2015, Amnesty International released a report saying that Hamas carried out extrajudicial killings, abductions and arrests of Palestinians and used the Al-Shifa Hospital to detain, interrogate and torture suspects during the 2014 Israel–Gaza conflict. It details the executions of at least 23 Palestinians accused of collaborating with Israel and torture of dozens of others, many victims of torture were members of rival Palestinian movement Fatah.

In 2019, Osama Qawassmeh, a Fatah spokesman in the West Bank, accused Hamas of "kidnapping and brutally torturing Fatah members in a way that no Palestinian can imagine." Qawassmeh accused Hamas of kidnapping and torturing 100 Fatah members in Gaza. The torture allegedly included the practice called "shabah"—the painful binding of the hands and feet to a chair. Also in 2019, Fatah activist from Gaza Raed Abu al-Hassin was beaten and had his two legs broken by Hamas security officers. Al-Hassin was taken into custody by Hamas after he participated in a pro-Abbas demonstration in the Gaza Strip.

in 2024, United Nations released reports on ongoing Israel-Hamas war which Israel government and Hamas commit human rights abuse

== Disparity between elite protection and public suffering ==
In early 2023, reports surfaced that prominent Hamas officials had relocated to luxury accommodations in cities such as Beirut, Doha, and Istanbul. Their comfortable lifestyles abroad sparked frustration among Palestinians, many of whom remained confined to Gaza, grappling with economic collapse and the long-term impact of repeated conflicts with Israel.

A January 2024 investigation revealed growing public anger over the stark contrast between the suffering of ordinary Gazans and the extravagant lifestyles of Hamas leaders and their families. While Gaza endured poverty, siege, and destruction, many senior Hamas figures—such as Ismail Haniyeh, Mousa Abu Marzouk, Khaled Mashal, and Ghazi Hamad—lived abroad in Qatar, Turkey, and Malaysia, accumulating vast personal wealth. Their children and relatives, often referred to as "Hamas nepo babies," reportedly enjoyed lives of luxury, hosting lavish parties, traveling extensively, and displaying their affluence on social media.

Critics accused these leaders of enriching themselves through networks of private assets, properties, and businesses funded partly by heavy taxes on essential goods in Gaza and international aid meant for the population. During the war, Israeli forces uncovered large amounts of cash and receipts for luxury purchases in homes linked to Hamas officials. Some leaders were reported to have registered assets under relatives’ names, while their children invested in real estate abroad and frequented five-star hotels and upscale clubs.

The hypocrisy of Hamas leaders calling for resistance while living safely and comfortably abroad drew sharp criticism from Gazans. Activists and analysts argued that Hamas had long prioritized its own wealth and power over the welfare of the people, fueling widespread resentment and a deepening sense of betrayal.

In January 2025, Samar Abu Zamer, the widow of Hamas military commander Yahya Sinwar, reportedly left Gaza using a forged passport, aided by high-level coordination and foreign contacts. Though unconfirmed by Hamas, the news has sparked growing anger among Gazans still trapped under siege. Many see the departures—and the luxurious lifestyles of some officials abroad—as evidence that Hamas leaders prioritize their own safety and comfort while ordinary residents endure bombings, poverty, and loss. "They send their children to study in Turkey and Qatar—and send ours to the grave," one Gazan said, reflecting widespread resentment and comparisons to corrupt elites in the region.

== See also ==
- Hamas war crimes
- Capital punishment in the Gaza Strip
- Asma al-Ghul
- Public diplomacy of Israel
