= 1946 in Italy =

- Decades: 1920s; 1930s; 1940s; 1950s; 1960s
- See also: History of Italy; Timeline of Italian history; List of years in Italy

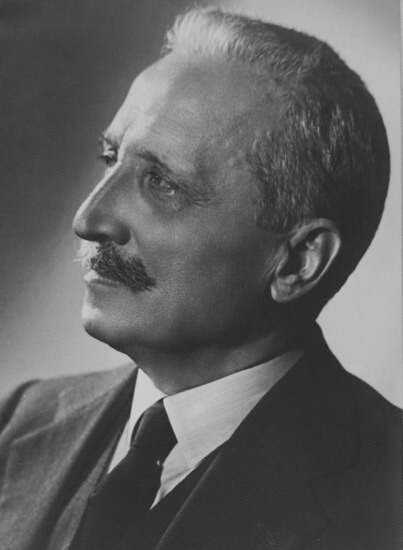
Enrico de Nicola, Provisional Head of State of Italy

Events from the year 1946 in Italy.

== Incumbents ==
- King – Umberto II (9 May – 12 June)
- Head of State (Provisional) – Enrico De Nicola (from 28 June 1946)
- Prime Minister – Alcide De Gasperi (10 December 1945 – 13 July 1946 for the first government; 13 July 1946 – 2 February 1947 for the second government)

== Events ==
- 16 March – The Italian government, led by Prime Minister Alcide De Gasperi, officially set 2 June 1946 as the date for both the institutional referendum on the monarchy and the election of a Constituent Assembly.
- 25 April – The first anniversary of the Liberation of Italy was celebrated, commemorating the end of Fascist rule in northern Italy in 1945.
- 29 April – Premier De Gasperi telegraphed the "Big Four" Foreign Ministers meeting in Paris to protest that Italy's fate was being settled without allowing Italian statesmen to be heard. He requested that Italian experts be allowed to present their case before committees dealing with naval and financial questions, invoking the Allies' proclamations of "democratic methods of consultation".
- 9 May – King Victor Emmanuel III abdicated in favour of his son, who became Umberto II.
- 2 June – The 1946 Italian institutional referendum and the elections for the Constituent Assembly were held. It was the first free election in Italy after the fall of the Fascist regime and the first national vote in which Italian women were allowed to vote. Voter turnout was 89.1% of the 28,005,449 eligible voters.
- 5 June – The Ministry of the Interior announced the provisional results of the institutional referendum, showing a majority in favor of the Republic. Vice Premier Pietro Nenni announced that the cabinet met to "plan the king's departure."
- 10 June – The Supreme Court of Cassation announced the provisional results of the referendum at Palazzo Montecitorio. Based on reports received, the Court announced 12,672,767 votes for the republic and 10,688,905 for the monarchy, with 118 precincts not yet reported.
- 12 June – The royal standard was lowered from the Quirinal Palace. The monarchy formally ended, and Umberto II left the country for exile in Portugal the next day.
- 18 June – The Supreme Court of Cassation definitively confirmed the results of the referendum: 12,718,641 votes (54.3%) for the Republic and 10,718,502 (45.7%) for the Monarchy.
- 28 June – The newly elected Constituent Assembly elected Enrico De Nicola as the provisional Head of State with 396 votes out of 504.
- 1 July – Enrico De Nicola assumed the office of Provisional Head of State.
- 13 July – The Second De Gasperi government was formed, the first government of the Italian Republic. The Cabinet included eight Christian Democrats, four Communists, four Socialists, two Republicans and one independent.
- 29 July – 15 October – The Paris Peace Conference was held. De Gasperi delivered a speech on 10 August defending Italy's position in the post-war settlement, criticizing the proposed terms regarding Trieste and the Julian March.
- 10 November – Municipal elections were held in Rome, Turin, Genoa, Florence, Naples and Palermo. The Christian Democrats suffered significant defeats, with some observers forecasting a cabinet crisis.
- December – Work began in earnest on the new Italian Constitution within the Constituent Assembly, a process that would continue into the following year.

== Constituent Assembly election results ==
The 1946 election for the Constituent Assembly resulted in the following composition for the 556-seat assembly, with 535 elected from Italy (the remainder were from special constituencies):

- Christian Democracy (DC) – 207 seats (35.2%)
- Italian Socialist Party (PSI) – 115 seats (20.7%)
- Italian Communist Party (PCI) – 104 seats (18.9%)
- National Democratic Union (UDN) – 41 seats (6.8%)
- Common Man's Front (UQ) – 30 seats (5.3%)
- Others (including PRI, PLI, DL, and PdA) – 59 seats (13.1%)

== See also ==
- 1946 Italian institutional referendum
- 1946 Italian general election
- Constituent Assembly of Italy
- History of the Italian Republic
- Paris Peace Treaties, 1947
