= Pratesi =

Pratesi is an Italian surname. Notable people with the surname include:

- Franco Pratesi (born 1940), Italian scientist and games historian
- Fulco Pratesi (1934–2025), Italian environmentalist, journalist and politician
- Ottavio Pratesi (1889–1977), Italian racing cyclist
