= 1943 in Italy =

- Decades: 1920s; 1930s; 1940s; 1950s; 1960s
- See also: History of Italy; Timeline of Italian history; List of years in Italy

Events from the year 1943 in Italy. This year was dominated by Italy's participation in the Second World War, where Italy initially strove to establish a new Roman Empire. Following the Allied invasion of Italy, longtime Italian dictator and Duce Benito Mussolini was toppled, alongside his regime, with the new government signing an armistice with the Allied powers. Italy declared war on axis-power and ally Germany, joining the Allies as a co-belligerent. Germany responded by disarming the Italian military, freeing Mussolini, and establishing the Italian Social Republic, continuing the Italian campaign.

== Incumbents ==
=== Kingdom of Italy ===
- King of Italy – Victor Emmanuel III
- Prime Minister and Il Duce – Benito Mussolini, until July 25, then Pietro Badoglio as Prime Minister

=== Italian Social Republic ===
- Duce della Repubblica Sociale Italiana – Benito Mussolini (from September)

== Events ==
- 3 January – British forces launch a human torpedo attack in Palermo; the light cruiser Ulpio and a tanker are damaged.
- 14–23 January – At the Casablanca Conference, the two primary Western allied powers: the United Kingdom and the United States arrive at a consensus over grand strategy in the European theatre. They agree to focus on the Mediterranean by invading Sicily; the Allied leaders also continue to demand Italy's unconditional surrender.
- 5 March – A strike wave takes place throughout northern Italy, reaching Milan and other cities of Lombardy in late March and continuing into April. Around 100,000 workers take part in Turin alone.
- 11 June – Allied forces invade and capture the island of Pantelleria, located close to key island of Sicily.
- 3 September
  - The Italian government, under Prime Minister Pietro Badoglio, signs an armistice with Allied forces.
  - Allied forces invade mainland Italy; Bernard Montgomery's Eighth Army crosses the Strait of Messina into southern Calabria.
- 9 September
  - Operation Avalanche occurs; allied forces, under the command of Mark Clark, land near the port of Salerno. Stiff resistance from German forces delays the full capture of the beachhead until 18 September.
  - British forces land at Taranto, in Apulia.

Literature and culture

== Births ==
- 6 January – Bruno Campanella, conductor (d. 2026)
- 4 March – Lucio Dalla, musician and actor (d. 2012)
- 5 March – Lucio Battisti, singer-songwriter (d. 1998)
- 18 June – Raffaella Carrà, TV Star, actress, and singer (d. 2021)
- 18 August – Gianni Rivera, footballer and politician

== Deaths ==
- 1 December – Antonio de Viti de Marco, liberal economist (b. 1858)

== See also ==
- Military history of Italy during World War II
