= Piccinelli =

Piccinelli is a surname. Notable people with the surname include:

- Alessandro Piccinelli (born 1997), Italian volleyball player
- Enea Piccinelli (1927–2025), Italian lawyer and politician
- Giorgio Piccinelli (1930–2000), Italian sprint canoer
- Neil Piccinelli (born 1967), Australian rugby league footballer
