= 1941 in Italy =

- Decades: 1920s; 1930s; 1940s; 1950s; 1960s
- See also: History of Italy; Timeline of Italian history; List of years in Italy

Events from the year 1941 in Italy. This year was dominated by Italy's participation in the Second World War, where Italy strove to establish a new Roman Empire.

== Incumbents ==
- King of Italy – Victor Emmanuel III
- Prime Minister and Il Duce – Benito Mussolini

== Events ==
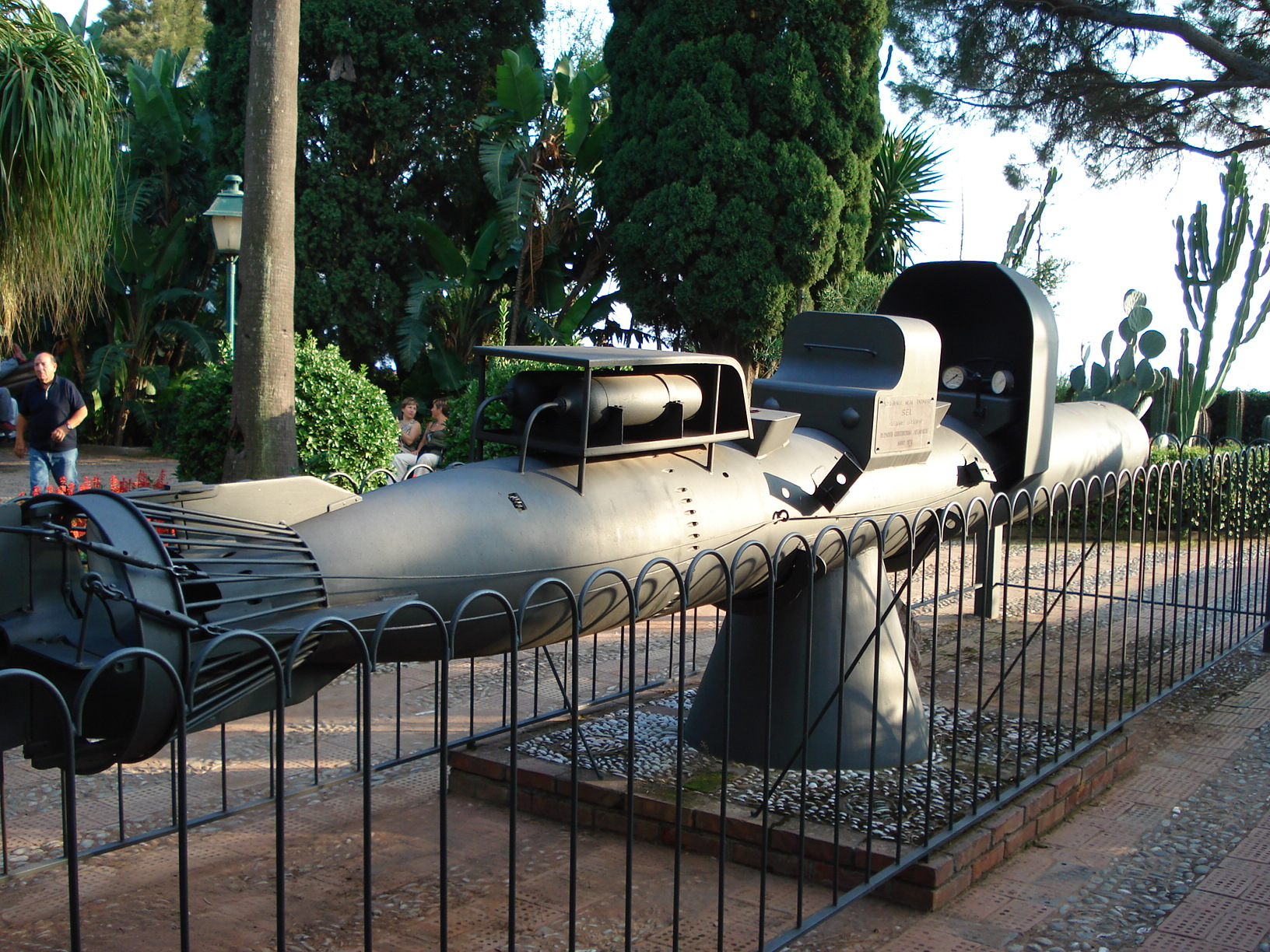
Italian human torpedo, similar to those used at the Raid on Alexandria

- 1–12 January – World War II – Mediterranean Front – Italian submarines Turchese, Ambra, Corridoni, Galatea, Tembien, Beilul, and Delfino, operate in the Eastern Mediterranean.
- 1–18 January – World War II – Battle of the Atlantic – Italian submarine Giacomo Nani, operating alongside submarine Glauco, is sunk by British corvette Anemone during an operation against convoy HX.99.
- 2 January – World War II – General Enno von Rintelen, former military attaché and chief representative of the Oberkommando der Wehrmacht (OKW) to Italy, dispatches a scathing report to the OKW over Italian military capabilities. In his report, Rintelen argues that increased German influence over the Italian Armed Forces is both warranted and necessary, causing a deterioration in relations between the two Axis powers.
- 2–3 January – World War II – North African Campaign – The Battle of Bardia occurs between Italian and Allied forces, primarily of the Australian Army, leading to the routing of the Italian Army and the fall of Bardia.
- 7 January – World War II – Mediterranean Front – Italian torpedo boats Cilo and Castore damage British submarine Rover; two days later, Rover damages an Italian sailboat.
- 19 January – World War II – The Sudan Defence Force, recently reinforced by the 4th Indian Division and the 5th Indian Division begins an offensive into Eritrea, under the control of Italian East Africa. This resumes the Northern Front of the East African Campaign.
- 22 January – World War II – North African Campaign – British forces capture Tobruk, forcing the surrender of around 30 thousand Italian soldiers and intact port facilities.
- 24 January – Italian forces in Libya are split near Mechili, following an engagement with the 4th Armored Brigade of the British Army.
- 11 February – World War II – North African Campaign – The German Afrika Korps, led by Erwin Rommel, a major general in the German Army, arrives in Italian Libya to support the Italian forces in the region.
- 6 April – World War II – Balkans Campaign – The Axis Powers, including Italy, invade Yugoslavia.
- 10 April – World War II – North African Campaign – Italian forces in Libya, in conjunction with the Afrika Korps, besiege Tobruk.
- 17 April – World War II – Balkans Campaign – Yugoslavia capitulates to the Axis invasion.
- 27 April – World War II – Balkans Campaign – Greece capitulates to a German led invasion following the failure of Italy's previous invasion in 1940.
- 19 June – World War II – The Axis Powers, including Italy, expel all United States consuls and diplomatic staff, with a vacation date of 15 July.
- 22 June – World War II – Eastern Front – Italy declares war on the Soviet Union, as a part of Operation Barbarossa, the Axis-invasion of the Soviet Union.
- 11 July – World War II – Seventeen Italian ships are seized in the United States under the Espionage Act of 1917.
- 27 September – World War II – Italy, Germany, and Japan sign the Tripartite Pact in Berlin. The Tripartite Pact creates a defensive pact between the three powers, intended against any potential intervention by the United States in either the European theatre or the Second Sino-Japanese War.
- 11 December – World War II – Italy, in conjunction with Germany, declare war on the United States, following the United States declaration of war on Japan and the attack on Pearl Harbor.
- 18 December – World War II – Mediterranean Front – Italy's Regia Marina launches a raid on Alexandria, a key port city in Egypt, disabling two battleships of the Mediterranean Fleet of the British Royal Navy.

== Births ==
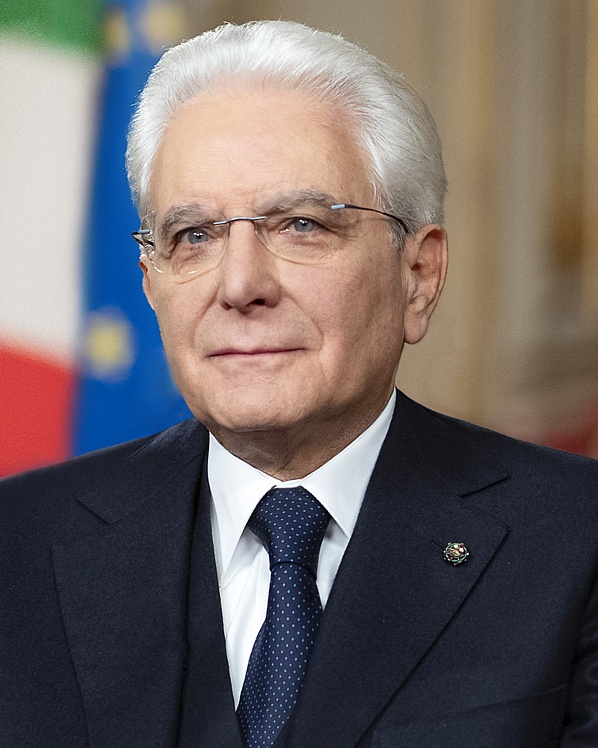
Sergio Mattarella, president of Italy since 2015

- 19 June – Gilberto Benetton, businessman and co-founder of Benetton Group (d. 2018)
- 23 July – Sergio Mattarella, president of Italy since 2015
- 26 September – Salvatore Accardo, violinist and conductor
- 3 October – Andrea de Adamich, racing driver (d. 2025)
- 1 December – Federico Faggin, physicist, engineer, inventor, and entrepreneur

== Deaths ==
- 15 February – Guglielmo Pecori Giraldi, general of the Italian 1st Army during World War I (b. 1856)
- 25 June – Luigi Capello, general during the Italo-Turkish War and World War I (b. 1859)
- 8 September – Giuseppe Amisani, painter (b. 1881)
- 29 December
  - Tullio Levi-Civita, mathematician (b. 1873)
  - Luigi Albertini, politician and founder of Corriere della Sera (b. 1871)

== See also ==
- Military history of Italy during World War II
