= Faito aerial tramway =

- Funivia del Faito
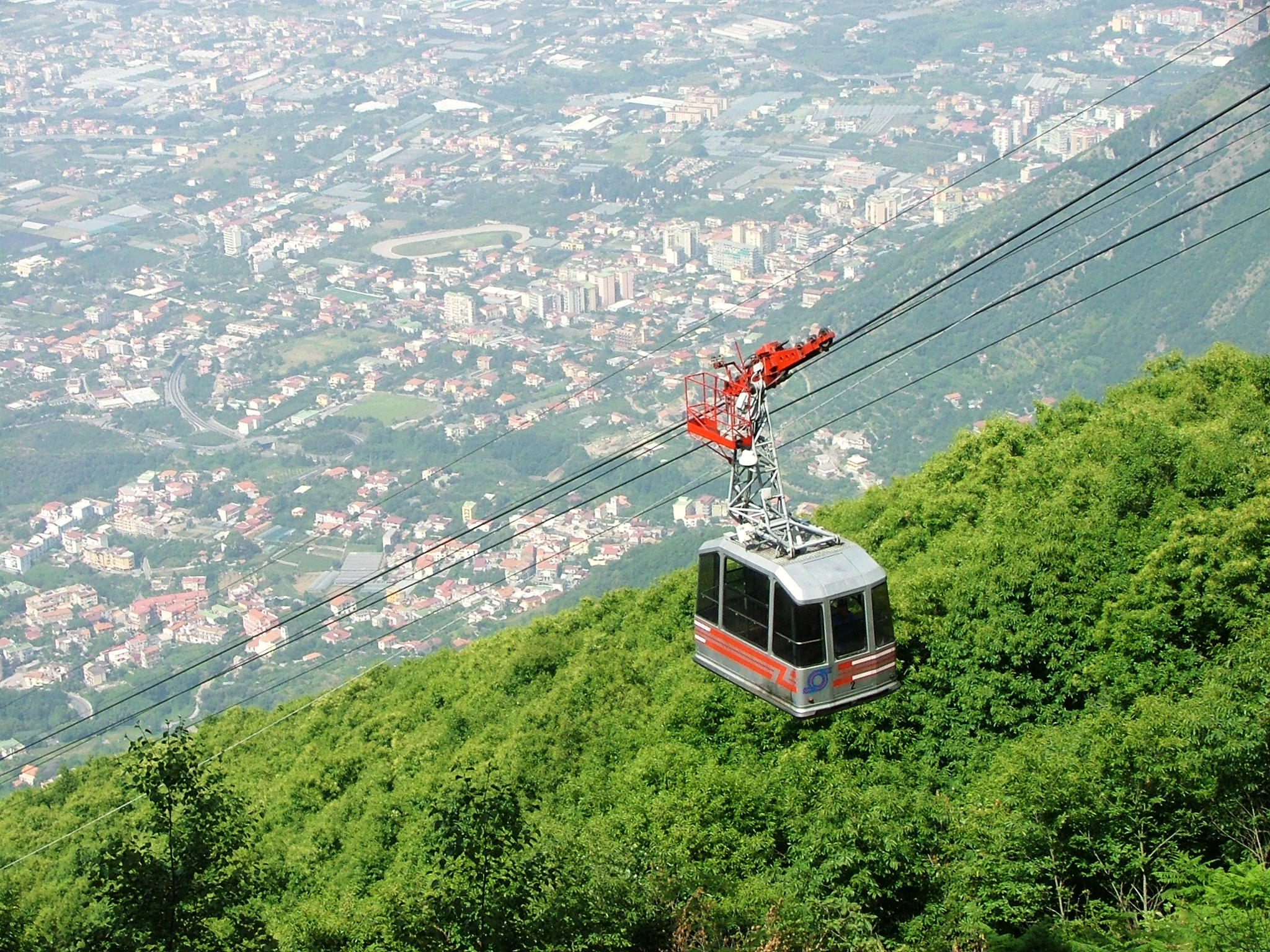
- Interactive map of Faito aerial tramway

Overview
- Coordinates: 40.7°N 14.48°E
- Elevation: lowest: 9 metres (30 ft) highest: 1,092 metres (3,583 ft)

Operation
- Carrier capacity: 36

Technical features
- Manufactured by: Ceretti Tanfani
- Line length: 2,945 metres (9,662 ft)
- Installed power: 180 kw
- Maximum Gradient: 60%

The Faito aerial tramway (Funivia del Faito) is an aerial tramway that connects the city of Castellammare di Stabia with the mountain Monte Faito from which it takes its name.

== History ==
=== Inauguration ===
The tramway was opened to the public on August 24, 1952.

== Accidents ==
=== August 15, 1960 ===
Because of a reported mistake during operations, a cabin could not stop when it reached the valley and fell onto the Circumvesuviana railway tracks below. Four people lost their lives and thirty-one others were injured.

=== April 17, 2025 ===
the tramway suffered a serious accident resulting in the deaths of four tourists and left one individual critically injured, who had to be airlifted to hospital. The incident happened near the summit of the mountain when one of the car’s support cables snapped. Another cable car on the same line was occupied at the time but its passengers were safely rescued. Rescue operations were hampered by poor weather conditions, including fog, wind, and rain, requiring occupants to be evacuated individually using harnesses.
