= Vivere (TV series) =

- Screenshot from the show's intro
- Genre: Soap opera
- Created by: Cristiana Farina and Lorenzo Favella
- Directed by: Daniele Carnacina and Massimo Del Frate
- Country of origin: Italy
- Original language: Italian
- No. of seasons: 10
- No. of episodes: 2130

Production
- Running time: 22–25 minutes
- Production company: Mediavivere

Original release
- Network: Canale 5
- Release: March 1, 1999 – May 23, 2008

Vivere ("Living") is an Italian soap opera created by Cristiana Farina and Lorenzo Favella that was originally broadcast from 1999 to 2007 on Canale 5 and afterwards from 2007 to 2008 on Rete 4, with reruns currently showing on La5 and Mediaset Italia. The series was directed by Daniele Carnacina and Massimo Del Frate.

Vivere was also the first fully Italian soap opera about hope, desire and dreams of four families. The series about four families which lives in Como, a rich, provincial town in Northern Italy. The protagonists of the story is Bonelli's, a family of restaurators from lower-middle class, Moretti's, whose head of the family a rich businessman and his handsome son a journalist, and a family of successful doctors De Carolis – Falcon. Plot of the series takes place in and around the ancient villas, hotels, restaurants, clinics and gyms. In this environment erupt private and public affairs whose consequences tension and intrigue such as arranged marriages, illicit love affairs, terrifying secrets and powerful games.

Guided by emotions, passions and dreams characters follow their heart, desires and instincts that are connected or separated. Such relationships built bittersweet picture of life in the Italian suburb, which is actually similar to the everyday life of each of us.

Dialogue writers, scriptwriters and directors have worked to make 5 episodes per week; episodes that were recorded indoors (30 fixed sets covering about 1400 m^{2}) and externally (5 new locations per week) moving a technical staff of over 80 people (for photography, in the studio Enzo Ghinassi, in external Nicola Civarelli). Internal filming was carried out at the Profit studios of Milan until July 2004. and subsequently they had been transferred to the television studios of TeleCittà in San Giusto Canavese, next to those of CentoVetrine. The external shots were taken in Como and in its province, especially in Cernobbio.

The soap opera dealt with the life of the members of the various main families, told in the background of a rich provincial town, Como. Over the years there have been numerous families: Bonelli, Gherardi, Falcon/De Carolis, Canale/Leoni, Moretti/Monteleone/Sarpi, Blasi, Draghi and Ponti.

In the month of October 2007, Mediaset has decided to abandon the soap opera for low viewership which had to the restyling that it has quickly and Vivere from 26 December 2007 is moved on Rete 4, the 22 resumptions were finished February 2008 and the episodes were being broadcast until 23 May 2008.

In Croatia, it was broadcast from May to August 2003 (only 60 episodes from Season 1) and reprised from July to late October 2006 (approx. 85 episodes).

As of 2023, the entire series has been made available through Mediaset Infinity.

== History ==
Vivere was broadcast for the first time in 1999 on Canale 5, at 2.15 pm, immediately after the US soap opera Beautiful, immediately achieving a success consolidated over time. The same location was maintained for the soap until January 2001, a period during which it reached its apex of viewers (over 5 and a half million viewers and a share over 35%).

From January 2001 the time was entrusted to the 12:25, to revive the fate of the problematic midday channel of Canale 5 and to leave room for the then-new television series CentoVetrine. In this new location, the soap despite having a decline in audience, has maintained a good response from the public and a high share, often reaching three million viewers and a share of over 22%. But since the end of 2006 it has had a further collapse that has brought the number of viewers to fall below two million per episode.

In the spring of 2007, on the other hand, the comeback: often manages to climb the threshold of two million, gathering a high share for that time slot and daily undermining the success of La prova del cuoco. During the summer of 2007 it was moved to the time of 2.45 pm, obtaining very good viewing results. In September 2007, Vivere underwent a major restyling through which many characters abandoned the soap, including Emilia, Vincenzo, Michele, Flavia, Carla, Christian and Daria, leaving their events unfinished in many cases and tell only in words.

From the first episode of September 2007, viewers have witnessed a time jump: the stories of the remaining characters have been renewed and the Ponti family has been inserted; in addition, the soap finds its old time schedule at 12:25. Because of this restyling, which has not reached the expected success, the soap has suffered a further drop in audience and Mediaset has announced its closure, leaving about 200 people without work. For the same reason, the soap has been moved to Rete 4 since the end of December 2007 and was broadcast until noon, where it collected over one million viewers, with a share of 10% -12%, figures very good for the network and the airing time.

The last episode was followed by 962.000 viewers (11.92% share). The entire soap opera has remained in the memory of viewers mainly due to the love affair between Eva Bonelli, a young daughter of Giovanni and Mirella's first-born daughter, and Alfio Gherardi, a rich textile entrepreneur known throughout Como, her father's best friend, already married to Letizia Visconti (from whom, following this relationship, she will get a divorce) and father of three children: Adriana, Andrea (husband of Chiara, sister of Eva) and Alice. This relationship has never resulted in a marriage, which would thus have united the two leading families in a definitive way.

== Main cast ==
Actor	Character
Elisabetta De Palo	Mirella Bonelli
Giorgio Biavati	Giovanni Bonelli
Veronika Logan	Chiara Bonelli
Beatrice Luzzi	Eva Bonelli
Manuela Maletta	Lisa Bonelli
Paolo Calissano	Bruno De Carolis
Giorgio Ginex	Giacomo Falcon
Roger Mantovani	Sandro Colussi
