= Dolly Van Doll =

Italian vedette and writer (1938–2025)

Carla Follis (1938 – 13 October 2025), known by her stage name Dolly Van Doll, was an Italian trans vedette, businesswoman and artist who developed most of her career in Spain. She was especially known for her music hall performances in the 1960s and 70s and for her role in Barcelona's nightlife scene.

== Life and career ==
Dolly Van Doll was born in Turin, Italy in 1938, and from a young age expressed her identity as a trans woman. At age three, she already said she wanted to be a dancer, and by age ten, she expressed her desire to be a woman. Her childhood was also marked by the events of World War II in Italy.

In the 1960s, Van Doll worked in Berlin (at the cabaret Chez Nous), Hamburg (at Bar-Celona), and Paris, where by 1962 she had become the leading performer at the cabaret Le Carrousel de Paris. In 1964, she underwent gender-affirming surgery in Casablanca, performed by Dr. Georges Burou, becoming one of the first Italian trans women to undergo this surgery. At that time, she rose to fame in the French trans scene.

After a heartbreak, Dolly moved to Spain in 1971, where she quickly began performing at Sala Gambrinus in Barcelona. That same year, she also performed at the renowned Barcelona de Noche. In 1972, she debuted with the show Noches de otoño, followed by Delirio de estrellas and Loco, loco cabaret. In 1974, she performed in the show Travestí at the Teatre Victòria, and in 1976 she was master of ceremonies in a performance that launched the career of famous Argentine drag artist Ángel Pavlovsky. Van Doll also influenced Angie Von Pritt during this period.

After performing at other venues such as Blue Moon and Red Sun, she moved to Valencia with her then-boyfriend Fernando, whom she later married. In Valencia, she opened her own venue, Belle Époque, inaugurated during Christmas of 1976. In 1982, she opened a second Belle Époque in Barcelona, located on Muntaner Street, and the following year she performed in the New Year's Eve gala on TV3.

She played a small role in the 1988 film Entreacte, starring Rosario Flores. That same year she closed her Valencia venue, and in 1995, she also closed the one in Barcelona. In 2007, she published her autobiographical book De niño a mujer. Un canto a la libertad, al amor y la dignidad, narrating her life story up to that point.

Van Doll died from a stroke on 13 October 2025, at the age of 87.

== Stage shows (selected) ==
- Noches de otoño (1972)
- Delirio de estrellas (1972)
- Loco, loco cabaret (1973)
- Travestí (1974)
- Belle Epoque (1989)

== Filmography ==
- Per molts anys (1984)
- Arsenal (1985)
- Cinema 3 (1988)
- Entreacte (1989)
