= Paola Mauriello =

Italian Basketball player (1981–2025)

Paola Mauriello (27 March 1981 – 10 August 2025) was an Italian basketball player and coach.

== Club career ==
Mauriello began playing basketball at the age of 11 with the Family 93 of Caserta, continuing with the youth teams at Partenio Avellino where she remained from 1994 to 1999, also playing in Serie A2.

In the 1999–2000 season she moved to De Gasperi Termini Imerese, after a loan period at Basket Alcamo in Serie A2, she returned to Termini Imerese and obtained promotion to Serie A1. From the 2005–06 season she moved to Napoli Basket Vomero where she won the Italian Super Cup and played in EuroLeague Women. From the 2010–11 season she moved to Basket Parma, where she made 25 appearances. In the 2011–12 season she moved to Club Atletico Faenza Basketball.

== International career ==
In 1997 Mauriello participated in the European Junior Championships held in Sopron, Hungary.

In 2002 she made her debut in the Italian women's national basketball team. In 2009 she won the gold medal at the Mediterranean Games in Pescara.

== Death ==
Mauriello died on 10 August 2025, at the age of 44.
