= Giulia Barone =

Italian historian (1947–2025)

- Born: 1947; Milan, Italy
- Died: 29 August 2025 (aged 78); Rome, Italy
- Occupation: Historian

Giulia Barone (1947 – 29 August 2025) was an Italian historian, medievalist and paleographer.

== Life and work ==
Barone was born in Milan in 1947. She taught Medieval History at the Faculty of Letters and Philosophy of the Sapienza University of Rome, from which she graduated in 1970, discussing with the eminent medievalists Arsenio Frugoni and Raoul Manselli a thesis on Elijah of Cortona, later published, entitled "Friar Elias in the sources of the thirteenth century".

She obtained a diploma in the Vatican Secret Archives, for which she published several studies. She was also a professor of Medieval Antiquities in the Faculty of Letters and Philosophy of the Sapienza University from 1983, and from 1988 she was a member of the Teaching Board of the Doctorate in Medieval History at the University of Florence.

Barone died in Rome on 29 August 2025, at the age of 78.
