= Mario De Grassi (footballer, born 1937) =

Italian footballer (1937–2025)

Personal information
- Date of birth: 17 July 1937
- Place of birth: Monfalcone, Italy
- Date of death: 25 October 2025 (aged 88)
- Place of death: Udine, Italy
- Position: Midfielder

Senior career*
Years	Team	Apps	(Gls)
1957–1958	Monfalcone		
1958–1961	Triestina	71	(0)
1961–1965	Potenza	132	(0)
1965–1969	Casertana	65	(0)
1969–1970	Potenza	11	(0)
- * Club domestic league appearances and goals

Mario De Grassi (17 July 1937 – 25 October 2025) was an Italian footballer who played as a midfielder. He played in Serie A with Triestina. De Grassi died on 25 October 2025, at the age of 88.
