= Hugo Valentin (politician) =

Italian politician (1938–2025)

Hugo Valentin (28 April 1938 – 8 September 2025) was an Italian politician and advocate for the Ladin people and Ladin language. Valantin served as a member of the Landtag of South Tyrol, the provincial council of the autonomous province of South Tyrol from 1978 to 1993, while simultaneously serving as a member of the Regional Council of Trentino-Alto Adige/Südtirol, also from 1978 until 1993. He was a member of the South Tyrolean People's Party (SVP).

From 1983 until 1993, Valentin was member of the Trentino-Alto Adige/Südtirol regional government, where he oversaw the regional education system, schools and universities, as well as the promotion of the Ladins ethnic group and their culture and language. The Ladins are a minority ethnolinguistic group native to the Ladinia region of northern Italy. Valentin is widely credited with the introduction of new laws and regulations which recognized Ladin as an official language in South Tyrol and the expansion of Ladin civil services to promote language equality. Valentin also improved access to elected office for other Ladins.

Outside of politics, Valentin advocated for the cultural development and preservation of Ladins. He served as the chair of the Istitut Ladin Micurà de Rü, which promotes and studies the Ladin language.

Valentin died on 8 September 2025, at the age of 87.
