= Giuseppe Nocco =

Italian politician (1939–2025)

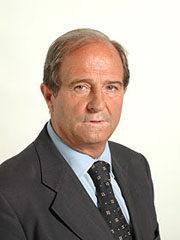
- Nocco in 2001

Member of the Senate of the Republic of Italy for Altamura
- In office 18 May 2001 – 27 April 2006

Personal details
- Born: Giuseppe Onorato Benito Nocco; 11 February 1939 Santeramo in Colle, Italy
- Died: 4 November 2025 (aged 86) Santeramo in Colle, Italy
- Party: FI
- Occupation: Lawyer

Giuseppe Onorato Benito Nocco (11 February 1939 – 4 November 2025) was an Italian politician. A member of Forza Italia, he served in the Senate of the Republic from 2001 to 2006.

Nocco died in Santeramo in Colle on 4 November 2025, at the age of 86.
