= Giancarlo Pasquini (politician) =

Italian politician (1937–2025)

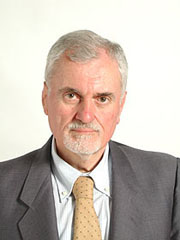
- Pasquini in 2001

Member of the Senate of the Republic of Italy for Bologna
- In office 9 May 1996 – 27 April 2006

Personal details
- Born: 20 October 1937 Bologna, Italy
- Died: 3 November 2025 (aged 88)
- Political party: DS

Giancarlo Pasquini (20 October 1937 – 3 November 2025) was an Italian politician. A member of the Democrats of the Left, he served in the Senate of the Republic from 1996 to 2006.

Pasquini died on 3 November 2025, at the age of 88.
