= Roger Mantovani =

Italian radio presenter and voice actor (1967–2025)

- Born: 23 October 1967; Milan, Italy
- Died: 2 January 2025 (aged 57); Palma de Mallorca, Spain
- Website: Official website

Roger Mantovani (23 October 1967 – 2 January 2025) was an Italian radio presenter and actor.

== Biography ==
Mantovani was born in Milan on 27 October 1967. He was known across Italy for his voice acting and his radio presenting.

Mantovani was a personality on numerous prominent stations such as RTL 102.5, Virgin Radio, Radio Capital, and Radio Studio Più. On television, he played the role of journalist Sandro Colussi in the soap opera Vivere. As a voice actor, he lent his voice to characters in animated series, including Casey Jones in Teenage Mutant Ninja Turtles.

He was also a stage actor for Massimo Navone's theatre company Shakespeare & C. with which he took part in several shows. In 2012 he started working for the Mediaset Group. There he voiced several commercials, such as Adidas, Purina, Oral B, Kinder and Ferrero Rocher.

Mantovani died on 2 January 2025, aged 57. He was found dead at his home in Palma de Mallorca.
