= Anna Rusticano =

Italian singer (1954–2025)

- Born: 5 November 1954; Florence, Italy
- Died: 15 December 2025 (aged 71) Rome, Italy
- Genres: Pop rock
- Instrument: Vocals
- Years active: 1972–1995 (recording until 1988)
- Labels: Joker, Fonit Cetra, Fontana Records, Silver Records, Supraphon

Anna Rusticano (5 November 1954 – 15 December 2025) was an Italian singer who had a career across three decades. Her music was most popular in the late 1970s and early 1980s.

== Life and career ==
Rusticano moved to Bologna in the early 1970s to perfect her vocal timbre, and began to participate in some singing competitions, until she was noticed by Walter Guertler who signed her to the Joker record company, giving her the opportunity to debut in 1972 with her first 45 rpm Con la testa piena di sogni (with the lyrics written by Giorgio Calabrese and the music by Gino Mescoli) which however was not successful, like the subsequent La maniera di richiedente of the same year, again written by Mescoli for the musical part (but by Vito Pallavicini for the lyrics).

The following year, she signed a contract with Fonit Cetra and recorded a new 45 rpm, Sola, which achieved good radio success, like the subsequent Lui lu lui in 1977.

The following year the artist made a name for herself with a song that was censored by Rai (but not by private radio stations), Fallo (with lyrics by Andrea Lo Vecchio and music by Shel Shapiro), and was forced to promote the B-side Certo several times; the album still managed to enter the charts and remained there for seven weeks.

Her first major success came in 1979 with a popular single, again written by Shel Shapiro, Tutto è musica, which entered the charts and remained there for 21 weeks. In February 1979, the song had been proposed for participation in the Sanremo Festival but failed to pass the preliminary selections.

Another good placing came in 1980 with the new 45 rpm Sto con te (23 weeks in the hit parade), which achieved even more success in Germany, where the artist held several concerts in those years; the lyrics of the song are by Valerio Negrini, lyricist of the band Pooh.

Only in 1983, having obtained a new contract with Ricordi, she returned to the scene with yet another single, Strano, a song composed by Adelmo Musso and Claudio Scotti Galletta (bassist of the band Armonium) initially intended for the Sanremo Festival of that year but replaced at the last minute by the song Il mio treno (a song composed by Claudio Natili, Fabio Anfuso, Silvio Aloisio with lyrics by Giancarlo Nisi and Silvio Subelli) already in the repertoire of her colleague Gloriana. It is no coincidence that the release of the album was postponed until late spring, but the poor promotion and distribution did not allow her, at least in Italy, to return to success, unlike what happened again in Germany where the song achieved good sales, in Europe the overall figure of copies sold was one million three hundred thousand with the same song the artist won the Prague Festival.

She later started to write her own songs and becoming a singer-songwriter, releasing her first album in 1986, entitled Protagonista (changing her surname to Rustikano with a "k" for the occasion), where the only non-her own song was a cover of Poster (the famous song written by Claudio Baglioni and Antonio Coggio); in Italy the response was poor, but in Germany, Poland, Czechoslovakia and Hungary it achieved decent sales, allowing her to hold a series of concerts.

In 1988, her second album, Prendimi con te, was released. It was produced by Carlo Pennisi and featured many well-known jazz musicians, such as Maurizio Giammarco and Agostino Marangolo. Unlike in the countries mentioned above, it went largely unnoticed in Italy. Despite this, the singer performed numerous concerts, especially in Eastern European countries, where she achieved considerable success. In Czechoslovakia, and especially in Prague, Rusticano also performed on many local television stations, and the album sold very well.

In the following years, Rusticano moved to Switzerland for a time, where she hosted numerous piano bar evenings in very refined venues. In Italy, she devoted herself to hosting various radio programs, withdrawing from the challenging recording industry. Unfortunately, in 1993, her husband suddenly passed away, prompting her to consider giving up her career altogether, performing only sporadically at local concerts.

She later lived in Tuscany and had not practiced as an artist for years. Rusticano later opened a YouTube channel, Rustanna, which uploaded all the covers she recorded during live sessions.

Rusticano died of complications from pneumonia in Rome, on 15 December 2025, at the age of 71.

== Discography ==
=== 33 rpm ===
- 1986 – Anna Rustikano (Silver Records, LC 10001)
- 1988 – Prendimi con te (Silver Records, SR 34701)
- 2021 – A chi la do... La compilation - Volume 4 (Siglandia, SGL 2CD 026), con il brano Sto con te

=== 45 rpm ===
- 1972 – Con la testa piena di sogni/Mi sveglierò (Joker, M-7133)
- 1973 – La maniera di convincere/Sincero o no (Joker, M-7146)
- 1976 – Sola/Che ne sai del nostro amore (Fonit Cetra, SP 1627)
- 1977 – Lui lu lui/La nostra canzone (Fonit Cetra, SP 1655)
- 1978 – Fallo/Certo (Fontana Records, 6026 034)
- 1979 – Tutto è musica/Fase tre (Fontana Records, 6026 038)
- 1980 – Sto con te/Mi sveglio e mi rivoglio (Fontana Records, 6025 255)
- 1983 – Strano/Basta (Dischi Ricordi, SRL 10992)
- 1988 – Mi manchi/Vorrei (Supraphon, 11 0152-7311), pubblicato nella Repubblica Cecoslovacchia
