= Sergio Pollastrelli =

Italian politician (1934–2025)

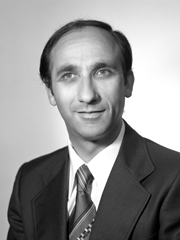
Sergio Pollastrelli

Sergio Pollastrelli (26 November 1934 – 17 August 2025) was an Italian politician.

== Life and career ==
Pollastrelli was born in Viterbo on 26 November 1934. He was a Municipal councilor in Viterbo and member of the board of the Cassa di Risparmio di Viterbo Foundation, he was elected senator of the Republic for three legislatures (VII, VIII and IX) with the PCI.

Pollastrelli died on 17 August 2025, at the age of 90.
