= 1945 in Italy =

- Decades: 1920s; 1930s; 1940s; 1950s; 1960s
- See also: History of Italy; Timeline of Italian history; List of years in Italy

Events from the year 1945 in Italy.

== Incumbents ==
- King of Italy – Victor Emmanuel III
- Regent – Umberto
- Prime Minister – Ivanoe Bonomi (until 19 June), vacant (until 21 June), Ferruccio Parri (until 10 December), then Alcide De Gasperi

== Events ==
- April 6 – May 2 - Spring 1945 offensive in Italy
- April 12–19 - Battle of the Argenta Gap
- April 9–21 - Battle of Bologna
- April 26–29 - Battle of Collecchio

== Deaths ==
- February 23 - Serafino Mazzolini
- April 28 - Benito Mussolini, Clara Petacci, Nicola Bombacci, Alessandro Pavolini and Fernando Mezzasoma
- April 29 - Achille Starace
- July 10 - Guido Buffarini Guidi
- November 19 - Carlo Alberto Biggini

== See also ==
- Italian Campaign (World War II)
- World War II
