= 1944 in Italy =

- Decades: 1920s; 1930s; 1940s; 1950s; 1960s
- See also: History of Italy; Timeline of Italian history; List of years in Italy

Events from the year 1944 in Italy were tumultuous, during which was the heaviest fighting in World War II in Italy.

== Incumbents ==
- King of Italy – Victor Emmanuel III
- Regent – Umberto (from June 5)
- Prime Minister – Pietro Badoglio (until 24 April, "government of experts"; until 18 June, national unity government with the six parties of the CLN), Ivanoe Bonomi (starting 18 June; till December 12, national unity government with the six parties of the CLN; later, national unity government but without PSI and Pd'A.)

Northern Italy was formally ruled by Mussolini’s Italian Social Republic. though real power was held by the German and Allied occupying forces.

From spring to autumn, several free republics were constituted by the Italian partisans (particularly Ossola), but they had all fallen to the Germans and fascists by the end of the year.

== Events ==
- 8 January – Verona trial
- 17 January – Battle of Monte Cassino
- 22 January – Allied landings in Anzio
- 30 January – Battle of Cisterna
- 1 March – General strike in Northern Italy
- 2 March – Balvano train disaster
- 18 March – The Badoglio cabinet is recognized by the Soviet Union and later by the Allied.
- 24 March – Ardeatine massacre
- 3 June – Foundation of the CGIL, bringing together unions of all political orientations.
- 4 June – Liberation of Rome
- 9 June – Creation of the Corps of Freedom Volunteers, military organization of the Italian resistance.
- 16 June - Battle of Ancona
- 12 August – Sant'Anna di Stazzema massacre
- 22 August – Florence is liberated by the Italian partisans and by the Allied army.
- 25 August – The Gothic Line offensive begins.
- 4 September – Battle of Gemmano
- 29 September – Marzabotto massacre
- 13 November – In a radio proclamation, Harold Alexander announces the end of the Allied offensive and asks the Italian partisans to suspend military operations.
- 26 December – Battle of Garfagnana
- 28 December – the CLNAI (National Liberation Committee for Northern Italy) is acknowledged as representative of the Italian government in the occupied territories.

== Literature and culture ==
- L'Adalgisa (Carlo Emilio Gadda)
- Kaputt (Curzio Malaparte)
- Il quartiere (Vasco Pratolini)
- Il marito in collegio (Giovannino Guareschi)
- Ascolto il tuo cuore, città (Alberto Savinio)

In the freed Italy, the first cultural magazines inspired to the antifascist beliefs appear : Aretusa, Mercurio, La nuova Europa and Rinascita (official review of the PCI). In Florence, Italia e Civiltà, voice of the more moderate fascist wing, goes out for a few months.

== Cinema ==
In spite of the war situation, a large number of new Italian movies, generally realized before the armistice, goes out in cinemas, (Sorelle Materassi, by Poggioli; The innkeeper, by Chiarini; La donna della montagna, by Castellani). A limited film production goes on North Italy. Vivere ancora, began by Leo Longanesi in Rome the last year, is completed in Turin by Francesco de Robertis. In Venice, the authorities of the Italian Social Republic try to establish a new Cinecittà, called Cinevillaggio but the studios realize only a dozen of movies, of poor artistic value. In Rome, Vittorio De Sica directs The gates of heaven, produced by the Vatican. The processing of the movie, protracted for seven months, allows many antifascists, as De Sica himself, to wait in relative tranquility for the liberation of the city.

== Births ==
- 5 January – Franco Ferrini, screenwriter
- 6 April – Anita Pallenberg, film actress and model (d. 2017)
- 6 May – Rainer Masera, politician
- 21 June – Franco Cordova, footballer
- 24 September – Enzo Sciotti, artist and illustrator (d. 2021)
- 7 November – Gigi Riva, footballer (d. 2024)

== Deaths ==
- 11 January (executed by firing squad):
  - Emilio De Bono, military leader, 77
  - Galeazzo Ciano, politician, 40
  - Giovanni Marinelli, politician, 64
- 24 March:
  - Aldo Finzi, politician (executed), 52
  - Pietro Pappagallo, Catholic priest and anti-fascist (executed), 55
- 27 March – Eduino Francini, partisan, 18 (killed in action)
- 22 September – Pietro Caruso
- 13 October – Don Giovanni Fornasini, Gold Medal of Military Valour, Servant of God, murdered at Marzabotto by a Waffen SS soldier

== See also ==
- Italian Campaign (World War II)
