= Angie Von Pritt =

Spanish vedette (1953–c. 1980s)

- Born: December 19, 1953; Vinaroz, Castellón, Spain
- Died: Valencia, Spain

Angie Von Pritt (December 19, 1953 – between 1987 & 1992) was a Spanish vedette.

== Biography ==
Angie Von Pritt was born in Vinaroz, Castellón. She accompanied her father when he migrated to Canada to work. Upon returning to Spain and before her transition, Von Pritt served her compulsory military service, but it only lasted 15 days. During the conscription she was given a military cut, which she dyed blonde and let grow. This earned her comparisons to Bárbara Rey, which gave her an initial claim to fame.

In the early 1970s, she began her artistic career, with a secondary role in the play Charly, no te vayas a Sodoma by Luis Portoles. At the same time, she worked as a waitress in some LGBTQ bars, where she took the name of Angie. By 1977 she began to appear in erotic magazines such as Lib, Party and Papillón, which exploited her resemblance to Bárbara Rey, one of the most famous vedettes at the moment.

Von Pritt continued working in the entertainment world, with the company Incógnito. She premiered the show New Crazy Horse Gay, together with the master of ceremonies Pierrot, with whom she toured rooms such as Rialto in Barcelona and the Morocco of Madrid. By that time, she was known as "la doble de Bárbara Rey" ("the double of Bárbara Rey"). After the dissolution of the company, Von Pritt was hired in 1980 by the company of music magazines of Addy Ventura, with whom she premiered at the Apolo Theater in Barcelona.

In 1983, she moved to Seville, where she performed in the Music Hall Vista Alegre, and in other cabarets, combining her activities in the artistic world with prostitution. She participated in the television documentary Noche de travestis, broadcast by Televisión Española on 5 February 1984.

Her health eventually deteriorated due to her heroin addiction. She continued working in the Andalusian capital, in cafes like Tercer Tiempo. She died with a health condition deteriorated by AIDS in Valencia some time between 1987 and 1992.
