= Franco Vaccari =

Italian artist (1936–2025)

Franco Vaccari (18 June 1936 – 12 December 2025) was an Italian visual artist and photographer.

== Life and career ==
Vaccari was born in Modena on 18 June 1936. He specialised in conceptual art, using photography and videography with a focus on the public.

His notable works include Maschere (1969) and Leave on these walls the photographic trace of your passage (1972).

Vaccari died on 12 December 2025, at the age of 89.
