= 1940 in Italy =

- Decades: 1920s; 1930s; 1940s; 1950s; 1960s
- See also: History of Italy; Timeline of Italian history; List of years in Italy

Events from the year 1940 in Italy.

== Incumbents ==
- King – Victor Emmanuel III
- Prime Minister – Benito Mussolini

== Events ==
- 18 March – In a meeting with Adolf Hitler at the Brenner Pass, Benito Mussolini undertakes to bring Italy into World War II.
- 10 June – Count Ciano, the Minister of Foreign Affairs of Italy, relays Italy's declaration of war to André François-Poncet, the French Ambassador to Italy, declaring war on both the United Kingdom and France. This begins Italy's participation in World War II.
- 28 October – Italy declares war on Greece, starting the Greco-Italian War, a theater of World War II.

=== Literature and culture ===
- 16 March – Bernardo Bertolucci, Italian writer and film director
- 31 July – Fleur Jaeggy, Swiss-Italian fiction writer

== Births ==
- 3 January – Leo de Berardinis, Italian stage actor, theatre director (d. 2008)
- 19 January – Paolo Borsellino, judge and magistrate (d. 1992)
- 17 April – Ira von Fürstenberg, socialite and actress (d. 2024)
- 26 April – Giorgio Moroder, composer
- 24 June
  - Augusto Fantozzi, lawyer, tax expert, academic, businessman and politician (d. 2019)
  - Vittorio Storaro, cinematographer
- 16 October – Ivan Della Mea, singer-songwriter (d. 2009)
- 24 October – Giacomo Bulgarelli, Italian association football player (d. 2009)
- 2 November – Gigi Proietti, actor, singer, and comedian (d. 2020)
- 26 November
  - Enrico Bombieri, mathematician
  - Gianni De Michelis, politician (d. 2019)
- 5 December – Paolo Pillitteri, politician (d. 2024)
- 18 December – Ilario Castagner, football player and manager (d. 2023)
- 30 December – Sergio Doplicher, mathematical physicist (d. 2025)

== Deaths ==
- 28 April – Luisa Tetrazzini, Italian opera singer (b. 1871)
- 28 June – Italo Balbo, Italian Fascist leader (b. 1896)
- 10 July – Pietro Frugoni, Italian general (b. 1851)

== See also ==
- Italian Campaign (World War II)
