= Palazzo Tarasconi, Parma =

Coordinates: 44.79860°N 10.32710°E

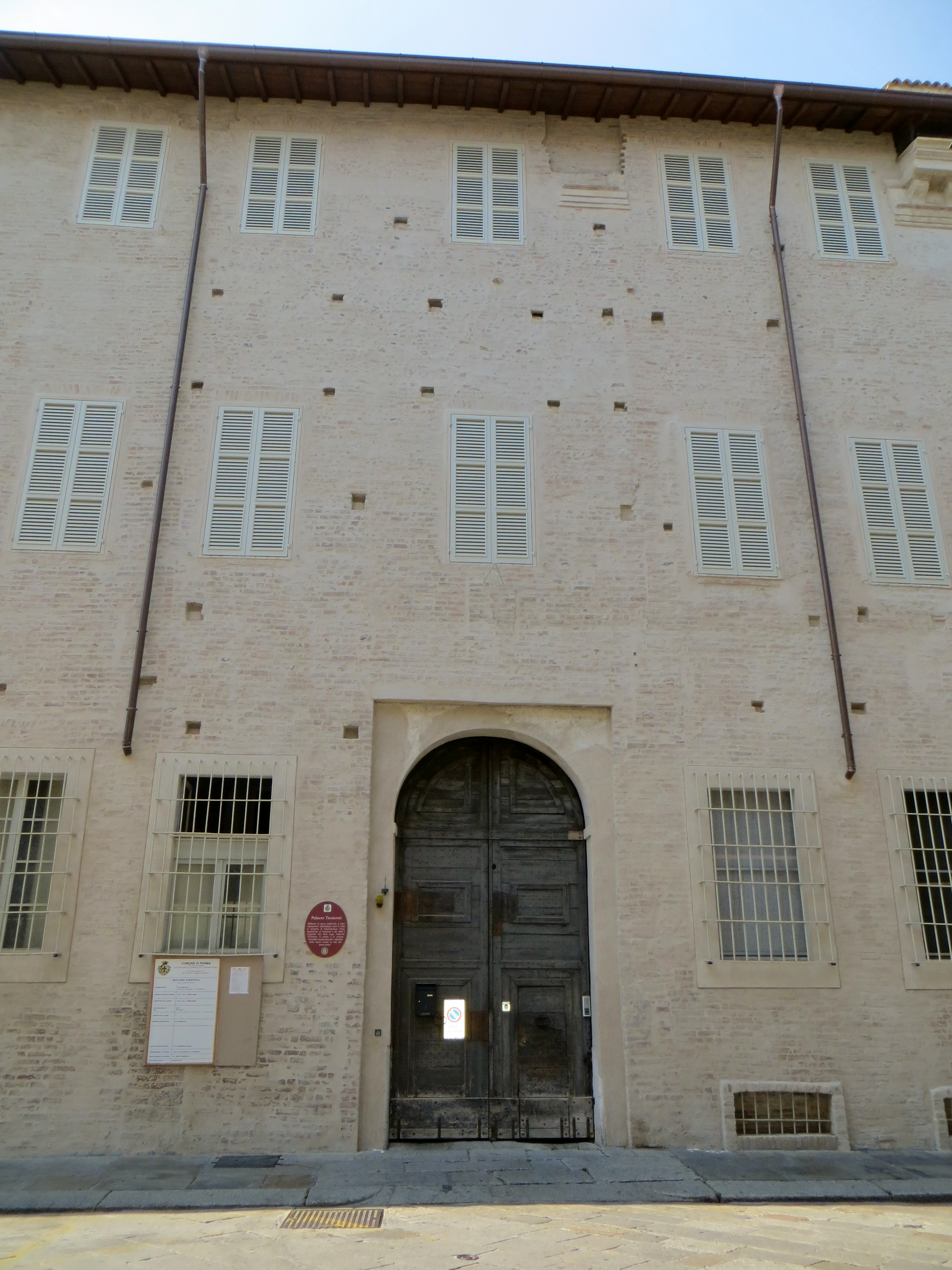

The Palazzo Tarasconi, also known as Palazzo Soragna Tarasconi, is a Renaissance-style aristocratic palace located on Strada Luigi Carlo Farini #37 in the historical centre of Parma, Italy.

== History and description ==
The palace was built atop the foundations of medieval structures, commissioned in the late 16th century by brothers Scipione and Alessandro Tarasconi, and likely designed by Giovanni Francesco Testa, although some work may have been modified or completed by Giovanni Battista Magnani.

The brick facade we see today was left unfinished in 16th century. In 1858, it was inherited by marchese Luigi Lupo Meli Lupi di Soragna. Presently owned by Corrado Galloni, the palace hosts contemporary art exhibitions and cultural events.

The palace is notable for the Renaissance-era frescoes in the entrance stairs and in the piano nobile. Some are attributed to Cesare Baglione or some of his followers Girolamo Curti, Angelo Michele Colonna, and Giovanni Maria Conti della Camera.
