= British forces in Afghanistan =

British forces in Afghanistan may refer to:

- British army interventions, within the larger scope of Afghanistan–United Kingdom relations during the 19th and 20th centuries
- British combat forces of Operation Veritas (2001 – 2002), and Operation Herrick (2002 – 2014)
- British training forces of Operation Toral (2015 – 2021)
- Operation Pitting, in August 2021.
