= Monte Faito =

Mountain in Italy

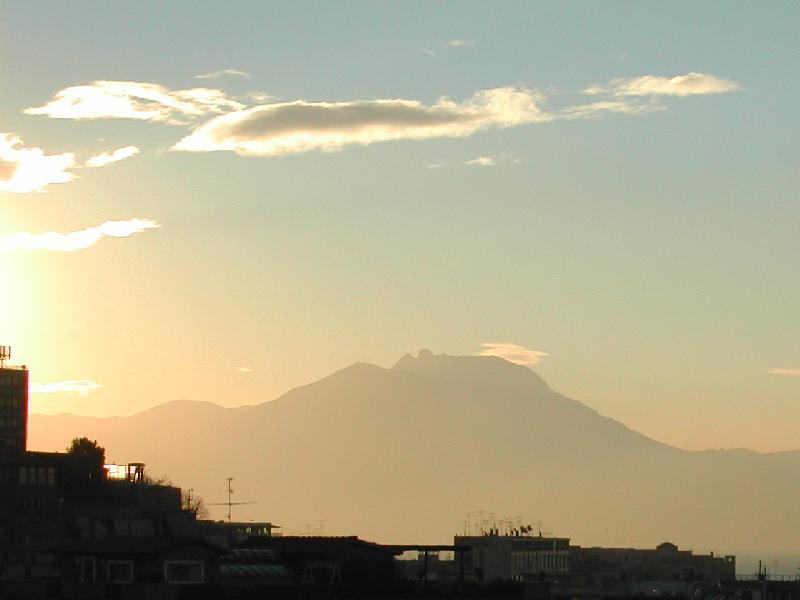
- Monte Faito seen from Naples at dawn.

Highest point
- Elevation: 1,131 m (3,711 ft)
- Coordinates: 40°38′46″N 14°30′49″E

Geography
- Location within Italy
- Location: Campania, Italy
- Parent range: Monti Lattari

Monte Faito is a mountain in the Monti Lattari, a small mountain range chain in the Campanian Pre-Apennines, on the Sorrentine Peninsula of southwestern Italy.

== Geography ==
The summit has an elevation of 1,131 metres (3,711 ft).

The mountain is mostly composed of limestone rocks, and has steep walls directly plunging into the sea at the Gulf of Salerno.

The name derives from the local dialect faggeto, referring to the great numbers of beeches in the mountain area.

== Access ==
Monte Faito can be reached via the Faito aerial tramway from Castellammare di Stabia. Two fatal accidents occurred during the cable car's operating history: the first in 1960 and the second in 2025 both killing four.

Other communes nearby include Vico Equense and Cava de' Tirreni.
