= Marco Onado =

Italian economist (1941–2025)

Marco Onado (19 April 1941 – 1 July 2025) was an Italian economist.

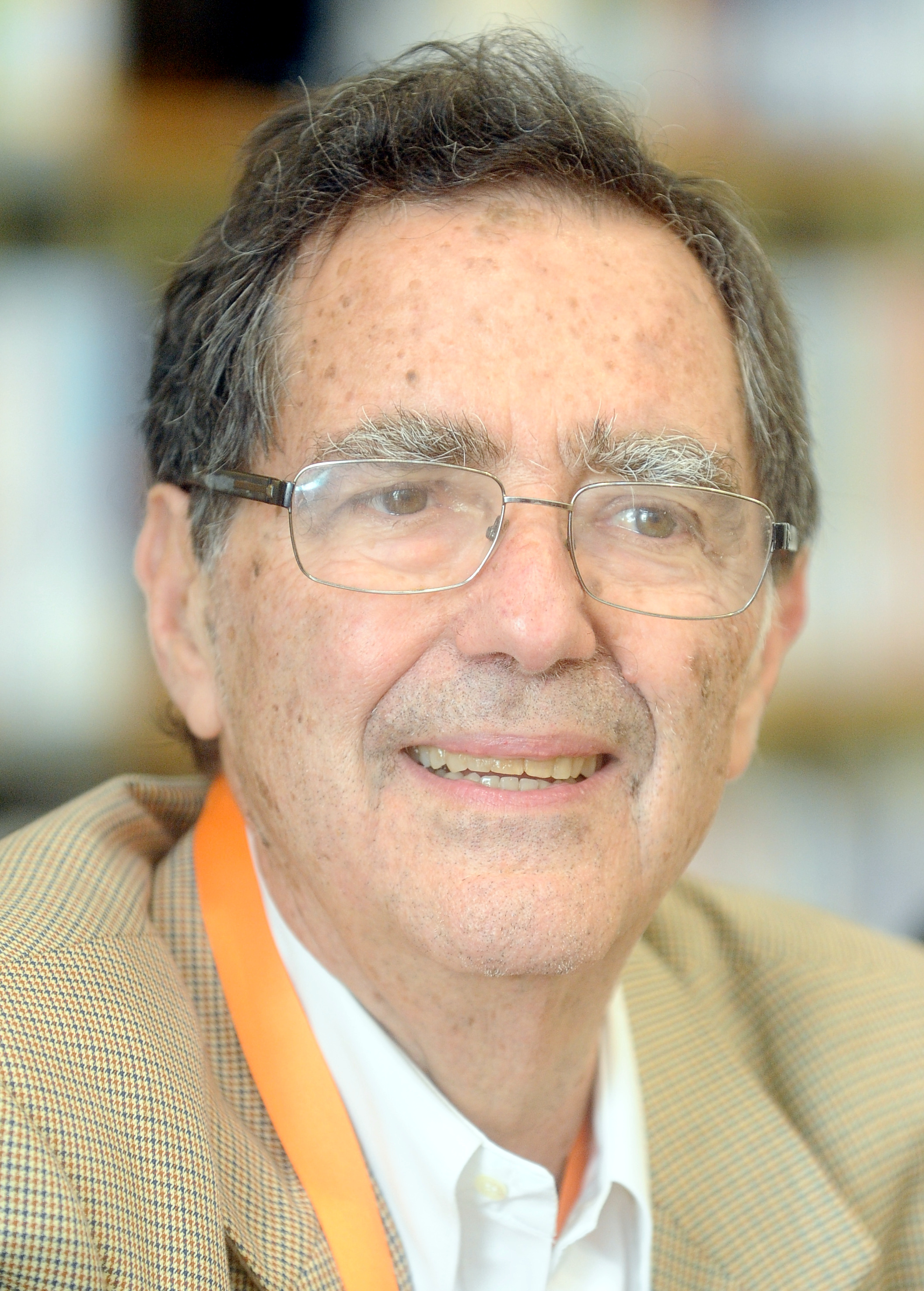
Onado in 2018

== Life and career ==
Onado was born in Milan on 19 April 1941. He graduated in Economics and Business from Bocconi University, where he then taught until his death. He was also Full Professor of Economics of Financial Intermediaries at the Universities of Modena and Reggio Emilia and Bologna and Visiting Professor at the University College of North Wales and Brown University.

He was a member of the Scientific Committee of Prometeia Association, Consob, Ente per gli studi monetari bancari e credito "Luigi Einaudi" and of the magazines Banca Impresa e Società e Mercato Concorrenza Regole.

Onado died in Milan on 1 July 2025, at the age of 84. The funeral was held two days later in the church of San Marco. He was subsequently cremated at the cemetery of Lambrate and the ashes were finally buried in the family tomb at the major cemetery of Milan.
