= Mohammad Hannoun =

Palestinian architect

Mohamed Hannoun is the president of the Palestinian Association in Italy. He was 63 years old in 2025, a Genoa resident, and has worked as an architect. In addition to being Palestinian, he has Jordanian citizenship, but has been living in Italy for 40 years. The United States and Italian governments have both accused Hannoun of being a financier of Hamas.

== Gaza Flotillas ==
=== 2010 Gaza Freedom Flotilla ===
Mohamed Hannoun and his charity, the Palestinian Association in Italy, worked with the Turkish nonprofit IHH to fund the 2010 Gaza Freedom Flotilla (also known as the Freedom Flotilla 2).

=== Global Sumud Flotilla ===
Hannoun supported the 2025 Global Sumud Flotilla, which had boats set sail for Gaza from Genoa. Hannoun was also a participant in the November 2025 pro-Palestine protests alongside Global Sumud Flotilla participant Greta Thunberg.

== 2024 Sanremo Music Festival ==
At the 2024 Sanremo Music Festival, an on-stage plea by one of the performers, Italian-Tunisian rapper Ghali, sparked controversy after the rapper pled on stage to “stop the genocide” in (Gaza). Mohammed Hannoun thanked Ghali for “his clear words against the extermination"; Ghali's remarks were condemned by the Israeli ambassador to Italy.

== United States and Italian sanctions ==
In 2000, Hannoun was investigated by the Italian government, but the investigation was closed without action. In 2023, the United States Treasury Department placed Hannoun and his nonprofit, the Palestinian Association in Italy, on a travel black list, accusing the nonprofit and by extension Hannoun of being financiers of terrorism. In October 2024, the U.S. Department of the Treasury announced sanctions against several Italian charities and individuals, including Hannoun.

In November 2024, the government of Milan barred Hannoun from entering the city for several months due to comments he made praising the November 2024 Amsterdam riots. A year later, Hannoun received a second travel ban from Milan for making statements interpreted as supportive of violence against Palestinians accused of collaboration.

== 2025 December arrest ==
Hannoun was arrested on December 27, 2025, with eight others on charges of financing Hamas. According to authorities, the defendants had sent millions of euros directly to Hamas members or to organizations banned by Israel due to their links to Hamas. The Italian government put out a statement the next day announcing the arrests by the anti-mafia and anti-terrorism units. The authorities stated that they decided to arrest Hannoun because he had removed evidence from his phone and was in the process of relocating to Turkey. They also referred to Hannoun as the leader of Hamas in Italy.

Hannoun's lawyers have said that "the charges against our client were fabricated by Israel". Hannoun has stated that allegations of his being a leader of Hamas are hoaxes, and has said that he is as sympathetic to Hamas as any faction fighting on behalf of his rights as a Palestinian. The charges were criticized in CounterPunch as an attempt to criminalize sending aid to Gaza and suppress pro-Palestine solidarity in Italy.

In January 2026, three of Hannoun's co-defendants were released. In April 2026, the Supreme Court of Cassation upheld the decision to release them and ordered the Court of Review to decide whether to release the remaining defendants. The Court also decided that evidence submitted by Israel was inadmissible.

== Personal life ==
Mohammad Hannoun has a wife and two children.
