= Enea Piccinelli =

Italian politician (1927–2025)

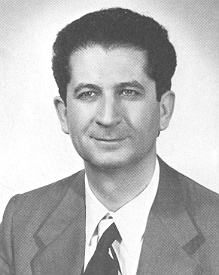

Member of the Chamber of Deputies
- In office 1963–1983

Undersecretary of State for Labour and Social Security
- In office 28 March 1979 – 3 August 1979

Personal details
- Born: 9 October 1927 Piancastagnaio, Province of Siena, Kingdom of Italy
- Died: 30 October 2025 (aged 98) Piancastagnaio, Tuscany, Italy
- Party: Christian Democracy
- Occupation: Lawyer

Enea Piccinelli (9 October 1927 – 30 October 2025) was an Italian lawyer and politician who served as a Deputy (1963–1983) and Undersecretary of State in the Fifth Andreotti government. Piccinelli died on 30 October 2025, at the age of 98.
