= Monte Faito cable car crash =

2025 cable car crash near Naples, Italy

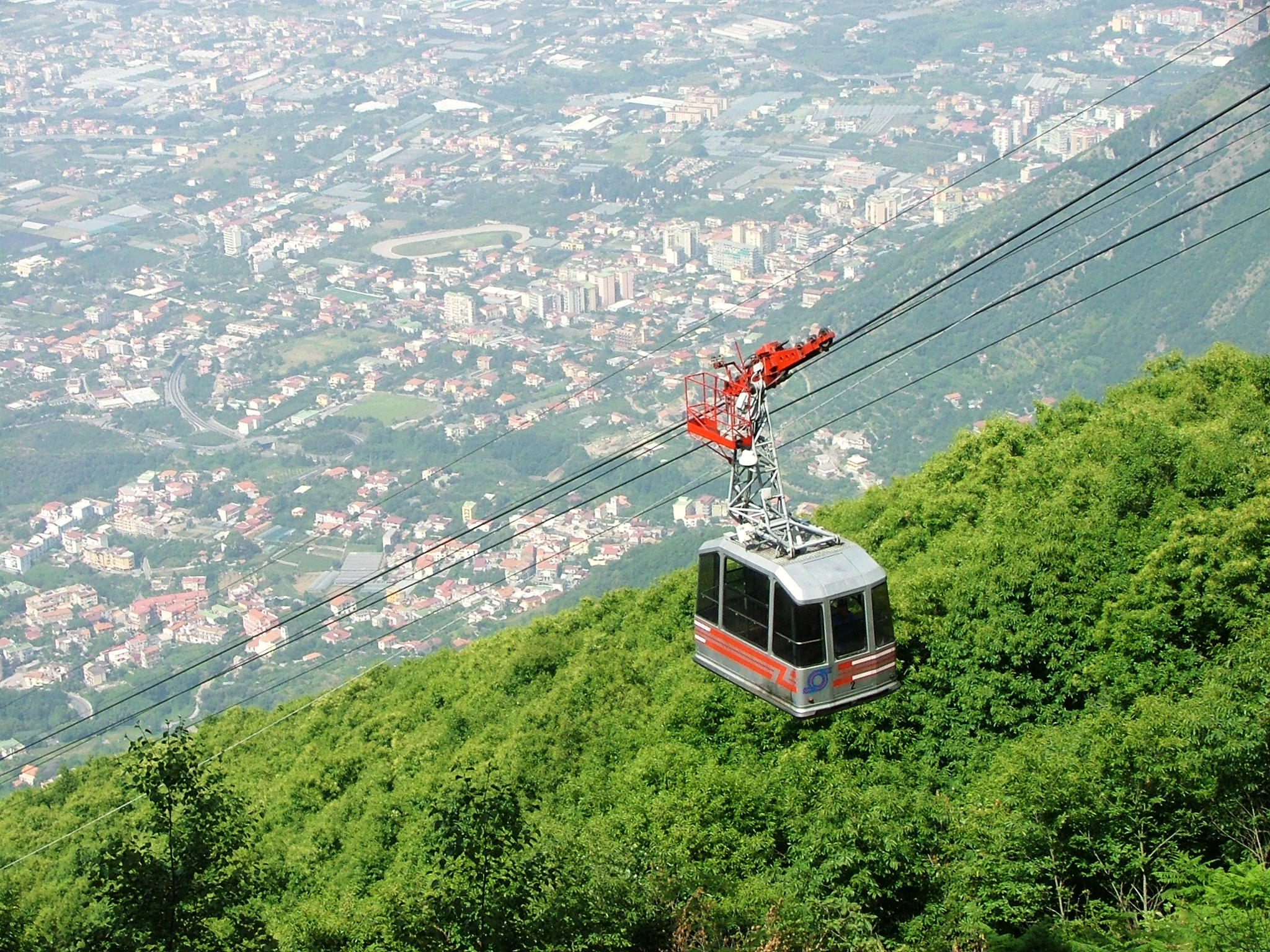
- A Monte Faito cable car in 2007
- Date: 17 April 2025
- Location: Monte Faito near Castellammare di Stabia, Campania, Italy
- Deaths: 4
- Injuries: 1

On 17 April 2025, a cable car at Monte Faito near Castellammare di Stabia, Campania, Italy, crashed, resulting in the deaths of four people and serious injuries to one other. The incident occurred when the hauling cable snapped during descent, causing the cabin to fall. A second cabin stayed on the track cable and was successfully evacuated. The crash took place shortly after the seasonal reopening of the cable car service. Investigations into the cause of the crash are ongoing.

== Background ==
The Monte Faito cable car connects the town of Castellammare di Stabia with the summit of Monte Faito, a tourist destination near the Bay of Naples. The cable car, which averages around 110,000 visitors each year, had resumed operation for the 2025 spring season three weeks earlier on 25 March after routine winter maintenance. The cableway is managed by the regional transport company Ente Autonomo Volturno (EAV).

== Accident ==
The cabin was descending Monte Faito in the town of Castellammare di Stabia when a traction cable broke, causing it to suddenly plunge into a ravine after stopping very close to the station at the top of the peak, at around 1,050-metre (3,440 ft).

Four of the five passengers in the affected cabin died at the scene, and the fifth suffered life-threatening injuries and was airlifted to a hospital in Naples. Emergency responders, including alpine rescue teams, police, civil protection personnel and more than 50 firefighters, arrived at the scene and worked into the evening in severe weather conditions, with fog and strong winds making rescue operations difficult. Due to the conditions the rescuer needed more than 90 minutes to reach the cabin. A second cabin carrying 16 passengers, which had become stranded right after leaving the bottom station, was safely evacuated by rescue personnel. Tourists on board were uninjured but treated for shock.

== Victims ==
The four deceased victims were identified as three tourists, a husband and wife from Britain and an Arab-Israeli woman, as well as the Italian cable car driver. The injured victim was the brother of the Arab-Israeli woman.

== Reactions ==
Italy’s President of the Senate expressed condolences to the families of the victims. Italy’s transport minister called the accident “a grave tragedy” and pledged transparency in the investigation. Prime minister Giorgia Meloni who was on a trip to Washington also expressed sincere condolences through her office. Prosecutors in Torre Annunziata, having judicial oversight over Castellammare di Stabia, have opened an investigation into possible manslaughter, which will involve an inspection of the cable stations, the pylons, the two cabins and the cable.

== See also ==
- Stresa–Mottarone cable car crash
