= Fulco Pratesi =

Italian politician (1934–2025)

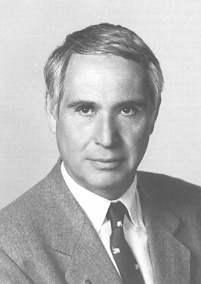

Member of the Chamber of Deputies
- In office 23 April 1992 – 14 April 1994
- Constituency: Turin

Personal details
- Born: 6 September 1934 Rome, Italy
- Died: 1 March 2025 (aged 90) Rome, Italy
- Party: Federation of the Greens
- Education: Sapienza University of Rome
- Occupation: Journalist

Fulco Pratesi (6 September 1934 – 1 March 2025) was an Italian environmentalist, journalist and politician who founded the World Wide Fund for Nature in Italy in 1966, and served as a Deputy in the nineties.

== Life and career ==
Born in Rome on 6 September 1934, Pratesi was the author of many books about wildlife, often illustrated by himself, worked with Italian newspapers like Corriere della Sera, and was for some time president of the Italian Abruzzo, Lazio and Molise National Park. He was married with four children. Pratesi died in Rome on 1 March 2025, at the age of 90.
