= 1919 in Italy =

- Decades: 1890s; 1900s; 1910s; 1920s; 1930s
- See also: History of Italy; Timeline of Italian history; List of years in Italy

Events from the year 1919 in Italy.

== Kingdom of Italy ==
- Monarch – Victor Emmanuel III (1900–1946)
- Prime Minister –
  1. Vittorio Emanuele Orlando (1917–1919)
  2. Francesco Saverio Nitti (1919–1920)
- Population – 35,717,000

== Events ==
The years 1919 and 1920 were known as the Biennio Rosso (English: "Red Biennium"): a two-year period of intense social conflict and political unrest in Italy, following the First World War. The revolutionary period and nationalist agitation on the Mutilated victory and the failure to obtain territorial concessions in Dalmatia at the end of World War I to fulfil Italy’s irredentist claims, was followed by the violent reaction of the Fascist blackshirts militia, the most brutal of which were the Cremona squads organized by Roberto Farinacci to terrorize the Italian population into submission to Fascism, and eventually by the March on Rome of Benito Mussolini in 1922.

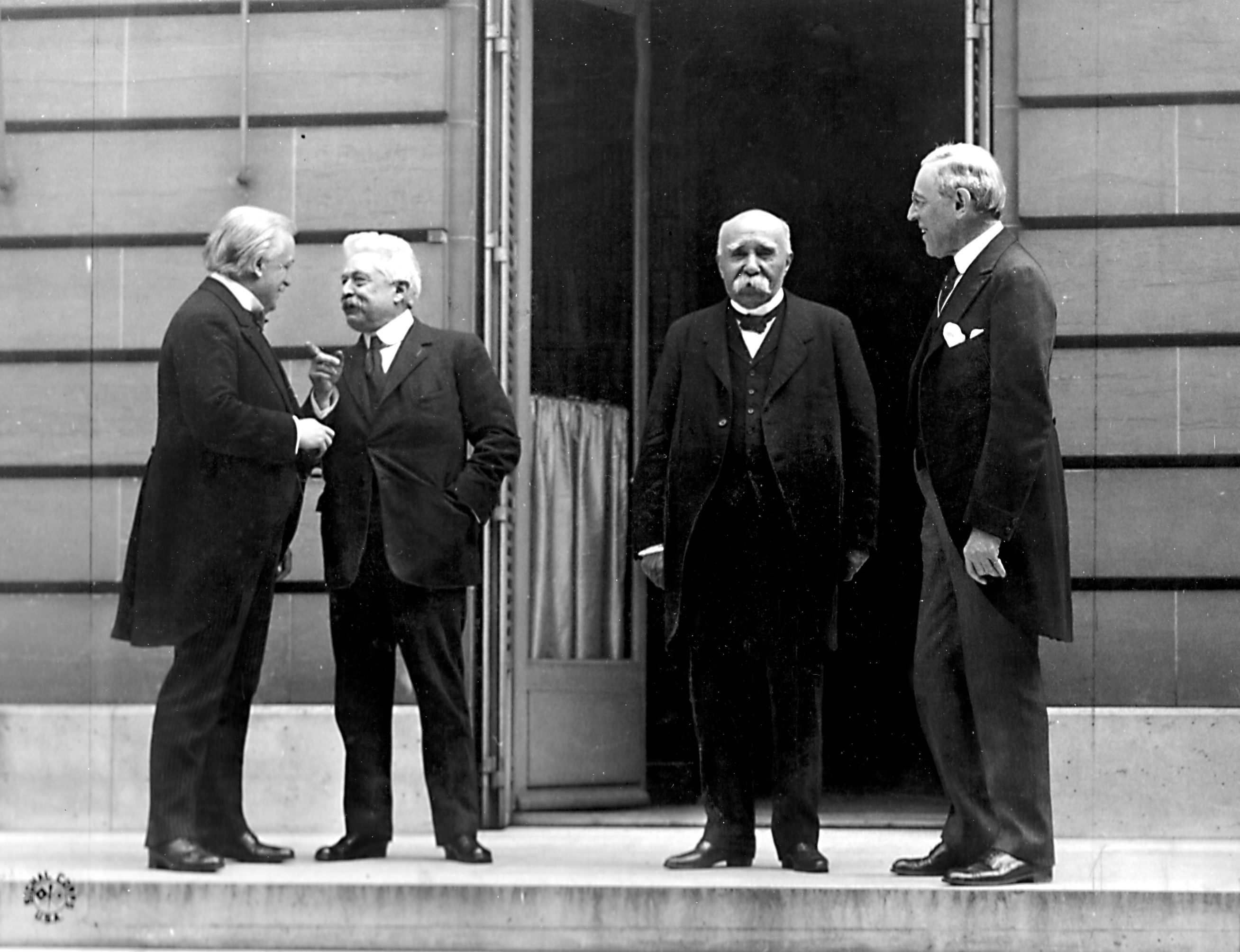
The heads of the "Big Four" nations at the Paris Peace Conference, 27 May 1919. From left to right: David Lloyd George, Vittorio Orlando, Georges Clemenceau, and Woodrow Wilson.

=== January ===
- January 18 – The Paris Peace Conference opens. Prime Minister Vittorio Emanuele Orlando is one of the Big Four, the main Allied leaders and participants at the Paris Peace Conference in 1919, along with U.S. President Woodrow Wilson, French Prime Minister Georges Clemenceau and Britain's Prime Minister David Lloyd George.
  The Italian delegation demands the fulfilment of the "secret Treaty of London of 1915, by which the Allies had promised Italy ample territorial compensation in Dalmatia for its entry into World War I." Although, as prime minister, Orlando was the head of the Italian delegation, his inability to speak English and his weak political position at home allowed the conservative Foreign Minister, Sidney Sonnino, to play a dominant role. Their differences proved to be disastrous during the negotiations. Orlando was prepared to renounce territorial claims for Dalmatia to annex Rijeka (or Fiume as the Italians called the town) - the principal seaport on the Adriatic Sea - while Sonnino was not prepared to give up Dalmatia. Italy ended up claiming both and got none, running up against Wilson's policy of national self-determination.
- January 18 – Foundation of the Italian People's Party by Luigi Sturzo, a Sicilian Catholic priest. The PPI was backed by Pope Benedict XV to oppose the Italian Socialist Party (PSI). The party supported various social reforms, including the foundations of a welfare state, women's suffrage and Proportional representation voting.

=== March ===
- Gabrielle D'Annunzio conceives the idea of the Rome–Tokyo Raid while meeting with the Japanese poet and Arditi Harukichi Shimoi.

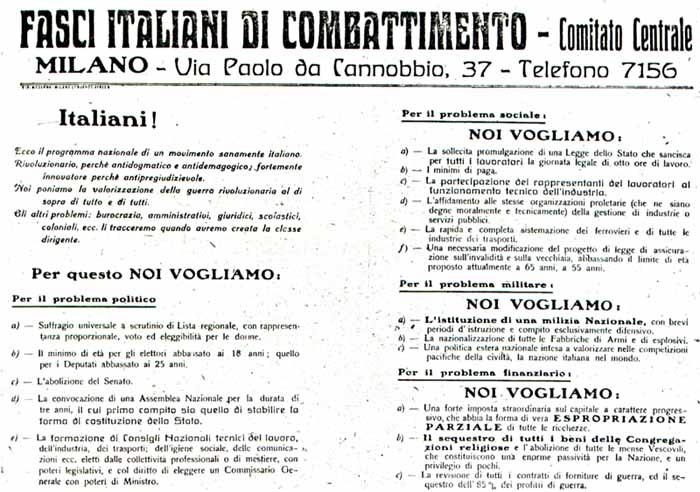
The platform of Fasci italiani di combattimento, as published in "Il Popolo d'Italia" on 6 June 1919.

- March 23 – Benito Mussolini organizes a rally at Piazza San Sepolcro in Milan where he proclaims the principles of Fasci Italiani di Combattimento, and then publishes the Fascist Manifesto in the newspaper he co-founded, "Il Popolo d'Italia", on June 6, 1919.

=== April ===
- April 11 – Italy supports the Racial Equality Proposal introduced by Japan at the Paris Peace Conference.
- April 15 – U.S. President Woodrow Wilson issues a memorandum proposing a line, the so-called "Wilson Line", dividing the Istrian peninsula between Italy and Yugoslavia. Trieste and Pula, with the railway connecting them, lay on the Italian side; Fiume and Ljubljana, with the railway connecting them, on the Yugoslav. Učka (Monte Maggiore) was to be Italian, but the Wilson Line ran further west of Fiume than that of the Treaty of London. Italy would have none of the rights in northern Dalmatia granted it by that treaty, but it would receive the islands of Vis (Lissa) and Lošinj (Lussin).
  After the resignation of Orlando and Sonnino in June, the new Foreign Minister Tommaso Tittoni alters the course of negotiations by abandoning the Treaty of London and strengthening the Franco-Italian alliance, but he did not accept President Wilson's proposed "line". The French diplomat André Tardieu worked as an intermediary between Tittoni and the Americans, and he first suggested the creation of a buffer state out of a strip of land around Fiume, the future Free State of Fiume.
- April 26 – Fiume affair. Faced with the refusal of Wilson, Clemenceau and Lloyd George to assign Fiume to Italy, Orlando abandons the Paris Peace Conference and returns to Rome.

=== May ===
- May 1 – Foundation of L'Ordine Nuovo (Italian for The New Order) in Turin, by a group, including Antonio Gramsci, Angelo Tasca and Palmiro Togliatti, within the Italian Socialist Party. The founders were admirers of the Russian Revolution and strongly supported the immediate creation of soviets in Italy.

=== June ===
- June 19 – Prime Minister Vittorio Emanuele Orlando resigns following his inability to acquire Fiume for Italy in the peace settlement. On June 23, he is succeeded by Francesco Saverio Nitti. His cabinet has to deal with great social unrest and dissatisfaction over the results of the Treaty of Versailles. Particularly troublesome was the agitation over Fiume led by Gabriele D'Annunzio. Nitti had great difficulty keeping the administration functioning at all, thanks to the enmity between the extremely divergent political factions.
- June 28 – The Treaty of Versailles ends the state of war between Germany and the Allied Powers.

=== July ===
- July 4 – Food riots and strikes in Romagna and Bologna spread to other cities like Milan, Genoa, Livorno, Pisa, Florence, Palermo and others, with several people dead. Shopkeepers reduce food prices; sometimes to as much as 50 to 70 per cent.
- July 20–21 – General strike in solidarity with the Russian Revolution is proclaimed, but with little success.

=== September ===
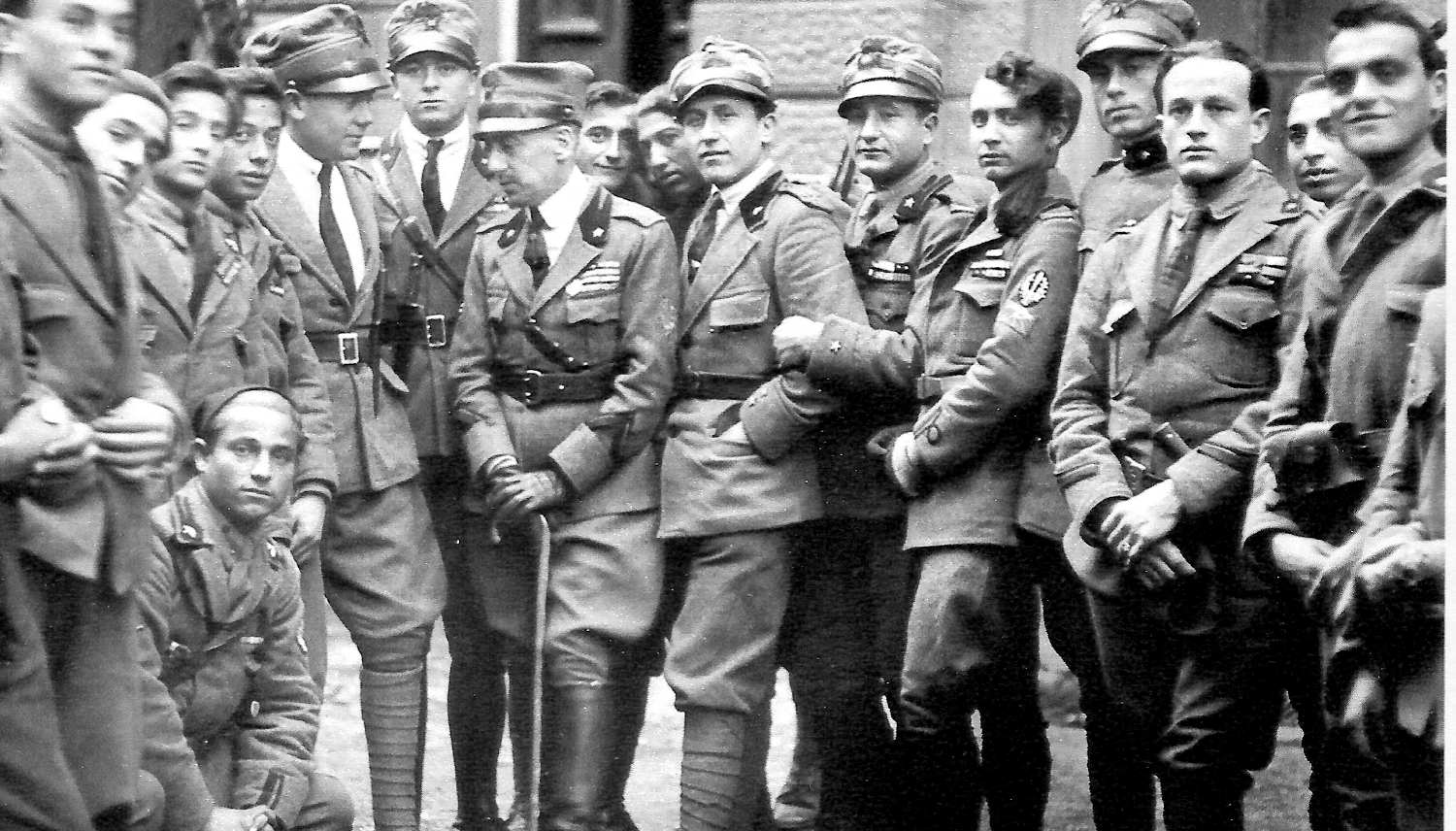
Gabriele D'Annunzio (in the middle with the stick) with some legionaries in Fiume in 1919. To the right of D'Annunzio, facing him, Lt. Arturo Avolio.

- September 10 – The Treaty of Saint-Germain-en-Laye is signed by the victorious Allies of World War I on the one hand and by the Republic of German-Austria on the other. The southern half of the former Tyrolean crownland up to the Brenner Pass, including predominantly German-speaking South Tyrol and the present-day Trentino province, together with the Carinthian Canal Valley around Tarvisio fell to Italy, as well as the Austrian Littoral (Gorizia and Gradisca, the Imperial Free City of Trieste and the March of Istria) and several Dalmatian islands, as stipulated by the 1915 Treaty of London. The main part of the former Kingdom of Dalmatia including Rijeka is ceded to the Yugoslav Kingdom of Serbs, Croats and Slovenes, contrary to what was stipulated by the 1915 Treaty of London.
- September 12 – The nationalist poet Gabriele D’Annunzio leads 2,600 Italian irredentist troops against a mixed force of Allied soldiers to occupy the city of Fiume. The march to Fiume became known as the Impresa di Fiume ("Fiume Exploit"). D'Annunzio announces that he had annexed the territory to the Kingdom of Italy. He was enthusiastically welcomed by the Italian population of Fiume. The move was opposed by the Italian government, and D'Annunzio tried to resist pressure from Italy. The plotters sought to have Italy annex Fiume, but this was denied. Instead, Italy initiated a blockade of Fiume while demanding that the plotters surrender. The victors establish the Italian Regency of Carnaro, an unrecognized state based on the proto-fascist Charter of Carnaro.
- September 29 – The Italian parliament is dissolved after Foreign Minister Tittoni withdraws and fights erupt in the Chamber of Deputies during the debate about the annexation of Fiume, opposed by Prime Minister Nitti. Elections are set for November 16. For the first time, Catholics are allowed to vote on their own candidates of the Italian People's Party.

=== October ===
- Election campaign amidst rising food prices and coal shortages.
- October 24 – D'Annunzio publishes an editorial in the Corriere della Sera in which he coined the term Mutilated victory (Italian: vittoria mutilata) referring to the broken Treaty of London of 1915. The broken treaty fueled the rhetoric of irredentists and nationalists in Italian politics.

=== November ===
- November 16 – General elections. The fragmented Liberal governing coalition lost the absolute majority in the Chamber of Deputies, due to the success of the Italian Socialist Party led by Filippo Turati and the Italian People's Party led by Don Luigi Sturzo.

== Births ==
- January 14 – Giulio Andreotti, Italian politician and Prime Minister (d. 2013)
- January 26 – Valentino Mazzola, Italian footballer (d. 1949)
- July 31 – Primo Levi, Italian Jewish chemist, writer, and Holocaust survivor (d. 1987)
- August 8 – Dino De Laurentiis, Italian film producer (d. 2010)
- October 6 – Alda Grimaldi, Italian director and actress (d. 2023)
- November 1 – Aldo Mongiano, Italian-born Brazilian Roman Catholic bishop (d. 2020)
- November 20 – Rugger Ardizoia, Italian-born American baseball player (d. 2015)

== Deaths ==
- August 9 – Ruggero Leoncavallo, Italian composer (b. 1857)
- September 27 – Adelina Patti, Italian opera singer (b. 1843)
- December 7 – Marianna Paulucci, naturalist (b. 1835)
