= 1920 in Italy =

- Decades: 1900s; 1910s; 1920s; 1930s; 1940s
- See also: History of Italy; Timeline of Italian history; List of years in Italy

Events from the year 1920 in Italy.

== Kingdom of Italy ==
- Monarch – Victor Emmanuel III (1900–1946)
- Prime Minister –
  1. Francesco Saverio Nitti (1919–1920)
  2. Giovanni Giolitti (1920–1921)
- Population – 35,960,000

== Events ==
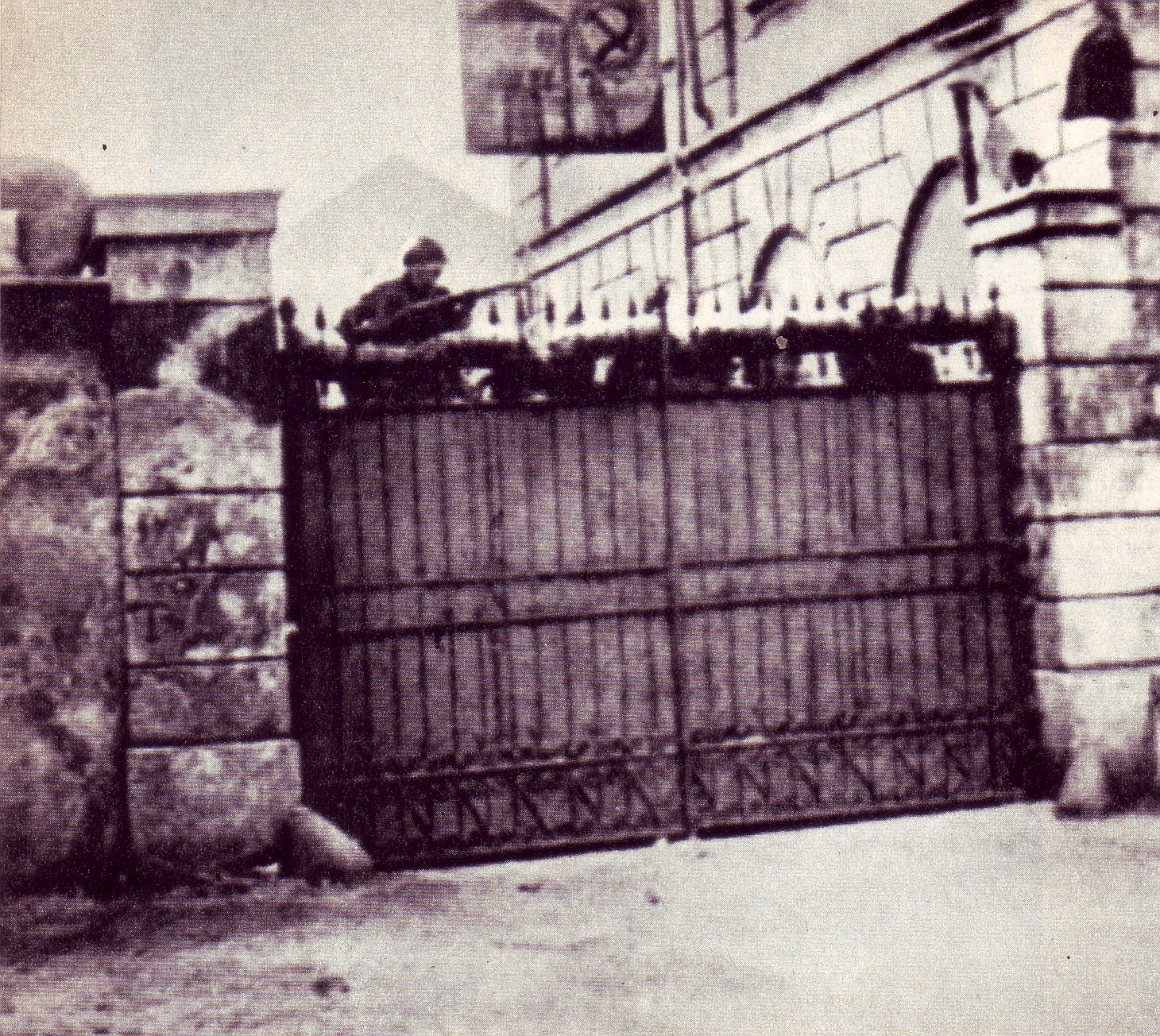
September 1920: armed workers occupy factories in Milan

In 1920, militant strike activity by industrial workers reaches its peak in Italy; 1919 and 1920 were known as the "Red Years". Benito Mussolini and the Fascists take advantage of the situation by allying with industrial businesses and attacking workers and peasants in the name of preserving order and internal peace in Italy.

=== January ===
- January 10 – Italy is among the founding members of the League of Nations. Its primary goals, as stated in its Covenant, included preventing wars through collective security and disarmament and settling international disputes through negotiation and arbitration.
- January 27 – A public rally in the city of Split against Italian imperialism ends in an assault on the offices of some Italian associations and about twenty Italian shops, whose signs, shutters and windows are shattered. The fear of an annexation by Italy is the reason for a violent attitude by some members of the Croat majority towards the Italian minority.

=== February ===
- February 12–24 – Conference of London: Leaders of the United Kingdom, France and Italy meet to discuss the partitioning of the Ottoman Empire. The allied powers reach agreements that would form the basis of their arguments at the San Remo conference.
- February 14, the Rome–Tokyo Raid, a cross-Eurasian flight from Rome to Tokyo undertaken by the pilot Arturo Ferrarin and organized by Harukichi Shimoi and Gabrielle D'Annunzio begins.

=== April ===
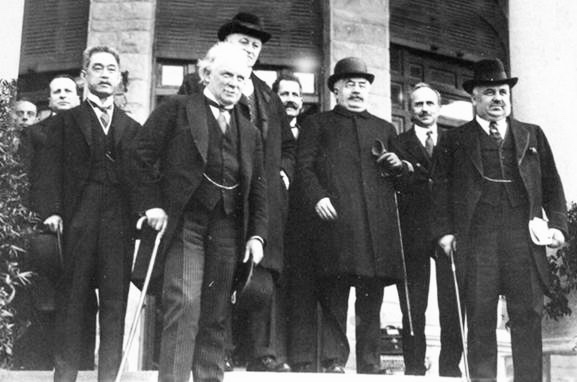
After the resolution on 25 April 1920, from left to right: Matsui, Lloyd George, Curzon, Berthelot, Millerand, Vittorio Scialoja, and Nitti.

- April – Turin metal-workers, in particular at the Fiat plants, go on strike demanding recognition for their 'factory councils'. The 'factory councils' more and more saw themselves as the models for a new democratically controlled economy running industrial plants, instead of as a bargaining tool with employers.
- April 19–26 – San Remo conference held at Castle Devachan in Sanremo, Italy. Representatives of Italy, France, the United Kingdom and Japan meet to determine the League of Nations mandates for administration of territories following partitioning of the Ottoman Empire. The conference was attended by the four Principal Allied Powers of World War I who were represented by the prime ministers of Britain (David Lloyd George), France (Alexandre Millerand), Italy (Francesco Nitti) and by Japan's Ambassador Keishirō Matsui.

=== May ===
- May 31, the Rome–Tokyo Raid, a cross-Eurasian flight from Rome to Tokyo organized by Harukichi Shimoi and Gabrielle D'Annunzio ends with Arturo Ferrarin arriving in Japan to much fanfare.

=== June ===
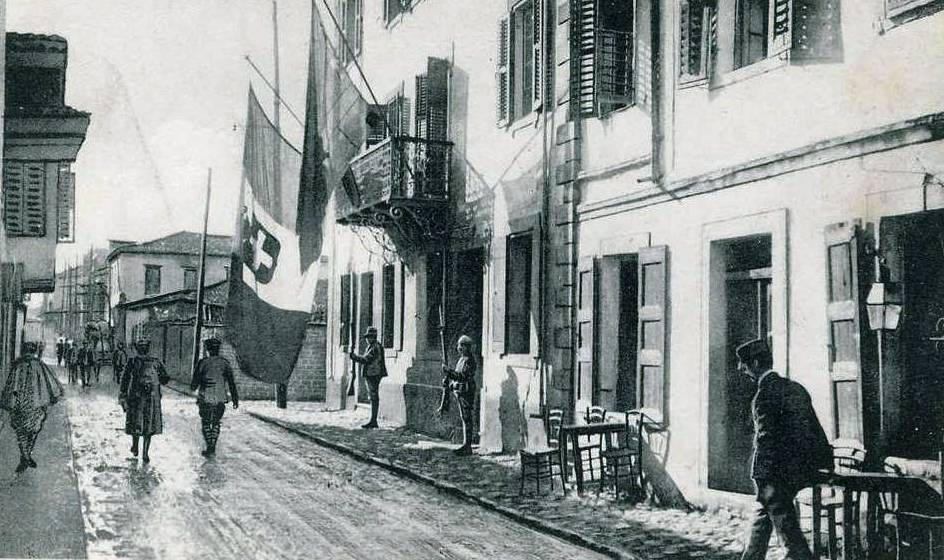
Italian soldiers in Vlorë, Albania during World War I. The tricolour flag of Italy bearing the Savoy royal shield is shown hanging alongside an Albanian flag from the balcony of the Italian prefecture headquarters.

- June 4–August 5 – Vlora War, a series of battles between an Italian forces garrisoned in the Vlorë region and small groups of Albanian patriots. The revolutionary movements in Italy made the presence of the last 20,000 soldiers of the Italian Army in Albania basically impossible.
- June 15 – Prime Minister Francesco Saverio Nitti resigns. His cabinet had to deal with great social unrest and dissatisfaction over the results of the Treaty of Versailles. Particularly troublesome was the agitation over Fiume led by Gabriele D'Annunzio. Nitti had great difficulty keeping the administration functioning at all, thanks to the enmity between the extremely divergent political factions and the upcoming fascists. He is succeeded by the veteran Giovanni Giolitti.
- June 18 – The Federation of Metal Workers Employees (Italian: Federazione Impiegati Operai Metallurgici, (FIOM) presents a memo with a series of demands to the National Federation of Mechanical and Metallurgy Industries (Italian: Federazione degli industriali meccanici e metallurgici), followed by similar memorials by other workers' unions. All memo's agreed on the demand for significant wage increases to compensate for the increased cost of living. The industrialists reject the demands; according to entrepreneurs, the cost of the wage increases are untenable for a production sector already in crisis. To this, unionists of FIOM replied by recalling the enormous profits accumulated during the war by the mechanical and metallurgical industries thanks to war orders.

=== July ===
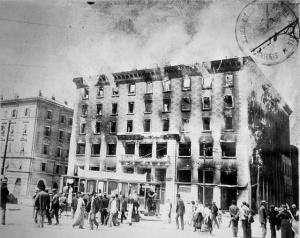
Burning Narodni Dom 1920

- July 11 – Split incident. After a Yugoslav flag is removed by two Italian naval officers in Split, a former Austro-Hungarian city under Italian military occupation, street conflict erupts between Italians and Croats. During a violent confrontation with a group of Croats, the captain and a sailor of Italian cruiser Puglia were shot and killed as well as a Croat civilian.
- July 13 – In reaction the 'Split incident', Italian Fascist Blackshirts, led by Francesco Giunta, destroy the Trieste National Hall (Narodni dom), the center of the Slovene theatre in Trieste (another former Austro-Hungarian city under Italian military occupation).

=== August ===
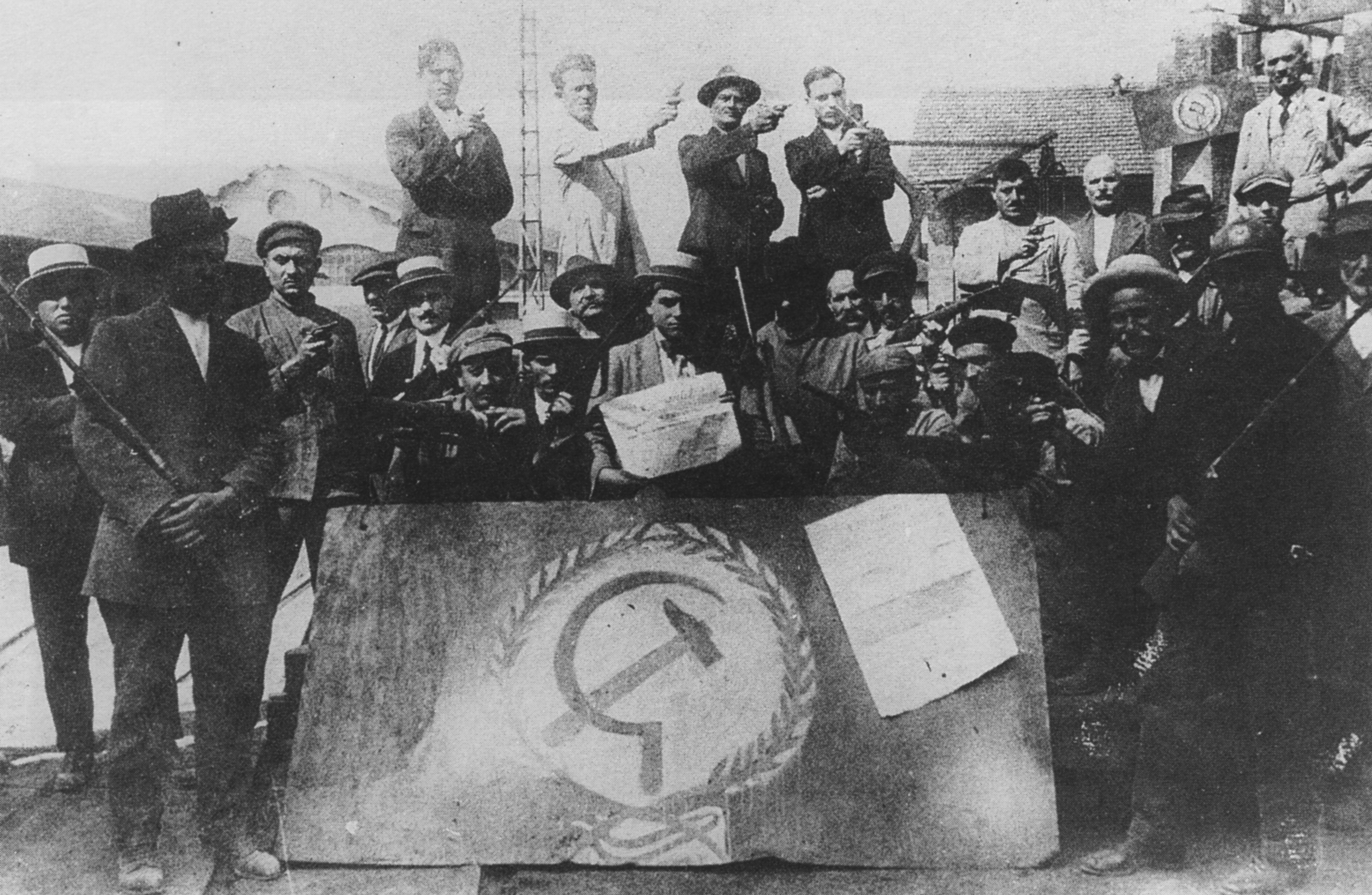
Factories manned by the Red Guards in 1920

- August 2 – An Albanian-Italian protocol is signed, upon which Italy retreated from Albania (maintaining only the island of Saseno), putting an end to Italian claims over Vlora and a mandate over Albania. A cease-fire was announced on August 5, ending all Italo-Albanian hostilities.
- August–September – Armed metal workers in Milan and Turin occupied their factories in response to a lockout by the employers. Factory occupations swept the "industrial triangle" of north-western Italy. Some 400,000 metal-workers and 100,000 others took part. On September 3, 185 metal-working factories in Turin had been occupied.
- August 30 – A lockout is proclaimed by Alfa Romeo in Milan. The Federation of Metal Workers Employees (FIOM) responds by ordering the occupation of the factory and of all the other metallurgical and ironworks factories in Milan.
- August 31 – A general lockout throughout Italy is proclaimed by the National Federation of Mechanical and Metallurgy Industries.

=== September ===
- September 7 – A magnitude 6.6 earthquake hits Garfagnana and Lunigiana in Tuscany, killing 170 people; families left homeless numbered in the thousands.
- September 8 – Gabriele D'Annunzio proclaims the Italian Regency of Carnaro in the city of Fiume, with himself as dictator, with the title of Duce.
- September 19 – Representatives of the employers' federation Confindustria and the labour union Confederazione Generale del Lavoro (CGdL) meet in Rome at a meeting chaired by Prime Minister Giovanni Giolitti. An agreement is reached on wage claims and factory workers' control. Shortly thereafter, Giolitti set up a mixed business / trade union committee, with the task of making proposals to the Government on the application of the agreement.

=== October ===
- October 10 – Italy formally annexes the territories of South Tyrol.

=== November ===
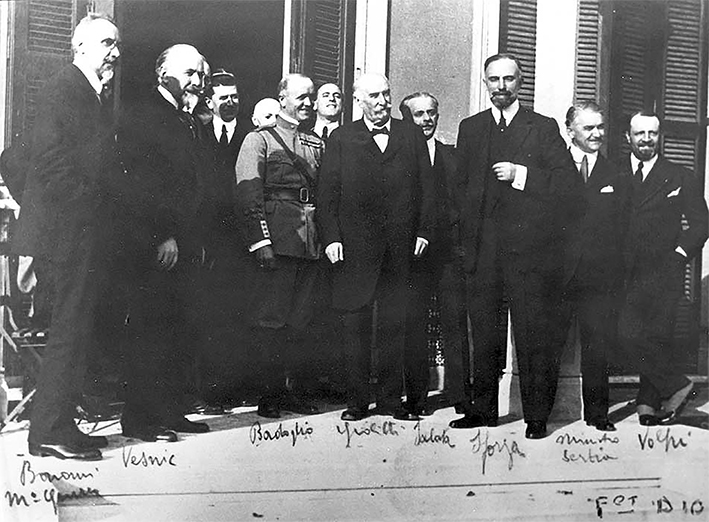
Prime ministers Giolitti and Milenko Radomar Vesnić with other delegates after signing of the Treaty of Rapallo

- November 12 – Treaty of Rapallo between Italy and the Kingdom of Serbs, Croats and Slovenes (renamed Yugoslavia in 1929), to solve the dispute over some territories in the former Austrian Littoral in the upper Adriatic, and in Dalmatia. According to the treaty, the city of Rijeka (known as Fiume in Italian) would become the independent Free State of Fiume, thus ending the military occupation of Gabriele d'Annunzio's troops, begun by the Impresa di Fiume. D'Annunzio ignored the Treaty of Rapallo and declared war on Italy itself.
- November 21 – In Bologna, fascist squadrists attack the Palazzo Accursio, the seat of the municipality, during the installation of the socialist city council presided over by Ennio Gnudi, elected October 31, causing 10 deaths and more than fifty wounded among the socialists. The squadrists' action was aimed at preventing the new municipality from flying the red flag instead of the Italian tricolour over the town hall. The squadrist offensive triggered a political process that in a couple of years would bring fascism to power.

=== December ===
- December 24–30 – The Italian army and a bombardment by the Royal Italian Navy forced the Fiuman legionnaires of Gabriele d'Annunzio to evacuate and surrender the city during the "Bloody Christmas" actions from 24 to 30 December 1920. D'Annunzio resigned on 28 December and the Regency capitulated on 30 December 1920, being occupied by Italian forces.

== Births ==
- January 1 – Virgilio Savona, Italian singer and songwriter (Quartetto Cetra) (d. 2009)
- January 3 – Renato Carosone, Italian musician and singer (d. 2001)
- January 5 – Arturo Benedetti Michelangeli, Italian pianist (d. 1995)
- January 20 – Federico Fellini, Italian film director (d. 1993)
- January 22 – Rubino Romeo Salmonì, Italian writer (d. 2011)
- April 13 – Roberto Calvi, Italian banker (d. 1982)
- April 27 – Guido Cantelli, Italian conductor (d. 1956)
- May 18 – Lucia Mannucci, Italian singer (Quartetto Cetra) (d. 2012)
- June 4 - Fedora Barbieri, Italian operatic mezzo-soprano (d. 2003)
- September 10 – Fabio Taglioni, Italian motorcycle engineer (d. 2001)
- December 9 – Carlo Azeglio Ciampi, President of the Italian Republic

== Deaths ==
- January 18 – Giovanni Capurro, Italian poet and co-creator of the world famous song, "'O sole mio" (b. 1859)
- January 24 – Amedeo Modigliani, Italian painter and sculptor (tuberculosis) (b. 1884)
- February 29 – Nicola Alongi, Sicilian socialist leader killed by the Sicilian Mafia (b. 1863)
- July 19 – Giuseppe De Felice Giuffrida, Sicilian socialist politician and journalist; mayor of Catania (b. 1859)
