= Tullio Farabola =

Italian photographer (1920–1983)

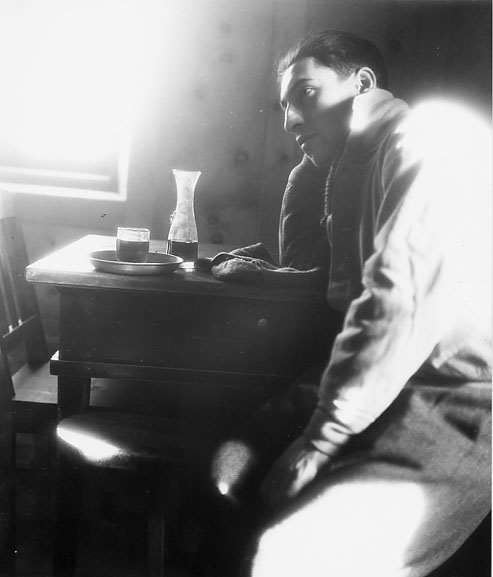
- Self-portrait in 1948
- Born: Tullio Farabola; 8 October 1920; Milan, Italy
- Died: 11 December 1983 (aged 63); Milan, Italy
- Occupation: photographer

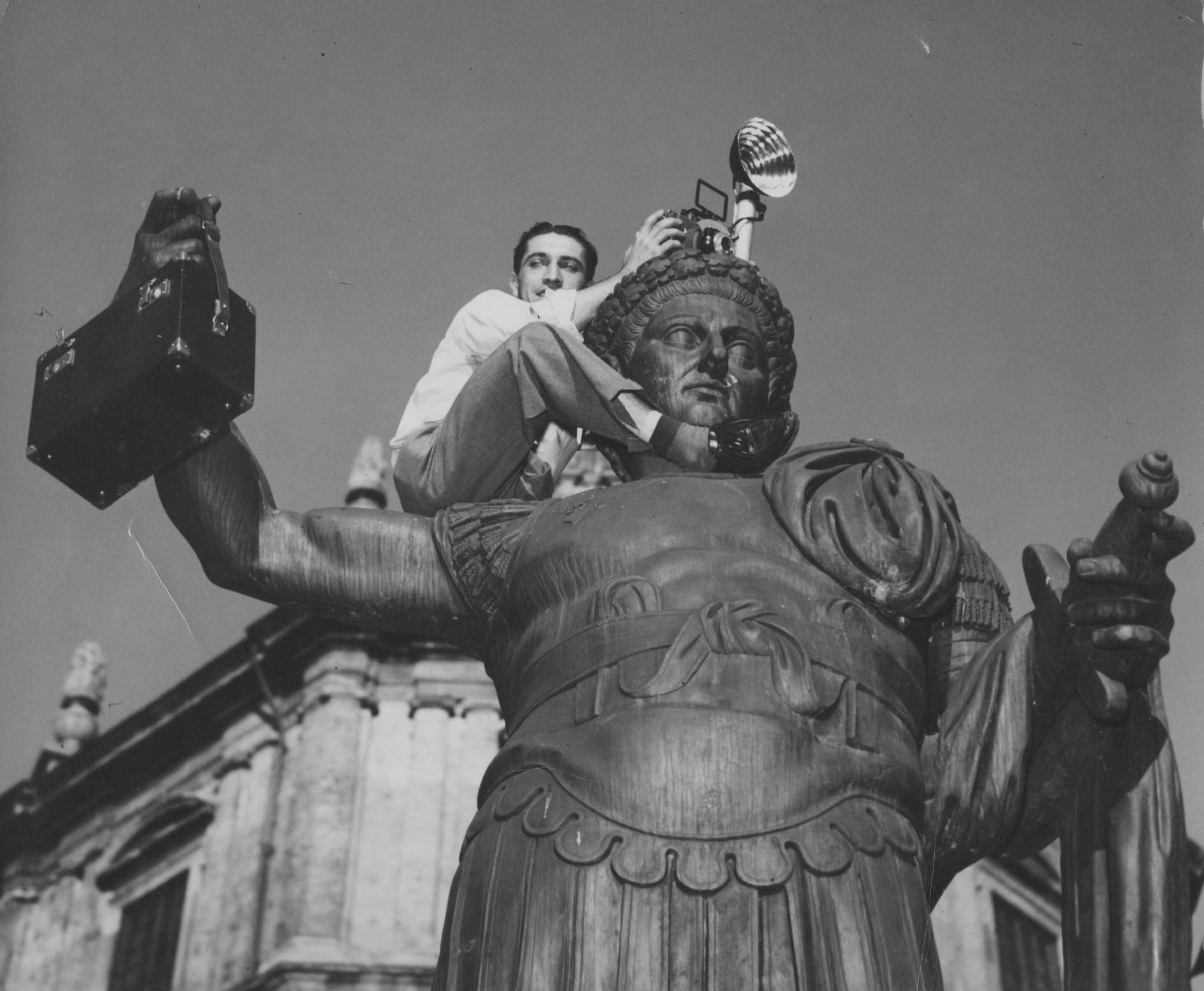
Tullio Farabola in action on the monument to Costantino in Milan.

Tullio Farabola (Milan, 8 October 1920 – Milan, 11 December 1983) was an Italian photographer.

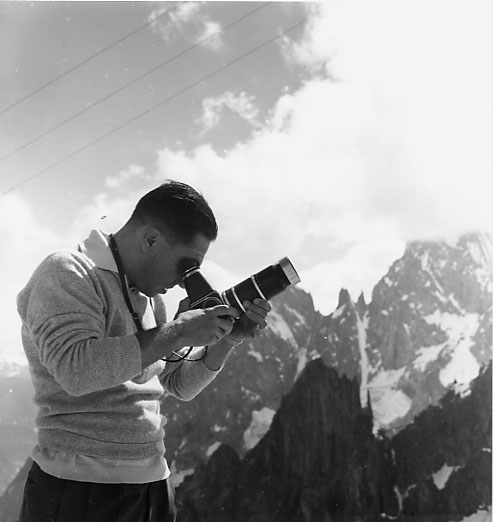
Tullio Farabola at the Mont Blanc Cableway

== Early life and education ==
Tullio Farabola was born in Milano, the son of Alessandro Farabola (known as Giuseppe Farabola), owner of a photo studio, and Ambrogina Zanardi. He entered the world of photography by following his father's footsteps.

Giuseppe Farabola, born in Milan on 12 December 1885, attended the Accademia di Belle Arti di Brera and the Scuola d'Arte Applicata del Castello Sforzesco, where he obtained a diploma as a "Specialized Photograph Retoucher". He began his professional activity as a photographer in 1896 in Milan. In 1911 he co-founded a photo studio with A. Bressani in C.so Ticinese 87 in Milan. Within a few months, however, Bressani withdrew, leaving Farabola as sole proprietor. For many years he served as the official photographer of the Archiepiscopal Curia of Milan. His studio practice ranged from portraits of prominent athletes to passport photos and group portraits. He married Ambrogina Zanardi on 22 April 1909, the couple had two children, Ada in 1910 and Tullio in 1920. He retired in 1954 and died in Rapallo on 13 April 1967.

Tullio Farabola attended the Carlo Cattaneo Institute in Milan where he graduated in accounting in 1939. During World War II he enrolled in a course in war cinematography at the Istituto L.U.C.E. in Rome. Here he met Adolfo Porry Pastorel, the father of Italian photojournalism, founder in 1908 of the "Agenzia VEDO", an Italian photographic agency. Porry would become a key reference point in Farabola's professional formation.

== War Photography and Historical Documentation ==
In 1943 Farabola came back to Milan; during an allied bombing raid in August of that year, the Farabola photographic studio - together with its negatives and equipment - was destroyed. Between 1943 and 1945 he documented some of the most dramatic events of the period: the German occupation, the last speech of Mussolini, the devastation and civilian casualties caused allied bombings - including the widely known photograph of the children killed in the Gorla school tragedy (1944), the Liberation of Milan on 25 April 1945, when German troops withdrew and the leaders of the Committee of National Liberation marched through the city alongside the partisans. He also recorded the display in Piazzale Loreto of the bodies of Mussolini, Clara Petacci and the fascist hierarchs arrested in Dongo, as well as the execution of Buffarini Guidi, minister of the interior during the "Repubblica Sociale Italiana".

== The Founding of Farabola Photo Agency ==
After the war Tullio Farabola resumed his work as a photojournalist, and founded the Farabola photo agency, based in C.so Ticinese 60 in Milan. His work from this period captured the hardships of a city exhausted by war—poverty, hunger, the black market, dormitories, the Cucine Economiche, juvenile detention at the Beccaria prison, the revolt at San Vittore prison led by Ezio Barbieri, raids of prostitutes, clandestine gambling - as well as major political and social events, such as the attack on Togliatti. Gradually, his images also documented the city’s recovery: the reopening of La Scala, the revival of the Galleria Vittorio Emanuele, the return of Toscanini, the re-emergence of public leisure, and the early signs of the economic boom across entertainment, sport, and fashion.

In these years, Italian photojournalism expanded rapidly, fueled by the restoration of press freedom after two decades of Fascist censorship. The publishing industry demanded an ever-growing supply of images covering current affairs, culture, and politics, leading to the emergence of a dense network of photo agencies. In Milan, the most prominent included Publifoto, founded by Vincenzo Carrese, Tullio Farabola's Farabola and Fedele Toscani's Rotofoto. Crime reporting, previously suppressed, gained particular prominence. In 1946, the widely publicized case of Rina Fort - who murdered her lover's wife and children - brought Farabola national attention, especially through the striking image of the accused asleep on a sofa in a police station.

Farabola's principal models were Adolfo Porry Pastorel and the American photojournalists. The photographs he produced between 1943 and 1960 are considered the most powerful and representative of his style.

Alongside reportage, Farabola devoted increasing attention to the development of his agency’s studio production. He created magazine covers for leading weeklies such as Oggi, Gente and Radiocorriere TV, designed record covers for artists including Renato Carosone, Fred Buscaglione and produced black-and-white portraits of major cultural figures, among them Salvatore Quasimodo, Eugenio Montale, Riccardo Bacchelli, Indro Montanelli, Giorgio De Chirico, Juliette Gréco. During the 1950s and 1960s, being photographed by Farabola came to be regarded as a mark of professional recognition for figures in entertainment, art, and sport.

The agency relied on a network of collaborators, including Franco Gremignani, Lucio Berzioli, Sergio Del Grande, Sergio Bersani, Adalberto Guarnerio, Eros Biavati, Settimio Garritano, Angelo Cozzi, Pietro Pascuttini. other Italian photographers, such as Marco Secchi, drew inspiration from Farabola early in their careers..

Studio productions were typically the result of close teamwork. Lucio Berzioli, for instance, specialized in sourcing props and settings, demonstrating a particular talent for selecting furniture, clothing, and objects that enhanced the visual composition. The aesthetic of Farabola’s black-and-white portraits shows the influence of Yousuf Karsh, while his record covers drew inspiration from leading American advertising photographers, particularly in their use of large format (8×10-inch) transparencies - then uncommon in Italy.

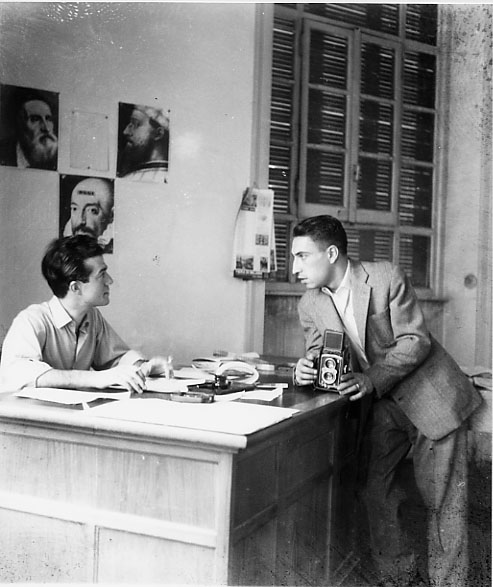
Tullio Farabola in the editorial office of a newspaper

== The Historical Photographic Archive ==
In the early 1960s, Farabola began systematically organizing a historical photographic archive, which would become one of the most comprehensive and well-structured in Italy.

Interest in images of Fascism and the war increased markedly around 1960, on the twentieth anniversary of Italy’s entry into the conflict. Responding to this demand, Farabola expanded the archive through significant acquisitions.

Among the earliest and most important was the archive of the VEDO Agency, founded by Adolfo Porry Pastorel, acquired in the mid-1950s. This was followed by the archives of Mario Agosto—photographer for the “Italia” Navigation Company (transatlantic liners Conte Grande, Rex, Andrea Doria, Michelangelo and Raffaello), of the portraitists Arturo Ermini, Attilio Badodi and Giuseppe Felici, official photographer to the Holy See from 1920 to 1970). In 1960, Farabola also began acquiring photographs of the Second World War from foreign agencies, subsequently publishing them in major Italian weeklies. The initiative proved highly successful and further enriched the archive.

Particularly significant were acquisitions from the Imperial War Museum in London, which included aerial photographs taken by the Royal Air Force of bombed cities—among the first such materials to be imported into Italy. In Berlin, exchanges were arranged between Italian photographs of Fascism and German images of Nazism, leading to the acquisition of photographs by Heinrich Hoffmann depicting Adolf Hitler, as well as images of Hermann Göring, Manfred von Richthofen (the “Red Baron”), and scenes of hyperinflation in the Weimar Republic. The creation, expansion and management of the historical archive was largely handled by Alberto Crivelli, a collaborator of the agency since 1948 and its director from Farabola's death until 1990.

Tullio Farabola's work has been documented by numerous publications which have focused mainly on his photojournalism, and on the historical archive while his studio activity has received comparatively little scholarly attention.

Tullio Farabola died in Milan on 11 December 1983.

Today, part of his photographic legacy remains accessible through the A.F. Archivi Farabola, whose work is dedicated to the preservation, restoration, and digitization of his images.

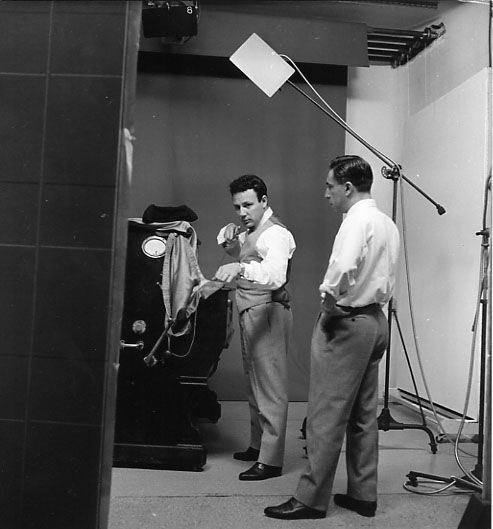
Tullio Farabola with Claudio Villa.

== Published works, during his life ==
- Prinzhofer, R. (1978). Le città galleggianti. Navi e crociere negli anni '30. Milano: Longanesi & C. p. 8.
- Ormezzano, G.P. (1978). Storia del Calcio. Milano. p. 12.
- Brogi, C. (1980). Come eravamo. 30 anni di vita milanese. Milano. p. 10.
- Farabola, Tullio (1980). Farabola, un archivio italiano. Milano: Mazzotta.
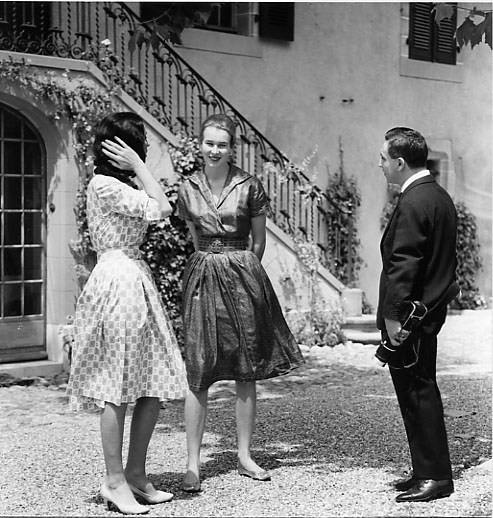
- Tullio Farabola with Maria Gabriella di Savoia.
  Afeltra, Gaetano (a cura di) (1982). Farabola fotografo d'assalto. Cronaca di Milano negli anni Quaranta. Milano: Rusconi Libri S.p.A.

== Published works, after his death ==
- Dizionario Biografico degli Italiani Vol.46. Roma: Ed. Istituto della Enciclopedia Italiana fondata da Giovanni Treccani. 1996. pp. 761–762.
- Lucas, Uliano, ed. (2004). Storia d'Italia. Annali 20. L'immagine fotografica 1945–2000. Venezia: Giulio Einaudi Editore.
- Russo, Antonella (2011). Storia culturale della fotografia italiana. Torino: Einaudi. pp. 57, 59, 70, fig. 25.
- D'Autilia, Gabriele (2012). Storia della fotografia in Italia. Torino: Einaudi. pp. 223, 224, 249, 276, 324, 337.
- Colasanti, Vania (2013). Scatto Matto. Venezia: Gli Specchi Marsilio. pp. 93–94.
- Uliano Lucas, Tatiana Agliani (2015). La realtà e lo sguardo. Torino: Einaudi. pp. 86, 88, 92, 134, 155, 161, 164, 165, 169, 171, 210, 219–222, 226.

== Photobooks with contributions by Tullio Farabola ==
- Viganò, Enrica, ed. (2006). Neorealismo, la nuova immagine in Italia. Milano: Admira Edizioni. pp. 77, 95, 98, 103, 218, 257.
- Ursula, Salwa; Wanderlingh, Attilio, eds. (2010). Storia fotografica di Milano. Napoli: Edizioni Intra Moenia. pp. 128, 129, 134, 135, 136, 139, 141, 142, 143, 153, 155, 161, 165, 171, 178.
- Galli, Stefano, ed. (2016). Milano storia di una rinascita. Palazzo Morando 10/11/2016 - 12/2/2017. Milano: Spirale d'idee. pp. 50, 69, 93, 111, 112, 146–151, 157, 159, 161, 163, 185, 187, 189, 200–204, 212–223, 225, 251, 274–277, 280–283, 288, 289, 291, 293, 295.
- Galli, Stefano, ed. (2017). Milano e la mala. Palazzo Morando 9/11/2017 – 11/2/2018. Milano: Spirale d'idee. pp. 19, 49, 55, 58, 66, 67, 87, 88, 90, 92, 93, 109, 113–117, 118–120, 121, 127, 130, 137, 156, 181, 205, 220, 223, 233, 237, 260, 261.
- Galli, Stefano, ed. (2019). Milano anni '60. Palazzo Morando 6/11/2019 – 9/2/2020. Milano: Milano in Mostra. pp. 32, 36, 44, 62, 134, 171, 192, 205, 207, 213, 224, 244, 249.
- Menduni, Enrico, ed. (2021). Adolfo Porry Pastorel. L'altro sguardo. Nascita del fotogiornalismo in Italia. Museo di Roma - Palazzo Braschi 1/7 - 24/10/2021. Milano: Electaphoto. pp. 125, 30, 74, 78, 80–97, 99–104.
- Menduni, Enrico, ed. (2022). Anni interessanti. Momenti di vita italiana. 1960 - 1975. Museo di Roma in Trastevere 13/5 - 16/10/2022. Milano: Electaphoto. pp. 23, 24, 26–28, 30–34, 38, 40, 43, 46–48, 51, 53, 56–60, 64–66, 68–70, 73, 76, 81, 91, 93, 114, 124, 130, 132, 140.
