= 1924 in Italy =

- Decades: 1900s; 1910s; 1920s; 1930s; 1940s
- See also: History of Italy; Timeline of Italian history; List of years in Italy

Events in the year 1924 in the Kingdom of Italy.

== Incumbents ==
- King – Victor Emmanuel III
- Prime Minister – Benito Mussolini

== Events ==
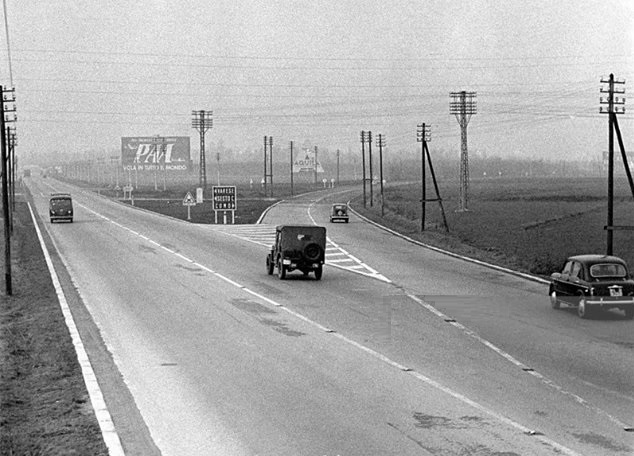
The Italian Autostrada dei Laghi ("Lakes Motorway" in the 1950s; now parts of the Autostrada A8 and the Autostrada A9), the first controlled-access highway ever built in the world

- 27 January – Treaty of Rome (1924)
- 6 April – Italian general election, 1924
- 21 September – Inauguration of the Autostrada dei Laghi, the first controlled-access highway ever built in the world.
- 6 October – 1-RO begins regular radio broadcasting services

=== Sport ===
- 25 January to 5 February – Italy participated at the 1924 Winter Olympics in Chamonix, with 23 competitors in 4 sports
- 4 May to 27 July – Italy participated at the 1924 Winter Olympics in Paris, with 200 competitors in 18 sports, winning a total of 16 medals (8 gold, 3 silver and 5 bronze)

=== Unknown ===
- – The Benito Mussolini government pass a law in 1924 requiring that every school display a Crucifix.

== Births ==
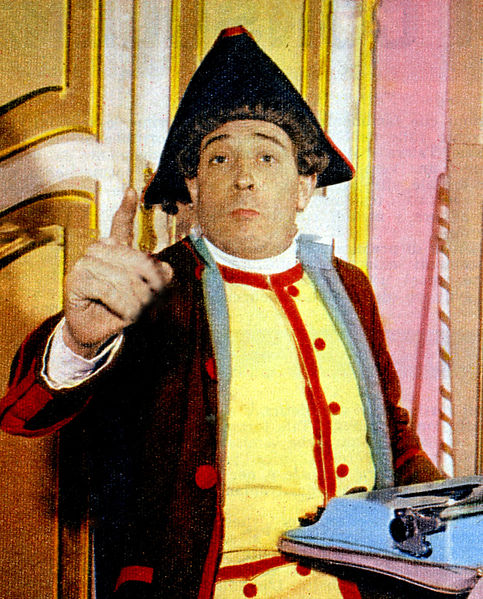
Ignazio Colnaghi in 1959

- 9 January – Walkiria Terradura, anti-fascist partisan (d. 2023)
- 29 January – Luigi Nono, composer (d. 1990)
- 2 February – Ignazio Colnaghi, actor (d. 2017)
- 8 March – Walter Chiari, actor (d. 1991)
- 23 April – Rossana Rossanda, politician and journalist (d. 2020)
- 30 June – Maino Neri, footballer (d. 1995)
- 9 July – Domenico Pace, fencer (d. 2022)
- 13 July - Carlo Bergonzi, operatic tenor (d. 2014)
- 4 August – Antonio Maccanico, Italian constitutional specialist, social liberal politician (d. 2013)
- 12 August – Lucy Salani, political activist (d. 2023)
- 25 August – Sergio Bergonzelli, director, screenwriter, producer and actor (d. 2002)
- 19 September – Rosario Mazzola, Roman Catholic prelate (d. 2018)
- 8 November – Gino Scarpa, painter, printmaker and sculptor (d. 2022)
- 18 December – Alberto Ablondi, bishop (d. 2010)

== Deaths ==
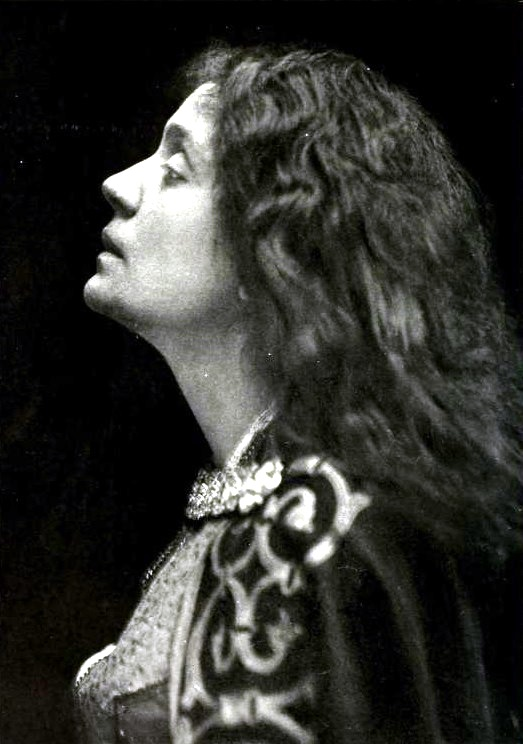
Eleonora Duse

- 8 April – Fiorenzo Bava Beccaris, general, known for the Bava Beccaris massacre (b. 1831)
- 10 June – Giacomo Matteotti, politician (b. 1885)
- 17 July – Ricciotti Garibaldi, soldier (b. 1847)

=== Full date missing ===
- Tito Conti, painter (b. 1842)
- Francesco Franceschi, horticulturist (b. 1843)
