= 1922 in Italy =

- Decades: 1900s; 1910s; 1920s; 1930s; 1940s
- See also: History of Italy; Timeline of Italian history; List of years in Italy

Events from the year 1922 in Italy.

== Kingdom of Italy ==
- Monarch – Victor Emmanuel III (1900–1946)
- Prime Minister –
  1. Ivanoe Bonomi (1921–1922)
  2. Luigi Facta (1922)
  3. Benito Mussolini (1922–1943)
- Population – 38,196,000

== Events ==
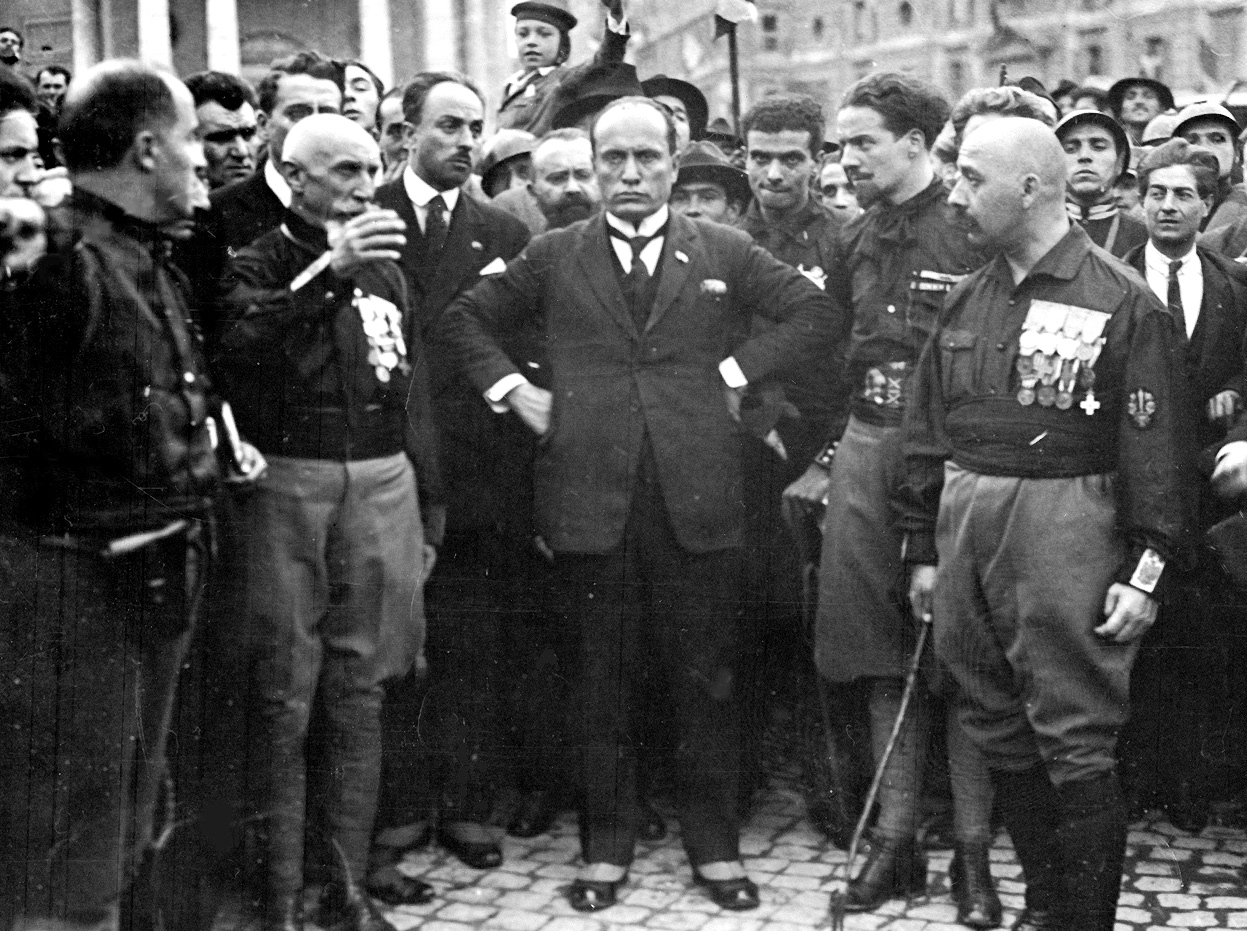
The fascist Quadrumvirate at the congress in Naples, held as a "general test" for the march on Rome implemented a few days later. From left to right Emilio De Bono, Benito Mussolini, Italo Balbo and Cesare Maria De Vecchi.

The year 1922 is characterized by the March on Rome and the rise to power of the fascists with the nomination of Benito Mussolini as Prime Minister, the beginning of the Fascist regime (1922–1943) in Italy.

=== January ===
- 22 January – Pope Benedict XV dies.
- 26 January – Italian forces occupy Misrata in Libya. The reconquest of Libya begins.

=== February ===
- 2 February – Prime Minister Ivanoe Bonomi steps down.
- 6 February – Pope Pius XI is elected on the Papal conclave's fourteenth ballot.
- 17 February – The attempt of outgoing Prime Minister Bonomi to form a new government fails.
- 20 February – The Alleanza del lavoro, a unified front of left-wing trade unions and political parties is formed against the rise of Fascism and its Blackshirts.
- 26 February – Appointment of Luigi Facta as Prime Minister.

=== March ===
- 1 March – The Second Congress of the Italian Communist Party takes place in Rome. The congressional conclusions, known as "Thesis of Rome," deny any hypothesis of collaboration in anti-fascist coalitions with other socialist forces or bourgeois parties. The PCd'I's main objective remains the prospect of a revolutionary solution.
- 3 March – Nationalists and fascists attack the government building of Fiume and proclaim annexation to Italy. The Italian government refuses to take over the powers in the city and provisionally entrusts it to a military command.

=== May ===
- 1 May – Large fascist crowds in Bologna and Rovigo violently oppose the general strike proclaimed by the Socialists during the Labour Day.
- 12 May – Fascist concentration in Ferrara of 40,000 militants led by Italo Balbo and backed by the agrarian associations. The "fascist strike" of the workers is proclaimed. The aim of the event is to press on the Government to launch a plan for the construction of public works in the province.
- 26 May – Fascist concentration in Bologna to remove the prefect Cesare Mori, accused of having used the police to suppress the actions of fascist squads. Military authorities are granted full powers. They come to terms with the fascists, who, having assured the substitution of the prefect, begin to demobilize.

=== June ===
- 2 June – A group of socialist parliamentarians, led by Filippo Turati, declares to be willing to support a government capable of ensuring the restoration of law and freedom. The following day, the Board of Directors of the CGdL aligns itself with the same positions.

=== July ===
- 19 July – Prime Minister Luigi Facta steps down. Mussolini threatens with Fascist insurrection.
- 31 July – The labour movement decides to engage in a general strike, proclaimed to be an "anti-Fascist legalitarian strike" by the Socialist leader Filippo Turati because destined to fight against Fascist subversion. The failure is total. The National Fascist Party (Italian: Partito Nazionale Fascista, PNF) gives the government 48 hours to restore order, otherwise Fascism would move in to "save the state".

=== August ===
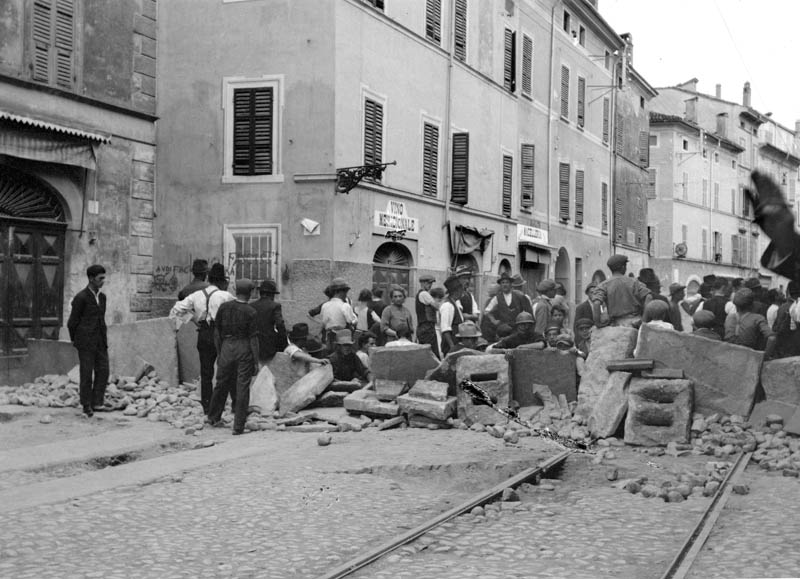
Anti-fascist barricade on the streets of Parma

- 1 August – Prime Minister Facta forms a new government.
- 1–3 August – The "anti-Fascist legalitarian strike" brings the country on the brink of civil war. The strike is called off on 2 August. Fights break out in Milan, Genova, and Ancona, which are occupied by Fascist militias.
  In Parma a series of battles, known as the Parma Barricades, between anti-fascist forces of the Arditi del Popolo and the Proletarian Defense Formations against the fascist Blackshirts take place from 2-6 August. On 6 August, the fascists passed control of public order to the army, pledging to withdraw, but the fascist siege of Parma persisted for three more months.
- 13 August – At a meeting of the National Council of the Fascist National Party it is decided to start planning the March on Rome. The political direction is entrusted to Mussolini, Michele Bianchi and Cesare Rossi. The organizational and military preparations are entrusted to Italo Balbo.

=== October ===
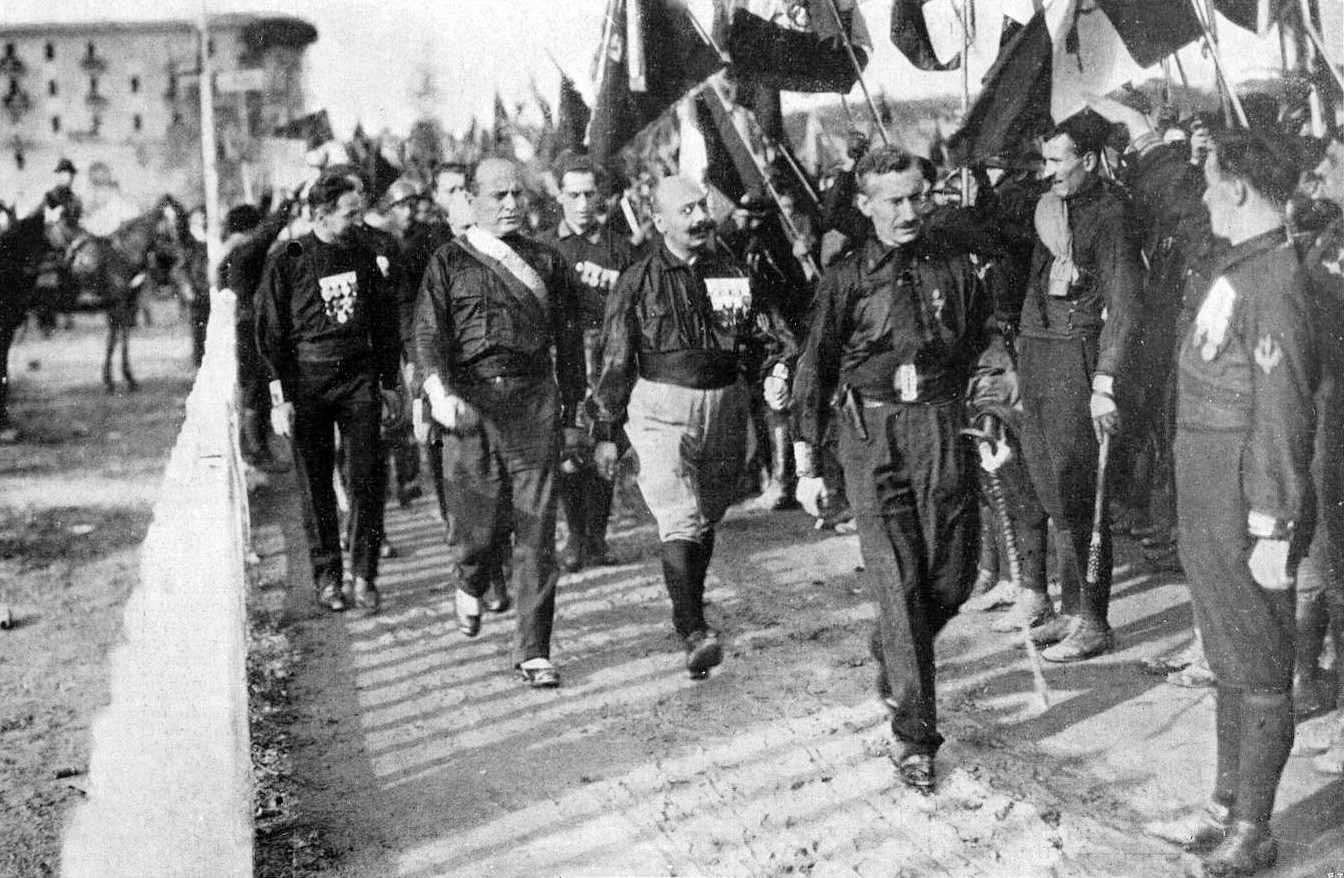
From left to right: Italo Balbo, Benito Mussolini, Cesare Maria de Vecchi and Michele Bianchi gathered in Naples on 24 October 1922

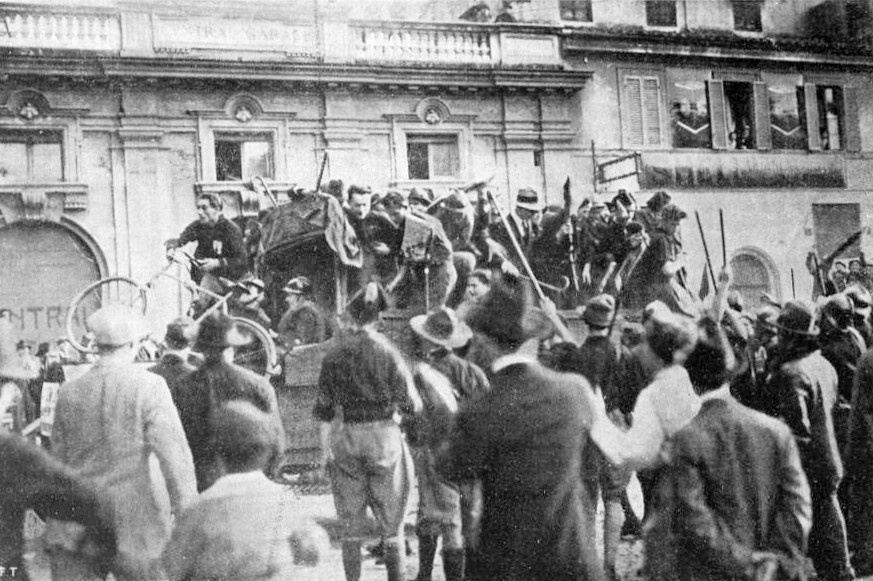
March on Rome: The entry into Rome of the first truck loaded with fascists on 28 October 1922

- 1 October – The Congress of the Italian Socialist Party begins in Rome. The meeting is marked by a fierce controversy against the reformists, whose current, headed by Filippo Turati, Claudio Treves and Giacomo Matteotti, is expelled. The reformists immediately form the Unitary Socialist Party (PSU).
- 6 October – At a meeting in Milan, Mussolini declares "In Italy there exists two governments - a fictitious one, run by Facta, and a real one, run by the Fascists. The first of these must give way to the second." He and demands new general elections. Rumours abound about a Fascist takeover of Rome.
- 24 October – Mussolini declares before 60,000 people at the Fascist Congress in Naples: "Or we will be given the government, or we will take it marching to Rome." Meanwhile, the Blackshirts, who had occupied the Po plain, took all strategic points of the country.
- 25 October – Mussolini proposes to Prime Minister Facta to form a government including Fascists. Facta informs the king about the initiative, who agrees. However, Mussolini withdraws the proposal. At the same time, he also rejects an agreement with Giovanni Giolitti, who offers the participation of four Fascist ministers and four sub-secretaries.
- 26–28 October – March on Rome, led by Italo Balbo, Michele Bianchi, Emilio De Bono and Cesare Maria De Vecchi (Quadrumviri del Fascismo). Fascist blackshirts converge on Rome from various regions of Italy, occupying prefectures and railway stations. Mussolini is in Milan, where he negotiates at a distance with the king and the government. Civilian authorities hand over power to the military authorities. King Victor Emmanuel III announces his intention to appoint Fascist leader Benito Mussolini as Prime Minister of Italy and refuses to sign a state of siege, proposed by Prime Minister Facta.
- 31 October – Prime Minister Facta steps down. Appointment of Mussolini as Prime Minister.

=== November ===
- 17 November – With 196 votes in favour, 16 against and 7 abstentions, the Italian Chamber of Deputies confides confidence in the Mussolini government.

=== December ===
- 18–20 December – Turin Massacre. Fascists blackshirts attack members of the local socialist and communist movement in Turin, to break the resistance of the labour movement and working class. Eleven people were killed and ten were seriously wounded.

== Births ==
- 14 January – Hank Biasatti, basketball player (died 1996)
- 16 January – Ernesto Bonino, Italian pop and jazz singer whose peak of popularity was during the 1940s and 50s (d. 2008)
- 1 February - Renata Tebaldi, soprano (d. 2004)
- 5 March – Pier Paolo Pasolini, Italian film director, poet, writer and intellectual (d. 1975)
- 23 March – Ugo Tognazzi, Italian film, TV, and theatre actor, director, and screenwriter (d. 1990)
- 28 March – Felice Chiusano, one of the singers of Quartetto Cetra, a popular Italian vocal quartet (d. 1990)
- 19 April – Luigi Barbarito, Italian prelate (d. 2017)
- 24 April – Susanna Agnelli, Italian politician, businesswoman and writer. She was the first woman to be appointed minister of foreign affairs in Italy (d. 2009)
- 25 May – Enrico Berlinguer, Italian communist politician (d. 1984)
- 12 June – Margherita Hack, Italian astrophysicist and popular science writer. The asteroid 8558 Hack, discovered in 1995, was named in her honour (d. 2013)
- 22 June – Osvaldo Fattori, Italian football (soccer) player (d. 2017)
- 26 June – Enzo Apicella, UK-based artist, cartoonist, designer, and restaurateur (d. 2018)
- 23 July – Maria-Antonietta Macciocchi, Italian journalist, writer, feminist and politician (d. 2007)
- 1 September – Vittorio Gassman, Italian theatre and film actor (d. 2000)
- 1 November – Ezio Barbieri, Italian criminal (d. 2018)
- 15 November – Giuseppe Guarino, law scholar and politician (died 2020)
- 22 November – Francesco Rosi, Italian film director (d. 2015)
- 18 December - Cesare Valletti, Italian operatic tenor (d. 2000)

== Deaths ==
- 22 January – Pope Benedict XV, born Giacomo Paolo Giovanni Battista della Chiesa (b. 1854)
- 27 January – Giovanni Verga, Italian writer (b. 1840)
- 20 June – Vittorio Monti, Italian composer (b. 1868)
- 25 September – Carlo Caneva, Italian general (b. 1845)
- 18 December – Pietro Ferrero, one of the victims of the 1922 Turin Massacre (b. 1892)
