= 1923 in Italy =

- Decades: 1900s; 1910s; 1920s; 1930s; 1940s
- See also: History of Italy; Timeline of Italian history; List of years in Italy

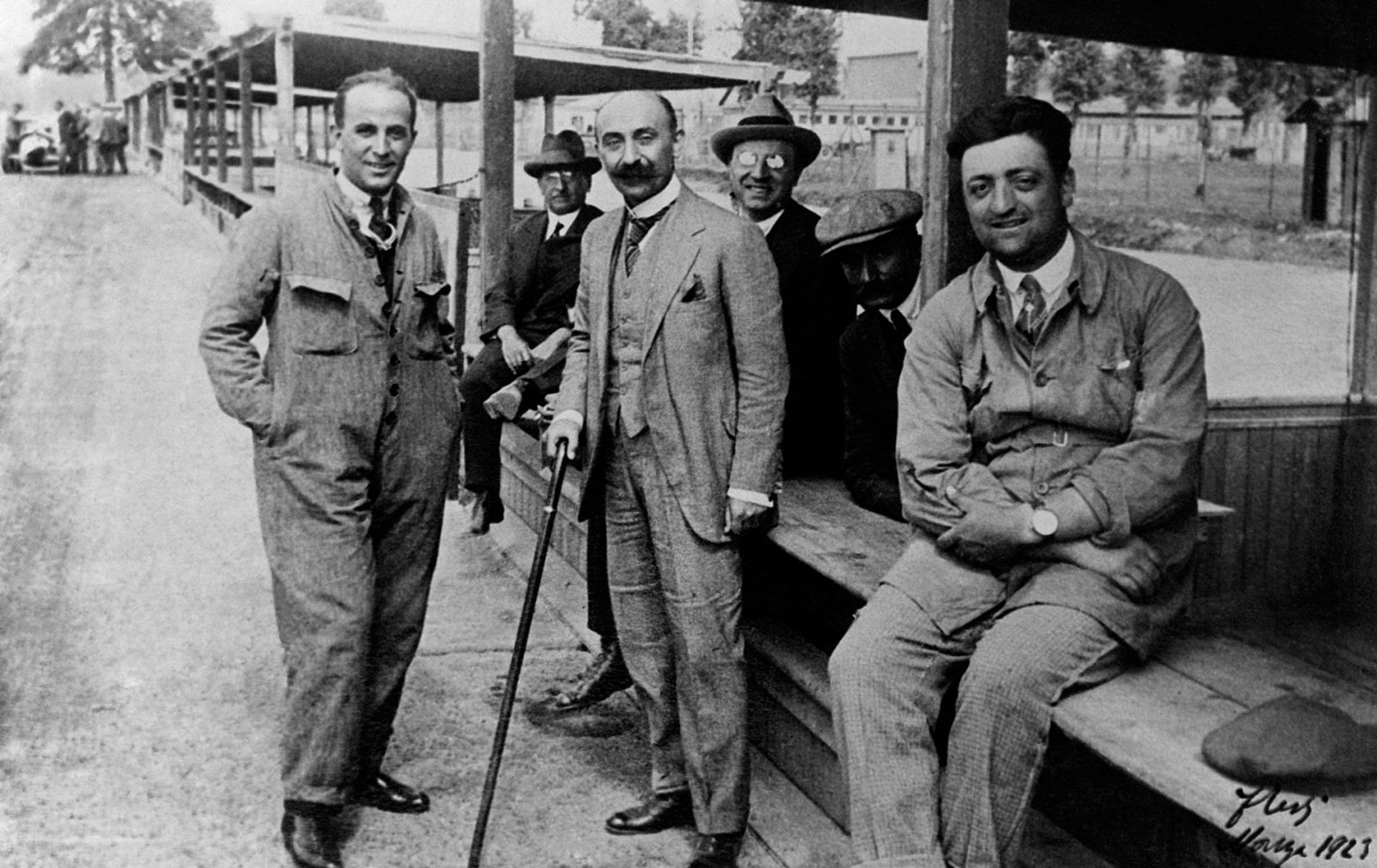
Enzo Ferrari, Nicola Romeo, and Giorgio Rimini at Monza, possibly in 1923

Events from the year 1923 in Italy.

== Incumbents ==
- King – Victor Emmanuel III
- Prime Minister – Benito Mussolini

== Events ==
- 28 March – Regia Aeronautica, the air force of Italy, is founded.
- 18 June – Mount Etna erupts in Italy, making 60,000 homeless
- 18 November – The Acerbo Law goes into effect giving Mussolini's fascist party a majority of deputies. The law was used only in the 1924 general election, which was the last competitive election held in Italy until 1946.
- 1 December – In Italy, the Gleno Dam on the Gleno River, in the Valle di Scalve in the northern province of Bergamo bursts, killing at least 356 people

== Births ==
- 1 January – Valentina Cortese, actress
- 10 February – Cesare Siepi, opera singer
- 12 February – Franco Zeffirelli, filmmaker
- 7 June – Giorgio Belladonna, bridge player
- 15 October – Italo Calvino, writer and journalist

== Deaths ==
- 19 August – Vilfredo Pareto, polymath (b. 1848)

== See also ==
- 1923 in Italian television
- List of Italian films of 1923
