= 1921 in Italy =

- Decades: 1900s; 1910s; 1920s; 1930s; 1940s
- See also: History of Italy; Timeline of Italian history; List of years in Italy

Events from the year 1921 in Italy.

== Kingdom of Italy ==
- Monarch – Victor Emmanuel III (1900–1946)
- Prime Minister –
  1. Giovanni Giolitti (1920–1921)
  2. Ivanoe Bonomi (1921–1922)
- Population – 39,943,528

== Events ==
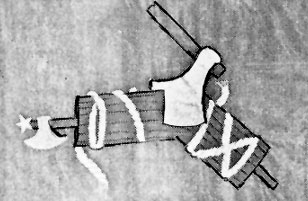
Logo of the Arditi del Popolo, an axe cutting a fasces.

In 1921 Fascist and anti-Fascist violence in Italy grew with Italian army officers beginning to assist the Fascists with their violence against communists and socialists. With the Fascist movement growing, anti-fascists of various political allegiances combined into the Arditi del Popolo (People's Militia).
The Italian police forces are sympathizing with the Fascist movement and do little to stop the violence and illegal acts. Also helping them are local magistrates, who crack down on leftists but give Fascists lenient sentences. Along with the police and the magistrates, the military helps supply materiel to the Fascist movement. Authorities in Rome attempt to stop this collaboration but are unable to enforce control. Without the semi-official collaboration, it is hard to see how Fascism could have spread so far and so fast in 1921 and 1922 in parts of Northern and Central Italy.

=== January ===
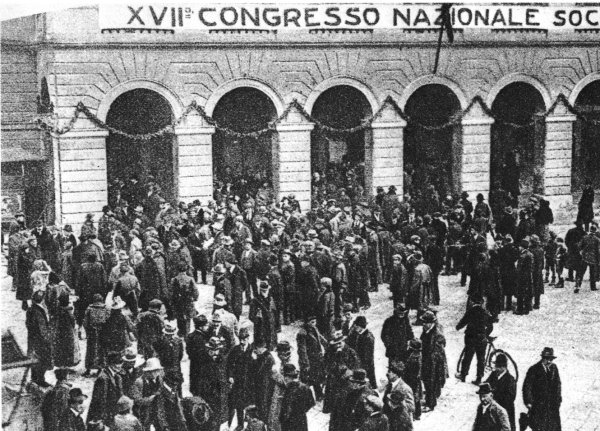
The delegates in front of the Goldoni Theatre in Livorno on 15 January 1921, the inaugural day of the 17th Congress of the Italian Socialist Party.

- January 15-21 – The XVII Congress of the Italian Socialist Party (PSI) was held at the Carlo Goldoni Theatre in Livorno from 15 to 21 January 1921. After tumultuous proceedings the congress resulted in a split in the party.
- January 21 – The Communist Party of Italy (Italian: Partito Comunista d’Italia, PCd'I) is founded in Livorno, following a split in the Italian Socialist Party at their 17th congress.

=== February ===
- February 28 – A fascist squad devastates the Camera del lavoro in Triest. Shortly afterwards the Milanese branch of the socialist newspaper Avanti! is burned down.

=== April ===
- April 26 – A fascist squad devastates the Camera del lavoro in Turin.

=== May ===
- May 15 – General election. The Liberal governing coalition of Giovanni Giolitti, strengthened by the joining of Fascist candidates in the National Bloc (35 of whom were elected deputies), came short of a majority (275 seats). The Italian Socialist Party lost many votes and seats (from 156 to 122), weakened by the split of the Communist Party of Italy (who won 16), while the Italian People's Party was steady around 20%, gaining some seats (from 100 to 107). Benito Mussolini is elected for the first time. The election was a great success for Mussolini and the Fascists, which would have been impossible without Giolitti's endorsement. By including Fascist candidates in his electoral bloc, Giolitti hoped to 'transform' or tame them.
  The inclusion in the National Bloc gave Fascism a respectable, parliamentary face, providing prefects, police and other state authorities in the provinces with an excuse to turn a blind eye to Fascist violence, and encouraged some police to cooperate with the Fascists.

=== June ===
- June 27 – Prime minister Giolitti resigns, due to the small but insufficient majority obtained at the confidence vote of June 26.

=== July ===
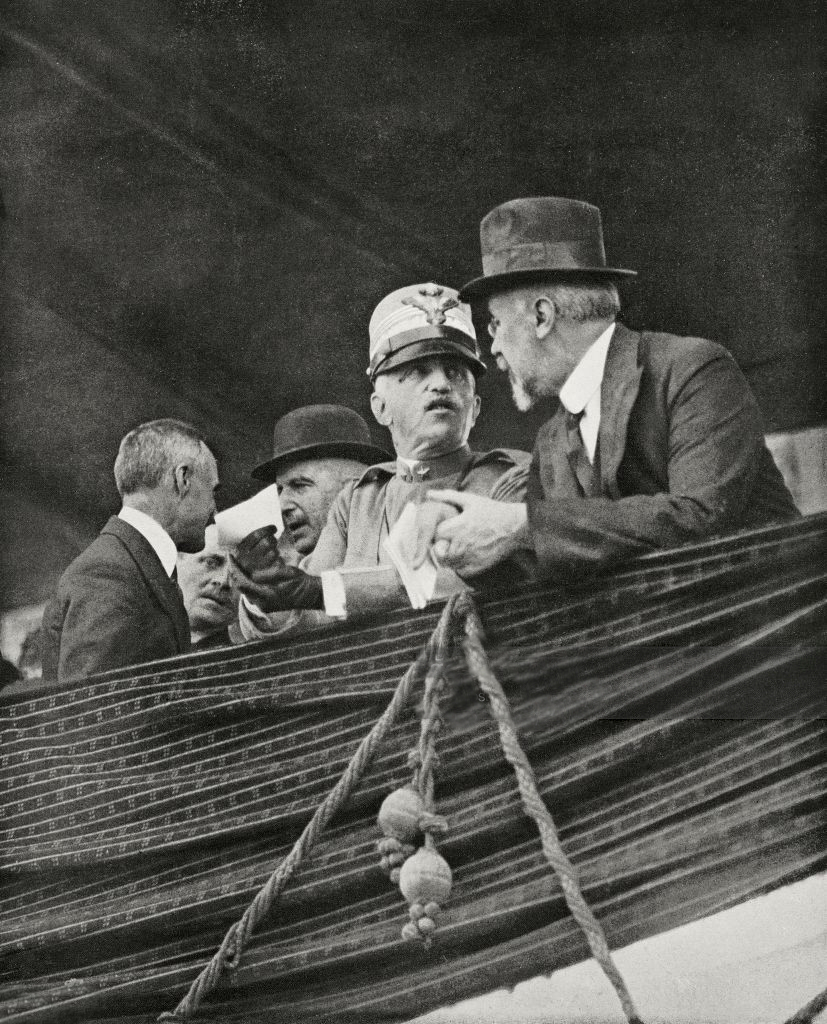
Victor Emmanuel III and Prime minister Ivanoe Bonomi

- July 4 – A new conservative government is formed by Ivanoe Bonomi, the outgoing Minister of War, a politician with guaranteed contact with the army and an independent ex-reformist socialist, who had publicly welcomed the spread of Fascism in his home province of Mantua.
- July 6 – The first public manifestation of the anti-fascist militia, the Arditi del Popolo. Founded on the initiative of Argo Secondari and anarchist and republican groups, the movement rapidly spreads in Liguria, Emilia, Tuscany, Umbria and Lazio. The Arditi are not supported by the socialist parties (neither by the Italian Socialist Party, PSI, nor by the Communist Party of Italy, PCI).
- July 21 – In Sarzana Fascist squads occupy the station and five or six hundred are preparing to enter the city to impose the release of a dozen arrested fascists, but are attacked by the Carabinieri and the population resulting in eighteen dead and about thirty injured fascists (Fatti di Sarzana).

=== August ===
- August 2 – Pact of Pacification between Benito Mussolini and his Fasci Italiani di Combattimento, and the Italian Socialist Party (PSI) and the General Confederation of Labor (CGL). The agreement was short-lived since many of the fascist squadristi leaders denounced the pacification pact with the socialists, along with Mussolini's leadership, arguing that the Duce “had not created the movement” and that they could “get along without him.”
- August 18 – In Il Popolo d'Italia Mussolini announces his resignation from the executive board of the Fascists because of the resistance to the pacification pact.
- August 26 – The Fascist National Council rejects Mussolini's resignation from the executive board. With regard to the pacification pact, the council does not impose a precise line and leaves the issue to be resolved autonomously by individual squads.

=== November ===
- November 9 – The National Fascist Party (Italian: Partito Nazionale Fascista, PNF) is founded during the Third Fascist Congress in Rome on November 7–10, 1921. The National Fascist Party marked the transformation of the paramilitary Fasci Italiani di Combattimento into a more coherent political group. Mussolini agrees under pressure of the provincial chieftains to "disavow" what some called "the Appeasement Pact", referring to the Pacification Pact.
- November 15 – Mussolini publicly announces the end of the Pacification Pact in Il Popolo d'Italia.

=== December ===
- December 28 – The Banca Italiana di Sconto goes bust. The bank is granted a moratorium of one year to resolve its financial problems.

== Births ==
- February 3 – Antonio Natali, Italian politician (d. 1991)
- February 22 – Giulietta Masina, Italian actress (d. 1994)
- March 12 – Gianni Agnelli, Italian entrepreneur and principal shareholder of Fiat (d. 2003)
- April 8 – Franco Corelli, Italian opera singer (d. 2003)
- April 17 – Sergio Sollima, Italian director (d. 2015)
- May 12 – Giovanni Benelli, Italian Cardinal who served as the Archbishop of Florence (d. 1982)
- May 31 – Alida Valli, Italian actress who appeared in more than 100 films (d. 2006)
- July 5 – Vito Ortelli, Italian racing cyclist (d. 2017)
- July 24 - Giuseppe Di Stefano, Italian operatic tenor (d. 2008)
- August 15 – Vittorio Caprioli, Italian actor, director and screenwriter (d. 1989)
- August 23 – Franco Ossola, Italian footballer (d. 1949)
- August 25 – Cesare Terranova, Italian judge and politician from Sicily killed by the Mafia (d. 1979)
- September 14 – Dario Vittori, Italian-born Argentine actor (d. 2001)
- October 4 - Gianni Poggi, operatic tenor (d. 1989)
- November 23 – Fred Buscaglione, Italian singer and actor (d. 1960)
- December 18 – Renato Baldini, Italian actor (d. 1995)

== Deaths ==
- February 2 – Andrea Carlo Ferrari, Italian cardinal who served as the Archbishop of Milan (b. 1850)
- March 16 – Olinto De Pretto, Italian industrialist and geologist (b. 1857)
- August 2 – Enrico Caruso, Italian operatic tenor (b. 1873)
