= Mario Gordesco =

Italian aviator (1884–1920

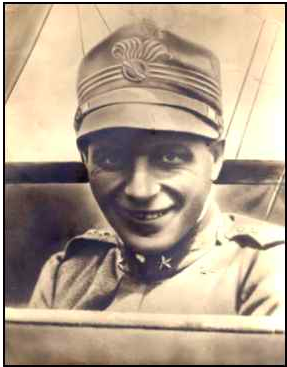
- Born: 12 December 1884; Arcola, Liguria, Italy
- Died: 13 April 1920 (aged 35); Bushehr, Bushehr Province, Persia
- Burial place: Arcola Cemetery, Liguria, Italy
- Military career
- Allegiance: Italy
- Branch: Royal Italian Army; Regia Aeronautica
- Service years: 1911 – 1920
- Rank: Capitano
- Commands: 17th Stormo Incursori
- Conflicts: Italo-Turkish War; World War I: Senussi Campaign

Mario Ugo Gordesco was an Italian captain and aviator of the Regia Aeronautica during World War I. He is considered to be a pioneer within Italian aviation and was a major figure within the early Regia Aeronautica.

== Beginnings ==
Mario was born at Arcola, Liguria on 12 December 1884, son of Amos and Alberta Putti. Having completed his military service in the Royal Italian Army in the early 1900s, he left Italy for Paris at a very young age. Having a passion for cars, he met Fernand and Louis Renault and was hired by the car manufacturers to become a technical director in the workshops. Traveling from aerodromes to aeronautical workshops, he earned a new passion of flight, and in 1911 he obtained his first flying license in France.

Around the same time, General Demetrio Cordero di Montezemolo was looking for suitable people to fill roles in the army's automotive and aeronautical departments and in 1911, Gordesco decided to re-enlist in the Royal Italian Army. In March that year, he obtained the rank of second lieutenant and assigned to the 3rd Bersaglieri Regiment. He took part in the Italo-Turkish War in Libya, where for the first time cars, planes and radio systems were used by the army in war operations .

In May 1912, he returned to Italy and moved to the Aeronautical Service within the then dependent on the Arma del Genio, attending the Caproni School in Somma Lombardo where he obtained his pilot's license. In October 1912 at Vizzola Ticino, while testing a Caproni apparatus, he was involved in an accident in which he injured his head while the chief engineer of the school, Francesco Piccoli, fell victim. He became director of the Vizzola Ticino aerodrome and in 1914 went to Libya where thanks to his technical and organizational qualities, was able to make the most out of the few available aircraft. He then obtained his military pilot license at the Aviano airfield on 14 June 1914.

On 6 July 1914, he inaugurated the Military Aviation School in the new Comina field along with other airmen from the Aviano school, performing brilliant demonstration flights and was made Captain in July 1914. He became a fighter aircraft instructor at the San Giusto School in Coltano, the Malpensa School and the Cascina Costa Aviation Training Camp in Samarate where he had the opportunity to teach many future aviation aces to fly on Italian fighter planes.

== World War I ==
When there weren't any school camps available to teach, on 18 August 1916, he volunteered in the 75th Fighter Squadron as part of the III group (later the 3rd Land Fighter Group) on the Verona-Tombetta Airfield with the task of air defense of Verona. He made numerous reconnaissance and escort flights around this time. He was recorded as having such a magnanimous temperament that one day in Verona, while returning from an escort at the limits of autonomy, he preferred to land a bomber, risking both his plane and his life as he managed to only get wounded and landed on some railway carriages.

In January 1917, he moved to the 76th Fighter Squadron as his plane had the inscription of "Due di coppe" which became famous. In March 1917, he became commander of the 80th Hunting Squadron in the field of Santa Maria la Longa within the 1st Group of 3rd Army. He was later transferred to the famous 80th Fighter Squadron which initially specialized in Nieuport 11 aircraft but later on, as a result of criticism from the aeronautical command, Nieuport 17 models adopted the white star on a red field .

On 30 April 1917, Captain Gordesco was transferred, together with the 80th Fighter Squadron and the 77th Airplane Squadron, to the field of Aiello del Friuli where the two squadrons formed XIII Group (later the 13th Fighter Group) under the command of Captain Gordesco who also had the responsibility of commanding the camp. Together with the pilots of the squadrons, a total of 64 servicemen served at the aircraft maintenance and repair shops.

The squadrons of Aiello were very active during the Tenth Battle of the Isonzo and Captain Gordesco was commended by the Duke of Aosta, commander of the 3rd Army on 13 June 1917, as he said:

Commander of the Aiello field, during the offensive of May 1917, his admirable sense of duty was able with such exquisite and personal example, to instill in his employees, so that the two hunting squadrons were fulfilled with fervent enthusiasm and loving constancy a job serious of danger and profitable of precious return.

On 18 June, at Santa Maria la Longa, the annual Bersaglieri festival took place and Gabriele D'Annunzio was invited to speak. During his speech, he spoke of Gordesco, describing him as "not a Gordesca cow, but early and restless". Gordesco replied to the joke by spilling a whole bucket of water on D'Annunzio's head, staining the high collar of the jacket that the Poet calls a collar. Gabriele bursted out laughing and then continued his speech undeterred.

On 20 August 1917, Gordesco shot down an enemy plane at Komen and it was on the same day that Gabriele D'Annunzio was forced to land three times at the Aiello airfield to repair his bomber. Beginning in September 1917, the 84th Squadron was also added to Aiello and despite the largely obsolete and inadequate air assets, numerous escort and reconnaissance flights were carried out and many victories were obtained without any losses. However, after the disastrous Battle of Caporetto, Gordesco was the only commander who served with two squadrons for the entire 3rd Army, day, night and in any weather condition in order to protect the infantry.

Orders were given to vacate the camp on 24 October 1917, and the following day, and it was burned and abandoned on 27 October. The 84th Squadriglia abandoned the obsolete Nieuport 11 aircraft and was forced to destroy two Neiport 17 and one SPAD S.VILL which weren't even assembled yet. On 3 November 1917, the squadrons had withdrawn to Comina before retreating to the Campo di aviazione di Arcade and finally to Marcon, near Mestre.

Gordesco commanded the Camp of Marcon in great harmony with all his men until March 1918, when he left the camp to assume command of the Hunting School of Furbara, a hamlet of Cerveteri and home to one of the oldest airports in Italy. Gordesco then became the Chief Instructor of the Acrobatic School in June 1918. He trained numerous pilots from prestigious American universities which were known as the "famous hunters of the air" who later made their mark on the French battlefields of World War I.

Gordesco continued teaching in the training camps and was commander of the first acrobatic school and for this he was remembered by Gabriele D'Annunzio in his speech to the aviators of Centocelle on 9 July 1919, as he stated: “Are there none of you who remember this? Captain Gordesco very elegantly instructs the jugglers of the air in Cerveteri ”.

After participating in the Senussi Campaign and following a position as a flight instructor at the schools of San Giusto and Malpensa, in 1916 he directly took action in World War I, initially with the 75th Fighter Squadron and then with the 80th Hunter Squadron. Equipped with the Nieuport XI, he commanded the Squadron and distinguished himself on the Isonzo line to provide support to the line units. The 80th lost five aircraft during the retreat from Caporetto. During the following summer, it was transferred to the Furbara Airport where Gordesco became the Chief Instructor in June 1918. Among his students were also American pilots serving on the European fronts. [4] .

== Rome-Tokyo Raid and Death ==
After World War I concluded, he was involved in the Rome-Tokyo Raid in 1920 by Gabriele D'Annunzio. On 11 March 1920, a squadron of 5 Ansaldo SVA 9 took off from the Centocelle Airport. The crews are made up of pilot Lieutenant Giuseppe Grassa, with Captain Mario Gordesco commander of the squadron; pilot Captain Umberto Re, with operator Bixio Alberini; pilot Captain Ferruccio Ranza, with engineer Brigidi; pilot Lieutenant Amedeo Mecozzi with Lieutenant Bruno Bilisco reserve pilot and pilot Lieutenant Ferruccio Marzari with engineer Giuseppe Damonte.

The squadron must meet in Calcutta with the SVAs of Lt. Arturo Ferrarin and Guido Masiero who departed from the Centocelle airport on Saturday 14 February at 11.

He moved to the Gioia del Colle Airport in order to study maps, flight possibilities, new plans. The weather conditions were very bad and showed no signs of changing: he got in touch with Captain Pastore in Brindisi where he remained blocked for five long days, then the big decision: we had to overcome the adverse weather: we flew to Athens in prohibitive conditions: wind, thunderstorms, low clouds, rain.

Once landed, Gordesco impresses even King Constantine I of Greece with his squadron, the celebrations begin but soon he has to leave again for the second stage: he does not fully know the weather conditions, he trusts them even if the organizers are unable to report anything by English stations in Calcutta . There's more, the Arabs shoot down a plane with his comrades Ferruccio Ranza and Marzari, Gordesco manages to pass but on the border with Persia, in Bushehrdied: it was 13 April 1920. After a failed landing, in the angry go-around the plane crashed and destroyed itself near the French embassy on the edge of the runway (the Reuters agency reported the date of the incident as 11 April 1920, unlike other sources reporting 13 April 1920).

Arturo Ferrarin, the only driver to complete the Raid Roma Tokio, recalls Mario Gordesco and Giuseppe Grassa: "In Buscir… an engine breakdown… they slammed into a house… both died… The stage officer is gone, and left me here, alone with my pain.I cannot unite in my thoughts the two living figures of Grassa and Gordesco, illuminated by the sun, precise in my memory, with that great sad house of Buscir, without feeling an impression of agony, like a laceration to the brain."

The two pilots Captain Gordesco and pilot lieutenant Giuseppe Grassa perish. The body was initially buried by Ferruccio Ranza in Bushehr.

On 15 April 1920, the fortnightly magazine Aerogazzetta, at the end of the substantial front-page article on Capt. Gordesco, concludes:

We know that on the initiative of some friends of the late Captain Gordesco, the proposal will be made to the Directorate General of Aeronautics to name the Cerveteri field "Mario Gordesco" which saw all his daring and the marvelous tireless work of instructor and commander. For our part, we give complete and enthusiastic support.

== Funeral and legacy ==
In April 1922, the Calabria left from Taranto for Yokohama, its landing department heading to provide assistance to the population of Tokyo hit by an earthquake. While on his return on 23 May 1924, while passing through the Persian Gulf, the Calabria recovered the bodies of Capt. Gordesco and Lt. Grassa and brought them back to Italy where Gordesco's funeral was arranged on 24 August. The Municipal Council of Arcola and the entire population bestowed honors and triumphs on him. The square and the street along which the paternal house is located are named after him. Capt. Gordesco is currently buried at the Arcola Cemetery in a chapel.

Currently, the Furbara Airport is named after Gordesco.

== Awards ==
- Silver Medal of Military Valor
- Bronze Medal of Military Valor
- Order of the Crown of Italy, Knight
- Commemorative Medal for the Italo-Austrian War 1915–1918
- Commemorative Medal of the Unity of Italy (Vittorio Emanuele III)
- Allied Victory Medal

=== Foreign Awards ===
- Japan: Order of the Rising Sun, 2nd Class
