= Gino Scarpa =

Norwegian painter and sculptor (1924–2022)

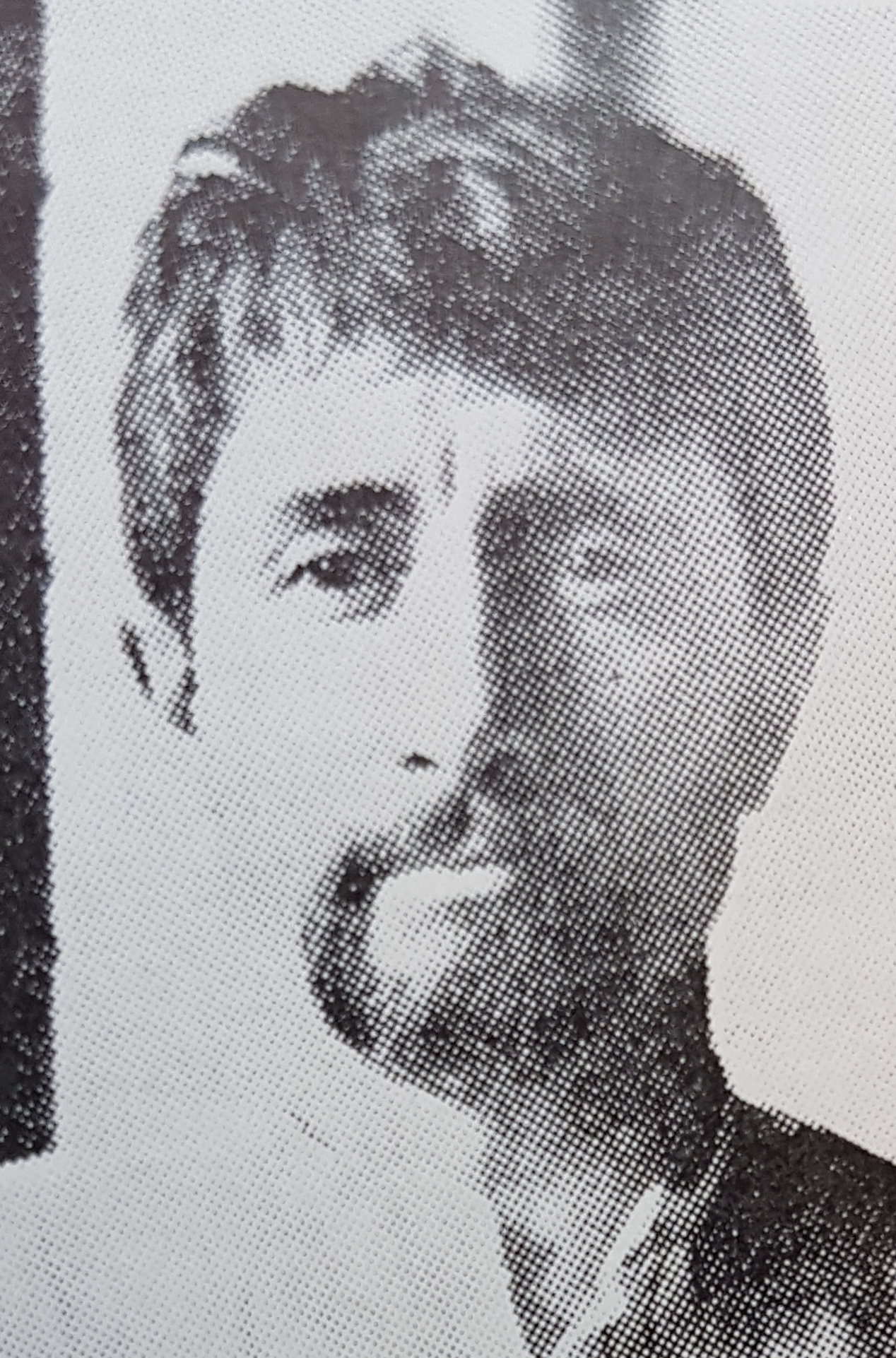
- Born: 8 November 1924; Venice, Italy
- Died: 4 December 2022 (aged 98); Oslo, Norway
- Occupations: Painter, printmaker and sculptor

Gino Scarpa (8 November 1924 – 4 December 2022) was an Italian-born Norwegian painter, printmaker, sculptor and mountaineer.

Scarpa was born in Venice, where he also grew up, to inspector Silvio Scarpa and Linda Gaggio. He studied architecture in Venice, and printmaking in Malmö. He worked several years as mountain guide in the Dolomites, until he moved to Copenhagen in 1958, where he established himself as a full-time artist. He moved to Oslo in 1970, and became a Norwegian citizen in 1978. He is represented in the National Gallery of Norway with the painting Daggry from 1978, as well as prints. He is represented in the Norwegian Museum of Contemporary Art in Oslo with the sculptures Signum (1972) and Bølge (1973).

Scarpa died in Oslo on 4 December 2022, aged 98.
