= Alda Grimaldi =

Italian director and actress (1919–2023)

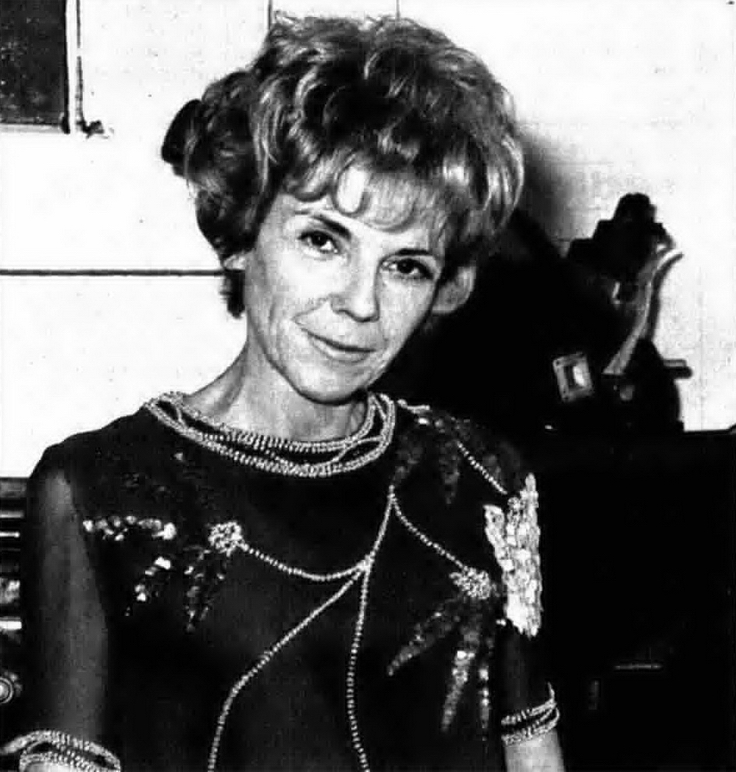
- Grimaldi in 1969
- Born: 6 October 1919; Sampierdarena, Italy
- Died: 28 December 2023 (aged 104)
- Occupation(s): Director and actress

Alda Grimaldi (6 October 1919 – 28 December 2023), known as Dada, was an Italian director and actress who was active from the 1940s to the 1960s.

== Biography ==
Grimaldi was born in Sampierdarena in 1919. She began her acting career in Turin at the Fert Studio in the 1940s.

In 1955, Grimaldi sterted working at RAI. The same year, she won a scholarship to attend a directing course at the Centro Sperimentale di Cinematografia in Rome.

Grimaldi was among the first women to work as a television director in the state television corporation in the early days of regular broadcasting. She directed, among other things, an episode of the 1958 didactic-theatrical program Il teatro dei ragazzi.

In 1957, she was awarded the Saint-Vincent Prize for Journalism.

She died on 28 December 2023, at the age of 104.

== Personal life ==
Grimaldi was married to the Turin doctor Giovanni Rubino, who died in 1997.
