= Harukichi Shimoi =

Japanese poet and writer (1883–1954)

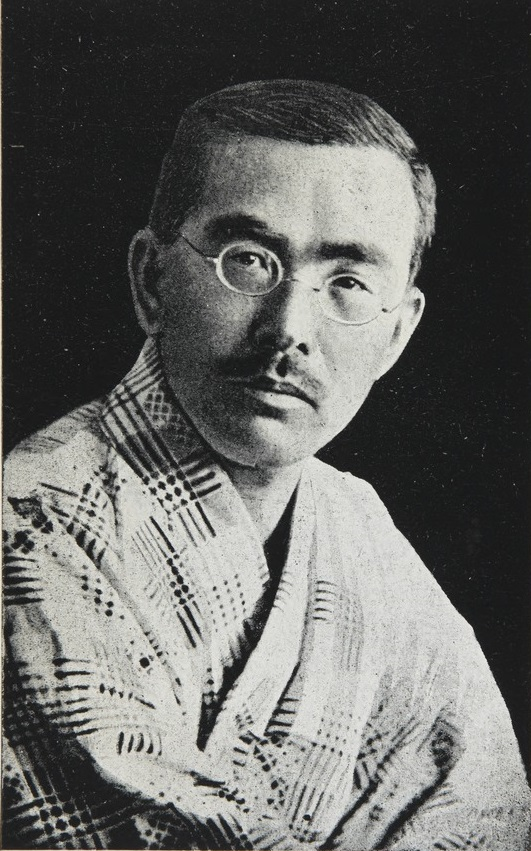
- Born: Harukichi Inoue (井上 春吉); 20 October 1883; Fukuoka, Empire of Japan
- Died: 1 December 1954 (aged 71)
- Occupations: Writer, translator, professor
- Writing career
- Language: Japanese, Italian
- Notable work: La guerra italiana vista da un giapponese

Harukichi Shimoi (下位 春吉, Shimoi Harukichi; October 20, 1883 – December 1, 1954) was a Japanese poet, translator and writer. Shimoi lived in Italy for many years and was an important promoter of cultural exchange between Japan and Italy.

Shimoi translated works from Yosano Akiko and Matsuo Bashō into Italian, and conversely translated Dante into Japanese. Shimoi was close friends with Gabriele D'Annunzio and translated several of his works. He accompanied the poet on his Fiume endeavour.

He was influential in introducing the haiku to Italian futurist poets, organizing the Tokyo-Rome flight with Arturo Ferrarin, his early involvement in the Calpis soft drink, and promoting Karate and Judo to Italians.

== Biography ==
Born in Fukuoka as Harukichi Inoue (井上 春吉, Inoue Harukichi), he later adopted the surname of his wife when they married in 1907. He finished his studies in Japan, and had the occasion to meet Bin Ueda, by whom he was profoundly influenced. Shimoi then moved to Italy to study Dante, becoming a Japanese teacher at the Naples Eastern University.

In 1917, he enlisted in the Italian army during World War I, and committed himself to fighting against the Central Powers. Harukichi became an Ardito, teaching his fellow soldiers karate.

Using his diplomatic passport that allowed him great freedom of movement, Shimoi acted after the war as a liaison for messages between Gabriele D'Annunzio, then regent of Fiume, and Benito Mussolini, at the time the head of the Italian Fasci di Combattimento and editor of Il Popolo d'Italia. Shimoi was, among other things, one of the people first entering the Fiume Endeavour of the Italian poet. D'Annunzio nicknamed Shimoi "comrade Samurai" and "the Samurai of Fiume". Together they promoted and organized the Rome-Tokyo Raid performed by the aviator Arturo Ferrarin.

Returning to Naples in 1920, he founded the Japanese literature magazine Sakura, that would be published until March of the following year for a total of five issues. In 1934 he served as an interpreter to the founder of Judo, Jigoro Kano, while he was staying in Italy. The translated interviews given by Kano were a mainspring for the development of the discipline in Italy.

Shimoi with a portrait of Mussolini in the early 1920s

Getting back to his homeland, Shimoi helped the Italian Embassy in Tokyo to stop the pro-Ethiopian activities of the Japanese rightist clubs during the war in Ethiopia. Shimoi was one of the best known Japanese supporters of Italian fascism, seeing some analogies between the fascist principles and the traditional values of Japanese culture, especially the Bushido. He argued that fascism was a natural ramification of the risorgimento, and that its role was to be a "spiritual movement" that would make Italians identify as being part of the new nation. While being a supporter of fascism in Italy, Shimoi didn't ever promote it in Japan, considering such a movement a uniquely Italian cultural phenomenon.

After the second World War, Shimoi met and became friends with Indro Montanelli, who arrived in Japan to work on a series of reportages. Shimoi became his guide around the country.

== Literary work ==
Shimoi translated numerous works from Japanese into Italian and vice versa. He translated works by a number of Japanese authors like Akiko Yosano and Matsuo Bashō, while his translations into Japanese included D'Annunzio and Dante. In 1920, Shimoi even promoted the construction of a temple dedicated to Dante in Tokyo. Some of his works include Shito Ponpei o otonau tame ni (死都ポンペイを訪ふために, "To visit the ghost town of Pompeii") (1926) and La guerra italiana vista da un giapponese ("The Italian war as seen by a Japanese") (1919).

'La guerra italiana vista da un giapponese' was translated to English in 2019 as 'The Italian Front as Seen by a Japanese Samurai'. It is framed as a series of letters between Harukichi Shimoi and his friends, in particular the Buddhist senator Giuseppe de Lorenzo. It also contains an introductory dedication by Gabriele D'Annunzio.
