= Rome–Tokyo Raid =

Route of Arturo Ferrarin’s journey Rome-Tokyo

The Rome–Tokyo Raid (Italian: Raid Roma-Tokyo) was an Italian long-distance air expedition across Eurasia between 14 February and 31 May 1920. It was organised by Gabriele D'Annunzio and Harukichi Shimoi and completed by the aviators Guido Masiero and Arturo Ferrarin together with their respective engineers Roberto Maretto and Gino Capannini.

== Origin of the idea ==
Gabriele D'Annunzio conceived the idea of the Rome–Tokyo Raid (Note: The Italian word raid is borrowed from English, and still carries some of the obsolete English sense of an expedition. See Wiktionary, for the Italian word, and follow links from there. (The English word is cognate with Eng. ride.)) in March 1919: it was born from his meeting during the First World War with the Japanese poet Harukichi Shimoi, who had enlisted in the Arditi. D’Annunzio, a veteran of the Flight over Vienna, originally intended to undertake the expedition himself and for this reason he was helped and supported by the Italian government, which saw it as a possible means of distracting him from the Fiume adventure.

As it turned out, D'Annunzio, was not distracted from Fiume and gave up the idea of flying himself. Although this plan involved eleven aircraft, only Ferrarin, with his engineer Gino Cappannini, was ultimately able to reach the Japanese capital purely by flying, totalling 112 flying hours. Masiero and Maretto travelled the section between Delhi and Calcutta by train and the one between Guangzhou and Shanghai by ship. All the other crews failed to complete the journey and one aircraft even crashed, killing its two crew members.

== Crew ==
The officers, non-commissioned officers and soldiers chosen by D'Annunzio were:

- Lieutenant Edoardo Scavini, second lieutenant Carlo Bonalumi, Caproni Ca.33 biplane
- Lieutenant Luigi Garrone, Lieutenant Enrico Abba, engineers Alfredo Momo and Alfredo Rossi, Caproni Ca.40 triplane
- Lieutenant Leandro Negrini, second lieutenant Giovanni Origgi, engineer Dario Cotti, Caproni Ca.33 biplane
- Lieutenant Virgilio Sala, Lieutenant Innocente Borello, engineer Antonio Sanità, Caproni Ca.44 biplane
- Lieutenant Guido Masiero, engineer Roberto Maretto, Ansaldo SVA 9 biplane
- Lieutenant Arturo Ferrarin, engineer Gino Cappannini, Ansaldo SVA 9 biplane
- Pilot Lieutenant Giuseppe Grassa, Captain Mario Gordesco, Ansaldo SVA 9 biplane
- Captain Umberto Re, cinematographer Bixio Alberini, Ansaldo SVA 9 biplane
- Captain Ferruccio Ranza, engineer Brigidi, Ansaldo SVA 9 biplane
- Lieutenant Amedeo Mecozzi, Lieutenant Bruno Bilisco, Ansaldo SVA 9 biplane
- Lieutenant Ferruccio Marwari, engineer Giuseppe Da Monte, Ansaldo SVA 9 biplane

== The expedition: Italy to India ==
Ferrarin and Masiero set off on 14 February 1920 at 11 from Centocelle airport in Rome. Their first stop was at Gioia del Colle, Puglia, as both aircraft were experiencing technical problems. The next stop was at Vlora, in Albania, where there were still Italian troops who had been occupying the city since 1914. After Vlora they stopped at Thessaloniki and from there they moved İzmir, at that time occupied by the Greeks.

From İzmir they headed for Antalya but technical problems forced them to make a landing at Aydın. They flew to Antalya, then occupied by the Italians, then on to Aleppo and Baghdad. In the Iraqi capital Ferrarin was forced to land on a field where a soccer match was taking place. On 23 February they left for Basra, where Ferrarin waited for Masiero for three days before resuming the flight for Bandar Abbas, though he was interrupted by bad weather which forced him to land at Bushehr. Finally reaching Bandar Abbas, after a first failed attempt due to a problem with his radiator, Ferrarin eventually managed to reach Chabahar.

== The expedition: India to China ==
From there Ferrarin wanted to reach Karachi directly but, due to an engine problem, he was forced to land near a village inhabited by rebels who opposed British rule. Luckily the villagers mistook the Italian tricolor for the flag of Bulgaria, an enemy of Britain during the First World War. Taking advantage of this mistake, Ferrarin managed to leave the village unharmed and resume his journey towards Karachi. There Ferrarin rejoined Masiero who had managed to fly directly from Bandar Abbas.

From Karachi Ferrarin left for Delhi, which he reached after a stop in Hyderabad and a short stop at a railway station. He then arrived in Allahabad and from there reached Kolkata. After a long stop in there, waiting in vain for his other companions, Ferrarin resumed his flight in the direction of Akyab (one source states that he was flying a new plane, since his original one had been irreparably damaged by the carelessness of the local staff) and from there reached Yangon, the last staging post under British control - for the Baghdad to Burma stretch, the British authorities had given the pilots full support, providing help for repairs and guidance on routing.

Masiero reached Yangon first, and Ferrarin then set off to follow him by way of Bangkok, Ubon Ratchathani and Hanoi, where he caught up with him. On 21 April Ferrarin set off again. He made two short landings, the first on a small island in the South China Sea and the second near Macao, before reaching Guangzhou. From there he proceeded to Fuzhou and then Shanghai.

== The expedition: China to Japan ==
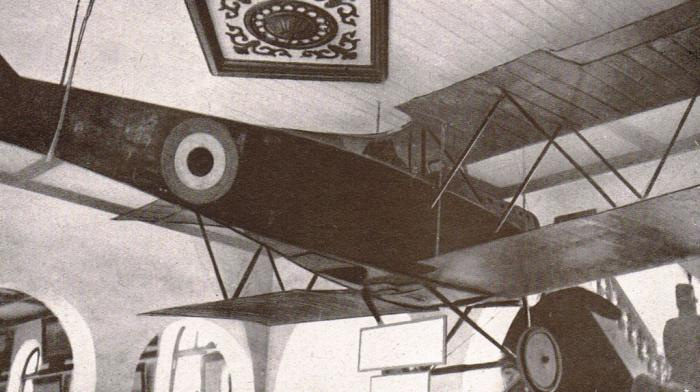
The aircraft used by Ferrarin for the raid, exhibited in the Japanese Imperial Museum

From Shanghai, where he stopped for a week, he went in to Qingdao, which was then occupied by Japanese forces. Welcomed by the Japanese authorities, he was promised that when he arrived in Japan he would be presented with a golden samurai katana and that his plane would remain on display in Tokyo. It was in fact exhibited until 1933, but them destroyed due to irreparable deterioration.

From Qingdao he reached the Chinese capital Beijing, where he spent a week, honored by the local population and authorities, then he left again for Goubangzi, near Shenyang then for Sinŭiju in Korea, at that time an integral part of the Japanese empire.

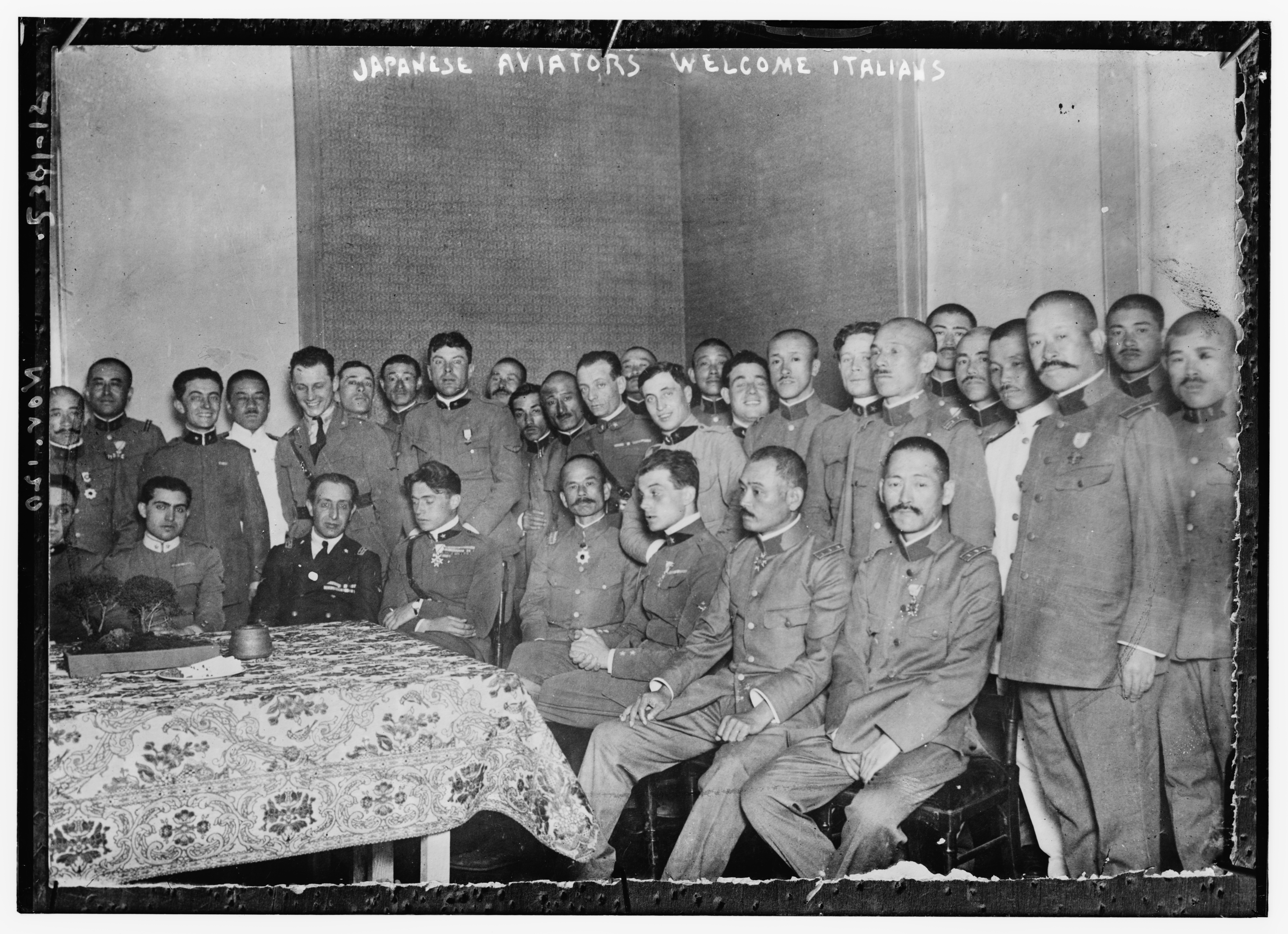
Japanese aviators welcome Italians LCCN2014719605

The next stop on the journey was Seoul, a destination imposed on Ferrarin by both the Japanese authorities and the Italian representatives in Korea. From Seoul he headed to Daegu, which was the last stop on mainland soil. On orders from the Japanese authorities, Ferrarin was forced to follow a longer and more northern route than the one he envisaged because there was an absolute ban on flying over the strongholds of Pusan and Tsushima. Despite the imposed change of course, Ferrarin reached Osaka on May 30, where he was welcomed by the entire citizenry.

Landing in Yoyogi Park, Ferrarin reached the last leg of the journey, Tokyo where, in addition to the usual crowds that had met him at all his stops since he arrived in China, he had the honor of being received by the royal prince Hirohito and by Empress Teimei.

Ferrarin went on to publish his travel memoirs in the book My Flight Rome-Tokyo in 1921.

== The other crews ==
A total of eleven aircraft and their crews attempted to journey, but only the planes of Arturo Ferrarin and Guido Masiero reached Japan. The other crews ran into accidents, even fatal ones, which prevented them from reaching Tokyo .

The first crew to drop out were Abba and Garrone, who lost their plane in Thessalonika. Sala and Borello’s Caproni had a breakdown along the course of the Meander while Origgi and Negrini ended their journey in Konya: they were captured on September 2 and their aircraft destroyed. In the Syrian desert it was the turn of Scavini and Bonalumi, aboard a Caproni trimotor, to abandon the enterprise.

The most serious accident of the raid took place in Bushehr as Gordesco and Grassa had a fatal accident: their plane, an SVA9 like that of Masiero and Ferrarin, broke down on take-off and, after catching fire, it crashed. In Japan, the Empress Teimei decreed that funeral rites should be conducted in their honor at a temple in Tokyo, in the presence of the Italian pilots who had arrived safely.

== Criticism ==
Despite the success of the enterprise, the raid was criticized in Italy. Left-wing parties, while recognizing the value of what Ferrarin had accomplished, challenged the excessive spending of public money and the sloppy organization.

== Legacy ==
In 2020, for the centenary of the raid, the Italian Air Force dedicated a special livery sported by five SIAI S.208Ms of the 60th Wing of Guidonia, with the image of Arturo Ferrarin on the tail and a cockade with the Italian and Japanese colors.

The same year, a documentary was made by the municipality of Cadoneghe, particularly focused on Roberto Maretto, a native of the place. In June 2021, celebrations were held in Cadoneghe with many activities in memory of the Raid.
