= Ezio Barbieri =

Italian criminal (1922–2018)

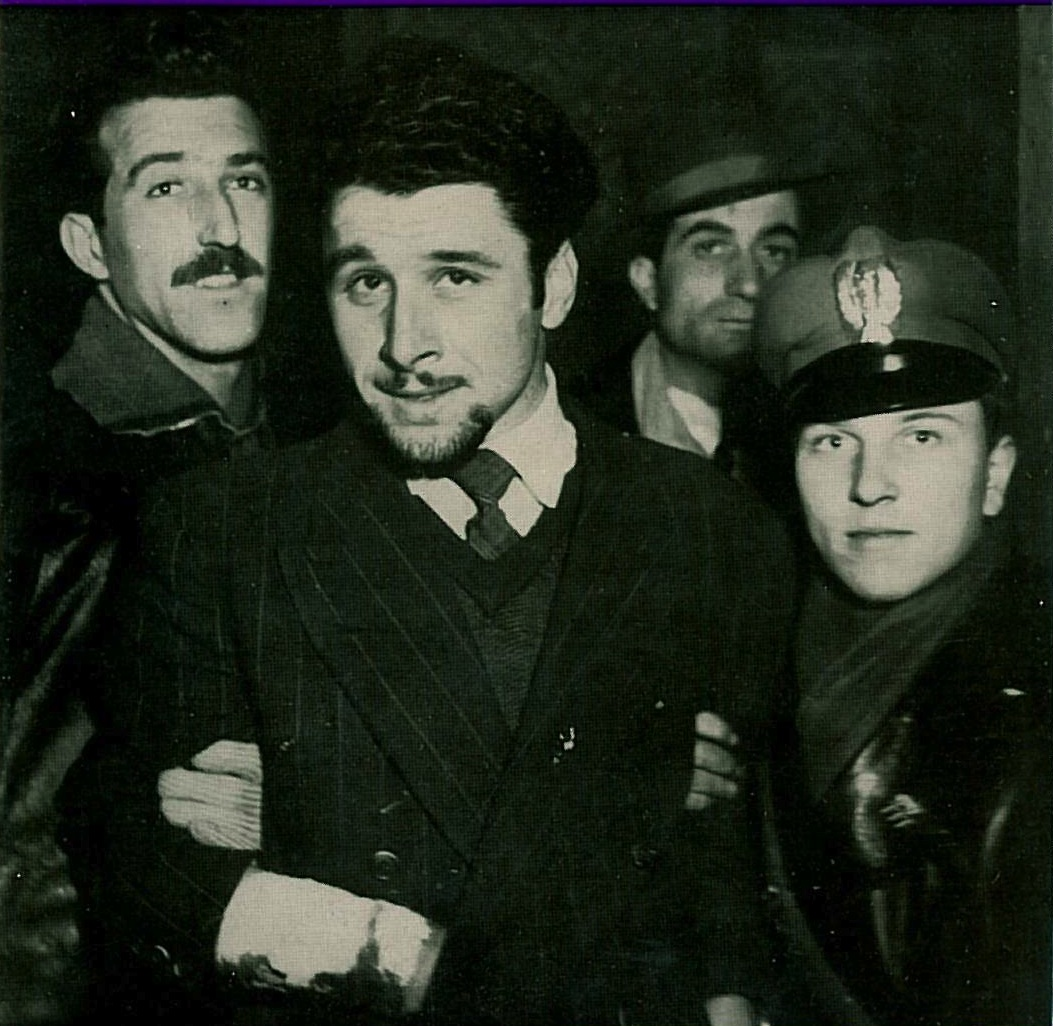
- The bandit Ezio Barbieri captured by Italian police
- Born: 1 November 1922; Milan, Kingdom of Italy
- Died: 17 May 2018 (aged 95); Barcellona Pozzo di Gotto, Italy
- Occupation: Crime boss

Ezio Barbieri (1 November 1922 – 17 May 2018) was an Italian criminal.

== Biography ==
Born and raised in Pietro Borsieri street in Milan, at the Isola neighborhood, once known to be populated by exponents of ligera, the traditional Milanese underworld, Ezio Barbieri is known for being a famous robber of the immediate post-war period, the head of the "band of the black Aprilia".

On board of a Lancia 777, the number of the police Milanese switchboard, Ezio Barbieri and his band formed impromptu roadblocks, robbing passers-by, robbing banks or organizing large scale raids on black market traders. The raids often ended with the redistribution of the loot among the poor people of the neighborhood with which there was the omertà on the real identity of the members of the band.

After numerous arrests and evasions, he was finally captured on the evening of 26 February 1946 at the Torrazza farmhouse in Milan, and on that same day his friend and accomplice Sandro Bezzi was killed by the police between Morandi street and Bolzano street. After having tried in vain other evasions, Ezio Barbieri was involved in spite of himself in the biggest post-war prison revolt, the so-called Red Easter of Milan's San Vittore Prison, which exploded on April 21, 1946 and sedated four days later, from which the writer Alberto Bevilacqua has drawn the novel The Red Easter in which Barbieri is one of the protagonists

Sentenced to 30 years of hard prison, Ezio Barbieri was released in 1971 and moved to Barcellona Pozzo di Gotto, in Sicily, working as a wine and clothing merchant.
