= 2024 in Italy =

- Decades: 2000s; 2010s; 2020s; 2030s
- See also: History of Italy; Timeline of Italian history; List of years in Italy

Events during the year 2024 in Italy.

== Incumbents ==
- President – Sergio Mattarella
- President of the Senate of the Republic – Ignazio La Russa
- President of the Chamber of Deputies – Lorenzo Fontana
- Prime Minister – Giorgia Meloni
- President of the Constitutional Court – Augusto Antonio Barbera

== Events ==
=== January ===
- 7 January – The commemoration of the Acca Larentia killings made by hundreds of neo-fascists at the Italian Social Movement's former headquarters prompts criticism from the opposition parties of the Meloni government.

=== February ===
- 6–10 February – Sanremo Music Festival 2024
- 16 February – Three workers are killed, three are injured and two are missing after a collapse during the construction of a new supermarket in Florence.
- 25 February – 2024 Sardinian regional election

=== March ===
- 10 March – 2024 Abruzzo regional election
- 16 March – 2024 Milan–San Remo

=== April ===
- 9 April – Four people are killed and two others are injured in an explosion at a dam in Lake Suviana, outside Bologna.
- 21–22 April – 2024 Basilicata regional election

=== May ===
- 4–26 May – 2024 Giro d'Italia
- 6 May – Five workers are killed and another is critically injured while carrying out maintenance work on a wastewater lifting tank in Palermo.
- 7 May – President of Liguria Giovanni Toti is placed under house arrest under accusation of corruption. He resigns from his position on 26 July and is released on 1 August.
- 20 May – A magnitude 4.4 earthquake strikes the Phlegraean Fields near Naples, resulting in hundreds being evacuated.

=== June ===
- 5 June – A court in Florence convicts American journalist Amanda Knox and sentences her to three years' imprisonment over slander charges related to the murder of Meredith Kercher in Perugia in 2007.
- 7–12 June – 2024 European Athletics Championships
- 8–9 June – 2024 Italian local elections
- 9 June
  - 2024 European Parliament election in Italy: The Brothers of Italy party led by Prime Minister Giorgia Meloni emerges as the largest party in the Italian contingent to the European Parliament.
  - 2024 Piedmontese regional election
- 12 June – A brawl breaks out in the Chamber of Deputies during a vote on proposals to strengthen regional autonomy, resulting in injuries to M5S deputy Leonardo Donno.
- 14 June – Anti-fascist activist Ilaria Salis is released from detention in Hungary after gaining legal immunity as an MEP-elect in the European Parliament election on 9 June.
- 17 June – Eleven migrants are killed and 64 others are reported missing following sinkings involving two separate vessels off the southern Italian coast.
- 19 June
  - The European Commission reprimands Belgium, France, Hungary, Italy, Malta, Poland, and Slovakia for breaking budget rules.
  - The Italian Parliament passes a law granting more autonomy to the country's regions following a night of debate. The opposition Democratic Party and former Prime Minister Matteo Renzi express opposition to the bill, with the latter launching a campaign to force a referendum.
- 21 June – Eight workers are critically injured during an explosion at a factory in Bolzano.
- 29 June–21 July: 2024 Tour de France

=== July ===
- 5 July – Mount Etna and Mount Stromboli erupt, forcing a temporary closure of Catania–Fontanarossa Airport in Sicily.
- 13 July – Thirty-three Indian farm workers in Verona Province are rescued by the Guardia di Finanza following reports of "slave-like" working conditions, with two other Indian nationals arrested and charged with labour violations.
- 17 July
  - Two firefighters are killed in a wildfire in Basilicata.
  - Authorities place 13 cities throughout the Italian Peninsula under rare severe heat warnings due to predicted heat indexes reaching as high as 44 °C (111.2 °F) throughout the week.
  - Archaeologists unearth remains of a medieval papal palace in the square outside the Archbasilica of Saint John Lateran in Rome.
- 18 July – A court convicts journalist Giulia Cortese for "body shaming" Prime Minister Giorgia Meloni on social media and sentences her to pay €5,000 in damages.
- 23 July – Two people are killed while 12 others are injured after a walkway collapses at a housing complex in Naples.
- 26 July – Italy appoints an ambassador to Syria after 12 years, becoming the first G7 country to do so since the Syrian Civil War.
- 27 July – The Appian Way is designated as a World Heritage Site by UNESCO.

=== August ===
- 19 August – The luxury yacht Bayesian sinks in a heavy storm off the coast of Porticello, Sicily, leaving seven people dead, including British tech entrepreneur Mike Lynch. Fifteen people are rescued.

=== September ===
- 4 September – Seven people are rescued and at least 21 others remain missing after a boat carrying Syrian migrants from Libya capsizes off the coast of Lampedusa in the Pelagian Islands.
- 5 September – One person is reported missing following floods near Turin.
- 6 September – Culture minister Gennaro Sangiuliano resigns after admitting to having an affair with a ministry consultant and is replaced by Alessandro Giuli.
- 11 September – Canadian authorities announce the recovery of The Roaring Lion, a 1941 photographic portrait of Winston Churchill by Yousuf Karsh that was stolen from the Fairmont Château Laurier Hotel in Ottawa between 2021-2022, in Italy, where it had been sold at an auction.
- 12 September – Three Chinese nationals are killed in a suspected arson attack on a shop in Milan.
- 13 September – The Guardia di Finanza carries out a major operation against video game piracy involving 47 million euros worth of games from the 1980s and 1990s installed on unauthorized consoles and plagiarism of the originals, leading to the dismantling of shops and suppliers in Turin, Naples, and Bari.
- 21 September – A 65-year old Greek-Australian dual national is arrested at Rome Fiumicino Airport on suspicion of carrying out the Easey Street murders in Melbourne, Australia in 1977.
- 22 September – Three people are killed, three others are injured, and one person is reported missing after a two-story building collapses in Naples.
- 25 September – Three people are killed and three others are injured in a shooting spree in Nuoro. The perpetrator kills himself.
- 27 September – Switzerland officially redefines parts of its border with Italy following topographical changes caused by melting glaciers.
- 30 September – Nineteen people are arrested by police following nationwide raids on suspicion of involvement with the 'Ndrangheta, including the leaders of the respective ultras of Inter Milan and AC Milan.

=== October ===
- 3 October – 184 people are evacuated from Ryanair Flight FR8826, a Boeing 737-800 after it caught fire after a no.2 engine surge at Brindisi Airport while taxiing the runway.
- 7 October – Football player Marco Curto is given a 10-match ban by FIFA, with five them of them suspended, for racially abusing South Korean player Hwang Hee-chan in a pre-season friendly.
- 10 October – Minister of Defence Guido Crosetto affirms that attacks made by the Israel Defense Forces against UNIFIL bases in southern Lebanon, in which many Italian peacekeepers work, might be qualified as a "possible war crime".
- 14 October – Italy initiates the transfer of migrants to Albania under a new agreement.
- 16 October – The Senate votes 84-58 in favor of extending a ban on surrogacy to couples who go abroad to avail of the procedure.
- 18 October – A court in Italy orders a halt to the government's policy of sending migrants to Albania, citing rulings by the European Court of Justice regarding the safety of repatriating migrants to their countries of origin.
- 20 October
  - One person is killed during flooding caused by heavy rains in Botteghino di Zocca (frazione of Pianoro, Emilia-Romagna).
  - Missionary Giuseppe Allamano and nun Elena Guerra are canonized as saints of the Roman Catholic Church by Pope Francis.
- 21 October – The government removes Cameroon, Colombia and Nigeria from its list of countries deemed safe to return migrants to in response to legal challenges.
- 27–28 October – 2024 Ligurian regional election
- 27 October – Authorities announce the arrest of four people as part of an investigation into cyberattacks that targeted law enforcement, tax authorities and other sensitive public data and compromised information regarding 800,000 people as early as 2022 on behalf of a private investigative agency.

=== November ===
- 8 November – A nationwide 24-hour local public transport strike is held following a call by the Italian General Confederation of Labour and other trade unions.
- 17–18 November
  - 2024 Emilia-Romagna regional election
  - 2024 Umbrian regional election
- 19 November – Authorities announce the recovery of Etruscan artifacts valued at 8 million euros ($8.5 million) from an illegal excavation site in Umbria.
- 29 November – A nationwide general strike is held following a call by the Italian General Confederation of Labour and the Italian Labour Union.

=== December ===
- 9 December – Four people are killed in an explosion at an Eni fuel depot in Calenzano, Tuscany.
- 20 December – A court in Palermo acquits deputy prime minister Matteo Salvini of charges relating to the illegal detention of 100 migrants that he refused to disembark from the humanitarian rescue vessel Open Arms that docked in Lampedusa in 2019.
- 24 December – The 2025 Jubilee starts in Rome.
- 27 December – Two climbers are found dead on the Gran Sasso after going missing in a fall on 22 December.

== Holidays ==
- 1 January – New Year's Day
- 6 January – Epiphany
- 31 March – Easter Sunday
- 1 April – Easter Monday
- 25 April – Liberation Day
- 1 May – International Workers' Day
- 2 June – Republic Day
- 15 August – Assumption Day
- 1 November – All Saints' Day
- 8 December – Immaculate Conception
- 25 December – Christmas Day
- 26 December – Saint Stephen's Day

== Art and entertainment ==
- List of 2024 box office number-one films in Italy
- List of Italian films of 2024
- Sanremo Music Festival 2024
- List of Italian submissions for the Academy Award for Best International Feature Film
- 2024 Rome Film Festival

== Deaths ==
=== January ===
- 1 January
  - Giancarlo Filini (it), 85, footballer (Alessandria, Potenza, Pavia).
  - Michele Zolla, 91, government official and politician, deputy (1972–1992).
- 3 January
  - Germana Dominici, 77, actress (Black Sunday, Mi vedrai tornare, Il ragazzo del Pony Express).
  - Mario Crescenzio, 81, politician, senator (1994–2001).
- 4 January – Fabio Fabbri, 90, politician, senator (1976–1994), minister of defence (1993–1994) and European affairs (1986–1987).
- 5 January
  - Giulio Santagata, 74, politician, deputy (2001–2013).
  - Giuseppe Fimognari, 91, politician, senator (1979–1987).
- 6 January
  - Felice Besostri, 79, lawyer and politician, mayor of Borgo San Giovanni (1983–1988) and senator (1996–2001).
  - Francesco Amirante, 90, magistrate, president of the Constitutional Court (2009–2010).
- 7 January
  - Germana Caroli, 92, singer.
  - Alberto Colombo, 77, racing driver.
  - Alessandro Argenton, 86, equestrian, Olympic silver medallist (1972).
- 8 January – Gian Franco Reverberi, 89, composer (Django, Prepare a Coffin, A Black Veil for Lisa, Cry Chicago) and musician.
- 10 January – Fernando Gualtieri (it), 104, painter and footballer (Rimini, Anconitana, Riccione).
- 11 January
  - Tony Iglio, 90, arranger, composer (La pagella) and conductor.
  - Salvatore Mazzarano, 58, footballer (Taranto, Fasano, AC Ancona).
  - Fabio De Felice, 96, politician, deputy (1953–1958).
  - Michele Bonatesta, 81, journalist and politician, senator (1996–2006).
- 13 January – Enzo Moscato, 75, playwright, actor (Libera, The Vesuvians, The Remains of Nothing) and stage director.
- 15 January – Dana Ghia, 91, actress (Seven Deaths in the Cat's Eye, Free Hand for a Tough Cop, California) and singer.
- 16 January
  - Ottavio Dazzan, 66, Argentine-born Italian Olympic cyclist (1980).
  - Sergio Sebastiani, 92, Roman Catholic cardinal, apostolic pro-nuncio to Madagascar (1976–1985) and Turkey (1985–1994), head of the Prefecture for the Economic Affairs of the Holy See (1997–2008).
- 18 January
  - Giovanni Giudici, 83, Roman Catholic prelate, auxiliary bishop of Milan (1990–2003) and bishop of Pavia (2003–2015).
  - Orietta Grossi, 64, Olympic basketball player (1980).
  - Giuseppe Ticli, 44, footballer (Monza, Padova, Pro Patria).
- 19 January – Attilio Busseti, 90, lawyer and politician, senator (1976–1983, 1987–1992).
- 20 January – Pietro Omodeo, 104, biologist.
- 22 January – Gigi Riva, 79, footballer (Cagliari, Legnano, national team).
- 23 January – Giuliano Musiello, 70, footballer (Atalanta, Roma, Verona).
- 24 January – Alberto Tanasini, 78, Roman Catholic prelate, auxiliary bishop of Genoa (1996–2004) and bishop of Chiavari (2004–2021).
- 26 January – Emanuele Catarinicchia, 97, Roman Catholic prelate, bishop of Cefalù (1978–1987) and Mazara del Vallo (1987–2002).
- 27 January
  - Bruno Segre, 105, lawyer, advocate, partisan and politician.
  - Maria Giacobbe, 95, Italian-Danish writer.
- 28 January – Albert Mayr, 80, composer.
- 29 January
  - Sandra Milo, 90, actress (8½, Juliet of the Spirits, Vanina Vanini).
  - Delio Lucarelli, 84, Roman Catholic prelate, bishop of Rieti (1997–2015).
  - Franco Tozzi (it), 79, singer.
- 30 January
  - Roberto Melgrati, 76, football player (Legnano, Como) and coach (Pro Patria).
  - Orazio Schena, 82, Italian-Belgian footballer (Anderlecht, Liège, Tilleur-Saint-Nicolas).

=== February ===
- 3 February – Vittorio Emanuele, Prince of Naples, 86, royal, disputed head of the House of Savoy, and the last crown prince of Italy (since 1983).

=== March ===
- 23 March – Maurizio Pollini, 82, pianist and conductor.
- 26 March
  - Enrico Giusti, 83, mathematician.
  - Giuliano Vangi, 93, sculptor, leukemia.

=== April ===
- 3 April – Stefano Cherchi, 23, jockey, horse riding accident.
- 9 April – Paolo Pininfarina, 65, engineer, designer and businessman.
- 12 April – Roberto Cavalli, 83, fashion designer.

=== May ===
- 4 May – David Messina, 92, sports journalist and television presenter.
- 23 May – Franco Anelli, 60, academic and rector of the Università Cattolica del Sacro Cuore.

=== June ===
- 15 June – Vincent Mauro, 80, Italian-American FIFA football referee
- 17 June – Claudio Graziano, 70, general and chair of Fincantieri.

=== July ===
- 21 July – Gemma Sena Chiesa, 95, archaeologist.

=== August ===
- 22 August – Ottaviano Del Turco, 79, politician and former president of Abruzzo.

=== September ===
- 10 September – Clio Maria Bittoni, 89, former President of Italy Giorgio Napolitano's wife.
- 18 September – Salvatore Schillaci, 59, footballer (Juventus, Inter Milan, national team).
- 21 September – Paola Marella, 61, architect and television presenter, cancer.

=== October ===
- 1 October – Francesco Merloni, 99, industrialist, engineer and politician.
- 18 October – Giulia Manfrini, 36, surfer and snowboarder, impaled by a swordfish.
- 28 October – Marisa Bartoli, 81, actress (La bambolona, The Designated Victim).

=== November ===
- 19 November – Cesare Bonizzi, 78, capuchin friar.

=== December ===
- 26 December – Gianpaolo Ormezzano, 89, sports journalist (La Stampa, Guerin Sportivo, Tuttosport).
