= 2021 in Italy =

- Decades: 2000s; 2010s; 2020s; 2030s
- See also: History of Italy; Timeline of Italian history; List of years in Italy

The following is a list of events of the year 2021 in Italy.

The year is marked by the COVID-19 pandemic as well as the achievements of Italian representatives in many fields, including the Eurovision Song Contest, Paganini Competition, the Olympic and Paralympic games, UEFA Euro 2020, Sofia Open, European Open, World Pastry Cup and much more.

== Incumbents ==
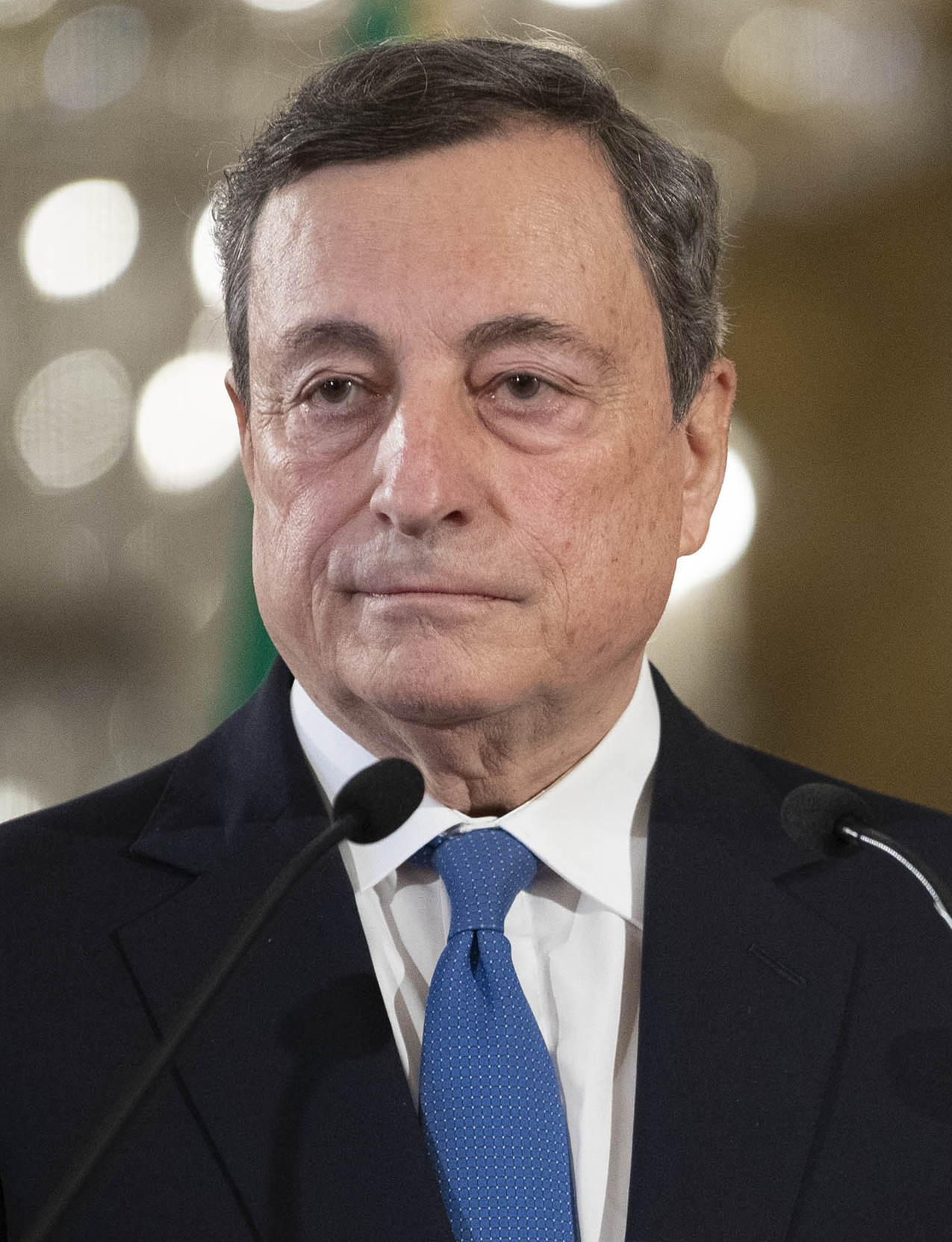
Mario Draghi, former President of the European Central Bank and Italian Prime Minister

- President: Sergio Mattarella
- Prime Minister: Giuseppe Conte (until 13 February), Mario Draghi (starting 13 February)

== Events ==
=== Central themes of the year ===
COVID-19 pandemic in Italy

Protests over COVID-19 policies in Italy

2021 Italian government crisis

=== January ===
- 1 January – New Year
- 4 January – Murders of Peter Neumair and Laura Perselli.
- 13 January – 2021 Italian government crisis: Former Prime Minister Matteo Renzi withdraws the Italia Viva party from the governing coalition.
- 17 January – The first episode of the TV series Mina Settembre premiers on Rai 1, an Italian television network.
- 21 January – The centennial anniversary of the Communist Party of Italy.
- 27 January – As a result of the government crisis, the Conte Cabinet falls, and the Draghi Cabinet gets formed on 13 February.
- 30 January – The Nintendo Switch totals 15 million sales on the Italian territory, surpassing the sales of the Wii U.

=== February ===
- 5 February – According to a survey, Italy is one of the safest nations based on number of homicides, however femicides are increasing, 50% of which are Italian homicides.
- 7 February – A transgender girl is attacked by a squadron in Torre del Greco (Naples). A member of Green Europe condemned the act, declared the event intolerable, and the need for a law to protect LGBT people.
- 13 February – Mario Draghi is appointed Prime Minister, and the Draghi Cabinet is established. All parties except the right-wing Brothers of Italy party take part in the Draghi government.
- 22 February – Italian Ambassador to the Democratic Republic of the Congo, Luca Attanasio, was fatally wounded and died in a hospital in Goma, while his Italian bodyguard and his Congolese driver were directly killed, in an exchange of fire between the rangers of the Virunga National Park and the assumed Rwandan assailants, who attacked the convoy of the United Nations Mission in the Democratic Republic of the Congo of which Attanasio and the rest of the personnel were part of.
- 23 February – The president of the Democratic Republic of the Congo, Felix Tshisekedi, meets the family of the Italian ambassador of the Congo, Luca Attanasio, who was killed in the city of Goma.
- 27 February – The first decree signed by the new prime minister Mario Draghi enters into force. The decree was a ban on travel to areas subject to lockdown.

=== March ===
- 1 March – Marked 160 years of relations and friendship between Iran and Italy.
- 7 March – Måneskin gets a triumph in Sanremo with the song Zitti e buoni, which gets 49% votes and 13 million plays.
- 8 March – A feminist strike takes place in Rome.
- 14 March – Nicola Zingaretti resigns as secretary of the Italian Democratic Party. Zingaretti was replaced by Enrico Letta.
- 17 March – Marks 160 years from the Italian Unification.
- 18 March
  - For the first time in Italian football, an LGBT couple will have a baby. The parents of the baby are female Juventus player Lina Hurtig and her partner Lisa Lantz.
  - This day marks 79 years from the last eruption of Vesuvius in 1944.
- 20 March – In Bolzano, a man kills his parents, the bodies were found at the bottom of the river and the man was subsequently arrested.
- 26 March – Twitter bans profiles of the far-right Forza Nuova movement for inciting hatred and disinformation on COVID-19.
- 30 March – Protests in Verona by artisans, restaurateurs, and farmers.
- 31 March – A nurse who collaborated in the Denise Pipitone case in 2004 discovers a similarity between Denise Pipitone and Olesya Rostov, a Russian girl. The similarity case turns out to be decisive for reopening the investigation.

=== April ===
- 3 April – Ternana Calcio returns to Serie B after 7 years.
- 4 April – Easter Day
- 6 April – Workers protest at Montecitorio and demand for the immediate opening of activities blocked due to COVID-19, clashes with the police are recorded. An Italian man who was dressed similar to the American man who became a symbol of the attack of Donald Trump's supporters on the Capitol was also recorded. CasaPound also participates in the demonstration which is rejected by the police and by the demonstrators. Street vendors also demonstrated and blocked of the streets of Milan with vans and buses.
- 8 April – The Denise Pipitone case reopens after noting a similarity with a Russian girl.
- 19 April – The Italian teams inter, Milan and Juventus are involved in the controversial issue of the super league. Protests by restaurateurs against the government to ask for the immediate blocking of the A1 motorway in Florence.
- 25 April – Italian Liberation Day, 76 years after the liberation from fascism and the end of the Second World War in Italy. Como Football returns to Serie B after 6 years of Serie C.

=== May ===
- 1 May – Italian Workers' Day
- 3 May – The Marsala prosecutor's office returns to investigate the Denise Pipitone case, and investigations at Anna Corona's home after 17 years from the disappearance of the 3-year-old girl resume.
- 4 May – Marks 72 years after the Superga Tragedy, which killed the entire Torino team. The Empoli football team returns to Serie A after 2 years of absence.
- 9 May – A Chinese satellite in free fall risks hitting southern Italy. However, it falls far into the Indian Ocean.
- 10 May – After 23 years, the Salernitana football team returns to Serie A.
- 20 May – Juventus wins the 2020–21 Coppa Italia by beating Atalanta 1–2.
- 22 May – Måneskin wins Eurovision Song Contest 2021 for Italy, giving Italy its first Eurovision win since 1990.
- 23 May
  - A cable car in Mottarone, Piedmont falls near the summit, killing at least 12 people. Two children, aged 5 and 9, are taken to a hospital in Turin.
  - Milanese team Inter, wins the 2020-21 Serie A after 10 years of domination by the Turin team Juventus.
  - Roma become the first Italian team ever to qualify for the new uefa conference league.
  - Juventus women achieve a historical record as the first official team in women's Serie A to have won 22 matches out of 22.
- 27 May – The government intervenes in the case of Denise Pipitone, a parliamentary commission of inquiry is requested on the initiative of the deputies Alessia Morani and Carmelo Miceli of the Democratic Party, to analyze any misdirections, conflicts of interest and anomalies of the previous 17 years of investigation work.
- 28 May – Venezia Calcio returns to Serie A after 19 years.
- 31 May – The powerful mob boss Giovanni Brusca is released from prison after 25 years.

=== June ===
- 2 June – Republic Day
- 11 June – UEFA Euro 2020 opens in Rome with Italy-Turkey (won 3–0 by Italy), the opening concert is done by Andrea Bocelli, the tournament ends on 11 July with Italy Winning the Tournament Defeating England in the final at Wembley.
- 13 June – Ardea shooting.
- 18 June
  - Novara ramming.
  - The Alessandra football team returns to Serie B after 60 years.
- 21 June – Italservice wins the Italian 5-a-side football championship.
- 23 June – A child who went missing in Italy is found by a reporter sent to cover his disappearance. The child is found several kilometers from his home.

=== July ===
- 6 July – The filming of the TV series "La Sposa" with Serena Rossi begins. The series will be broadcast on Rai channels starting from 2022
- 10 July – Islamic terrorism threatens Italy and foreign minister Luigi di Maio, the terrorists said "we are waiting for the promise of our almighty god, that is Rome the city of the crusades and we will enter it epic battles are coming"
- 11 July – The Italian football team wins the Euro 2020 football final at Wembley Stadium against the England team.
- 19 July – A homophobic assault occurs on Bacoli beach, where people exclaimed to 2 lesbian women to leave because they disturb the children. Immediate condemnation of the mayor of Bacoli and the citizens occurred subsequently.
- 22 July – Whirlpool workers in Naples protest in Rome after the company confirmed its intention to close the plant and lay off employees.
- 23 July
  - In Sardinia, fires break out; other regions are affected later.
  - A bus on the island of Capri crashes, causing 28 injuries and the death of the driver.

=== August ===
- 1 August – Marcell Jacobs wins the 100 meters at the 2020 Summer Olympics, becoming the fastest man in the world.
- 4 August – A report shows the data of complaints by LGBT assaulted, confirming the need for a law to protect LGBT people according to the report in Italy that states homophobic attacks occur every 3 days.
- 6 August – The Chievo football team is known for 10 years in Serie A and for the climb from amateurs to professions is excluded from the Serie B championship.
- 7 August – The Milan football team, Inter, sells striker Romelu Lukaku to Chelsea for the sum of 115 million euros. This was recorded as the most expensive deal in the entire series in recent years.
- 8 August – At the end of Tokyo 2020, Olympic Italy concludes the edition with 40 medals.
- 9 August
  - Italy becomes the first European nation for the number of fires.
  - Mount Etna erupts.
- 14 August – A child belonging to German tourists is lost in Ancient Pompeii, the child was found later in the Temple of Apollo.
- 21 August – Serie A, the Italian football championship, will begin on 21 August 2021 and will end on 22 May 2022.
- 22 August – In Pompeii, a body dating back to 2000 years ago is found. It was identified as the body of the freedman Marco Venerio.
- 23 August – Solidarity and support for the Afghan population is expressed in the city of Naples when they flee from the Taliban regime, the demonstrations take place in a peaceful way and are attended by Afghan refugees and many Neapolitans.
- 25 August – For the first time in 30 years, the leader of the Lega, Matteo Salvini is not a candidate for the municipality of Milan.
  - Marks 155 years of relations and friendships between Italy and Japan.
- 27 August – After 3 years in Italy, the Portuguese forward Cristiano Ronaldo leaves Juventus to return to Manchester United.
- 28 August – Near Monte Fiorino, a girl is attacked in the woods by a pack of dogs, the girl was torn apart and killed by the dogs.
  - No green pass demonstrations, tensions between the police and Forza Nuova occur. The movement tries to reach Palazzo Chigi, however the police manage to divert their path towards the rai area, the tensions will not be tackled before evening.
- 29 August – Torre dei Moro fire
- 31 August – The director of the Sportitalia sports channel, Michele Criscitiello, has announced for this date the opening of a second sports channel dedicated to football called "Sportitalia SI Solo"

=== September ===
- 1 September – The railway blockade announced by the no vax was to take place on this day in 54 Italian cities, but the demonstration turns out to be a flop.
- 2 September – President of Italian Republic Sergio Mattarella met Congo president Félix-Antoine Tshisekedi Tshilombo.
- 1–11 September – The 78th Venice International Film Festival is held at Venice Lido.
- 4 September – The Italian women's volleyball team wins the Euro volley against the Serbian national team.
- 6 September – A Telegram group called "stop dictatorship" belonging to the no vax is seized by the Turin prosecutor, on the chat there are telephone numbers of the parliamentarians of Palazzo Chigi, well-known politicians, virologists and government programs.
- 10 September
  - Hornets recurring to the Asian race are sighted in the city of Naples. This is the first time that the insect has been sighted in Italy, after the cases in the United States and Canada.
  - A whirlwind wind hits the island of Pantelleria, killing 2 people and injuring 9.
- 11 September – The Napoli-Juventus match becomes the most watched Italian match in the world, with coverage in Africa, Europe, Canada, the United States, China, Japan, Australia and India.
- 19 September – The Italian men's volleyball team wins the men's euro volleyball against Slovenia 3–2.
- 20 September – The right-wing Brothers of Italy party and the movement in favor of the protection of The People of the Family children ask for the censorship of advertising for sex education in Milan, and also ask for the targ +18 on the Netflix series.
- 24 September
  - To date, about 67% of Italians (40 million inhabitants) are vaccinated against COVID-19.
  - Fridays for Future takes place in Milan.
- 26 September
  - The Italian basketball championship begins.
  - The Pastry World Cup is won by Italy for the third time.
- 28 September – Italy wins the largest pumpkin in the world with a weight of 1226 kilograms.

=== October ===
- 1 October – new demonstrations in Milan for Friday for future, school strikes and demonstrations throughout the city.
- 3 October
  - A private plane crashes into a building in San Donato Milanese near Milan, killing all 8 people on board.
  - During the Serie A Fiorentina-Napoli match won 1–2 by the Neapolitan team, racist insults against the players Kalidou Koulibaly, Victor Osimhen and André-Frank Zambo Anguissa manifest themselves among the fans. the culprits will be identified and banished from the Artemio Franchi stadium.
- 3–4 October – 2021 Italian local elections
- 5 October – The physicist Giorgio Parisi wins the Nobel Prize in Physics.
- 6 October – A referendum is requested to legalize same-sex marriage through a petition, the current Italian system does not allow referendums for approval but only abrogations but with 50,000 signatures the government will be obliged to discuss it to date Italy is the only nation in Europe not having same-sex marriage.
- 6–9 October – The 2021 UEFA Nations League Finals take place in Italy, and are won by France.
- 8 October – Eurovision Song Contest 2022 will be hosted in Turin.
- 9 October
  - Violence in Rome, 12 arrests including the leaders of neo-fascist organization Forza Nuova Fiore and Castellino are also in handcuffs, In the clashes 38 officers were injured, 600 protesters identified.
  - The men's volleyball championship starts.
- 10 October – Following the events that took place the day before, the Democratic Party presents a motion to dissolve the fascist organizations including CasaPound and Forza Nuova, while many will hold an anti-fascist demonstration on October 16.
- 11 October –
  - FIFA 22 dominates the Italian video game market, becoming the first game by number of purchases by Italian gamers.
  - Manuel Winston Reyes, who was convicted of the 1991 murder of Alberica Filo della Torre, is released from prison.
- 12 October – The postal police decided to block the official website of the far-right Forza Nuova movement after the attacks in Rome. The movement allegedly incited hatred, inequality, racism including the attacks of Rome through their portals.
- 14 October – For the first time, 2 transgender girls underwent sex change in the same hospital, operating room and schedule in Florence hospital.
- 15 October
  - No vax and no green pass demonstrations take place in various Italian cities, there are few demonstrators in Naples (300 people), while in Rome Milan and Genoa count a few thousand people, the peak is in Trieste with 5 miles of people on the street where try to infiltrate the crowd the far-right groups Forza Nuova and CasaPound and some far-left groups both rejected by the demonstrators and the police to maintain order after the events in Rome.
  - The historic airline Alitalia changes its name to ITA Airways.
  - 18 Italian films are nominated for the Oscars as best foreign film.
  - To date, Netflix has 4 million subscribers compared to 2020 (2 million subscribers), subscriptions have increased thanks to the Korean series Squid Game.
  - Giorgia Meloni, leader of Brothers of Italy, is rejected by a visit to the Jewish community, after the words of the candidate for mayor in Rome Enrico Michetti.
- 16 October – The demonstration against fascism is held in Rome, 60,000 people participate in defense of italian democracy, in support of the institutions affected last Saturday the demonstration presented a slogan "no more fascisms", while the government evaluates the dissolution of New Force.
- 16–17 October – 2021 Turin municipal election and 2021 Rome municipal election final ballot
- 18 October
  - 26 people investigated in Napoli, Caserta, Avellino, Siena, Roma, Torino, Ragusa, Lecce e Ferrara, are investigated for instigation to neo-nazism and supremacism.
  - Violence of no vax and no green pass in Trieste, demonstrators attack the police by overturning a police van, more than 2000 people participate, four people are reported.
  - Alessandra Amoroso releases her album Tutto accade on the same day she starts her tour in Milan.
- 19 October
  - the former senator of Brothers of Italy, Giancarlo Pittelli, is arrested in an anti-mafia bliz.
  - 2021 Rome Film Festival, Quentin Tarantino is awarded as best director.
- 20 October
  - Starting from this day the digital terrestrial channels will broadcast only in HD, in view of the television revolution that will take place in 2023.
  - Hacker attack on the SIAE
  - In the town of Ercolano an employee is fired after she has performed live hot in her office.
- 21 October – the Korean mosquito spreads to northern Italy.
- 23 October
  - 10 years after the death of the pilot Marco Simoncelli
  - At Expo Dubai, the cuisine of Lazio wins the gratitude of the sheikhs.
- 24 October
  - The MotoGP rider Valentino Rossi runs his last race in Italy in his career.
  - 1942 years from the first largest eruption of Vesuvius which destroyed ancient Pompeii.
- 21–24 October – The Europa Cup of Sails will be held in Naples on the isla of Nisida.
- 25 October
  - COVID infections in Italy return to rise, Trieste becomes the city with more 139 positive infections out of 100 thousand inhabitants following the no vax and no green protests.
  - An Afghan soldier threatened by the Taliban because she is a woman, is welcomed in Italy and is granted residence in Verona.
- 26 October – The Medicane hurricane formed in the Mediterranean strikes Sicily and Calabria, causing 2 victims, The mayors close the schools and ask the population to stay at home to avoid damage.
- 27 October
  - The secret vote wanted by the right-wing parties (league for salvini premier and Forza Italia) block the zan bill the anti-discrimination law, the greatest shame is recorded in the senate where right-wing exponents rejoiced over the pain of LGBT.
  - In Italy the entertainment platform Pluto TV lands, the Italian country becomes the 26th country of the platform.
- 28 October – In Ercolano (province of Naples) 2 boys are killed after a man has mistaken them for thieves.
- 30–31 October
  - Italy adopts solar time from this day until March 2022.
  - The G20 is held in Rome and is in the red zone for reasons of public order.
- 30 October
  - Marco Rizzo's Communist Party organizes a demonstration against Draghi outside the G20 headquarters, playing the anthem of the Soviet Union. 300 protesters are registered.
  - Violence of no green passes in Milan kicked by police, insults to the mayor Giuseppe Sala and attack on a television troupe the people involved are 4000.
  - The city of Naples from Posillipo and the Spanish quarters pays homage to Diego Armando Maradona on the day of his 61st birthday, the football legend played for Naples between 1985 and 1991, many emotions after the death on November 25, 2020, of the former football player.
  - Måneskin are nominated for the American Music Awards.
- 31 October: Italy wins gold and silver at the 2021 butterfly-style rhythmic gymnastics world championships.
  - In Serie A S.C.C Napoli and Salernitana face each other after 73 years the derby is won by the Neapolitan team for 0–1, the last official match in Serie A between the 2 teams dates back to the 1947-1948 Serie A.
  - Italy becomes European champion in American football, beating Sweden 41 to 14.

=== November ===
- 1 November
  - All Saints' Day.
  - Brazilian president Jair Bolsonaro receives honorary citizenship of Anguillara will be greeted by a crowd of applause and protests from the Brazilian community in Italy.
  - The Italian-Jewish community protests in Novara against the no green pass and no vax since the latter compare vaccines and green passes to the Jewish tragedy during the Nazi and Fascist regimes.
  - The first Lady Jill Biden visits the city of Naples.
  - The mayor of Terni approves an ordinance against prostitution by violating miniskirts and necklines in some areas, many are the criticisms that according to many undermine the freedom of women.
- 2 November
  - Commemoration of the dead.
  - Venice is flooded. 140 cm of water cover the city.
  - Igor, a man who killed a bartender in the province of Bologna and a man in Ferrara, is arrested and sentenced to life imprisonment.
  - In Ferrara, a homophobic attack occurs against a group of gay boys. It receives nationwide condemnation.
- 3 November
  - The last film featuring Gigi Proietti, Io sono Babbo Natale, is released one year after the actor's death.
  - The cyclone Poppea affects a large part of Italy especially in Naples and Venice.
  - The discontent of LGBT people continues after the non-approval of the zan bill by the center right, the demonstrations in 44 Italian cities in Pescara banners mention "it's shameful to grab it" .
- 4 November
  - National Unity and Armed Forces Day.
  - Italy signs COP26 interrupting all financing to countries that invest in fossil fuels, therefore Italy is the 21st country to sign.
  - The government officially bans homophobic and transphobic advertisements used by many marches of groups such as pro vita, the movement for families and sometimes by the far-right movement Forza Nuova, so many criticisms have come from groups for families.
  - The tar rejects the appeal of the unions and Whirlpool of Naples workers confirming the layoffs.
  - Robbers kidnap a goldsmith in Milan holding employees hostage for 2 hours, steal watches and jewels worth 1 million euros.
- 5 November
  - The carabinieri arrest 3 people including 2 drug dealers in the city of Naples. The police also confiscated 320 euros for a tour that would have amounted to 1 million euros.
  - The governor of the Campania region Vincenzo De Luca is under investigation for corruption.
- 6 November
  - the demonstration in favor of research into the treatment against breast cancer is held in Naples, the new mayor of Naples Gaetano Manfredi and the president of the Napoli soccer team Aurelio De Laurentiis and player Kalidou Koulibaly also participate.
  - new important discovery in Pompeii the entire slave room re-emerges.
  - 4000 people show up at the no green pass demonstration in Milan journalists are still attacked and clashes with the police are recorded, the situation worsens even in Trieste where 8000 people clash with the police, all demonstrators will be reported.
  - Italy of the six nations gets a historic result 20 minutes 0–0 against All blacks, however there is a resounding defeat for 49-9
- 7 November
  - 800 illegal immigrants from Africa land in Sicily, harsh criticism from center-right leader Matteo Salvini.
  - Italy returns to the podium of the New York marathon, the 28-year-old faniel of Eritrean origin is ranked third.
  - The ski season opens with regard to the Italian winter tourist season.
  - The former Minister of Sports Vincenzo Spadafora comes out live on TV as gay.
  - The United States reopens the borders to Italy after 20 months of COVID-19 restrictions.
- 8 November
  - Bad weather in Italy; 7 regions (Puglia, Lazio, Campania, Molise, Abruzzo, Sicily, Basilicata,) are on yellow alert.
  - Trento is confirmed as the greenest city in Italy with the highest respect for the environment in the nation.
- 9 November
  - The viminale block no green pass group from tomorrow yes to demonstrations but no to demonstrations in historic centers, no to parades and demonstrations with masks.
  - For green pass demonstration Trieste become first city in Europe for infections COVID-19.
- 10 November
  - In padua there is a no vax demonstration where 340 people participate, on the same day the workers of the square of Padua organize a counter demonstration because they are unable to work due to the no vax demonstrations.
  - Avian flu returns to Italy, there are 20 cases in the north-east of the country while there is a case in Rome.
- 11 November – the sports streaming platform DAZN blocks dual subscribers in an attempt to stop piracy.
- 12 November
  - Vasco Rossi's new album "siamo qui" is released.
  - Arrests and investigations into money laundering allegations from Italy to Albania, 2 arrests.
- 13 November
  - Demonstrations of the no green pass flop all over Italy, in Milan an attempt is made to create a forbidden procession but this is immediate by the police, 2 arrest and 30 identified.
  - The premiere of the house of gucci film is held in Milan, with the participation of the world-famous actress and singer lady Gaga and the transgender italian actress Vittoria Schisano.
  - In Naples the 145CM Christmas lights are turned on cover the city that already breathes the air of Christmas.
- 14 November
  - Valentino Rossi Italian legend of motogp, disputes his last race in his career.
  - At MTV ema 2021,Måneskin become the best rock band, the first for Italy.
- 15 November
  - sensationally, Italy football lacks direct access to the 2022 World Cup in Qatar and will therefore have to go through the playoffs.
  - searches of 17 activists present in the telegram group enough dictatorship, users allegedly threatened imprisonment against those who got vaccinated, death of some state officials including prime minister Mario Draghi, references to fascism and possession of weapons.
- 16 November
  - A maxi police operation arrests 12 men in Catania for importing drugs from Holland and Albania.
  - A man kills his son and seriously injures his wife in Viterbo, the case becomes national.
- 17 November
  - In the city of Sassuolo a man exterminates his family, especially his wife, 2 children and mother-in-law while he commits suicide.
  - In Naples 14 arrests are made for corruption, those involved had tried to enter the armed forces by paying.
  - 2 tornadoes hit the Sicilian city of Ragusa causing one death.
- 18 November – Alessandra Amoroso's Italian tour ends to Bergamo.
- 19 November
  - As in all of Europe, the remakes of the games Pokémon diamond and Pokémon Pearl arrive in Italy.
  - In the province of Caserta a building collapses following a gas leak, a woman will be extracted alive from the rubble.
  - Grandmother Peppina, symbol of the earthquake victims in central Italy, dies.
- 20 November
  - A no green pass restaurant is closed by the police for violations of the anti-COVID rules near Rome.
  - in Rome there is a demonstration of the no green passes, among the shame stands out the references to conspiracy theory on COVID-19 and vaccines and the comparison between the state of emergency and the Shoah, while in Milan the police identify 257 people and 2 are put under investigation after trying to reach piazza del duomo using violence.
  - At about 10:30, the only surviving person of the collapse of the Caserta building which occurred due to a gas leak the previous day dies, the woman died as a result of burns on the body.
- 21 November
  - World day of italian sandwich.
  - A baby gang carries out acts of violence in the city of Turin, 20 boys between 16 and 18 insult, kidnap, and beat their peers including 2 girls.
- 23 November
  - 41 years after the irpinia earthquake in Avellino.
  - Throughout Italy there are demonstrations against violence against women, in the city of Bari red ceramic shoes are put on the square.
- 25 November
  - The photo of the green-eyed Afghan girl is rescued in Italy.
  - A year after the death of Maradona a statue is inaugurated in the city of Naples, the former captain of Naples Giordano puts the captain's armband on the statue.
- 26 November
  - Italy and France sign a treaty of friendship and cooperation, strengthening cultural, economic and political ties.
  - Due to the new variant of the COVID-19 virus, Italy blocks travel from African countries South Africa, Lesotho, Botswana, Zimbabwe, Mozambique, Namibia and eSwatini.
- 27 November – Juventus is being investigated for capital gains and false financial statements in the operation that brought Cristiano Ronaldo to Juventus in 2018.
- 28 November
  - First Italian case of the new Omicron variant of COVID-19 identified in South Africa, it is a citizen residing in Caserta who had been in Mozambique.
  - Aurelio De Laurentiis, the former president of the company Corrado fellaini, and the new mayor of Naples Gaetano Manfredi inaugurate a statue in honor of Diego Armando Maradona a few hours before Naples-Lazio that will be placed in the stands.
- 29 November – Due to the increase in COVID-19 cases following the no green pass and no vax events, Friuli-Venezia Giulia passes from the white area to the yellow area with consequent return to restrictions.

=== December ===
- 1 December – The third dose of the COVID-19 vaccine is available to over 40s.
- 2 December – Facebook removes a no vax network intending to carry out acts of harassment and vandalism between Italy and France.
- 4 December – A no vax protest in Trieste and Rome where 500 people participate (Trieste) 3000 (Rome) shows a high tension with the police while the demonstrators incite hatred chants against Mario Draghi and the vaccinated Italians.
- 5 December – As per tradition every year, the Trentino Alto Adige region as well as neighboring Austria celebrates krampus.
- 6 December
  - Massimo Ferrero the president of the Genoa football team Sampdoria is arrested for bankruptcy.
  - The super green pass, an enhanced version of the normal green pass, comes into effect.
  - In Rome, a peaceful protest by school principals takes place in front of the ministry of education, following the lack of importance in helping schools in the COVID-19 pandemic.
- 7 December – In Milan, an 82-year-old man is killed with a chainsaw by a man of Romanian origin who broke into the old man's house.
- 8 December
  - Feast of the Immaculate Conception.
  - 1800 users in Varese are sanctioned for having viewed the Sky and Dazn broadcasters for free.
- 9 December – Transphobia in a hairdressing school in Palermo, a transgender girl is forced to go to the boys' bathroom with insults on her personality, an immediate complaint arrives.
- 12 December – In Ravanusa a building collapses following a gas leak killing all residents of the building.
- 13 December – Calabria becomes the yellow zone for COVID-19.
- 14 December
  - Due to COVID-19, the Italian birth rate is decreasing.
  - A sushi place in Naples is closed after having recorded cases of salmonella and the death of a boy who had eaten sushi in this place.
- 15 December – Following the rise in COVID-19 infections, the Italian government extends the state of emergency until March 31, 2022, with lockdown on the unvaccinated and limitations on national and international flights.
- 16 December – AC Milan celebrates 122 years from its foundation.
- 17 December – A state funeral is carried out for the victims of the Ravanusa tragedy.
- 18 December
  - An earthquake is recorded throughout Lombardy with its epicenter in Bergamo, the quake was also felt in other regions including the city of Trento.
  - The president of the Campania region Vincenzo De Luca, prohibits New Year's and Christmas parties and feasts in the square, a measure also taken by the mayor of Rome and the government, the no vax are not there and promise to be in Piazza del Popolo in Rome to celebrate without authorization.
  - In Turin, a crane collapses, killing 3 workers and injuring passers-by.
- 20 December
  - Prime Minister Mario Draghi meets the new German Chancellor Olaf Scholz at Palazzo Chigi.
  - In Naples the police seize a ton of powerful bombs made and sold illegally.
- 21 December
  - For the first time since May, infections in Italy rise to 30,000 while 153 deaths from Covid.
  - The Italian government approves an amendment that makes it illegal to raise animals to produce fur.
  - A fire near Agrigento in Sicily kills a 2-year-old girl.
- 22 December – the project is presented to create the new Milan stadium by 2027, which will host the matches of Inter and A.C milan.
- 23 December
  - Catania Calcio was declared bankrupt after 75 years and the club currently played in Serie C.
  - for the first time since March 2020, the Italian football federation suspends entire days these are the Serie B matches that should have been played on 26 and 29 December the suspension is due to the defense of the Omicron variant of COVID-19.
- 24 December
  - A fishmonger is killed during a robbery in Naples.
  - Former Sampdoria president Massimo Ferrero arrested weeks before is released from prison however he will have to remain under house arrest.
- 25 December – Italian Christmas
- 26 December – Saint Stephen
- 27 December
  - A fire in a factory generates a cloud of smoke near Venice at 11:00 am.
  - Marco Lanna becomes the new president of Sampdoria after the arrest of the former president Ferraro.
- 28 December – Milan bans New Year's barrels for December 31.
- 31 December
  - The message of President Sergio Mattarella's mandate.
  - Despite the ban on not using barrels, barrels are used at midnight, injuring 500 people in different regions.

== Deaths ==
=== January ===
- 1 January – Emanuele Chiapasco, baseball player (b. 1930)
- 1 January – Pierantonio Costa, diplomat, entrepreneur (b. 1939)
- 2 January – Rodolfo Calanca, astronomical (b. 1953)
- 2 January – Marco Formentini, politician, officer (b. 1930)
- 3 January – Rosa Giannetta Alberoni, writer, journalist, lecturer (b. 1945)
- 4 January – Franco Loi, poet (b. 1930)
- 5 January – Emilia De Biasi, politician (b. 1958)
- 9 January – Lara Vinca Masini, art critic (b. 1923)
- 10 January – Antonio Sabàto, actor (b. 1943)
- 11 January – Fabio Enzo, football player (b. 1946)
- 14 January – Romano Misserville, politician (b. 1934)
- 15 January – Paola Veneroni, actress (b. 1922)
- 15 January – Alberto Malavasi, football player (b. 1936)
- 19 January – Emanuele Macaluso, politician (b. 1924)
- 21 January – Cecilia Mangini, director, documentary maker, set designer, photographer (b. 1927)
- 21 January – Aldo Vianello, poet (b. 1937)
- 22 January – Rocco Caccavari, politician (b. 1938)

=== February ===
- 12 February – Gianni Beschin, football referee

=== March ===
- 18 March – Elsa Peretti, jewelry designer, philanthropist, and fashion model (b. 1940)
- 28 March – Gianluigi Colalucci, restorer and academic (b. 1929)

=== April ===
- 23 April – Maria Ilva Biolcati, singer and actress

=== June ===
- 22 June – Antonio Salines, actor and director (b. 1936)

=== July ===
- 5 July – Raffaella Carrà, singer and TV host (b. 1943)
- 15 July – Libero De Rienzo, actor, director and set designer (b. 1977)

=== August ===
- 21 August – Nicoletta Orsomando announcer (b. 1929)
- 26 August – Guido Castelnuovo Tedesco, politician (b. 1988)

=== September ===
- 1 September – Anna Cataldi, journalist and writer
- 2 September – Daniele Del Giudice, author and lecturer
- 3 September – Attilio Maseri, cardiologist
- 5 September – Ezio Della Savia, Olympic swimmer
- 6 September – Nino Castelnuovo, actor

=== October ===
- 20 October – Dino Felisetti, politician and lawyer, deputy (1972–1987) (b. 1919)
- 29 October – Rossano Rubicondi, latin lover, actor, television personality and fourth husband of Ivana Trump. (b.1972)

=== November ===
- 5 November – Silvio Laurenzi, actor and costume designer

=== December ===
- 2 December – Giuseppe Chiaretti, archbishop

== See also ==
=== Related timelines for current period ===
- 2021
- 2021 in politics and government
- 2021 in Italian television
- 2020s
