= 2022 in Italy =

- Decades: 2000s; 2010s; 2020s; 2030s
- See also: History of Italy; Timeline of Italian history; List of years in Italy

The following is a list of events from the year 2022 in Italy.

Following the COVID-19 pandemic, Italy's economy was affected by a global inflation surge. In January, President Sergio Mattarella was re-elected for a second term. On February 27, the Italian government responded to the Russian invasion of Ukraine as a partner of the North Atlantic Treaty Organization (NATO), authorizing weapons shipments to Ukraine. Former Italian Prime Minister Mario Draghi stated, "The aggression against Ukraine is barbaric and a threat to the whole of Europe. The European Union must react with utmost determination". Later in the year, a government crisis led to subsequent elections, which brought into office Giorgia Meloni, the first female Prime Minister of Italy.

== Incumbents ==
- President: Sergio Mattarella
- Prime Minister: Mario Draghi (until 22 October), Giorgia Meloni (from 22 October)

== Events ==
=== Ongoing ===
- COVID-19 pandemic in Italy
- Protests over COVID-19 policies in Italy

=== January ===
- 1 January – Despite a public ban on firecrackers, 14 people across Italy were seriously injured due to unauthorized fireworks.
- 3 January – A 40-year-old woman drowned her son in the sea off Torre del Greco.
- 8 January
  - The Scala dei Turchi monument in Agrigento (Realmonte) was vandalized.
  - Serie A announced the closure of football stadiums with a capacity of over 5,000 due to the spread of the Omicron variant.
- 13 January – The tenth anniversary of the sinking of the Costa Concordia, in which 32 people died, was commemorated.
- 15 January – In Turin, a man knocked a child off a balcony while playing a game with her, resulting in her death.
- 16 January – Electric bicycle sales rose significantly in Naples, reportedly reaching 15,000 units in a single day.
- 17 January
  - Following the spread of the Omicron variant, the Aosta Valley was put in the orange zone.
  - A marriage equality committee was established to speed up the legalisation of same-sex marriage in Italy.
- 19 January
  - A man from Viareggio, suffering from psychological disorders, barricaded himself at home with his elderly father and was arrested for attempted murder of a firefighter.
  - Interior Minister Luciana Lamorgese signed a security pact against crime in Naples.
- 20 January
  - A family from Syria with serious physical disabilities was taken to Siena to be cared for by Caritas.
  - The Royal Palace of Caserta celebrated the 270th anniversary of the start of its construction.
- 21 January
  - Construction work began on the new Salerno Airport, which was to be completed by 2024.
  - The 40th anniversary of the Italian debut of the Japanese cartoon Tiger Mask was commemorated.
  - The European Court of Human Rights condemned Italy for having separated a mother from her daughter in the city of Brescia.
- 22 January
  - Silvio Berlusconi withdrew his candidacy a few days before the presidential election.
  - In Taranto, a man injured 2 officers who were chasing his car.
  - An 18-year-old boy died while working as an intern in Udine.
  - Twenty-three people were arrested across Apulia and Calabria for involvement in international drug trafficking from Turkey and the Netherlands.
  - Starbucks closed its stores in Milan.
  - A few dozen people protested in Milan against vaccines and green passes.
- 23 January
  - In Brescia (Rezzato), an accident between a car and a bus killed 5 young people.
  - A survey was released naming Milan the most expensive city in Italy, with the cost of food 47% higher than in Naples. Naples, Palermo, and Pescara were named the cheapest cities.
- 24 January
  - The 2022 Italian presidential election occurred.
  - Following the spread of COVID-19 (Omicron variant), the Health Minister Roberto Speranza signed an ordinance that put Piedmont, Sicily, and Friuli in the orange zone, while Apulia and Sardinia were put in the yellow zone.
- 26 January
  - A 12-year-old Jewish student in Livorno reported being assaulted by a group of peers, an incident condemned by the Minister of Education, Patrizio Bianchi.
  - The houses of illegal IPTV broadcasters, who provided free viewing of Sky channels, DAZN and films, were searched in the regions of Calabria, Campania, Emilia-Romagna and Tuscany.
  - The financial police confiscated 50 smartphones and shut down an illegal service where Sky's paid service was broadcast completely free of charge.
- 28 January – In Ostia, a girl reported her parents to the Carabinieri.
- 29 January – Sergio Mattarella was re-elected as President for a second term.
- 30 January – A fire in an apartment in Reggio Emilia killed two children.

=== February ===
- 1–5 February – The Sanremo Music Festival 2022 took place in Sanremo.
- 1 February
  - Russian president Vladimir Putin spoke by phone with Prime Minister Mario Draghi seeking reassurances on gas supplies for Italy.
  - In the city of Agrigento, a policeman killed his son with a service pistol.
  - In Cagliari, a newborn was hit by a motorcyclist in front of his mother; the man was later sentenced.
- 2 February
  - In Rome, a group of activists vandalized the headquarters of the Ministry of Ecological Transition.
  - In Grumo Nevano, Naples, a man strangled a 23-year-old woman to death; He was arrested afterwards.
- 3 February – Sergio Mattarella was sworn in as President of Italy, starting his second term.
- 5 February
  - Milan was classified as a Major European city, with a total of 20 skyscrapers.
  - CBS broadcast the Derby di Milano to promote football in the United States. The match was broadcast live from San Siro.
- 8 February
  - Carabinieri searched a Roma camp in Giugliano, Naples, finding ultra-light aircraft engines stolen the night before.
  - In Como, an elderly woman who had died two years earlier was found by the police sitting on a chair in a state of complete decomposition.
- 9 February – Following an investigation into corruption in Salerno, five people were arrested, including the deputy prosecutor Roberto Penna.
- 11 February – Mount Etna erupted during the night.
- 15 February – A man from Rome found a note inside a COVID-19 mask, allegedly written by an African slave in China. However, there was no evidence to confirmed its authenticity.
- 18 February
  - In Turin, during a demonstration for the protection of young interns, a group of students attacked the confindustria building and threw eggs at the police; seven injuries were recorded.
  - A ship traveling between Italy and Greece was damaged by a fire.
- 19 February – Protesters consisting mainly of university students and activists protested the Green Pass in Milan.
- 24 February – Prime Minister Mario Draghi and Foreign Minister Luigi Di Maio condemned Russia following its invasion of Ukraine.
- 27 February
  - Following the Russian invasion of Ukraine, Prime Minister Mario Draghi announced that Italy would align itself with the European Union's sanctions against Russia.
  - The Italian government closed its airspace to Russian planes.
- 28 February
  - The first Ukrainian refugees arrived, mostly by bus, at Italian cities such as Trieste, Milan, Rome and Naples.
  - The Italian government sent weapons and equipment to Ukraine, while Italian soldiers were positioned in Romania alongside other NATO forces.

=== March ===
- 1 March
  - Prime Minister Mario Draghi announced the reopening of coal factories due to the ongoing gas crisis.
  - The 40th anniversary of the first broadcast of Lady Oscar was commemorated.
  - The Italian embassy in Ukraine was moved from Kyiv to Lviv for security reasons.
- 5 March – A demonstration against the war in Ukraine was held in Rome with over 50,000 people taking part; some demonstrators protested against NATO.
- 6 March – The police seized villas, yachts and luxury goods from Russian oligarchs present in Italy following the economic sanctions imposed on Russia after the invasion of Ukraine.
- 7 March – Due to the Russian invasion of Ukraine, the prices of wheat and petrol rose throughout Italy and Europe.
- 12 March – Foreign Minister Luigi di Maio visited Angola and the Republic of the Congo to find new agreements on gas supplies to Italy.
- 16 March
  - In Vicenza, a 25-year-old man killed his parents to steal their money and investments.
  - Schools in Somma Vesuviana, Naples, welcomed Ukrainian children who had escaped from the war.
- 17 March – The 161st anniversary of Italian unification was commemorated.
- 24 March – The Italy national football team failed to qualify for the FIFA World Cup for the second consecutive time after Russia 2018, losing 1–0 in the playoff match against North Macedonia in Palermo.
- 29 March – Mario Draghi visited the city of Naples, where protestors demonstrated against unemployment and COVID-19 vaccinations.
- 30 March – Mario Draghi and Russian president Vladimir Putin discussed peace in Ukraine.
- 31 March
  - The state of emergency related to the COVID-19 pandemic officially ended.
  - A storm in Palermo damaged buildings in the city.

=== April ===
- 1 April
  - A bill that would legalize same-sex marriage in Italy was presented for the first time in the Senate.
  - After a year, the parliamentary commission closed its inquiry into the Denise Pipitone case without new findings.
- 3 April – Bari Calcio returned to Serie B after 5 years.
- 5 April – Thirteen earthquakes were recorded in the Phlegraean Fields.
- 11 April – Catania Calcio was expelled from the Serie C championship and declared total bankruptcy.
- 16 April – Mario Draghi and Foreign Minister Luigi Di Maio traveled to Angola for an agreement on the import of gas.
- 17 April
  - An attack in Piazza San Carlo near the Diego Armando Maradona stadium in Naples killed a 25-year-old man.
  - Numerous attacks took place in Trieste and Trento; a 14-year-old boy was seriously injured in a stabbing.
- 18 April – During the Napoli-Roma football match, 91 cars were seized, 135 reports were made, and 27 squatters were apprehended.
- 21 April – Foreign minister Luigi Di Maio signed an agreement for gas supplies to Italy with the Republic of the Congo.
- 24 April
  - For the first time in the history of Italian football, a team from Trentino Alto Adige, was FC Südtirol, landed in Serie B.
  - Modena F.C returned to Serie B.
- 25 April: Liberation Day
  - A brawl occurred between "baby gangs" in Naples, reflecting the growing problem of "baby gangs" in main Italian cities such as Naples and Milan.
  - Crotone Calcio definitively collapsed, ending a cycle of alternating between Serie A and Serie B, and returned to Serie C after 13 years.
  - The secretary of the PD Enrico Letta was harshly contested by a far-left group that called for Italy to leave NATO.
- 27 April
  - In Nola, Caritas welcomed around 120 Ukrainians who fled the war.
- 28 April
  - A 60-year-old bartender from Pesaro was sentenced to three years in prison for pedophilia.
  - Football prosecutor Mino Raiola was hospitalized urgently for lung disease; rumors about his death began to circulate and were immediately denied.
- 30 April
  - The court of cassation canceled the acquittal of Simone Pillon; after 6 years, the Senator of the Lega would return to trial for homophobic discrimination.
  - Reports were made that, according to a former Russian minister, Russia was preparing an attack on the NATO countries and a target to hit would be in Aviano (Pordenone).
  - After two days of speculation, the death of Mino Raiola was announced by his family.

=== May ===
- 1 May
  - The government lifted all major restrictions against COVID-19 except for mask requirements.
  - Some owners of a fishmonger in Naples were attacked while opening the shop.
  - Russian Foreign Minister Lavrov threatened Italy, saying it would be in the front row against Russia.
- 2 May – The Roman rock group Måneskin joined the Spotify Billions club.
- 4 May
  - A woman from Macerata was brutally beaten by her husband after he discovered her divorce intentions.
  - The Samarate massacre occurred.
  - Postal police and Save the Children recommended greater attention to online games, as pedophile victims had risen 47% across Italy.
  - Car thefts occurred in Somma Vesuviana, with the carabinieri arresting two people.
- 5 May
  - In Milan, a 90-year-old woman was robbed by thieves who had offered to help her with an ATM.
  - Roma became the first Italian team to reach the UEFA Conference League final.
- 6 May
  - Cremonese returned to Serie A after 26 years.
  - Lecce returned to Serie A after two years.
- 7 May
  - Dimitri Roveri, a provincial footballer for Mantova 1911, died on the pitch following a cardiac arrest.
  - The dead body of a boy was found in Milan.
  - An illegal Labrador puppy mill in the city of Sessa Aurunca was closed.
- 8 May
  - A man from Somma Vesuviana managed to escape from a robbery attempt while thieves shot at his car.
  - In the city of Alessandria, a lesbian woman was beaten and sent to the emergency room.
  - San Donato Tavarnelle arrived in Serie C for the first time. Its promotion confirmed the best period for the provincial teams since 2010.
- 10–14 May – Eurovision Song Contest 2022 was held in Turin, and won by Ukrainian folk rap group Kalush Orchestra with the song "Stefania".
- 10 May – A drug dealer from Rome escaped on a scooter after being chased by the police, and was subsequently arrested inside a McDonald's.
- 11 May – 2021–22 Coppa Italia final Inter-Juventus. Inter won 2–4.
- 13 May – Milan became the first city in Italy to use QR codes to pay bills in restaurants without waiting.
- 14 May
  - A retirement home in San Vitaliano (Naples) gave expired drugs to the elderly.
  - The Filadelfia Stadium in Turin was reopened.
- 15 May
  - Two boys were stabbed while walking in the maritime area of Naples.
  - After 15 years in Serie A, Genoa were relegated to Serie B.
- 16 May
  - Rome was put on red alert zone for swine fever spread because of boars.
  - In the town of Brusciano (Naples), 17 representatives were arrested from groups linked to Camorra.
- 17 May – Milan was proclaimed an area of freedom for LGBT people, and also recognized the sex change of trans people.
- 20 May – Monkeypox arrived in Italy.
- 22 May
  - Milan won Serie A after 11 years.
  - Salernitana became the first team not to be relegated to Serie B with 31 points.
- 23 May
  - The 30-year anniversary of the Capaci massacre, where the anti-Mafia judge Giovanni Falcone was killed, was commemorated.
  - First hospitalization for monkeypox in Arezzo.
- 24 May
  - In Turin, the police seized an orange truck containing drugs; the two drivers were arrested.
  - The first positive cases of monkeypox in Lombardy.
- 29 May – A shooting took place in the comune of Qualiano (Naples).
- 30 May
  - In a school in Bergamo, a cylinder exploded and 5 children were burned.
  - Two sisters were scarred with acid in Naples.

=== June ===
- 3 June – Milan became the first municipality to approve a gender registry.
- 10 June – The case of Chievo Verona, which could return to Serie B, was reopened.
- 18 June – In Catania, an 11-year-old girl was killed by her mother.
- 21 June – The political party Movimento 5 Stelle split following the departure of Luigi Di Maio, who would form a new party.
- 27 June – After the Caserta pride parade, homophobic graffiti and attacks were recorded.

=== July ===
- 3 July – 2022 Marmolada serac collapse.
- 3–6 July – Olympics of the Real Neapolitan pizza were held.
- 8 July
  - A storm struck Naples, causing major inconvenience and damage.
  - Teramo Calcio and Campobasso Calcio were excluded from the 2022–23 Serie C season.
- 11 July – The first convictions for the attacks on the CGIL headquarters in autumn were issued; all Forza Nuova participants were sentenced to six years in prison, except the two leaders, who were placed under house arrest.
- 13 July
  - In Lecce, the gender registry for trans and non-binary people was approved; it was the second Italian municipality to do so.
  - The Catania football club was re-founded and would restart from Serie D.
- 14 July – The 2022 Italian government crisis of the Draghi government began.
- 16 July – The West Nile virus returned to Italy, with the first cases in Veneto and Emilia-Romagna, and one death registered.
- 20 July – The Senate voted with 95 of the senators in favor of the trust in Mario Draghi, who was rejected.
- 21 July – Prime Minister Mario Draghi announced his resignation while President Sergio Mattarella dissolved the chambers and called for new elections.

=== August ===
- 9 August – Domino's Pizza announced that it would pull out of the Italian market after seven years.

=== September ===
- 6 September – The investigation into the 1996 disappearance of Angela Celentano was reopened.
- 9 September – Brothers of Italy caused controversy after criticizing the cartoon Peppa Pig for including a lesbian couple.
- 15–16 September – The 2022 Marche flood occurred.
- 25 September – The 2022 Italian general election took place.
- 26 September – The students of the Manzoni high school in Milan occupied the building to protest Meloni's victory.

=== October ===
- 13 October – Ignazio La Russa became president of the Senate of the Republic. He was the first politician with a neo-fascist background to hold the position of President of the Senate, the second highest-ranking office of the Italian Republic.
- 14 October – Ultraconservative Lorenzo Fontana became president of the Chamber of Deputies.
- 19 October – Volleyball player Paola Egonu decided to leave the Italian national team after various racist insults.
- 20 October
  - In Naples, the NAS closed the pizzeria that invented the pizza Margherita (in 1889) due to poor cleaning.
  - The Salerno police and the financial police arrested a drug dealer for selling drugs on the seafront.
- 21 October
  - Giorgia Meloni received the task of forming a new government from President Sergio Mattarella; she became the first female prime minister in Italian history.
  - An illegal immigrant from The Gambia who had been selling drugs for six years in Salerno was arrested and repatriated.
  - Six people were put under house arrest after stealing fish from Salerno markets.
- 22 October – The Meloni Cabinet became operational. It was variously described as a shift to the political right, as well as the first far-right-led coalition in Italy since World War II.
- 27 October – A man stabbed five people, including the Monza Calcio player Pablo Marì in the city of Assago (Milan).
- 27–29 October
  - The 100th anniversary of the March on Rome.
  - Thousands of supporters of Benito Mussolini paraded.

=== November ===
- 16 November – Italy was officially a candidate to host Euro 2032.
- 26 November – 2022 Ischia landslide.

=== December ===
- 7 December – In Verona, 13 people from groups linked to the fascist extreme right used sticks and iron chains to attack a group of Moroccan families celebrating Morocco's victory over Spain.
- 22 December – In the Denise Pipitone case, former prosecutor Maria Angioni was arrested for making false claims about the investigation to find the girl who disappeared 18 years earlier.
