= Omodeo =

Omodeo may refer to:

== Place ==
- Lake Omodeo, articial lake in Sardinia, Italy

== Surname ==
- Adolfo Omodeo (1889-1946), Italian historian and politician
- Paula Omodeo (born 1986), Argentine politician
- Pietro Omodeo (1919-2024), Italian biologist

== See also ==
- Omodeo Tasso (XIII Century), Italian patriarch of the Thurn und Taxis
