= Pierantonio Costa =

Italian businessman and diplomat (1939–2021)

- Born: 7 May 1939; Mestre, Venice, Italy
- Died: 1 January 2021 (aged 81); Germany
- Occupations: Businessman and diplomat
- Known for: Saving people's lives during the Rwanda genocide
- Awards: Italian Gold Medal of Civil Valor (1994); Commander of the Order of Merit of the Italian Republic (1994)

Pierantonio Costa (7 May 1939 – 1 January 2021) was an Italian businessman, and diplomat who was the Italian honorary consul in Kigali during the Rwandan genocide in 1994. He was noted for the humanitarian assistance and safe passages that he arranged for over 2,000 people including over 375 children fleeing violence during this time. He was a recipient of the Commander of the Order of Merit of the Italian Republic honor. He was nominated for the 2011 Nobel Peace Prize along with two Rwandan women Zura Karuhimbi and Yolande Mukagasana.

== Early life ==
Costa was born in Mestre, a borough of Venice in Italy, on 7 May 1939, to Mariangela (née Colombo) and Pietro Giuseppe. He was fifth among seven siblings. He completed his studies in Vicenza and Verona before moving to the Belgian Congo where his father had previously emigrated. During this period, his father set up a thriving orange and coffee plantation. During Costa's time in the Congo, he witnessed the 1960 violence in Bukavu where he arranged for transportation of Congolese refugees across Lake Kivu. When the Simba rebellion broke out in the Congo, he moved over to Rwanda in 1965.

== Career ==
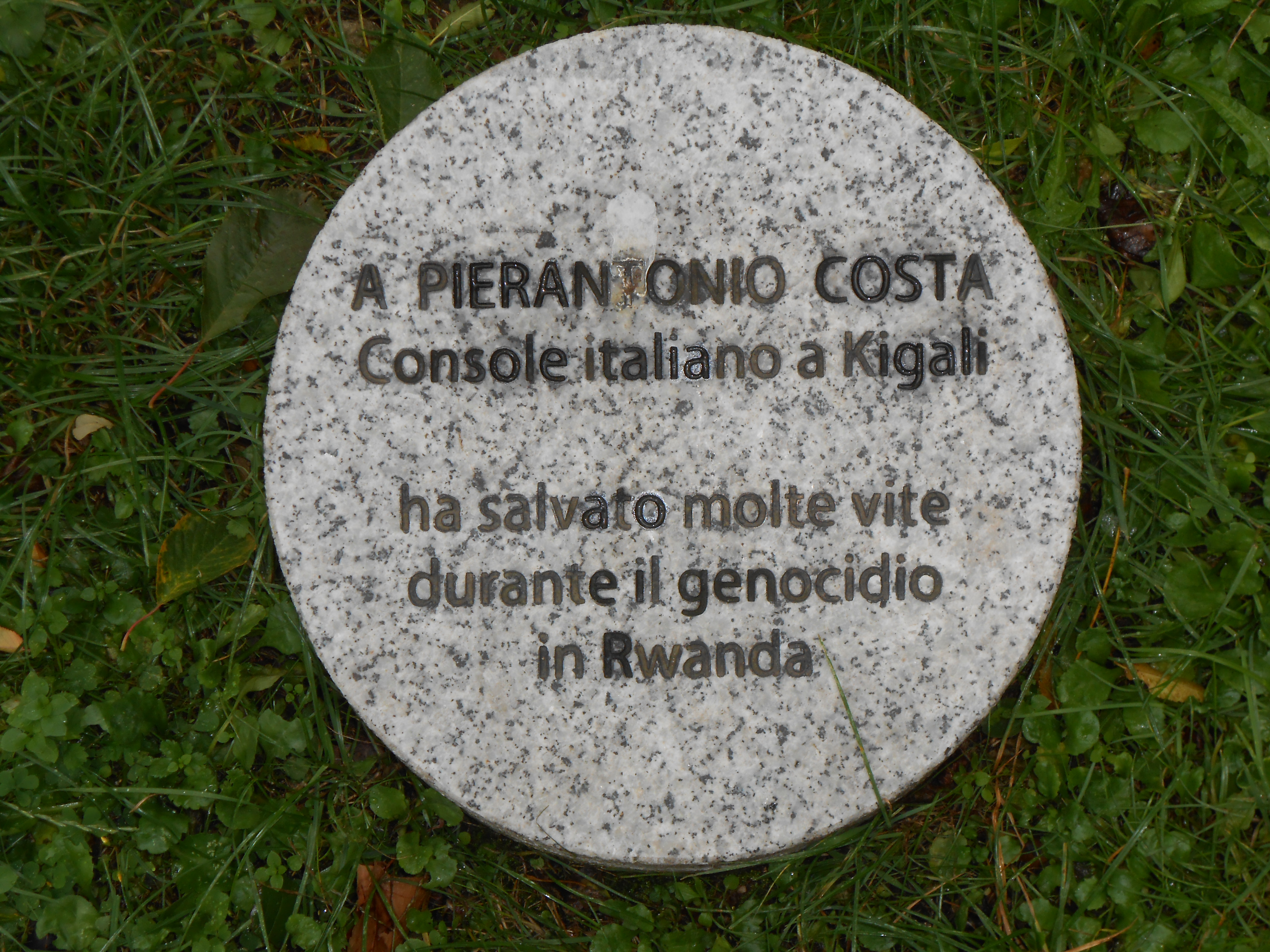
Memorial stone in honor of Costa's services at the Giardino dei Giusti di tutto il mondo in Milan.

When Costa moved to Rwanda, he was a businessman holding four companies. He was also the Italian honorary consul in Kigali, Rwanda, from 1988 to 2003. While he was serving as consul, the Rwandan genocide broke out from 6 April to 21 July 1994. He moved to his brother's house in Burundi during this period; from there, he traveled back and forth from Rwanda to arrange for the rescue and safe passage for those impacted by the violence. He began by helping evacuate Italians and citizens of other western nations, but he soon started arranging passage for persecuted Rwandan Tutsis as well. He used his diplomatic permissions to arrange for exit permits for those fleeing the violence He dealt with local militiamen while crossing the checkpoints between Rwanda and Burundi. He also coordinated with NGOs including the Red Cross to arrange for humanitarian services. He rescued over 2,000 impacted people, including over 375 children from a Red Cross orphanage.

During this period, he lost over $3 million of his assets, and all four of his companies were wiped out. He also used his personal savings and borrowings to arrange the permits, convoys, and for tips and bribes to those manning the checkpoints. In a conversation with Italian journalist Luciano Scalettari, he revealed that he lost $300,000 of personal savings and was left with a little over $1,000.

For his role in providing humanitarian assistance during the conflict, he was nominated - along with two Rwandan women Zura Karuhimbi and Yolande Mukagasana - for the 2011 Nobel Peace Prize. Speaking reluctantly of his work, in Alessandro Rocca's documentary La lista del console (transl. The Consul's List), he said, "Ho solo risposto alla mia coscienza. Quello che va fatto lo si deve fare." (transl. "I just responded to my conscience. What must be done must be done.")

== Honors ==
Costa was awarded the Italian Government's gold medal for displaying civil valor and received a similar award from the Belgian Government. In the citation, the Italian Government noted that his actions to rescue those fleeing violence while putting his own life into danger represented a "Nobile esempio di grande altruismo e altissimo spirito di sacrificio" (transl. Noble example of great altruism and the highest spirit of sacrifice). He was referred to as the "Italian Schindler" by the local media for his actions during this period, and was also given the title of "Righteous" by the Gardens of the Righteous of Milan and Padua. A stone was dedicated in recognition of his services at the Gardens of the Righteous in Milan and a tree at the Gardens of the Righteous in Milan.

- Italian Government's Gold Medal of Civil Valor (1994)
- Commander of the Order of Merit of the Italian Republic (1994)

== Personal life ==
Costa married his wife, Mariann, a Swiss citizen, when he was in Rwanda. The couple had three children: two sons and one daughter. One of his sons continues to manage Costa's business interests in print and advertising in Rwanda.

Costa died on 1 January 2021 in Germany. He was 81.

== Books ==
- Costa, Pierantonio; Scalettari, Luciano (2004). La lista del console. Ruanda: cento giorni un milione di morti (in Italian). Paoline. ISBN 978-88-315-2641-8.
- Costa, Pierantonio (2008). The Consul's List: Rwanda : a Hundred Days a Million Dead. Ave Maria Centre of Peace. ISBN 978-0-9782800-1-7.

== Media ==
- La Lista Del Console (transl. The Consul's List), documentary film by Alessandro Rocca (2010)
- Hotel Rwanda. In the first batch of evacuations, Costa travelled the country collecting people in different towns, while his then twenty-year-old son Olivier helped by gathering Kigali residents in Hôtel des Mille Collines. This was part of the events fictionalised in the movie Hotel Rwanda, where names are exchanged between the different participants.
