= Disappearance of Angela Celentano =

1996 missing child case in Italy

Angela Celentano
- Born: Angela Celentano; 11 June 1993; Italy
- Disappeared: 10 August 1996 (aged 3); Monte Faito, Italy
- Status: Missing for 30 years, 2 months and 25 days
- Parents: Catello Celentano; Maria Staiano

Locations
1 Location last seen.

Angela Celentano (born 11 June 1993) is an Italian missing person. Her disappearance occurred on 10 August 1996 on Monte Faito in the municipality of Castellammare di Stabia, in the province of Naples. Celentano, who was three years old at the time, disappeared during the annual trip organised by the Evangelical Community of Vico Equense.

== Disappearance ==
Parents Maria Staiano and Catello Celentano had decided to take their daughters Rossana, Angela and Naomi on a trip. Shortly after 1pm, Angela Celentano's father noticed that his daughter was not nearby playing.

Renato, an 11-year-old boy, said that shortly before he and Angela had gone down the path that led to the parking lot to put his ball in the car. He had asked Angela not to follow him, but she had not wanted to listen to him. Halfway down, the path crossed another path: there Renato had insisted that Angela return to her mother; then he had continued on alone. After leaving the ball in the car, he had returned to the community without meeting anyone. All those present, relatives, friends and volunteers, began to look for Angela in all directions. The area was very busy, with many hikers, but no one seemed to have seen her. In the following days, while the parents never left the place of the disappearance, the Carabinieri, the Guardia di Finanza, the Police, the Italian Army, dog units and helicopters also intervened, under the direction of the Prefecture of Naples. In the end, the investigators came to the conclusion that Angela was no longer in that area.

In those days Luca and Renato, two children present at the trip, were also questioned. It has never been clear which of them saw Angela last. Their versions of the facts have always been discordant. Nine days after Angela's disappearance, Catello received an unexpected phone call. On the other end, all he could hear was a little girl crying and a voice that said "Your dad." Then it ended. No questions, no requests. The voice of that little girl has never been recognized with certainty.

== Developments ==
- November 4, 2001: A Roma girl who looked like her was stopped while begging in a nomad camp in the province of Salerno . Her parents immediately showed her identity documents. However, the little girl was taken to an institution, where they did a DNA test on her, which was incompatible with Angela's.
- February 23, 2009: A girl begging near a traffic light in the center of Taranto prompted a Taranto motorist to call 113. However, medical checks and facial comparisons gave negative results: it was only a resemblance.
- The case was reopened in 2022.
- The case was covered by the television programmes Chi l'ha visto?.

== Investigations ==
=== The kidnapping trail by the uncle ===
In the summer of 1999, her uncle Gennaro Celentano was investigated by the Torre Annunziata prosecutor's office on charges of kidnapping, then in December of the same year he was cleared.

=== The Celeste Ruiz Case: The Mexican Trail ===
A Mexican girl claimed in some emails to her parents that she recognized herself in the photos of the missing child. Maria Staiano, Angela's mother, said that the first email dated back to 25 May 2010, when a close correspondence with the family began, in particular with Rossana Celentano, Angela's sister. The girl, named Celeste Ruiz Tellez, said she had been adopted some time ago and sent a series of photos to reassure them about her health, and for her parents, a hope opened up. A plausible lead for the family members who temporarily lost contact, after Celeste expressed several times the desire, not to be searched for because she was happy living in Acapulco.

The Mexican prosecutor's office then offered a reward of 3 million pesos to look for her, then she was identified and went to Italy to be interrogated by the Torre Annunziata prosecutor's office and initially claimed to be Celeste Ruiz.

The story ended in 2017 when she recanted and said her name was Brissia and claimed that a photo of her from 2002 had been stolen from her profile. She finally underwent a DNA test which definitively confirmed that she was not Angela Celentano.

=== The Turkish trail ===
In 2023 the GIP of Naples decided to extend the investigations for six months on a trail that led to Turkey after a woman in 2009 revealed in confidence to a parish priest that in 1996 she had been kidnapped and taken to the island of Büyükada near Istanbul where she lived with a man she considered her father. The woman visited the island ten years later pretending to be a tourist who brought her to a man, Fahfi Bey; however, the Turkish police interrogated the wrong man.

=== The Venezuelan trail ===
In February 2023, a model 90% with similar looks to Angela Celentano was found in Venezuela but the DNA test was negative.

== See also ==
- Persone scomparse
- Disappearance of Denise Pipitone
- Monte Faito
