= 2021 in Italian television =

This is a list of Italian television related events from 2021.

== Events ==
- 6 March – the pop rock band Måneskin win the 2021 edition of Sanremo.
- 25 March – Stefano Bronzato wins the eleventh season of Italia's Got Talent.
- 1 May – Concerto del Primo Maggio May Day rock concert broadcast live on Rai 3.
- 22 May – Italy, represented in 2021 by the Måneskin, wins the Eurovision Song Contest 2021 in Rotterdam, Amsterdam.

== Debuts ==
=== Rai ===
- A grande richiesta, a television musical variety aired in the early evening of Saturday, on Rai 1.
- Canzone segreta, a television program broadcast on Rai 1.The program is the Italian adaptation of the French program La Chanson Secrète.
- Ciao Maschio, a television program, broadcast on Rai 1.
- Game of Games - Gioco Loco, a game show genre television program broadcast on Rai 2.
- La musica che gira intorno, a television variety music broadcast in prime time on Rai 1.
- La caserma, a docu-reality television program, broadcast in prime time on Rai 2.
- Domani è domenica, a talk show television program, broadcast on Rai 2.
- Ti sento, a television program broadcast on Rai 2.
- Magazzini musicali, a musical program broadcast on Rai 2 and replicated on Rai Radio 2 and Rai 4.
- Via dei Matti n°0, a musical television program broadcast on Rai 3.

=== Mediaset ===
- Felicissima sera, a variety and entertainment television program, broadcast on Canale 5.
- Zona bianca, a talk show, political and rotogravure television program, broadcast on Rete 4.
- Salotto Salemi, a program on the internet platform broadcast on the Mediaset Play portal.

=== Netflix ===
- Fate: The Winx Saga, a teen drama series based on the Nickelodeon animated series Winx Club, created by Iginio Straffi.

=== Prime Video ===
- LOL - Chi ride è fuori, a comedy show based on the LOL format.

=== Sky ===
- In compagnia del lupo - Il cuore nero delle fiabe, a television program conducted by Carlo Lucarelli, broadcast on the Sky Arte channel.
- Crimini da copertina, a documentary television program broadcast on TV8.
- Scemi da matrimonio, a television program broadcast on TV8.

=== Discovery ===
- Bake Off Italia - Dolci sotto un tetto, the Italian edition of Bake Off, aired on Real Time.
- Micromostri con Barbascura X, a television program broadcast on DMAX.

== Television shows ==
=== 1990s ===
- Le Iene (1997–present)

=== 2000s ===
- Grande Fratello (2000–present)
- C'è posta per te (2000–present)
- Amici di Maria De Filippi (2001–present)
- Otto e mezzo (2002–present)
- L'isola dei famosi (2003–present)
- Ballando con le stelle (2005–present)
- X Factor (2008–present)

=== 2010s ===
- Italia's Got Talent (2010–present)
- Temptation Island (2014–present)
- Dimartedì (2014–present)

=== 2020s ===
- Il cantante mascherato (2020–present)
- Top Dieci (2020–present)

== Ending this year ==
- Ricette all'italiana (2010–2021), a tourist and cooking television program broadcast on Rete 4.
- Viaggio nella grande bellezza (2019–2021), a documentary television program broadcast on Canale 5.

== Networks and services ==
=== Launches ===
Network	Type	Launch date	Notes	Source
Byoblu	Cable and satellite	25 April		

=== Conversions and rebrandings ===
Old network name	New network name	Type	Conversion Date	Notes	Source

=== Closures ===
Network	Type	Closure date	Notes	Source

== Deaths ==
Date	Name	Age
7 January	Solange	68
16 February	Claudio Sorrentino	75
18 February	Guido Stagnaro	95
19 February	Luigi Albertelli	86
26 March	Enzo Spaltro	91
28 March	Enrico Vaime	84
