= Emanuele Chiapasco =

Italian baseball player and sporting director (1930–2021)

- Born: 27 July 1930
- Died: 1 January 2021 (aged 90); Como, Italy

Teams
- Milano Baseball Club

Emanuele Chiapasco (27 July 1930 – 1 January 2021) was an Italian baseball player, sporting director, and entrepreneur. He was one of the pioneers of Italian baseball and was CEO of department store chain Standa.
