= Orietta Grossi =

Italian basketball player (1959–2024)

Personal information
- Nationality: Italian
- Born: 20 June 1959; Rome, Italy
- Died: 18 January 2024 (aged 64)

Sport
- Sport: Basketball

Orietta Grossi (20 June 1959 – 18 January 2024) was an Italian basketball player. She competed in the women's tournament at the 1980 Summer Olympics. Grossi died in January 2024, at the age of 64.
