= Zura Karuhimbi =

Rwandan woman who saved over 100 people from being killed by Hutu militias

- Born: c. 1925; Gitarama, Rwanda-Burundi
- Died: 17 December 2018 (approximately aged 93); Musamo, Ruhango District, Rwanda
- Occupation: Traditional healer
- Known for: Safeguarding more than 100 refugees during the Rwandan genocide

Zura Karuhimbi (c. 1925 – 17 December 2018) was a Rwandan woman who saved more than 100 people from being killed by Hutu militias during the 1994 Genocide Against the Tutsi in Rwanda . A traditional healer, she hid the refugees in her house and deterred attackers by exaggerating her reputation as a witch. Her role was recognized in 2006 by the award of the Campaign Against Genocide Medal by Rwandan President Paul Kagame.

== Early life ==
Karuhimbi's birth date is not known – some sources state circa 1909 but she is thought to have been born around 1925 which was the date stated on her state identity card. Her family were traditional healers in the village of Musamo in Ruhango District, around an hour's drive from the nation's capital of Kigali. Karuhimbi also became a healer and gained a reputation for having magical powers. During the Rwandan Revolution she witnessed violence between the ruling minority Tutsis and the more numerous Hutu tribe. She later claimed that in 1959 she had saved the life of a two-year-old Tutsi boy by tying beads from her necklace into his hair so that he could pass as a girl and escape execution by the Hutus. Karuhimbi claimed that the boy grew up to become Rwandan president Paul Kagame.

== 1994 genocide ==
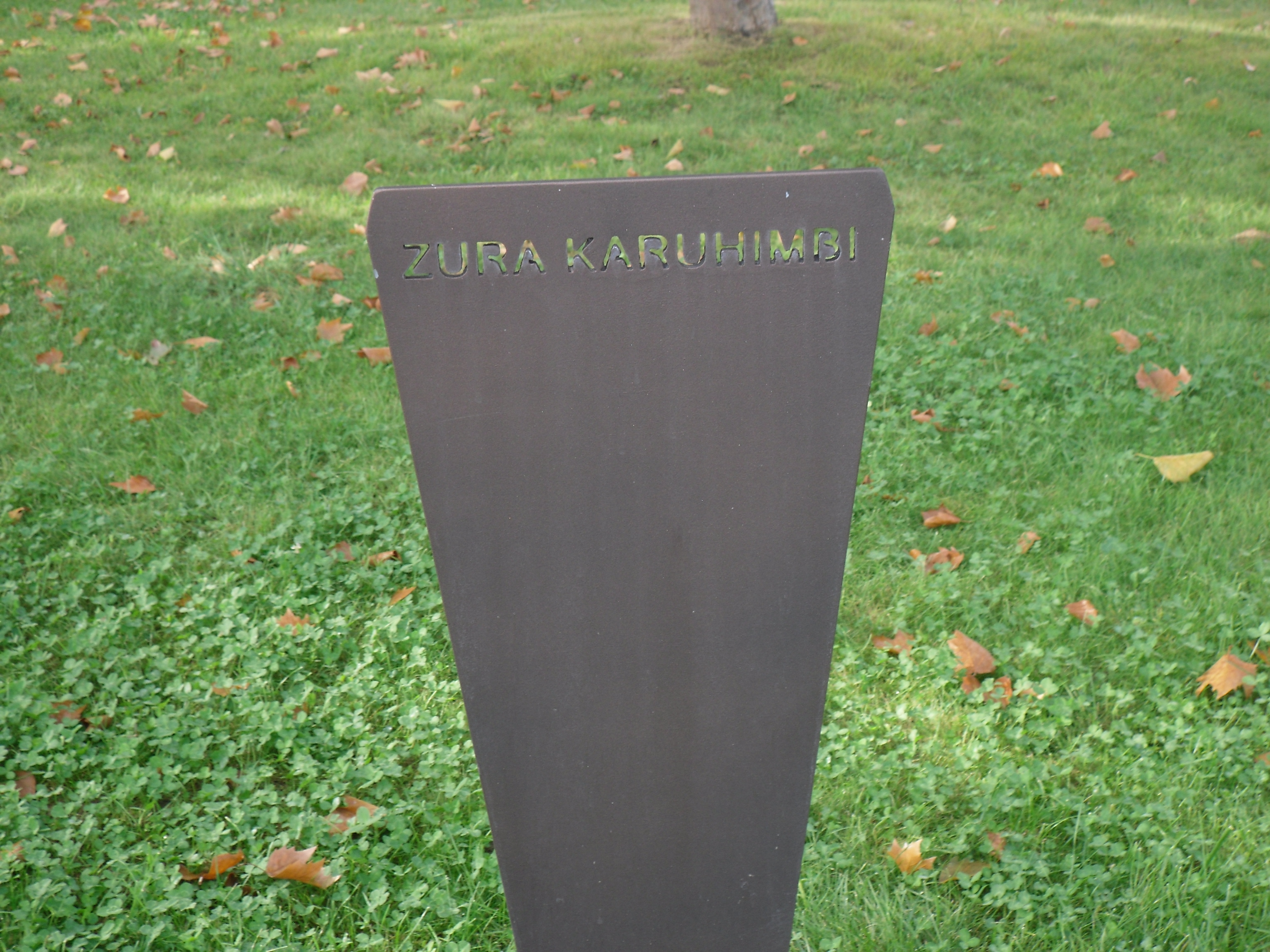
Stele dedicated to Zura Karuhimbi at the Garden of the Righteous of the World in Padua, Italy.

At the time of the 1994 Rwandan genocide, a resurgence of tribal violence that killed more than 800,000 people, Karuhimbi was an elderly widow. She helped Tutsis as well as Burundians and three Europeans to hide from roving Hutu militias. Karuhimbi hid the refugees inside her two-room house, and possibly in a hole in her fields. In all she saved more than 100 people, including babies that she rescued from the arms of their dead mothers.

To deter the Hutu militias Karuhimbi cultivated a reputation for being possessed by evil spirits. To maintain her appearances as a "witch" she painted herself and her house with natural herbs that, when touched, acted as an irritant. Karuhimbi claimed her house was inhabited by ghosts, and threatened that those who tried to enter would unleash evil spirits and the wrath of God upon themselves. She emphasised her warnings by jangling her bracelet-laden arms and threatening that if any refugees were killed inside her house then the murderers would be "digging their own graves". The militia attempted to bribe Karuhimbi to allow them access to her home but she refused. All those that sheltered with Karuhimbi survived the genocide.

== Later life ==
Ribbon of the Campaign Against Genocide Medal

After the genocide, Karuhimbi stated that she was a practising muslim and that her witchcraft activities were only a means of deterring attack. In 2006 she was awarded Rwanda's Campaign Against Genocide Medal by President Paul Kagame. Karuhimbi subsequently wore the medal at all times, placing it beneath her pillow whilst she slept. In her later years she continued to live in the same house she had used to shelter refugees despite it crumbling with age. Poverty-stricken, she was cared for by a niece. Karuhimbi died at her home on 17 December 2018.
