= La musica che gira intorno =

- Genre: Music
- Directed by: Duccio Forzano
- Presented by: Fiorella Mannoia
- Country of origin: Italy
- Original language: Italian
- No. of seasons: 1
- No. of episodes: 2

Production
- Production companies: RAI, Friends & Partners

Original release
- Network: Rai 1

La musica che gira intorno is an Italian television musical variety broadcast in prime time on Rai 1 for two episodes on 15 and 22 January 2021 from Teatro 1 of Cinecittà World, conducted by Fiorella Mannoia.

== Episodes ==
Broadcasting	Guests	Viewers	Share
15 January 2021	Claudio Baglioni, Alessandro Siani, Amadeus, Francesco De Gregori, Antonello Venditti, Giorgio Panariello, Marco Mengoni, Marco Giallini, Giorgia, Edoardo Leo, Andrea Bocelli, Sabrina Impacciatore, Achille Lauro, Gigi D'Alessio, Ambra Angiolini, Samuele Bersani, Flavio Insinna, Ligabue	3.998.000	17,00%
22 January 2021	Giorgia, Marco D'Amore, Alessandra Amoroso, Alessio Boni, Emma, Massimo Ghini, Ornella Vanoni, Vinicio Marchioni, Brunori Sas, Carlo Conti, Silvio Orlando, Tosca, Tommaso Paradiso, Pinguini Tattici Nucleari, Francesco De Gregori, Antonello Venditti, Riccardo Cocciante, Zucchero	3.796.000	16,80%
Average		3.897.000	16,90%
