= Michele Zolla =

Italian government official and politician (1932–2024)

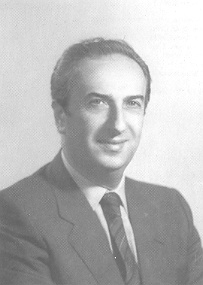

Member of the Chamber of Deputies of Italy for Turin
- In office 20 May 1972 – 22 April 1992

Personal details
- Born: 2 July 1932 Armeno, Italy
- Died: 1 January 2024 (aged 91) Rome, Italy
- Party: DC
- Occupation: Government official

Michele Zolla (2 July 1932 – 1 January 2024) was an Italian government official and politician. A member of Christian Democracy, he served in the Chamber of Deputies from 1972 to 1992.

Zolla died in Rome on 1 January 2024, at the age of 91.
