= 2022 Ischia landslide =

2022 natural disaster in Italy

- Landslide (Campania) Landslide (Italy)
- Date: 26 November 2022
- Time: Around 03:00 IST (UTC+01:00)
- Location: Ischia, Campania, Italy; 40.75°N 13.91°E
- Type: Landslide
- Deaths: 12
- Injuries: 5

Heavy rain hit the island of Ischia, located in the Tyrrhenian Sea, causing damage to the comune of Casamicciola Terme. Twelve people were killed and five others were injured.

== Background ==
This was the second natural disaster in Italy in the fall of 2022, after eleven people were killed by flash floods in the central region of Marche in September after torrential rains due to Storm Ana. The area has also seen disasters in the past, with an earthquake in 2017 and seventy-two landslides were registered between 2018 and 2021.

On the Island there is a known problem of illegally built buildings, which have been blamed for exacerbating the damages of natural disasters. Local administrators have disputed this thesis, highlighting instead the lack of care of the land by the competent authorities. Based on the statistics published by the Italian environmentalist association Legambiente in its report "Ecomafie 2017", on the island there were 600 buildings with an active demolition order and the citizens of the Island have issued more than 27'000 Tax amnesty requests related to illegally built or renovated buildings ("condono edilizio").

== Landslide ==
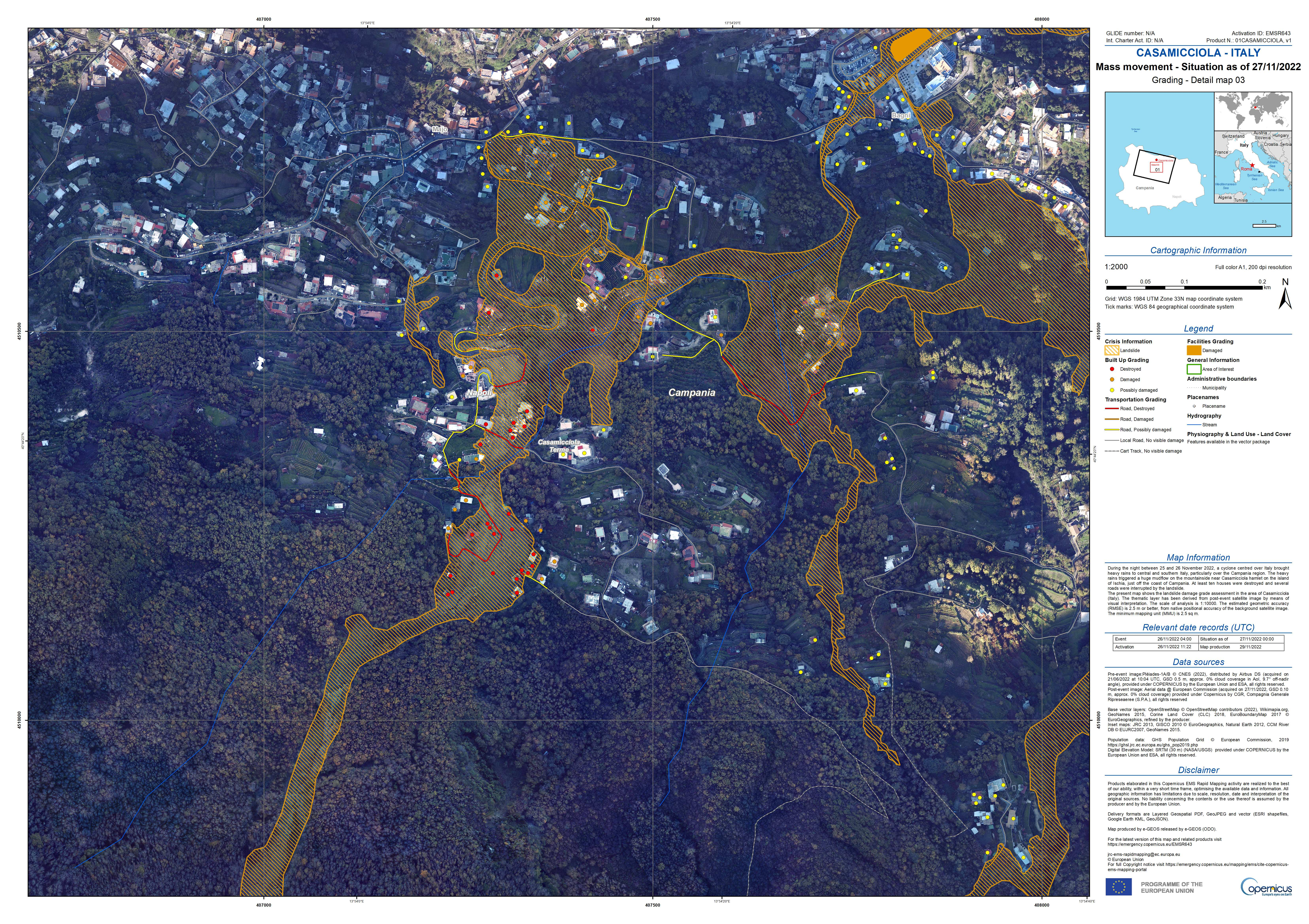
Aerial view of the damages caused by the landslide

More than 209 evacuated from the area where the landslide occurred. The torrential rain damaged cars, buildings, and roads. Over seventy firefighters contributed to the search and rescue of civilians on the island. Many worked by hand or with shovels as excavators could not be brought in immediately. Electricity had been cut off in the area and about 30 families were stuck in their homes in Lacco Ameno.

== Victims ==
Twelve people were killed during the landslide, including four children. One victim was found dead in the immediate aftermath, six others were found dead the next day, another two days later, three more five days later, and another ten days later. The victims were identified as two brothers and a sister (aged 11, 16 and 6) and their parents (aged 37 and 31); a couple aged 32 and 30 and their 22-day-old baby; a 31-year-old woman and her 31-year-old male partner; a 58-year-old Bulgarian woman; and a 31-year-old woman. Around 230 residents of the island were displaced.

== Response ==
On 27 November, Prime Minister Giorgia Meloni's Cabinet declared a state of emergency for the area and approved €2 million in funds for recovery and rescue operations. The next day, Fabrizio Curcio the head of Italy's Civil Protection Department warned that at least 94% of Italian municipalities are at risk of flooding, landslides and coastal erosion.

Some locals felt that the emergency funding is too little, too late. They raised claims that after the 2009 landslide that they were promised to make the area more secure, and that officials knew of the risks but did nothing to make the area more secure.

== See also ==
- Weather of 2022
- Storm Denise – the European windstorm partially responsible for triggering the landslide
