= Bruno Segre =

Italian lawyer, journalist and politician (1918–2024)

Bruno Segre (4 September 1918 – 27 January 2024) was an Italian lawyer, journalist, politician, and partisan.

== Early life ==
Segre was born in Turin on 4 September 1918. He was a student of Luigi Einaudi, graduating in law with a thesis dedicated to Benjamin Constant, founder of liberalism. Due to laws at the time, his Jewish ancestry prevented him from practicing law.

On 21 December 1942, he was arrested for political defeatism and spent over three months in prison, while his father was interned in Abruzzo. In 1943, he and his family moved to a small village in the Cuneo area between Busca, Caraglio and Dronero.

In September 1944 in Turin, Segre attempted to escape arrest by the National Republican Guard. A shootout ensued, from which he saved himself thanks to the metal cigarette case he carried in his jacket, which blocked the bullet. However, he was captured and sent to the barracks in Via Asti and then transferred to the Le Nuove judicial prison, from which he escaped some time later by bribing a U.P.I. official. In the summer of 1946, he wrote a memoir dedicated to the events of his prison experience, which he published in 2013.

He was a Freemason of the Grand Orient of Italy.

== Career ==
Segre worked as a reporter at the liberal newspaper "L'Opinione", which replaced "La Stampa". It is in this position that he met Alcide De Gasperi, Ferruccio Parri, Gaetano Salvemini, Piero Calamandrei, Leo Valiani, and Giuliano Vassalli.

From 1975 to 1980, he was group leader of the Italian Socialist Party in the Turin City Council, but left the party at the time of Bettino Craxi; from 1980 to 1990, he was effective president of the San Paolo Banking Institute of Turin and director of various companies owned by the institute.

Segre was president of the Turin provincial Federation of the National Association of Italian Anti-Fascist Political Persecuted People (ANPPIA), honorary president of the National Association of Free Thought "Giordano Bruno" (of whose official body, Libero Pensiero, he was director for years) and honorary president of the Turin council for the secularity of institutions. He was also vice-president of the Turin Cremation Society (SOCREM), after having been president of the Italian Federation of SOCREM for 40 years, founder and director of the magazine "L'ara".

Segre was awarded honorary citizenship by the municipalities of Bollengo, Sarzana and Giaveno.

Segre died in Turin on 27 January 2024 at the age of 105.
