= Dino Felisetti =

Italian politician (1919–2021)

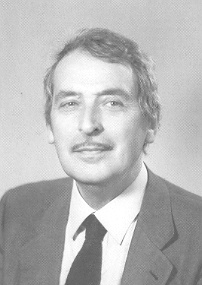

Member of the Chamber of Deputies of Italy
- In office 25 May 1972 – 1 July 1987
- Constituency: Parma-Modena

Personal details
- Born: Luigi Dino Felisetti; 23 September 1919 Modena, Italy
- Died: 20 October 2021 (aged 102) Reggio Emilia, Italy
- Party: PSI

Luigi Dino Felisetti (23 September 1919 – 20 October 2021) was an Italian politician. A member of the Italian Socialist Party, he served in the Chamber of Deputies from 1972 to 1987. A long-time lawyer, he was a member of the Higher Council of the Judiciary from 1988 to 1990. As a representative of the Socialist Party, he was councillor for urban planning and deputy mayor of Reggio, provincial secretary of the party, and, beginning in 1972, a deputy for 18 years.
