= Paola Marella =

Italian television presenter (1963–2024)

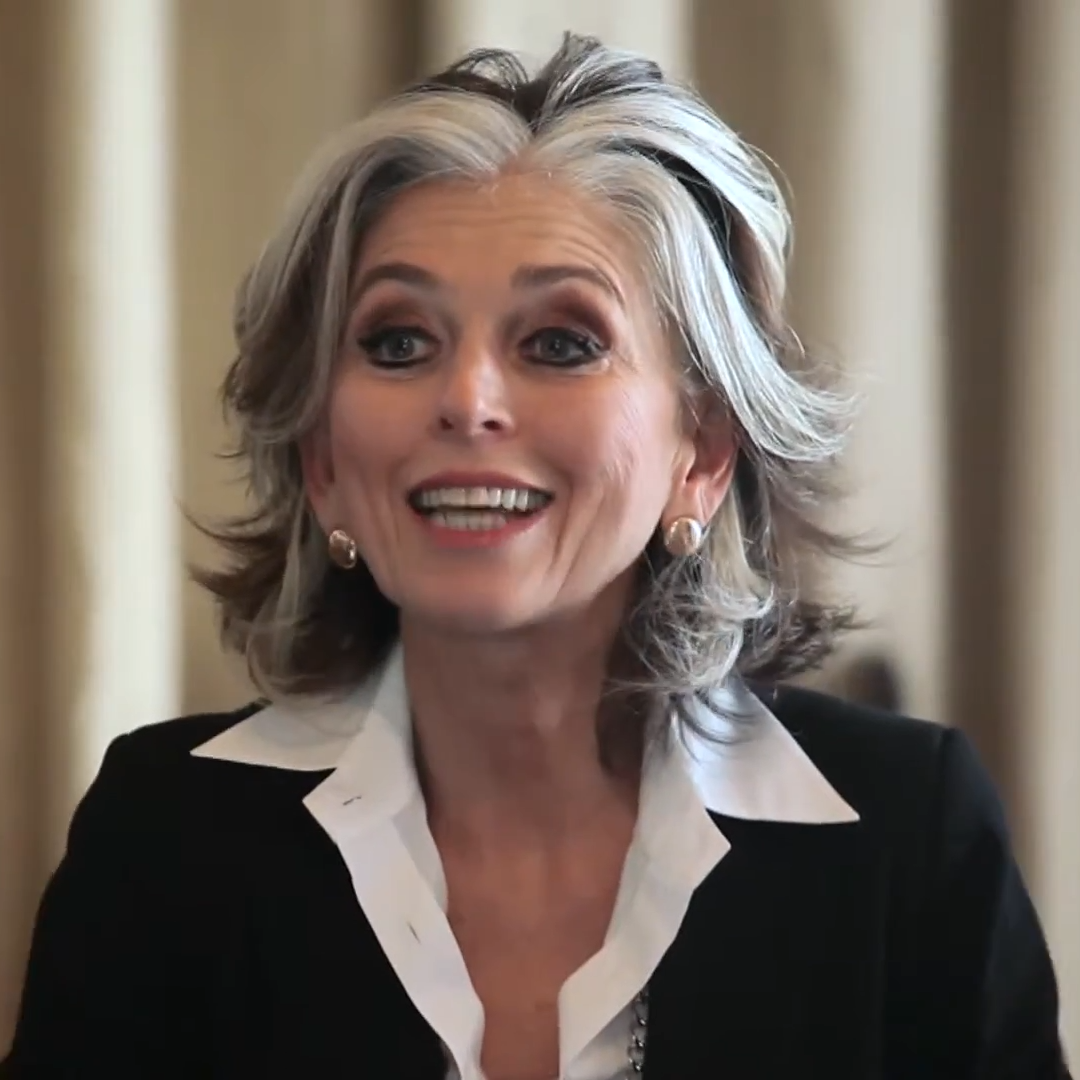
- Marella in 2016
- Born: 16 February 1963; Milan, Italy
- Died: 21 September 2024 (aged 61); Milan, Italy
- Occupations: Architect, designer, television presenter

Paola Maria Marella (16 February 1963 – 21 September 2024) was an Italian architect, designer and television presenter.

== Biography ==
Born in Milan, she attended classical high school and graduated in 1988 in interior design at the Faculty of Architecture of the Polytechnic University of Milan. She began her career as a real estate agent as an employee in a group that at the time managed real estate subdivisions. After a few years this company had some problems, so in 1993 she decided to open a company together with the sales director of the group she was working for at the time.

In 2006 she became one of the original personalities of the newly formed television channel Real Time, first hosting the programme Cerco casa disperatamente and continuing in 2009 with the programme Vendo casa disperatamente. In 2013 she was the presenter of two other Real Time programs, Welcome Style and Shopping Night: Home Edition, the latter together with Max Viola.

In 2011 she started a collaboration with the cultural association Luoghi di Relazione, holding courses for the training of the professional figure of the Home Stager. In 2012 she became an honorary member of HSP Association of Home Staging professionals. Between 2014 and 2015 she hosted the programs Hotel Cercasi and Changing Room , always on Real Time. She also curated columns for La Cucina Italiana.

In 2016 she left Discovery to join Sky Italia, where she began hosting the program I Consigli di Paola on Cielo. Later in 2017 she held a fashion column called Paola Marella: Migliora il tuo Armadio for the talk show The Real on TV8.

From 2016 to 2021 she was a member of the FIMAA board of directors of the Association of Real Estate Agents in the field of home staging and real estate services for Milan and Brianza.

From 2019 to 2022 she presented A te le chiavi on the LA7 television network, while in 2019 she hosted the first edition of Un sogno in affitto for Sky Uno, re-proposed from 2021 to 2023. In 2023 she returned to collaborate on the Discovery HGTV television channel with the interior design programme Come la vorrei.

In 2011 she was diagnosed with breast cancer. She seemed to have overcome the tumour, but in 2020 she discovered that she had a benign nodule again. In 2021 she was diagnosed with pancreatic cancer that had already become metastatic. Paola Marella died on 21 September 2024 in Milan, at the San Raffaele Hospital, at the age of 61, due to the consequences of the disease she was suffering from. The funeral took place two days later in the church of San Marco in the Brera district of Milan.

== Philanthropy ==
She sponsored with her image campaigns for charitable activities such as ActionAid, Chicco di felicità, Italian Multiple Sclerosis Association (AISM) and Dynamo Camp.

== Personal life ==
She was married and had a son, Nicola, born in 1995.

== Television programmes ==
- Cerco casa disperatamente (Real Time, 2006–2013)
- Vendo casa disperatamente (Real Time, 2009–2015)
- Welcome Style (Real Time, 2013)
- Shopping Night: Home Edition (Real Time, 2013–2015)
- Hotel Cercasi (Real Time, 2014)
- Changing Rooms - Camera a sorpresa (Real Time, 2014–2015)
- I Consigli di Paola (Cielo, 2016)
- The Real (TV8, 2017)
- A te le chiavi (LA7, 2019–2022)
- Un sogno in affitto (Sky Uno, 2019, 2021–2023)
- Alessandro Borghese - Celebrity Chef (TV8, 2022) – concorrente
- Come la vorrei (HGTV, 2023)

== Advertising campaigns ==
- Advertising campaign for Pantene (2018)
- Testimonials for Easy Renovation (2018–2023)
- Collaboration as a designer with Tempo (2021)

== Publications ==
- Arredo Casa Disperatamente. Rizzoli. 2011.
- Welcome style. Rizzoli. 2013.
