= Maria Giacobbe =

Italian-Danish writer (1928–2024)

Maria Giacobbe (14 August 1928 – 27 January 2024) was an Italian-Danish writer. She died on 27 January 2024, at the age of 95.

== Publications ==
- Diario di una maestrina, Laterza, Milan 1957
- Piccole cronache, Bari, Laterza, 1961
- Male kronike, Ljubljana, Mladinska knjiga, 1963
- Il mare, Vallecchi, Firenze 1967
- Eurydike, Gyldendal, Copenhagen 1970
- Stemmer og breve fra den europæiske provins, Gyldendal, Copenhagen 1978
- Le radici, Edizioni della Torre, Cagliari 1977; 1979; 1996; Il Maestrale, Nuoro 2005
- Kald det så bare kærlighed: tre noveller, Gyldendal, Copenhagen 1986
- Gli arcipelaghi, Biblioteca del Vascello, Roma 1995; Il Maestrale, Nuoro 2001
- Maschere e angeli nudi: ritratto d'infanzia, Il Maestrale, Nuoro 1999.
- Scenari d'esilio. Quindici parabole, Il Maestrale, Nuoro 2003
- Pòju Luàdu, Il Maestrale, Nuoro 2005
- Chiamalo pure amore, Il Maestrale, Nuoro 2008
- Euridice, Il Maestrale, Nuoro 2011
