= Anna Cataldi =

Italian journalist, writer, and film producer (1939–2021)

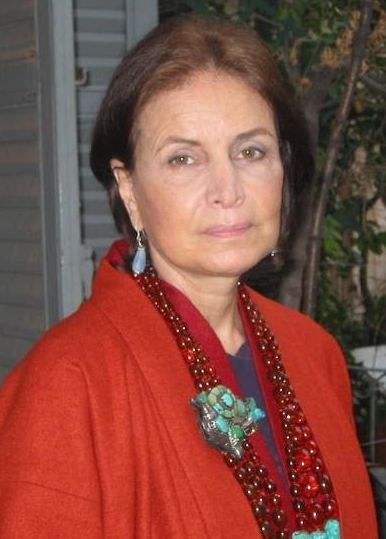
- Born: Anna Margherita Cataldi; 14 November 1939; Turin, Italy
- Died: 1 September 2021 (aged 81)
- Occupations: Writer, journalist, humanitarian, film producer

Anna Margherita Cataldi (14 November 1939 – 1 September 2021) was an Italian humanitarian, journalist, film producer, and author of several books.

She is known for having been executive producer for the Academy Award-winning Out of Africa, Goodwill Ambassador for the World Health Organization and one of the original United Nations Messengers of Peace, a position she retained between 1998 and 2006.

== Early life and education ==
Cataldi was born in Turin. She attended the Liceo Artistico di Torino and then the Polytechnic University of Turin, where she studied in the Faculty of Architecture.

== Out of Africa ==
Starting in 1981, Anna Cataldi travelled to Denmark and Kenya to research the life of the writer Karen Blixen. This process lasted three years, at the end of which she wrote an original treatment for a movie based on Blixen's memoir Out of Africa, published using the pen name Isak Dinesen. In 1984, Columbia Pictures purchased the treatment from Cataldi and in 1985 she was associate producer for the Oscar-winning film Out of Africa, directed by Sydney Pollack and starring Meryl Streep and Robert Redford.

== Humanitarian work ==
=== Somalia ===
In September 1992, Anna Cataldi went on her first humanitarian mission with her good friend, actress and UNICEF Goodwill Ambassador Audrey Hepburn. Together they travelled to Somalia, which was suffering from a major drought. Cataldi's first of many humanitarian missions was Hepburn's last, as she died early the following year.

=== Sarajevo ===
After returning from Somalia, Cataldi obtained a job at Italian magazine Panorama as a war correspondent from Sarajevo, which was under siege at the time. After reporting on the events in 1992, she was appointed UNICEF International Media Consultant, a position she held between 1993 and 1994, during which she travelled to Sarajevo several times.

=== Messenger of Peace ===
In 1998, newly appointed United Nations Secretary-General Kofi Annan made Cataldi one of the ten original United Nations Messengers of Peace. Annan presented the newly appointed Messengers of Peace by saying, "they are individuals who possess widely recognized talents in the field of arts, literature, music and sports, who have agreed to help focus worldwide attention on the work of the United Nations". In this ambassadorial role she travelled on missions to Rwanda, Burundi, Kenya, Sudan, Zambia, Afghanistan and Angola. Cataldi resigned from the post in 2006 after Kofi Annan left his position as secretary-general.

=== World Health Organization ===
In 2007 Cataldi became Goodwill Ambassador for the World Health Organization in the Stop TB programme. To raise awareness on the plight of tuberculosis, Cataldi travelled to Afghanistan, Pakistan, Angola, Zambia, South Africa, Algeria, Morocco and Jordan during her time as ambassador. She left the World Health Organization and the United Nations in 2011.

=== ECRE ===
After leaving the United Nations, Cataldi was nominated Goodwill Ambassador for the European Council on Refugees and Exiles, known as ECRE. In her two-year stay she travelled to Hungary, Malta, Tunisia and Libya. During this period of time and following 2012, when she left ECRE, Cataldi became increasingly involved with issue regarding refugees, as well as the fate of the countries recovering from the Arab Spring. She in fact travelled to Tunisia in 2015 to report on the political situation for the Italian magazine F. There, she interviewed several prominent women, some of whom were part of the Tunisian National Dialogue Quartet, which later won the Nobel Peace Prize.

=== Crimes of War Project ===
Cataldi was also one of the founders of the Crimes of War Project, together with five others including previous chief prosecutor at Guantanamo Bay Col. Morris Davis. For more than ten years Cataldi was involved in promoting the project and she was still a member of the board of directors, which is "dedicated to raising public awareness of the laws of war and their application to situations of armed conflict".

== Publications ==
=== Periodicals and newspapers ===
Anna Cataldi contributed to the following newspapers and magazines during her journalistic career: El País, Panorama, Epoca, La Repubblica, L'Espresso, La Stampa, La Règle du Jeu, The Nation, Rolling Stone, The International Herald Tribune, Front Line, and UN Chronicle.
