= Gianpaolo Ormezzano =

Italian sports journalist and writer (1935–2024)

Gianpaolo Ormezzano (17 September 1935 – 26 December 2024) was an Italian sports journalist, writer and television personality.

== Life and career ==
Gianpaolo Ormezzano was born in Turin on 17 September 1935. Informally named GPO (the acronym of his name), he was the editor of the Turinese sports newspaper Tuttosport, columnist of the sports magazine Guerin Sportivo, the Turinese newspaper La Stampa and the Catholic magazine Famiglia Cristiana, writer of the children's magazine Il Giornalino, and commentator of many TV programs as a guest sports journalist. Across his life he was always a strong supporter of the Torino FC Italian football club.

Gianpaolo Ormezzano was especially fond of Italian football, but also of cyclism (he reported the death of the legendary cyclist Fausto Coppi), of Olympics games, and of sport in general: in year 1974 he interviewed Muhammad Ali in Kinshasa, capital of the Democratic Republic of the Congo (at the time named Zaire). He also followed and documented the historical event of the first Man's landing on the Moon in July 1969 from Cape Canaveral. In private life he was married with three children.

Ormezzano died in Turin on 26 December 2024, at the age of 89.
