= Alberto Tanasini =

Italian Roman Catholic prelate (1945–2024)

His Excellency Alberto Tanasini
- Bishop Emeritus of Chiavari
- Metropolis: Genoa
- Appointed: 20 March 2004
- Term ended: 10 April 2021
- Predecessor: Alberto Maria Careggio
- Successor: Giampio Luigi Devasini
- Previous posts: Auxiliary Bishop of Genova and Titular Bishop of Suelli (1996–2004)

Orders
- Ordination: 1 March 1969 by Giuseppe Siri
- Consecration: 14 September 1996 by Dionigi Tettamanzi

Personal details
- Born: 6 August 1945 Ravenna, Italy
- Died: 24 January 2024 (aged 78) Lavagna, Italy
- Motto: COGNOVIMUS ET CREDIDIMUS CARITATI
- Coat of arms

Styles of Alberto Tanasini
- Reference style: His Excellency; The Most Reverend
- Spoken style: Your Excellency
- Religious style: Bishop

Alberto Tanasini (6 August 1945 – 24 January 2024) was an Italian Roman Catholic prelate. He was the auxiliary bishop of Genoa from 1996 to 2004 and bishop of Chiavari from 2004 to 2021. Tanasini died on 24 January 2024, at the age of 78.

Catholic Church titles
Preceded by Alberto Maria Careggio	Bishop of Chiavari; 2004–2021	Succeeded by Giampio Luigi Devasini
Preceded by Leo Joseph Brust	Titular Bishop of Suelli; 1996–2004	Succeeded by Ramón Castro Castro
Preceded by —	Auxiliary Bishop of Genoa; 1996–2004	Succeeded by —
