= Attilio Busseti =

Italian politician (1933–2024)

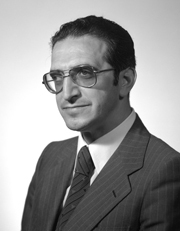
- Busseti in 1976

Member of the Senate of the Republic of Italy for Molfetta
- In office 2 July 1987 – 22 April 1992
- In office 5 July 1976 – 11 July 1983

Personal details
- Born: 24 May 1933 Andria, Italy
- Died: 19 January 2024 (aged 90) Rome, Italy
- Party: DC
- Occupation: Lawyer

Attilio Busseti (24 May 1933 – 19 January 2024) was an Italian lawyer and politician. A member of Christian Democracy, he served in the Senate of the Republic from 1976 to 1983 and again from 1987 to 1992.

Busseti died in Rome on 19 January 2024, at the age of 90.
