= 2021 Ardea shooting =

Shooting in Lazio, Italy

Ardea shooting
- Location: 41.549599°N 12.584055°E; Viale Corona Boreale, Colle Romito, Ardea, Lazio, Italy
- Date: 13 June 2021; ~11:00 am GMT+2
- Attack type: Shooting
- Weapon: 7.65mm Beretta 81 pistol
- Deaths: 4 (including the perpetrator)
- Perpetrator: Andrea Pignani

The Ardea shooting was a shooting that occurred on 13 June 2021, in Colle Romito, Ardea, Lazio, Italy.

== Shooting ==
On the morning of 13 June 2021, at about 11:00 am (GMT+2), a man opened fire at a local park located on Via Corona Boreale in Ardea. He targeted random civilians who were passing through the area. A total of three people were shot, all of whom died: an elderly man on a bicycle who was killed at the scene, and two children who died after being admitted to a hospital. A fourth person was also targeted but escaped unharmed. The attacker fled the scene and barricaded himself at his home before committing suicide.

== Perpetrator ==
The attacker was identified as 35-year-old Andrea Pignani, a local resident. Pignani suffered from mental health problems, and was known for previous crimes and threats, including one where he threatened his mother with a knife. The gun used in the shooting was owned by his father, a former security guard, who died months prior to the incident. All the victims were targeted at random and had no connection to the attacker.
