= Pietro Omodeo =

Italian biologist (1919–2024)

Pietro Omodeo (27 September 1919 – 20 January 2024) was an Italian biologist. He died on 20 January 2024, at the age of 104.

== Publications ==
- Considerazioni sull'evoluzione dei vertebrati terrestri. Firenze: L'arte della stampa. 1964.
- Lezioni di biologia. Padova: Cortina. 1971.
- Storia naturale ed evoluzione. Le Scienze. 1979. ISBN 978-88-7004-038-8.
- Biologia (2 ed.). Torino: UTET. 1983. ISBN 978-88-02-03700-4.
- Creazionismo ed evoluzionismo. Laterza. 1984. ISBN 978-88-420-2452-1. Edizione 2022 a cura di Emilia Rota, Editrice Bibliografica, ISBN 8893575159.
- Dell'Antonio, Annamaria; Omodeo, Pietro; Negrin Saviolo, Nila (1984). Corso introduttivo alla psicologia fisiologica (2 ed.). Padova: Cortina. ISBN 978-88-7784-007-3.
- Biologia, con rabbia e con amore. Aracne. 1989. ISBN 978-88-7999-099-8.
- Gli abissi del tempo. Roma: Aracne. 2000.
- Alle origini delle scienze naturali (1492-1632). Catanzaro: Rubbettino. 2001. ISBN 978-88-7284-948-4.
- Evoluzione della cellula. Un approccio multidisciplinare. ETS. 2011. ISBN 978-88-467-2920-0.
- Amerigo Vespucci e l'annuncio del nuovo mondo, Artemide 2017
