= Disappearance of Denise Pipitone =

2004 missing child case in Italy

Locations
1 Mazara del Vallo where Pipitone was last seen.

Denise Pipitone (born October 26, 2000) is a missing Italian girl who disappeared on September 1, 2004, while she was near the house of her maternal grandmother in Mazara del Vallo.

== Disappearance ==
Denise Pipitone was the daughter of Piera Maggio and Pietro Pulizzi. However, on paper Tony Pipitone was listed as her legitimate father as he was married to Piera Maggio. At the time, Piera Maggio was unsure who fathered Denise. On the morning of September 1, 2004, Denise disappeared in front of her house in her birthplace of Mazara del Vallo. She was last seen by her aunt Giacoma (sister of Piera Maggio) at 11:45 am, on the sidewalk near the street. Denise was left on her own after her cousin went home for lunch. At the time of the disappearance, her mother was taking a computer course and learned of the incident at around 12:30 PM. The news spread through the local media at 2 pm, and quickly became a national case. Through the years, investigations pointed to abduction as a cause of her disappearance involving several anonymous individuals in order to put everyone off the track.

The search dogs of the investigation team perceived the presence of Denise near Gaspare Ghaleb's sister's property. Gaspare Ghaleb, at the time, was a fiancé of Jessica Pulizzi and is thought to be Denise's biological father. Gaspare Ghaleb's sister's property was only a few meters away from the apartment of Giacoma Maggio. Denise was last seen by her aunt in front of Giacoma Maggio's apartment. Jessica, at the time, was only 17 and was one of the main suspects in the abduction, along with her mother.

== Sightings ==
As a result of the disappearance, the research began immediately, although without any result for over a month.

Some sightings, both confirmed and unconfirmed, were subsequently reported:

- On October 18, 2004, in Milan, security guard Felice Grieco noticed a little girl, closely resembling Denise, accompanied by some gypsies, on the street in front of a bank, in Barona/Giambellino. The group of gypsies consisted of a dark-haired woman, a black man, a blond child with an accordion, and a blond woman. The guard managed to stop the group for a while and filmed the little girl. In the footage, the girl is referred to as "Danas" and is heard asking a woman «Where are you taking me?»; Grieco also claimed that this girl had a scratch on her cheek, a mark that Denise had at the time. According to some evaluations, the voice of "Danas" may be compatible with that of Denise and the accent is similar to Sicilian, supposedly the same as that of Mazara del Vallo.
- On December 3, 2004 Behgjet Pacolli, Swiss tycoon and entrepreneur of Albanian descent, and expert of resolutions in international kidnappings, having already collaborated on the release of some UN officials held hostage in Kabul, contacted the law firm of Giacomo Frazzitta, attorney for Piera Maggio, proposing himself as a collaborator to take the little girl back home. Pacolli volunteered to get in touch with the kidnappers through an advertising page on several national newspapers, a Swiss telephone number and an email address dedicated solely to the dealings with the captors. The law firm of Pacolli asked for the utmost confidentiality and secrecy on the identity of their client. At 8 pm Frazzitta submitted the authorization to the law firm of Pacolli, and at 10 pm Piera Maggio received an anonymous call, reporting that Denise was about to enter Switzerland through the French border. Frazzitta reported the event to the Public Prosecutor's Office, which immediately contacted the Swiss Gendarmerie, which in turn summoned Pacolli. This episode broke the confidential and exclusive relationship preferred by Pacolli, who mysteriously disappeared from the case.
- In September 2008, an Italian nurse on a holiday on the Greek island of Kos saw a child very similar to Denise. The girl apparently had the same age as Denise and was accompanied by an Albanian woman, who claimed to be her mother. A circumstance that raised suspicion was that the child spoke Italian, as opposed to her alleged mother; however, on September 12, 2008, the DNA test showed that the girl was not Denise Pipitone and was confirmed to be the daughter of the Albanian woman.
- On March 31, 2021, a Russian nurse, living in Val Seriana reported to the tv show Chi l'ha visto? of a twenty-eight-year old Russian girl, participating in the tv show Pust' govoryat (aired on Russian channel Pervyj kanal), who seemed to be resembling Piera Maggio. The girl is Olesya Rostova, whose name was given to her in an orphanage, claiming to have been abducted by gypsies when she was little and in search of her mother. On April 7, lawyer Giacomo Frazzitta and RAI correspondent Marc Innaro participated in the program: however the lawyer was informed that the blood type of Olesya Rostova was not compatible with that of Denise Pipitone. However he decided to inform the public prosecutor of Marsala anyway

During the years, various theories were presented the investigators, but the inquiries always focused within the family. The theory of gypsies was often a constant, but it was never confirmed, even though some speculate about a connection with the family: it seems plausible that the little girl was traded to nomadic groups or to someone in the circle of friends of the family.

On May 3, 2021, the public prosecutor of Marsala opened another investigation on the case and, on May 27, a new parliamentary committee of inquiry was requested by deputees Alessia Morani and Carmelo Miceli, members of the Democratic Party, to analyze potential false leads, conflicts of interest and anomalies in the previous 17 years of investigations. However the matter remained unchanged until December 20, the day when the investigating judge of Marsala dismissed the case.

== Trials ==
According to the last reconstruction of the prosecutors, Denise was abducted by Jessica Pulizzi, with the complicity of her mother, Anna Corona – to which Piero Pulizzi never confessed that Denise was his daughter, even though they suspected the fact – and of her ex-fiancé, Gaspare Ghaleb. The reason was «revenge and jealousy because Denise and Jessica Pulizzi are daughters of the same father, Piero Pulizzi». The inquiry into Anna Corona, under investigation in a second line of research for child abduction, was closed by the investigating judge of Marsala in December 2013.

Jessica Pulizzi, charged with complicity in kidnapping a minor, was arraigned by the preliminary hearing judge of Marsala, on January 18, 2010. The first instance trial began on March 16, 2010, lasting for over three years. The public prosecutor of Marsala recommended the sentence of 15 years of imprisonment for child abduction, deeming her "undoubtedly guilty" due to a series of clear, unambiguous and convergent clues. According to the indictment, on the morning of September 1, 2004, Pulizzi took Denise to the home of Piero Pulizzi to confirm that she was his daughter, but, not finding him, handed the child to unidentified people. However, upon completion of the trial, the woman was acquitted by the Court of Marsala, on June 27, 2013, for lack of evidence, and on October 2, 2015, the Court of Appeal of Palermo confirmed the acquittal, rejecting the request for the sentence to 15 years of imprisonment, asked by the head prosecutor of the Court of Appeal of Palermo, Rosalba Scaduto. Scaduto, during her indictment, claimed that Jessica Pulizzi had taken part in the abduction of Denise, and therefore should be found guilty. On April 19, 2017, the Court of Cassation confirmed the final acquittal of Jessica Pulizzi, but at the same time points to the existence of a valid and proven motive. At the end of the second-degree trial, the statute of limitations intervened against the charges of the co-defendant.
