= History of Italy =

Italy has been inhabited by humans since the Paleolithic. During antiquity, there were many peoples in the Italian peninsula, including Etruscans, Latins, Samnites, Umbri, Cisalpine Gauls, Greeks in Magna Graecia and others. Most significantly, Italy was the cradle of the Roman civilization. Rome was founded as a kingdom in 753 BC and became a republic in 509 BC. The Roman Republic then unified Italy forming a confederation of the Italic peoples and rose to dominate Western Europe, Northern Africa, and the Near East. The Roman Empire, established in 27 BC, ruled the Mediterranean region for centuries, contributing to the development of Western culture, philosophy, science and art.

During the early Middle Ages, Italy experienced the succession in power of Ostrogoths, Byzantines, Longobards and the Holy Roman Empire and fragmented into numerous city-states and regional polities, a situation that would remain until the unification of the country. These polities and the maritime republics, in particular Venice and Genoa, rose to prosperity. Eventually, the Italian Renaissance emerged and spread to the rest of Europe, bringing a renewed interest in humanism, science, exploration, and art with the start of the modern era. In the medieval and early modern era, Southern Italy was ruled by the Norman, Swabian and Angevin dynasties and the Aragonese, French and Spanish crowns. Central Italy was largely part of the Papal States.

In the 19th century, Italian unification led to the establishment of an Italian nation-state under the House of Savoy. The new Kingdom of Italy quickly modernized and built a colonial empire, controlling parts of Africa and countries along the Mediterranean. At the same time, Southern Italy remained rural and poor, originating the Italian diaspora. Victorious in World War I, Italy completed the unification by acquiring Trento and Trieste and gained a permanent seat in the League of Nations's executive council. The partial infringement of the Treaty of London (1915) led to the sentiment of a mutilated victory among radical nationalists, contributing to the rise of the fascist dictatorship of Benito Mussolini in 1922. During World War II, Italy was part of the Axis powers until the Italian surrender to Allied powers and its occupation by Nazi Germany with Fascist collaborators and then a co-belligerent of the Allies during the Italian resistance and liberation of Italy.

Following the end of the German occupation and the killing of Benito Mussolini, the 1946 Italian institutional referendum abolished the monarchy and became a republic, reinstated democracy, enjoyed an economic boom, and co-founded the European Union (Treaty of Rome), NATO, the Group of Six (later G7), and the G20.

== Prehistory ==
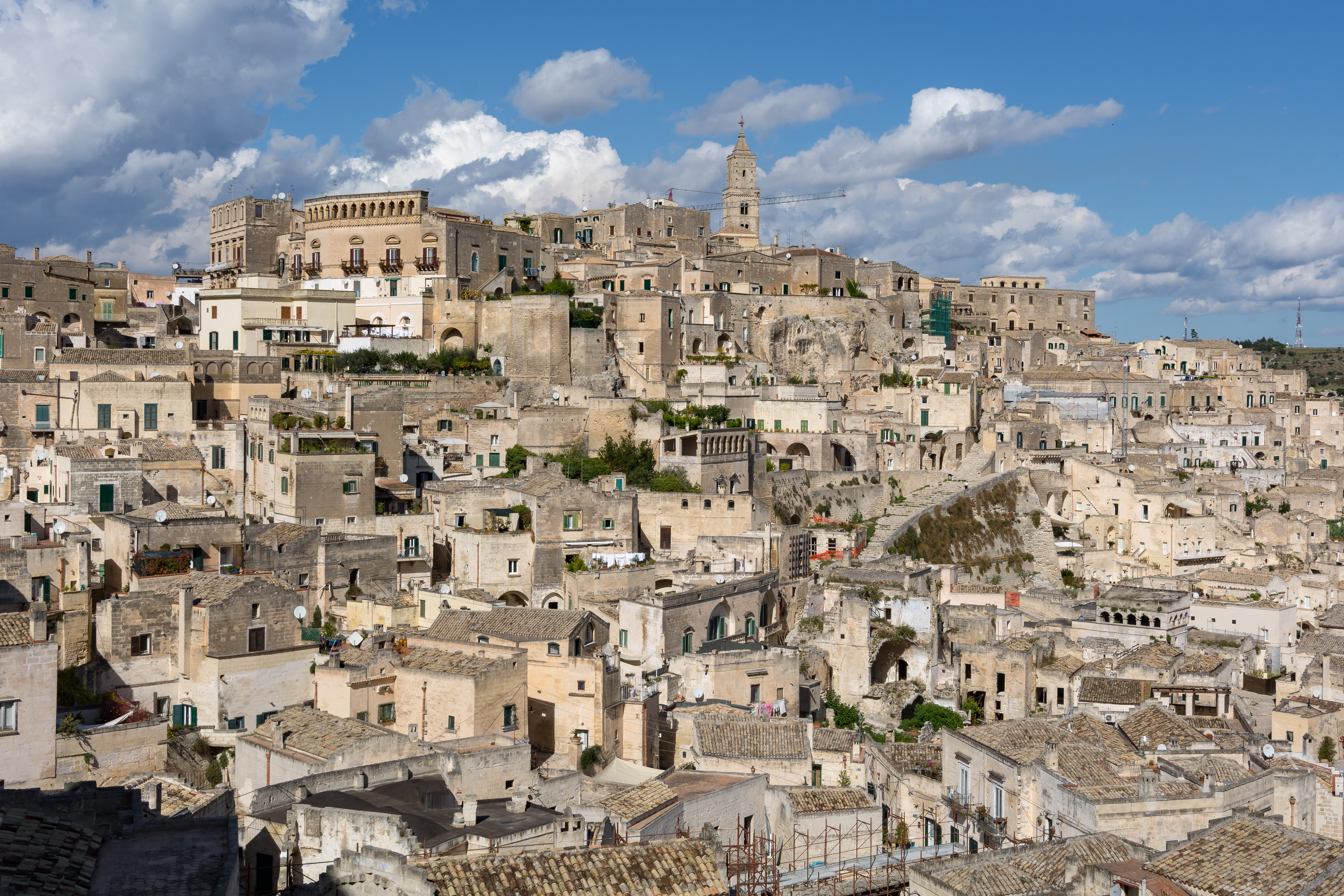
The Sassi cave houses of Matera are believed to be among the first human settlements in Italy, dating back to the Paleolithic.

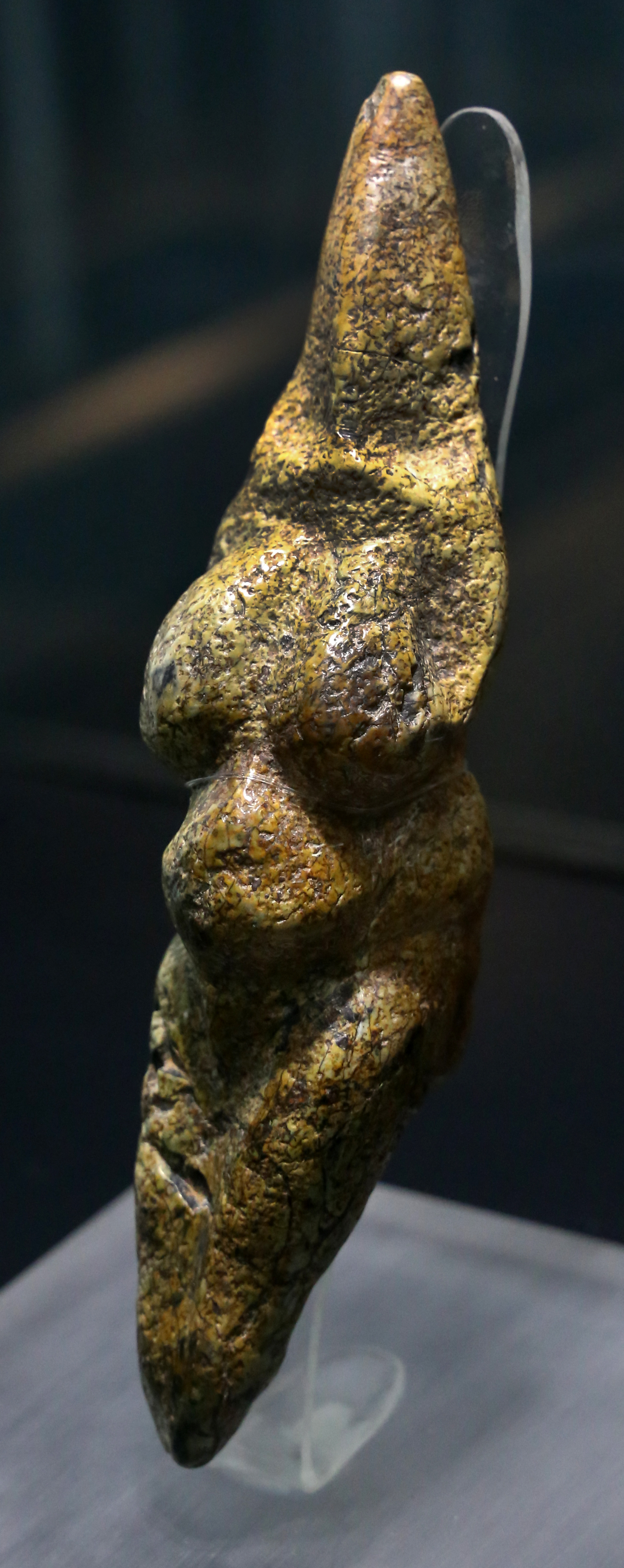
Venus of Savignano

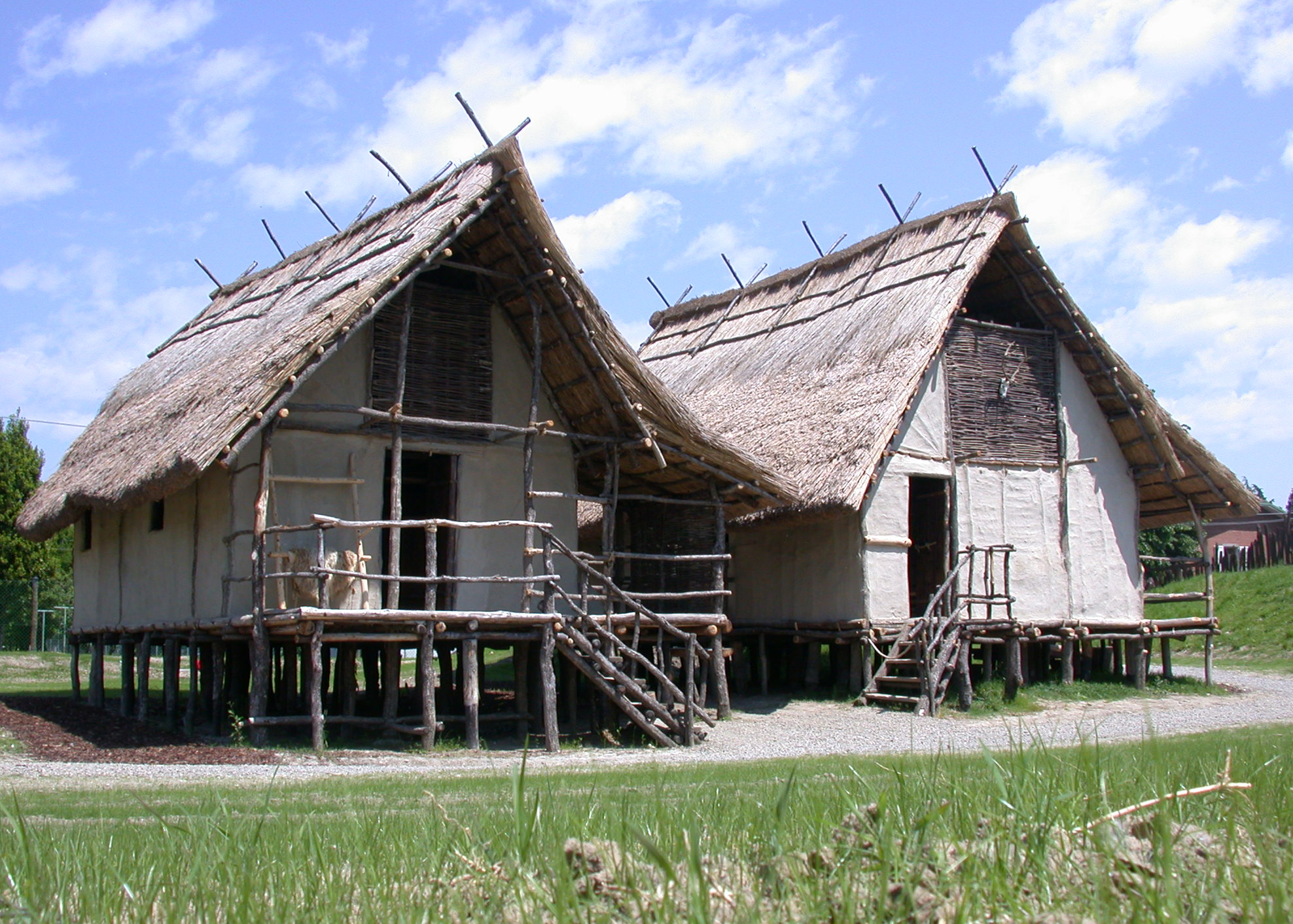
Reconstructed Terramare houses in Castelnuovo Rangone

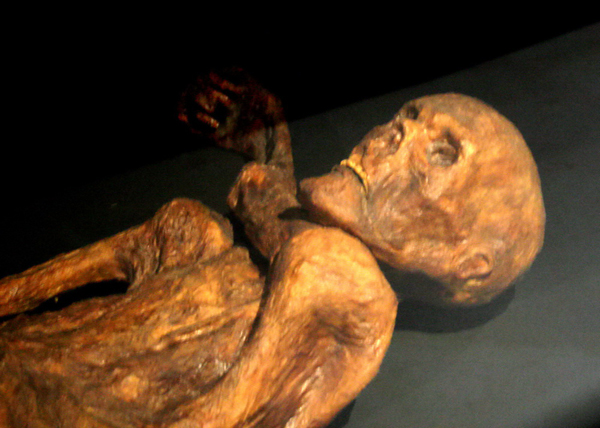
Ötzi, a natural mummy dating from the 4th millennium BC

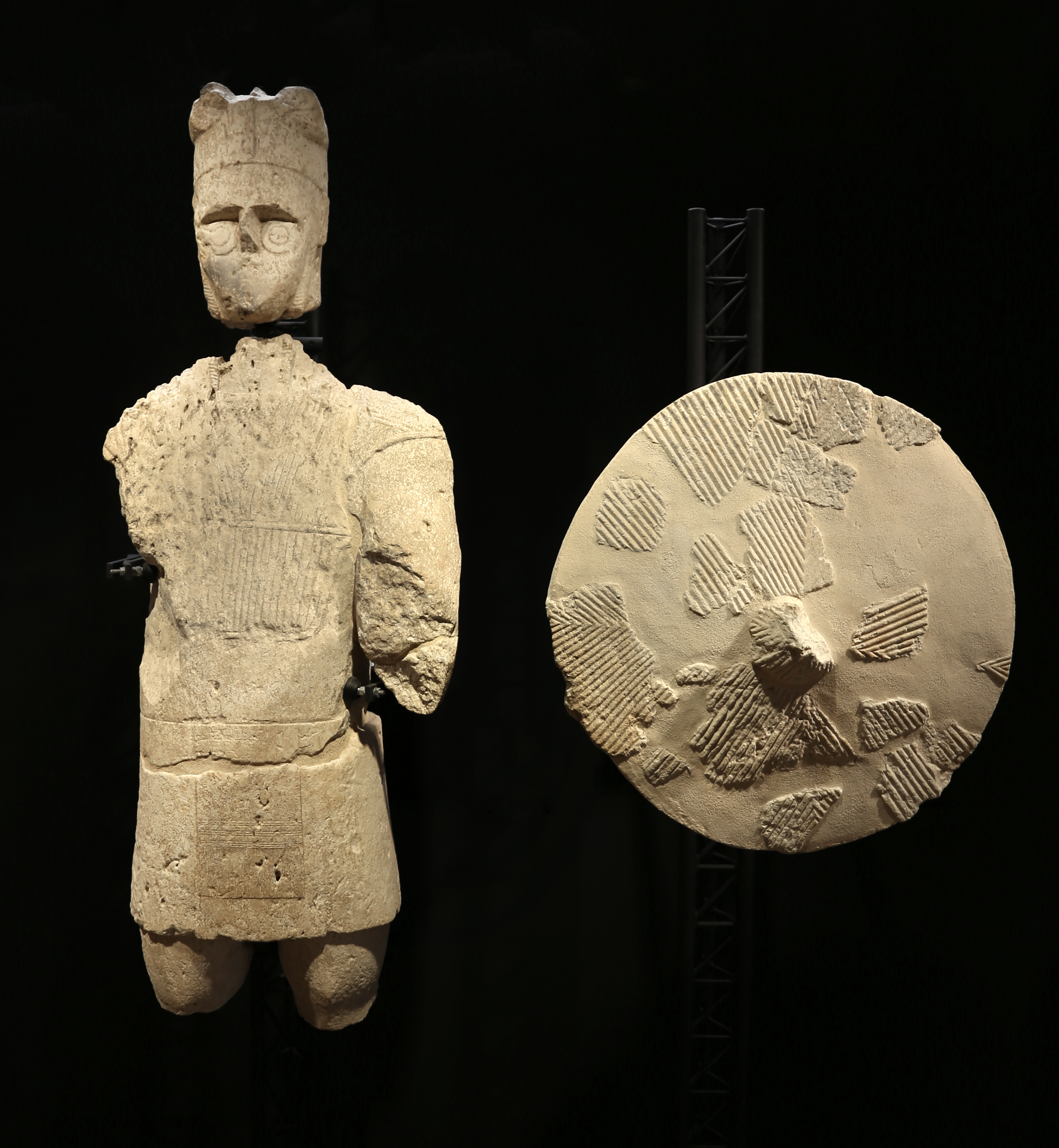
Giants of Mont'e Prama

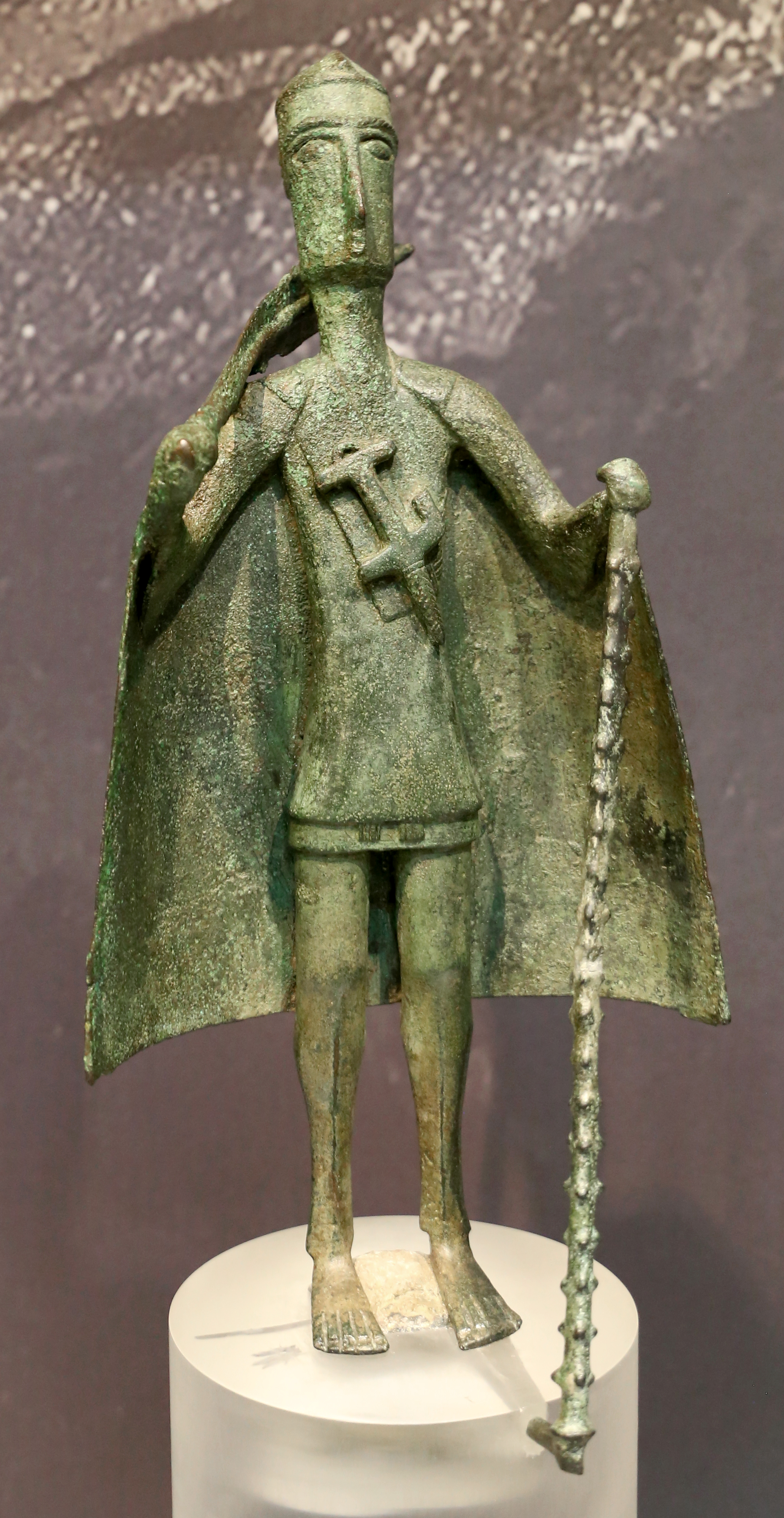
Bronze sculpture of a Nuragic chief from Uta

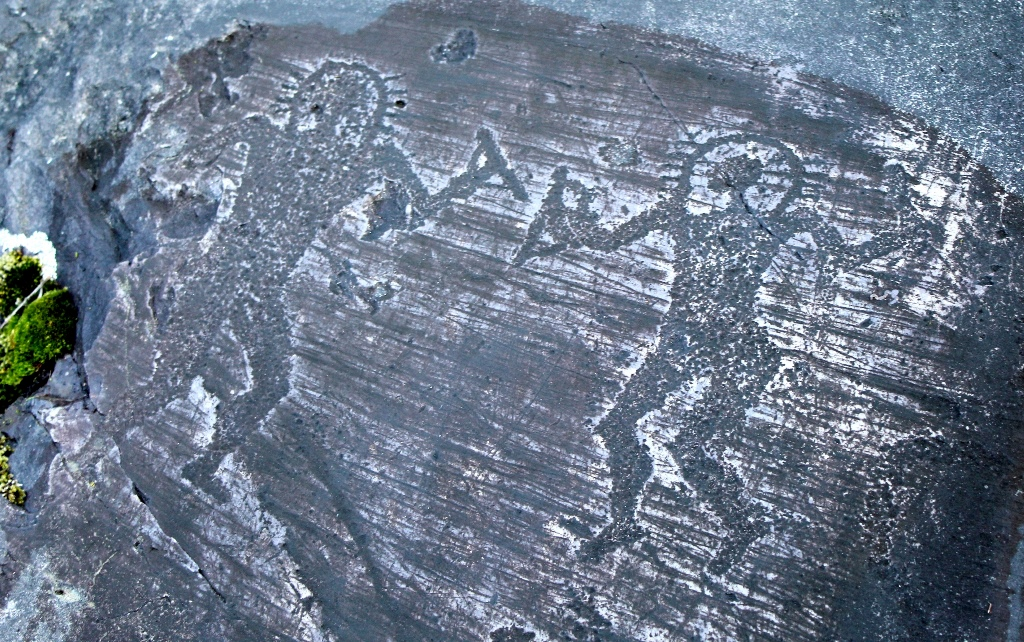
Petroglyph in Valcamonica, Lombardy, the largest collection of prehistoric petroglyphs in the world (10th millennium BC)

The arrival of the first hominins was 850,000 years ago at Monte Poggiolo. The presence of the Homo neanderthalensis has been demonstrated in archaeological findings near Rome and Verona dating to c. 50,000 years ago (late Pleistocene). Homo sapiens sapiens appeared during the upper Palaeolithic. Remains of the later prehistoric age include Ötzi the Iceman, dating to c. 3400–3100 BC (Copper Age).

During the Copper Age, Indoeuropean people migrated to Italy in four waves. A first Indoeuropean migration occurred around the mid-3rd millennium BC, from a population who imported coppersmithing. The Remedello culture took over the Po Valley. The second wave occurred in the Bronze Age, from the late 3rd to the early 2nd millennium BC, with tribes identified with the Beaker culture and by the use of bronze smithing, in the Padan Plain, in Tuscany and on the coasts of Sardinia and Sicily. In the mid-2nd millennium BC, a third wave arrived, associated with the Apenninian civilization and the Terramare culture. The Terramare people were hunters, but had domesticated animals and cultivated crops; they were fairly skilful metallurgists, casting bronze in moulds. In the late Bronze Age, from the late 2nd millennium to the early 1st millennium BC, a fourth wave, the Proto-Villanovan culture, brought iron-working to the Italian peninsula. Proto-Villanovan culture may have been part of the central European Urnfield culture system, or a derivation from Terramare culture. Various authors, such as Marija Gimbutas, associated this culture with the spread of the proto-Italics into the Italian Peninsula.

=== Nuragic civilization ===
Born in Sardinia and southern Corsica (where it is called Torrean civilization), the Nuraghe civilization lasted from the 18th century BC to the 2nd century AD. They take their name from the characteristic Nuragic towers, which evolved from the pre-existing megalithic culture, which built dolmens and menhirs. Today more than 7,000 nuraghes appear in Sardinia.

No written records of this civilization have been discovered, apart from a few possible short epigraphic documents. The only written information comes from classical literature of the Greeks and Romans, and may be considered more mythological than historical. The language (or languages) spoken in Sardinia during the Bronze Age is (are) unknown since there are no written records from the period, although research suggests that around the 8th century BC the Nuragic populations may have adopted an alphabet similar to that used in Euboea.

== Iron Age ==
=== Etruscan civilization ===
The Etruscan civilization flourished in central Italy after 800 BC. The main hypotheses on the origins of the Etruscans are that they are indigenous, probably stemming from the Villanovan culture, or that they are the result of invasion from the north or the Near East. A 2007 study has suggested a Near Eastern origin. The researchers conclude that their data, taken from the modern Tuscan population, "support the scenario of a post-Neolithic genetic input from the Near East to the present-day population of Tuscany". In the absence of any dating evidence, there is however no direct link between this genetic input and the Etruscans. By contrast, a mitochondrial DNA study of 2013 has suggested that the Etruscans were probably an indigenous population. Among ancient populations, ancient Etruscans are found to be closest to a Neolithic population from Central Europe.

It is widely accepted that Etruscans spoke a non-Indo-European language. Some inscriptions in a similar language, known as Lemnian, have been found on the Aegean island of Lemnos. Etruscans were a monogamous society that emphasized pairing. The historical Etruscans had achieved a form of state with remnants of chiefdom and tribal forms. The first attestations of an Etruscan religion can be traced to the Villanovan culture.

Etruscan expansion was focused across the Apennines. The political structure of the Etruscan culture was similar, albeit more aristocratic, to Magna Graecia in the south. The mining and commerce of metal, especially copper and iron, led to an enrichment of the Etruscans and to the expansion of their influence in the Italian peninsula and the western Mediterranean. Here their interests collided with those of the Greeks, especially in the 6th century BC, when Phoceans of Italy founded colonies along the coast of France, Catalonia and Corsica. This led the Etruscans to ally themselves with the Carthaginians.

Around 540 BC, the Battle of Alalia led to a new distribution of power in the western Mediterranean. Carthage expanded its sphere of influence at the expense of the Greeks, and Etruria saw itself relegated to Corsica. From the first half of the 5th century, the new international political situation meant the beginning of the Etruscan decline. In 480 BC, Etruria's ally Carthage was defeated by a coalition of Magna Graecia cities led by Syracuse.

A few years later, in 474 BC, Syracuse's tyrant Hiero defeated the Etruscans at the Battle of Cumae. Etruria's influence over the cities of Latium and Campania weakened, and it was taken over by Romans and Samnites. In the 4th century, Etruria saw a Gallic invasion end its influence over the Po valley and the Adriatic coast. Meanwhile, Rome had started annexing Etruscan cities. This led to the loss of their north provinces. Etruscia was assimilated by Rome around 500 BC.

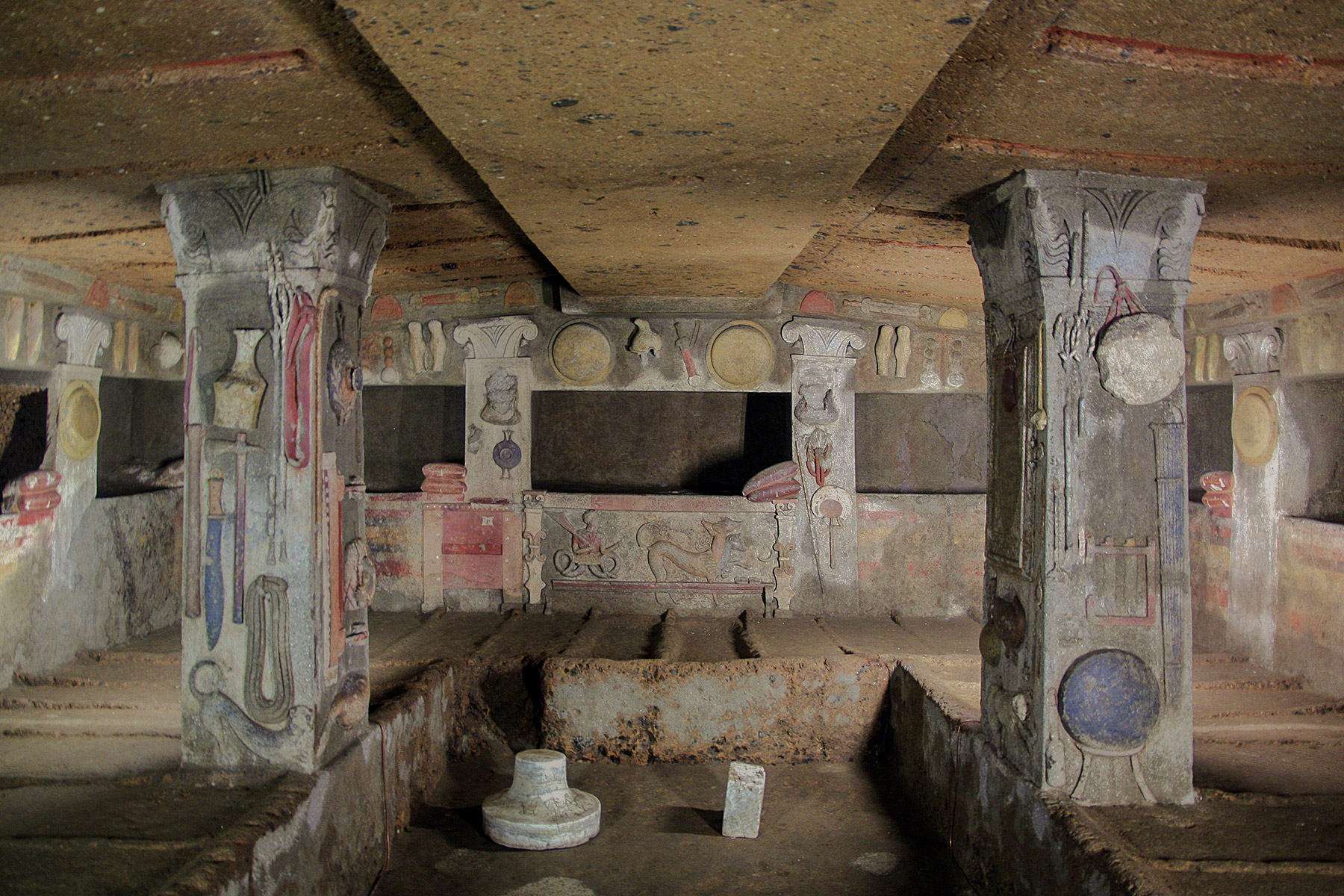
Necropolis of Banditaccia located in Cerveteri, Lazio

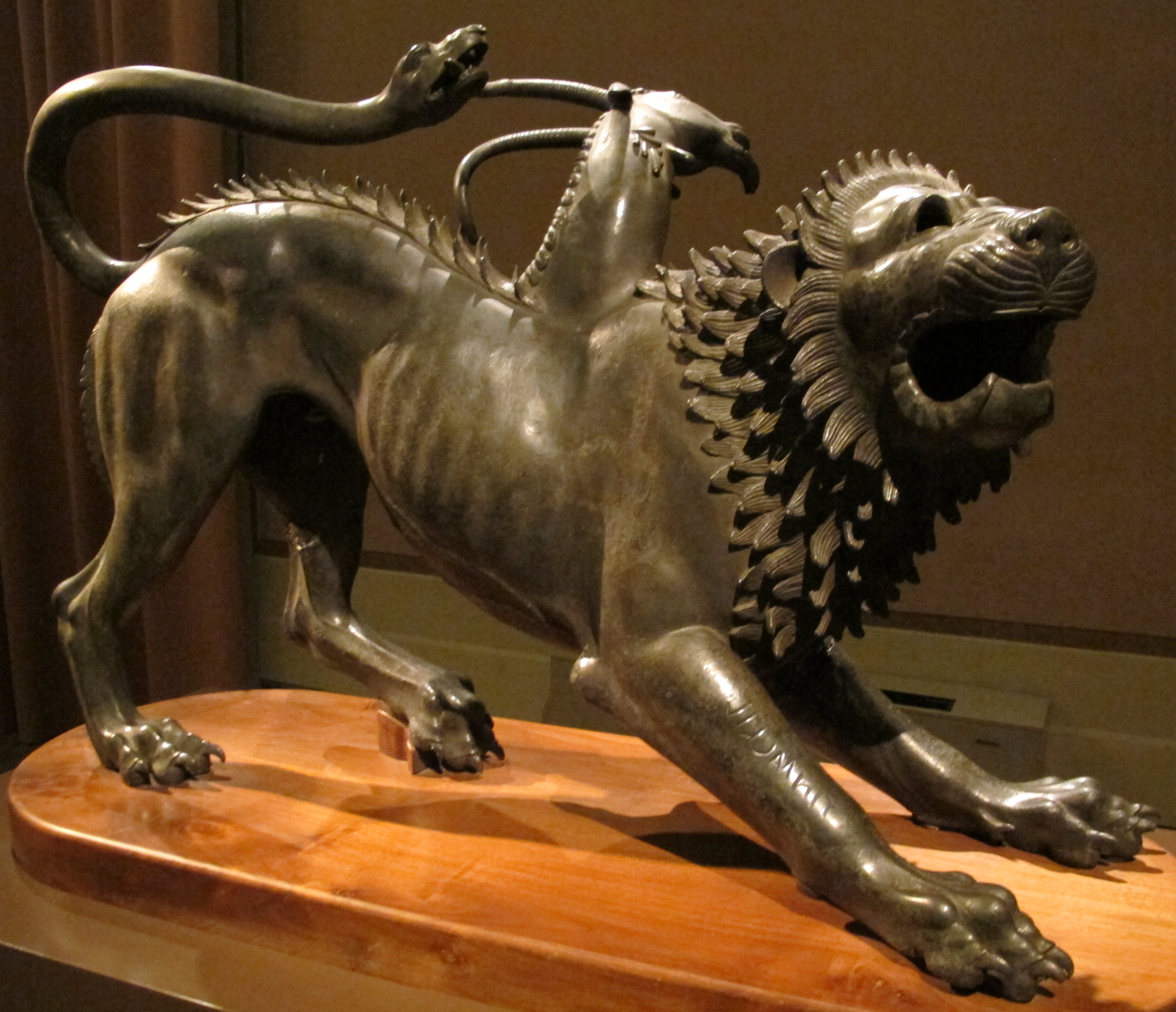
Chimera of Arezzo

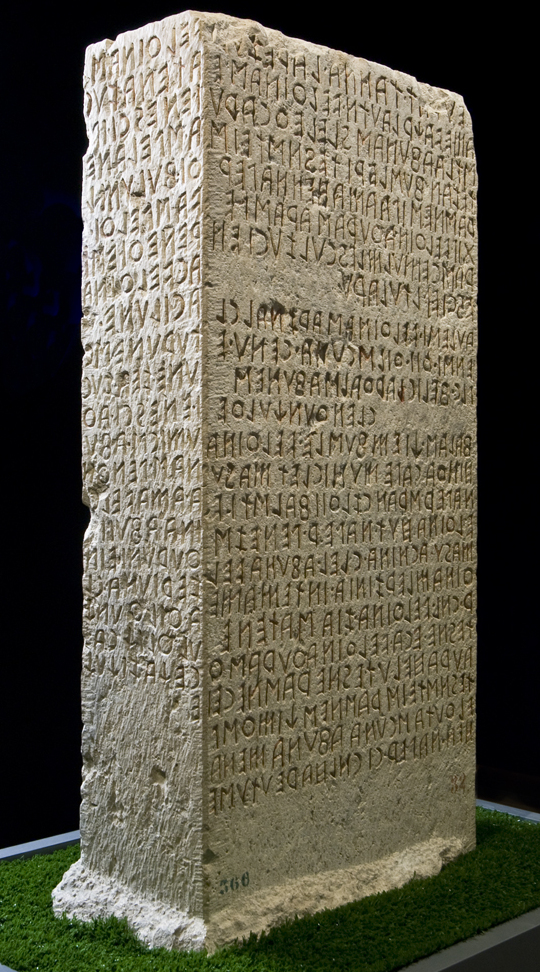
Cippus Perusinus

=== Italic peoples ===
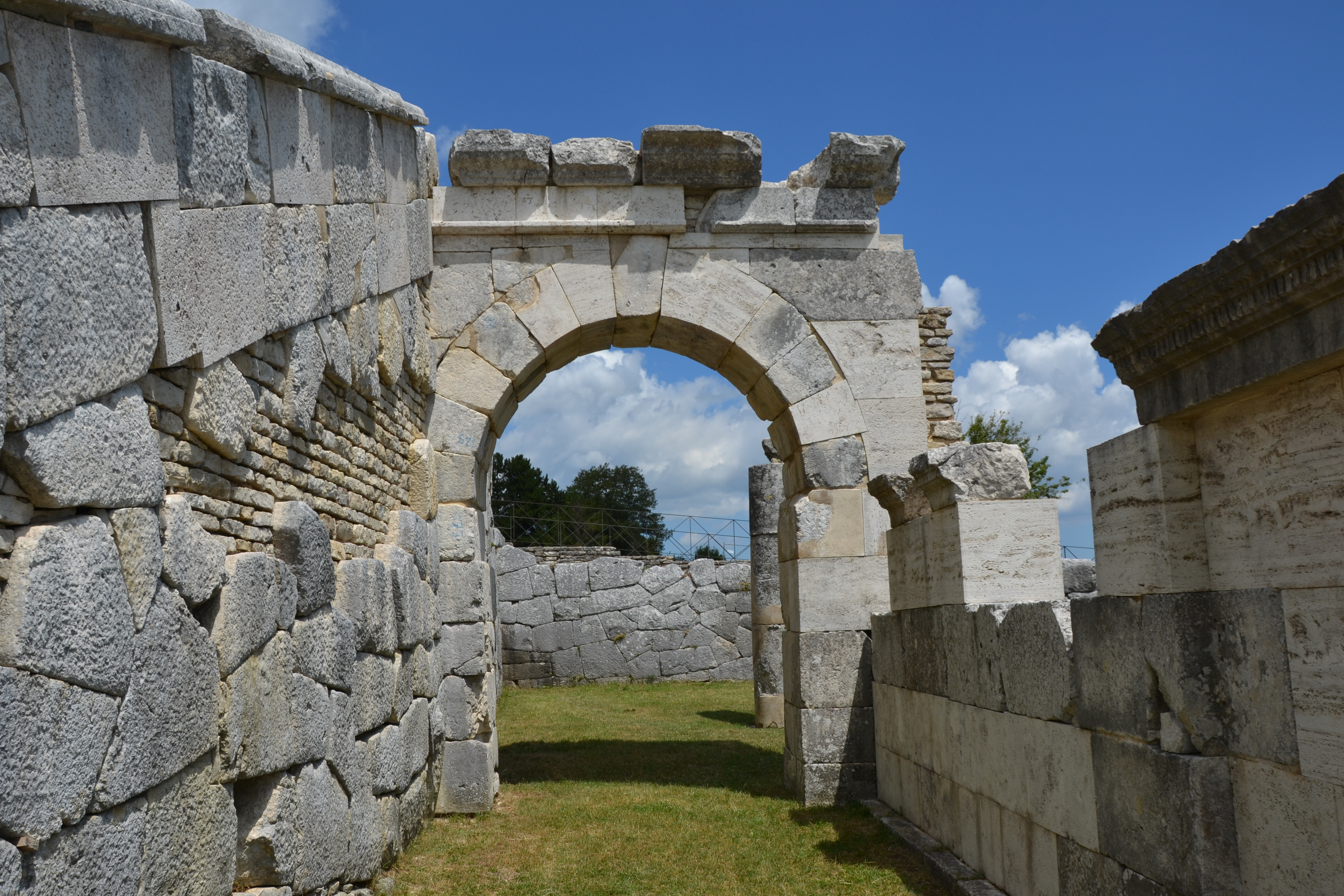
Samnite sanctuary complex at Pietrabbondante

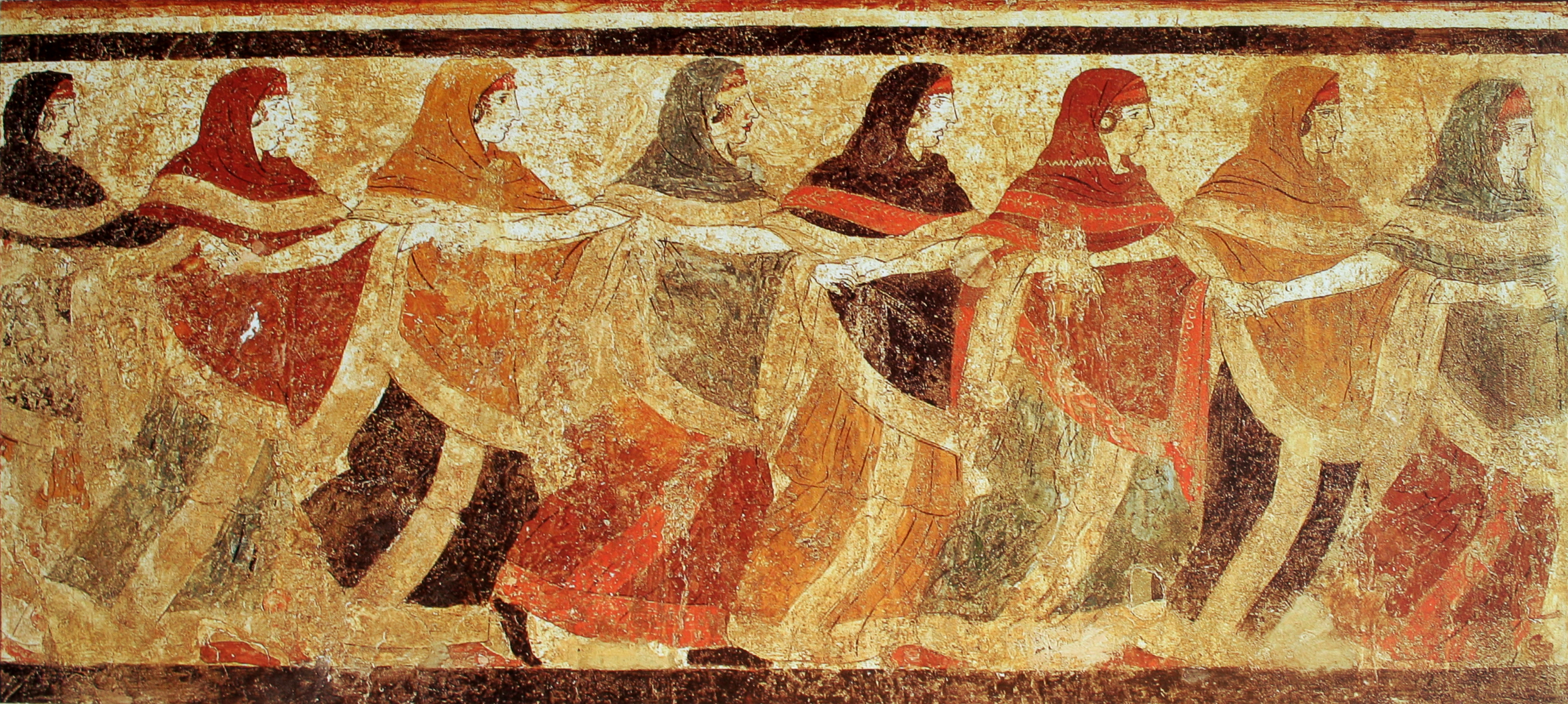
Fresco of dancing Peucetian women in the Tomb of the Dancers in Ruvo di Puglia, 4th–5th century BC

The Italic peoples were an ethnolinguistic group identified by use of Italic languages. Among the Italic peoples in the Italian peninsula were the Osci, the Veneti, the Samnites, the Latins and the Umbri.

In the region south of the Tiber (Latium Vetus), the Latial culture of the Latins emerged, while in the north-east of the peninsula the Este culture of the Veneti appeared. Roughly in the same period, from their core area in central Italy (modern-day Umbria and Sabina), the Osco-Umbrians began to emigrate in various waves, through the process of Ver sacrum, the ritualized extension of colonies, in southern Latium, Molise and the whole southern half of the peninsula, replacing the previous tribes, such as the Opici and the Oenotrians. This corresponds with the emergence of the Terni culture, which had strong similarities with the Celtic cultures of Hallstatt and La Tène.

Before and during the period of the arrival of the Greek and Phoenician immigrants, Sicily was already inhabited by native Italics in three major groups: the Elymians in the west, the Sicani in the centre, and the Sicels (source of the name Sicily) in the east.

It is generally believed that around 2000 BC, the Ligures occupied a large area of the peninsula, including much of north-western Italy and all of northern Tuscany. Since many scholars consider the language of this ancient population to be Pre-Indo-European, they are often not classified as Italics.

By the mid-first millennium BC, the Latins of Rome were growing in power and influence. After the Latins had liberated themselves from Etruscan rule they acquired a dominant position among the Italic tribes. Frequent conflict between various Italic tribes followed; the best documented are the Samnite Wars. The Latins eventually succeeded in unifying the Italic elements in the country. In the early first century BC, several Italic tribes, in particular the Marsi and the Samnites, rebelled against Roman rule (the Social War). After Roman victory was secured, all peoples in Italy, except for the Celts of the Po Valley, were granted Roman citizenship. In the subsequent centuries, Italic tribes adopted Latin language and culture in a process known as Romanization.

=== Magna Graecia ===
Ancient Greek colonies and their dialect groupings in Magna Graecia NW Greek Achaean Doric Ionian

In the eighth and seventh centuries BC, for reasons including demographic crisis, the search for new commercial outlets and ports, and expulsion from their homeland, Greeks began to settle along the coast of Sicily and the southern part of the Italian peninsula, which became known as Magna Graecia.

Greek culture was exported to Italy, in its dialects of the Ancient Greek language, its religious rites and its traditions of the independent polis. An original Hellenic civilization soon developed, later interacting with the native Italic and Latin civilisations. The most important cultural transplant was the Chalcidean/Cumaean variety of the Greek alphabet, which was adopted by the Etruscans; the Old Italic alphabet subsequently evolved into the Latin alphabet.

Many of the new Hellenic cities became very rich and powerful, like Neapolis (Naples), Syracuse, Acragas, and Sybaris. Other cities in Magna Graecia included Tarentum, Epizephyrian Locri, Rhegium, Croton, Thurii, Elea, Nola, Ancona, Syessa, Bari, and others.

After Pyrrhus of Epirus failed to stop the spread of Roman hegemony in 282 BC, the south fell under Roman domination. It was held by the Byzantine Empire after the fall of Rome in the West and even the Lombards failed to consolidate it, though the centre of the south was theirs from Zotto's conquest in the final quarter of the 6th century.

== Roman period ==
=== Roman Kingdom ===
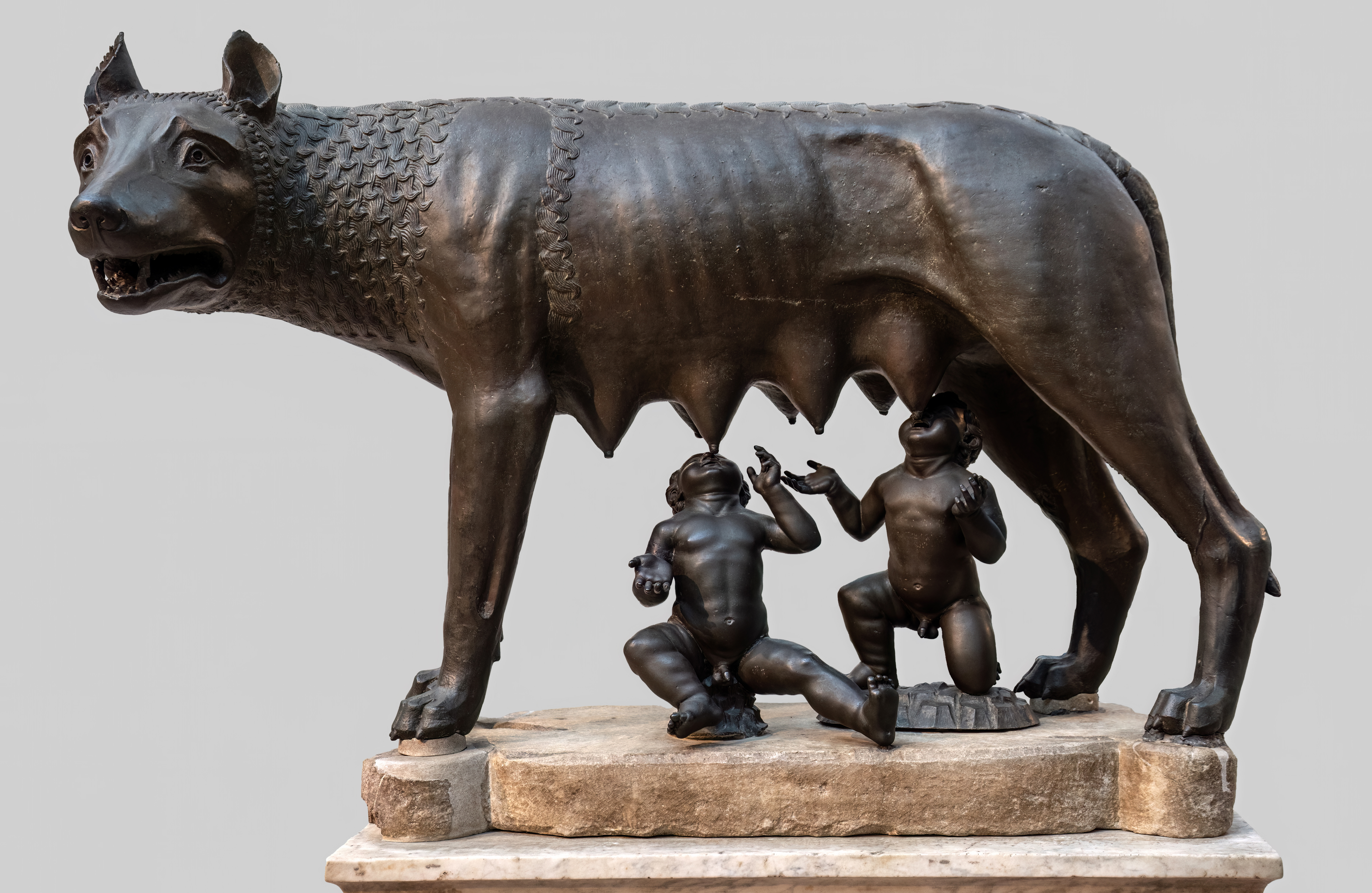
The Capitoline Wolf sculpture in the Capitoline Museums. According to legend, Rome was founded in 753 BC by Romulus and Remus, who were raised by a she-wolf.

Little is certain about the history of the Roman Kingdom, as nearly no written records from that time survive, and the histories written during the Republic and Empire are largely based on legends. According to the founding myth of Rome, the city was founded on 21 April 753 BC by twin brothers Romulus and Remus, who descended from the Trojan prince Aeneas and who were grandsons of Numitor of Alba Longa. Natale di Roma (Birthday of Rome) is an annual festival held in Rome on 21 April to celebrate the founding of the city.

The traditional account of Roman history, which has come down through Livy, Plutarch, Dionysius of Halicarnassus, and others, is that in Rome's first centuries, it was ruled by a succession of seven kings. The Gauls destroyed much of Rome's historical records when they sacked the city after the Battle of the Allia in 390 or 387 BC. With no contemporary records, all accounts of the kings must be carefully evaluated.

=== Roman Republic ===
Animation showing the growth and division of Ancient Rome, years AD

According to tradition and later writers such as Livy, the Roman Republic was established around 509 BC, when the last of the seven kings of Rome, Tarquin the Proud, was deposed by Lucius Junius Brutus. A system based on annually elected magistrates and various representative assemblies was established. A constitution set a series of checks and balances, and a separation of powers. The most important magistrates were the two consuls, who together exercised executive authority as imperium, or military command. The consuls had to work with the senate, which was initially an advisory council of the ranking nobility, or patricians, but grew in size and power.

In the 4th century BC, the Republic came under attack by the Gauls, who initially prevailed and sacked Rome. The Romans then drove the Gauls back, led by Camillus. The Romans gradually subdued the other peoples on the peninsula. The last threat to Roman hegemony in Italy came when Tarentum, a major Greek colony, enlisted the aid of Pyrrhus of Epirus in 281 BC, but this effort failed.

In the 3rd century BC, Rome had to face a new and formidable opponent: Carthage. In the three Punic Wars, Carthage was eventually destroyed and Rome gained control over Hispania, Sicily and North Africa. After defeating the Macedonian and Seleucid Empires in the 2nd century BC, the Romans became the dominant people of the Mediterranean. The conquest of the Hellenistic kingdoms provoked a fusion between Roman and Greek cultures and the Roman elite, once rural, became a luxurious and cosmopolitan one. By this time Rome was a consolidated empire – in the military view – and had no major enemies. Roman armies occupied Spain in the early 2nd century BC but encountered stiff resistance. The Celtiberian stronghold of Numantia became the centre of Spanish resistance in the 140s and 130s BC. Numantia fell and was razed to the ground in 133 BC. In 105 BC, the Celtiberians drove the Cimbri and Teutones from northern Spain, though these had crushed Roman arms in southern Gaul, inflicting 80,000 casualties on the Roman army. The conquest of Hispania was completed in 19 BC—but at a heavy cost.

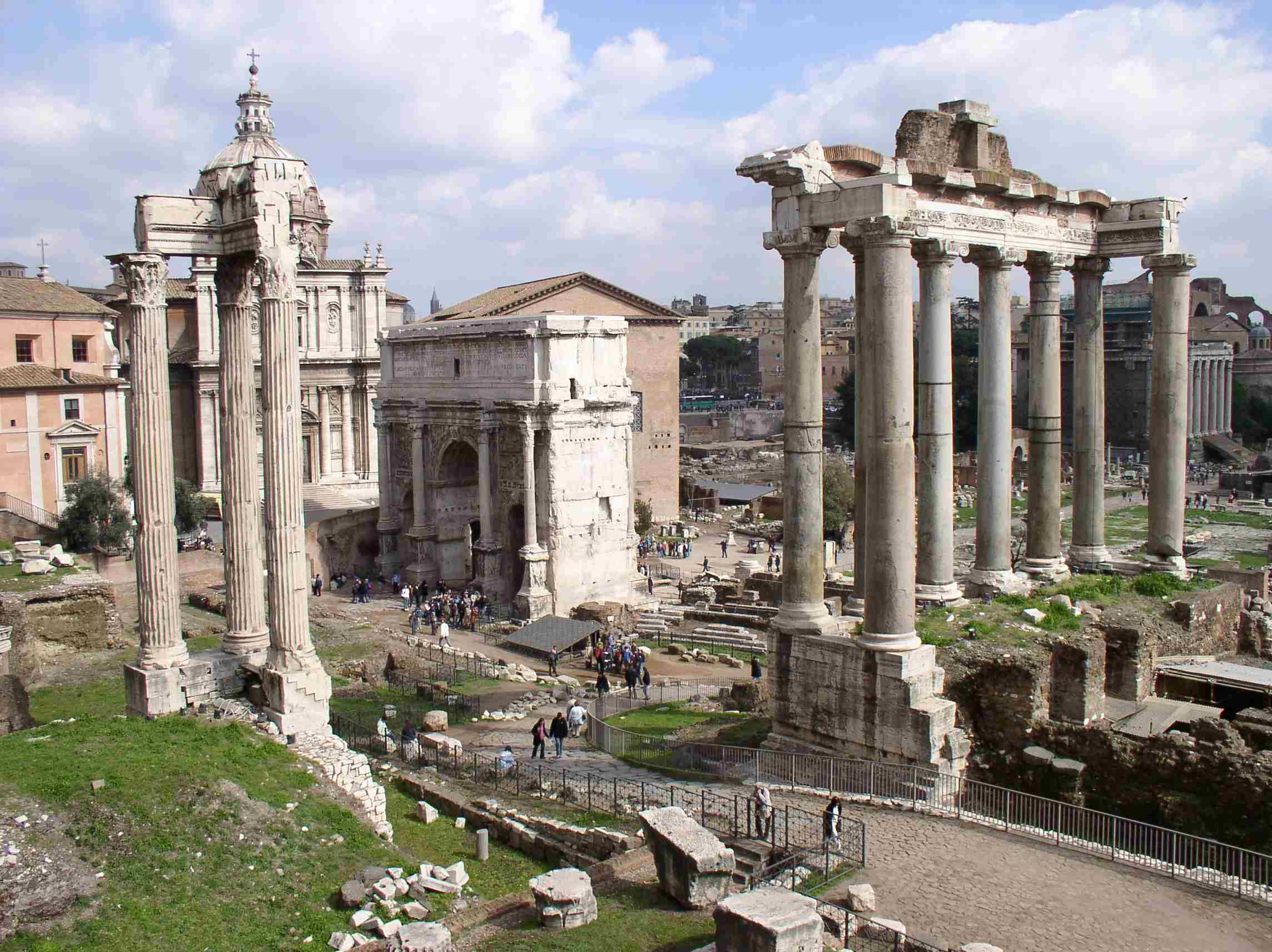
The Roman Forum, the commercial, cultural, and political centre of the city and the Republic, which housed the various offices and meeting places of the government

Towards the end of the 2nd century BC, a huge migration of Germanic tribes took place, led by the Cimbri and the Teutones. These tribes overwhelmed the peoples with whom they came into contact and threatened Italy. At the Battle of Aquae Sextiae and the Battle of Vercellae the Germans were virtually annihilated. In these two battles the Teutones and Ambrones are said to have lost 290,000 men, and the Cimbri 220,000.

In the mid-1st century BC, the Republic faced a period of political crisis and social unrest. Julius Caesar reconciled the two more powerful men in Rome: Marcus Licinius Crassus and Pompey. In 53 BC, the Triumvirate disintegrated at the death of Crassus. After being victorious in the Gallic Wars, Caesar crossed the Rubicon and invaded Rome in 49 BC, rapidly defeating Pompey. Caesar was eventually granted a dictatorship for perpetuity but was murdered in 44 BC. Caesar's assassination caused political and social turmoil; without the dictator's leadership, Rome was ruled by his friend and colleague, Mark Antony. Octavian (Caesar's adopted son), along with Antony and Marcus Aemilius Lepidus, established the Second Triumvirate. Lepidus was forced to retire in 36 BC after betraying Octavian in Sicily. Antony settled in Egypt with his lover, Cleopatra VII, which was seen as an act of treason.

Following Antony's Donations of Alexandria, which gave Cleopatra the title of "Queen of Kings", and to their children the regal titles to the newly conquered Eastern territories, war between Octavian and Mark Antony broke out. Octavian annihilated Egyptian forces in the Battle of Actium in 31 BC. Mark Antony and Cleopatra committed suicide. Rome thus possessed unchallenged naval supremacy in the North Sea, Atlantic coasts, Mediterranean, Red Sea, and the Black Sea.

=== Roman Empire ===
The Augustus of Prima Porta, 1st century AD, depicting Augustus, the first Roman emperor. He reorganized Italy into 11 regiones.

Octavian's leadership brought the zenith of the Roman civilization, which lasted for four decades. His adoption of the name Augustus in 27 BC is usually taken by historians as the beginning of the Roman Empire. Officially, the government was republican, but Augustus assumed absolute powers. The Senate granted Octavian a unique grade of Proconsular imperium, which gave him authority over all Proconsuls (military governors). The unruly imperial provinces at the borders, where the vast majority of the legions were stationed, were under the control of Augustus. The peaceful senatorial provinces were under the control of the Senate. The Roman legions, which had reached an unprecedented number (around 50) because of the civil wars, were reduced to 28.

Within Italy in times of peace, Roman magistrates exercised the Imperium domi (police power) as an alternative to the Imperium militiae (military power). Italy's inhabitants had Latin Rights as well as religious and financial privileges.

The Colosseum in Rome, built in the 1st century

Roman literature grew steadily in the Golden Age of Latin Literature, with poets like Vergil, Horace, Ovid and Rufus. Augustus also continued the shifts on the calendar promoted by Caesar, and the month of August is named after him. Augustus' enlightened rule resulted in 200 years of peace for the Empire, known as Pax Romana.

In the Principate, Italy was legally distinguished from the provinces, and along with some favored provincial communities, enjoyed immunity from the property tax and poll tax. However, under the Emperor Diocletian, Italy lost these privileges and was subdivided into provinces.

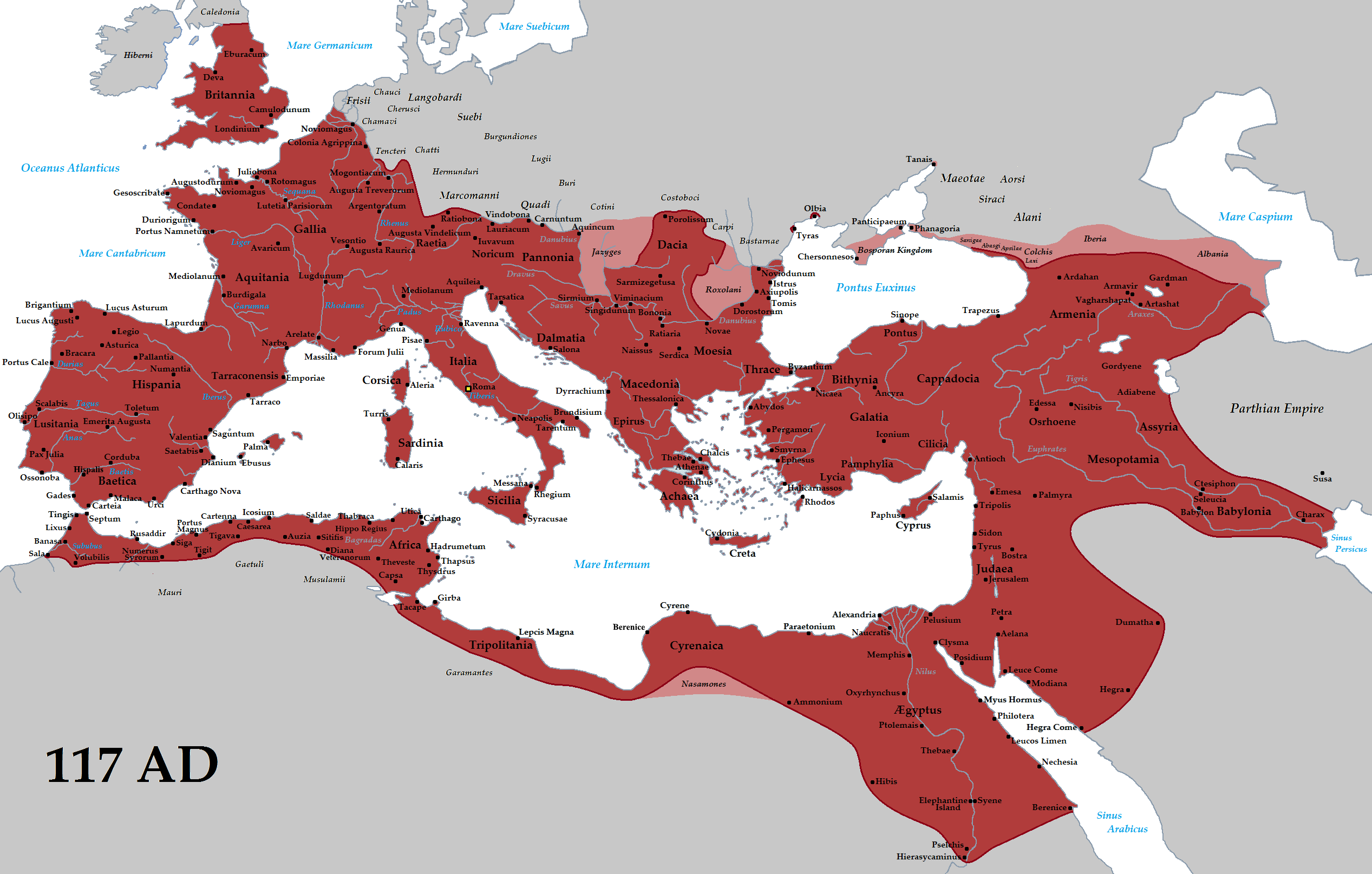
The Roman Empire at its greatest extent under Trajan in AD 117

Despite its military strength, the Empire made few efforts to expand, the most notable being the conquest of Britain, begun by emperor Claudius (47), and emperor Trajan's conquest of Dacia (101–102, 105–106). In the 1st and 2nd centuries, Roman legions were also employed in intermittent warfare with the Germanic tribes to the north and the Parthian Empire to the east. Meanwhile, armed insurrections (e.g. the Hebraic insurrection in Judea, 70) and brief civil wars (e.g. in 68 AD the year of the four emperors) demanded the legions' attention. The seventy years of Jewish–Roman wars in the second half of the 1st century and the first half of the 2nd century were exceptional in their duration and violence. An estimated 1,356,460 Jews were killed as a result of the First Jewish Revolt; the Second Jewish Revolt (115–117) led to the death of more than 200,000 Jews; and the Third Jewish Revolt (132–136) resulted in the death of 580,000 Jewish soldiers.

After the 395 death of Theodosius I, the Empire was divided into an Eastern and a Western Roman Empire. The Western part faced increasing economic and political crises and frequent barbarian invasions, so the capital was moved from Mediolanum to Ravenna. In 476, the last Western Emperor Romulus Augustulus was deposed by Odoacer.

== Middle Ages ==
Odoacer's rule ended when the Ostrogoths, under the leadership of Theodoric, conquered Italy. Decades later, the armies of Eastern Emperor Justinian entered Italy with the goal of re-establishing imperial Roman rule, which led to the Gothic War that devastated the whole country with famine and epidemics. Rome was besieged three times and entirely depopulated when sacked, and after Milan's capitulation to the Ostrogoths, its entire male population (estimated to 300,000 according to Procopius) was executed, and all the women were sold to Ostrogoth allies. This ultimately allowed another Germanic tribe, the Lombards, to take control over vast regions of Italy. In 751, the Lombards seized Ravenna, ending Byzantine rule in northern Italy. Facing a new Lombard offensive, the Papacy appealed to the Franks for aid.

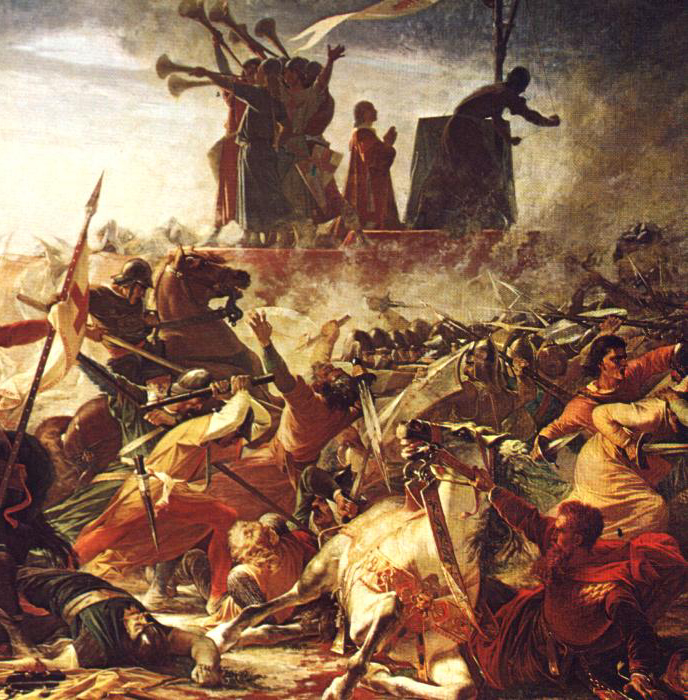
The defense of the Carroccio during the battle of Legnano by Amos Cassioli (1832–1891)

In 756 Frankish forces defeated the Lombards and gave the Papacy legal authority over much of central Italy, establishing the Papal States. In 800, Charlemagne was crowned emperor of what would become the Holy Roman Empire. After the death of Charlemagne (814), the new empire disintegrated under his weak successors, resulting in a power vacuum in Italy and coinciding with the rise of Islam in North Africa and the Middle East. In the South, there were attacks from the Umayyad Caliphate and the Abbasid Caliphate. In the North, there was a rising power of communes. In 852, the Saracens took Bari and founded an emirate there. Islamic rule over Sicily was effective from 902.

In the 11th century, trade slowly recovered as the cities started to grow again and the Papacy regained its authority. The Investiture controversy, over whether secular authorities had any legitimate role in appointments to ecclesiastical offices, was resolved by the Concordat of Worms in 1122, although problems continued in many areas of Europe until the end of the medieval era. In the north, a Lombard League of communes launched a successful effort to win autonomy from the Holy Roman Empire, defeating Emperor Frederick Barbarossa at the Battle of Legnano in 1176. In the south, the Normans occupied the Lombard and Byzantine possessions. The few independent city-states were also subdued. During the same period, the Normans ended Muslim rule in Sicily. In 1130, Roger II of Sicily began his rule as the first king of the Norman Kingdom of Sicily; he had succeeded in uniting all the Norman conquests in Southern Italy into one kingdom with a strong centralized government. In 1155, Emperor Manuel Komnenos attempted to regain Southern Italy, but the attempt failed and in 1158 the Byzantines left Italy. The Norman Kingdom lasted until 1194 when Sicily was claimed by the German Hohenstaufen Dynasty.

Between the 12th and 13th centuries, Italy developed a peculiar political pattern, significantly different from feudal Europe north of the Alps. The oligarchic city-state became the prevalent form of government. Keeping direct Church control and Imperial power at arm's length, the many independent city-states prospered through commerce, ultimately creating the conditions for the artistic and intellectual changes produced by the Renaissance. Northern cities and states were notable for their merchant republics, especially the Republic of Venice. Compared to feudal and absolute monarchies, the merchant republics enjoyed relative political freedom.

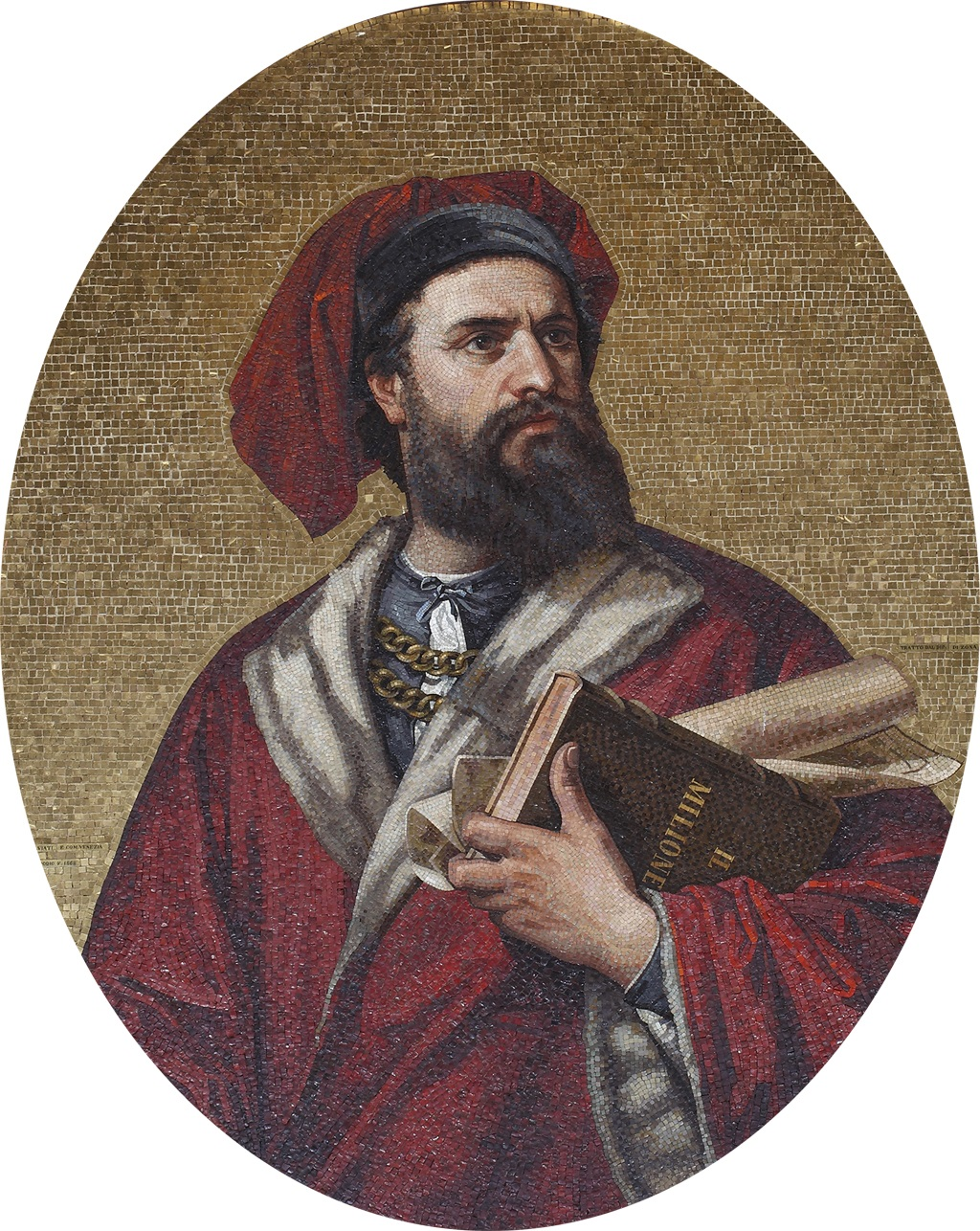
Marco Polo, explorer of the 13th century, recorded his 24 years-long travels in the Book of the Marvels of the World, introducing Europeans to Central Asia and China.

During this period, many Italian cities developed republican forms of government, such as the republics of Florence, Lucca, Genoa, Venice and Siena. During the 13th and 14th centuries these cities became major financial and commercial centres. Milan, Florence and Venice, among other city-states, played a crucial innovative role in financial development, devising the main instruments and practices of banking and new forms of social and economic organization.

During the same period, Italy saw the rise of the Maritime Republics: Venice, Genoa, Pisa, Amalfi, Ragusa, Ancona, Gaeta and Noli. From the 10th to the 13th centuries these cities built fleets of ships for their own protection and to support extensive trade networks across the Mediterranean, leading to an essential role in the Crusades. The maritime republics, especially Venice and Genoa, soon became Europe's main gateways to trade with the East, establishing colonies as far as the Black Sea and often controlling most of the trade with the Byzantine Empire and the Islamic Mediterranean world. The county of Savoy expanded its territory into the peninsula in the late Middle Ages, while Florence developed into a highly organized commercial and financial city-state, becoming for many centuries the European capital of silk, wool, banking and jewellery. Central and southern Italy was far poorer than the north. Rome was largely in ruins, and the Papal States were a loosely administered region with little law and order. Partly because of this, the Papacy had relocated to Avignon in France. Naples, Sicily, and Sardinia had for some time been under foreign domination. The Black Death in 1348 killed perhaps one-third of Italy's population.

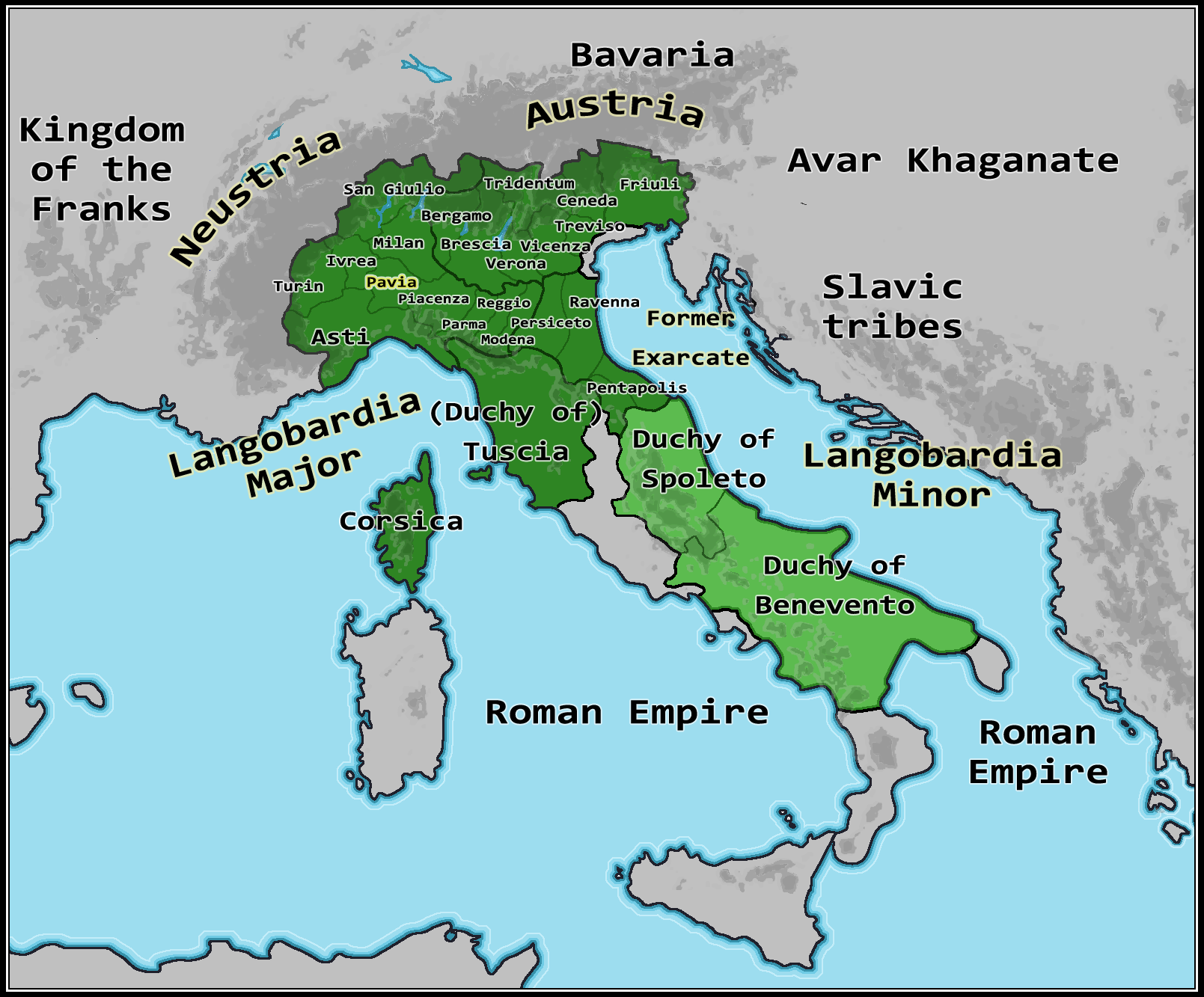
The Lombard Kingdom in 740, under King Liutprand

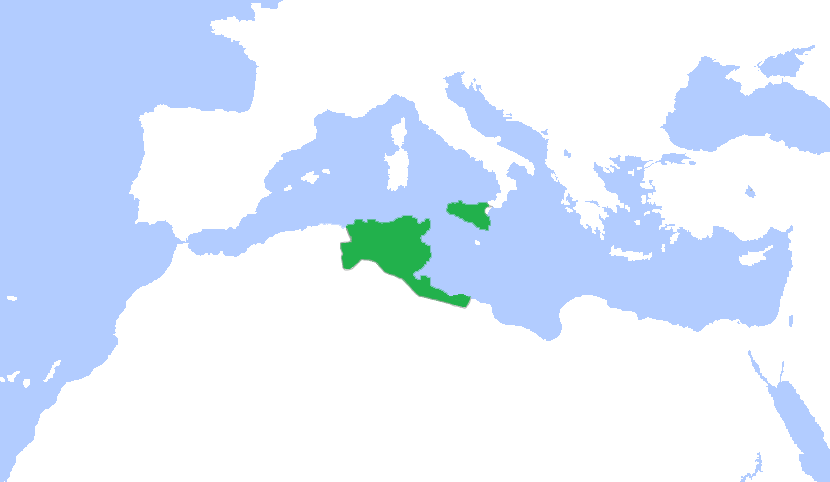
Emirate of Sicily (831–1072)

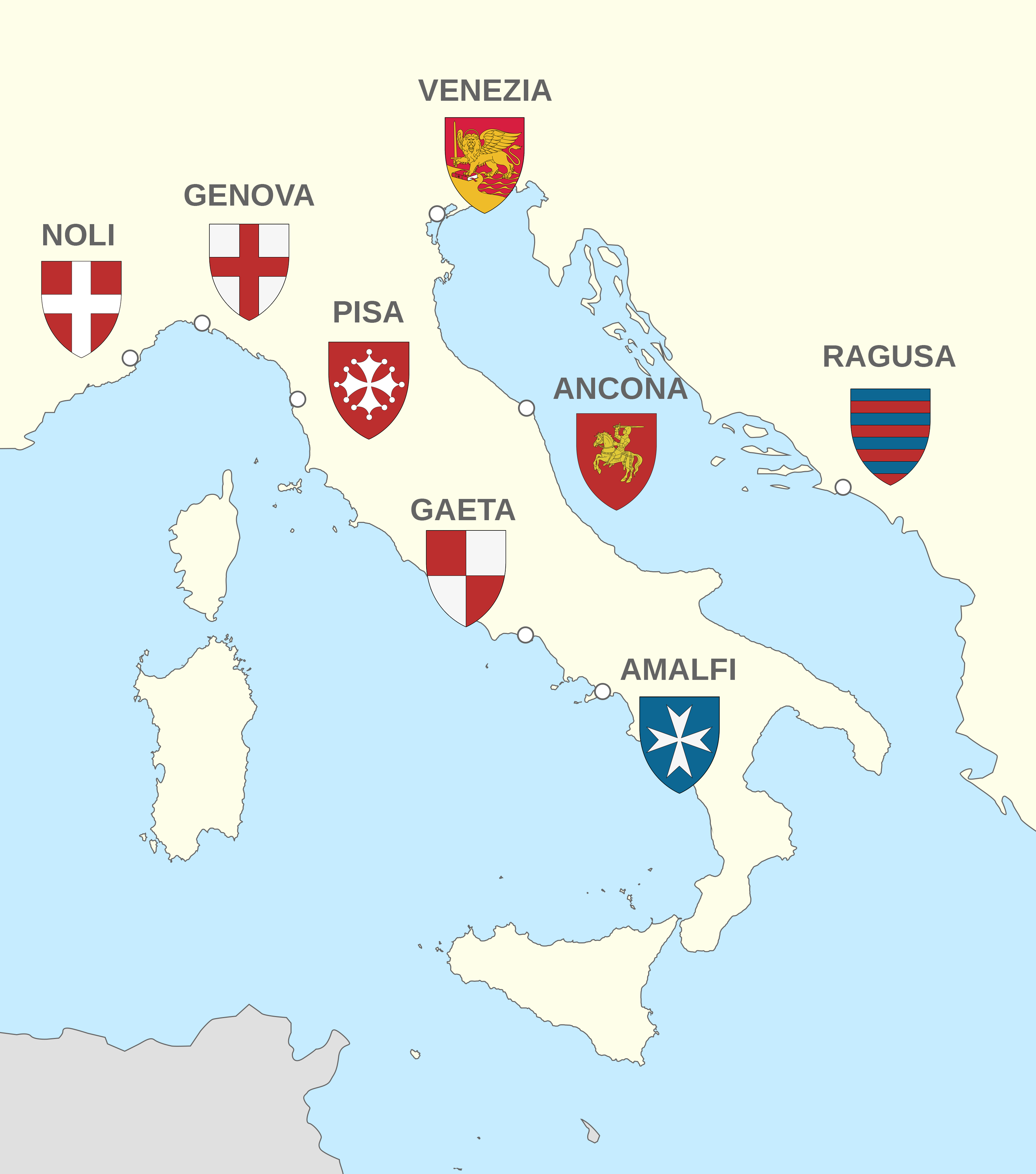
Location and coat of arms of the Maritime republics

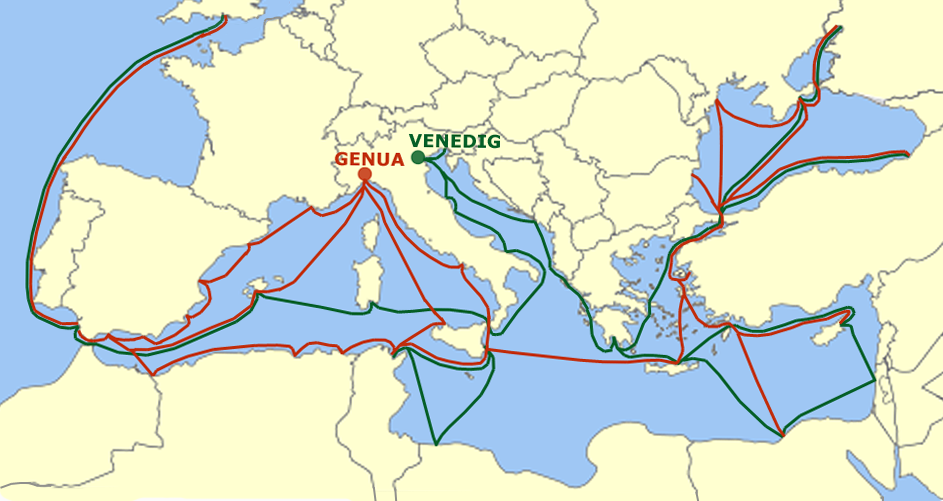
Trade routes and colonies of the Genoese (red) and Venetian (green) empires

== Renaissance ==
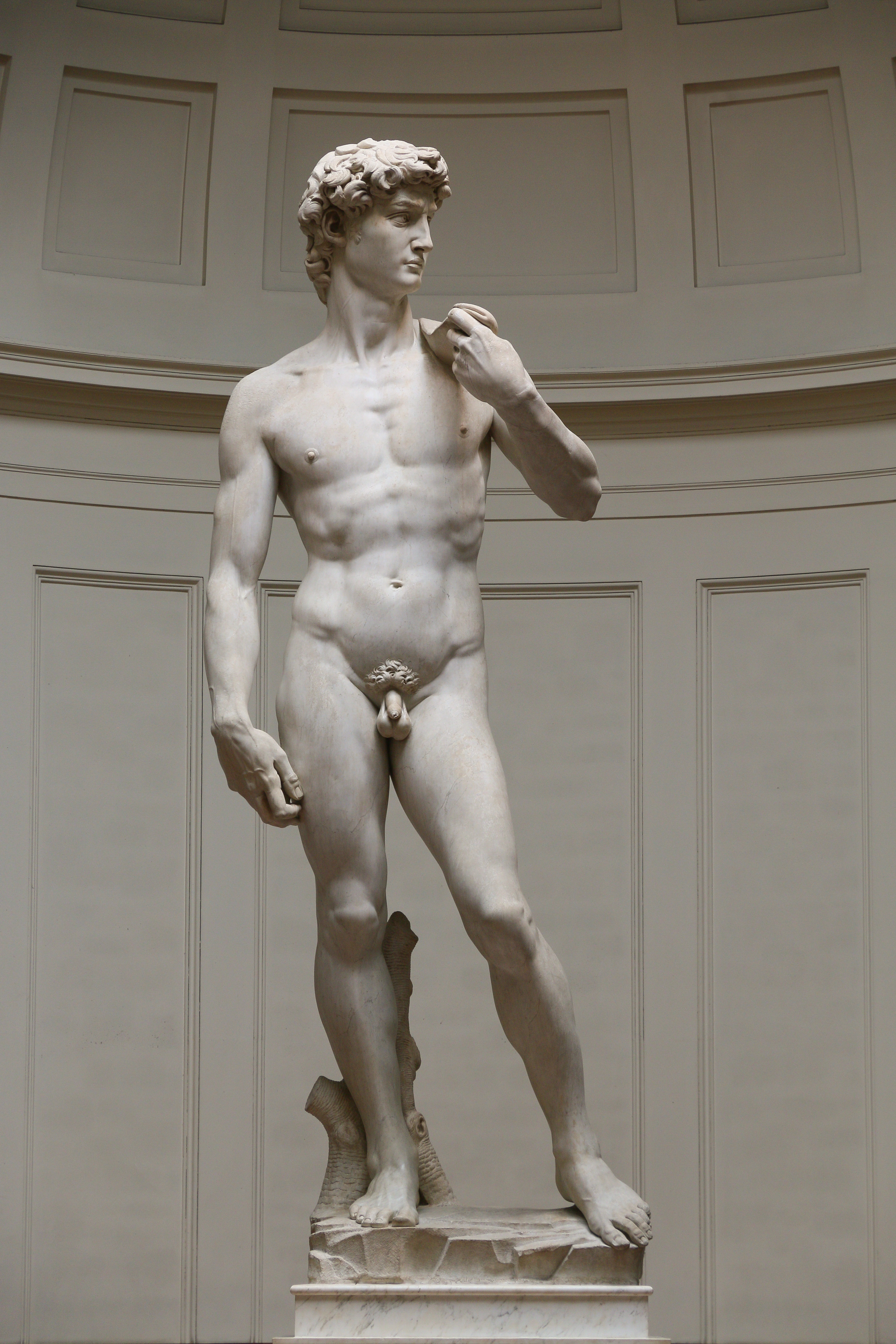
Michelangelo's David, one of the symbols of Italian Renaissance

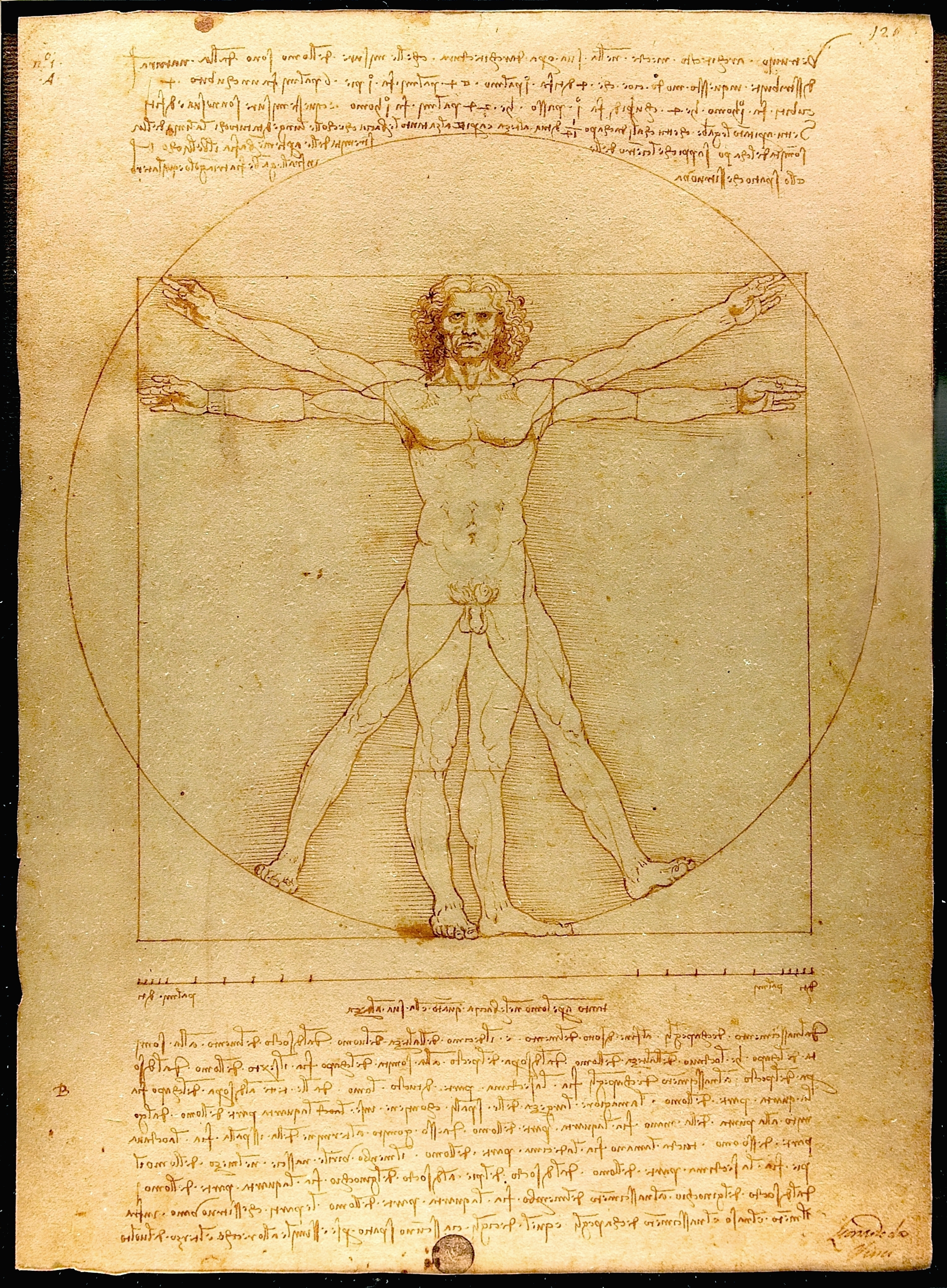
The Vitruvian Man by Leonardo da Vinci is a quintessential masterpiece of the Renaissance.

The recovery from the demographic and economic disaster of the late Middle Ages led to a resurgence of cities, trade and economy. Italy was the main centre of the Renaissance, whose flourishing of the arts, architecture, literature, science, historiography, and political theory influenced all of Europe. The Renaissance represented a "rebirth" not only of economy and urbanization but also of arts and science, fuelled by rediscoveries of ancient texts and the migration west into Italy of intellectuals fleeing the Eastern Roman Empire. The fall of Constantinople led to the migration of Greek scholars and texts to Italy, fueling the rediscovery of Greco-Roman Humanism. Humanist rulers such as Federico da Montefeltro and Pope Pius II worked to establish ideal cities, founding Urbino and Pienza respectively. Pico della Mirandola wrote the Oration on the Dignity of Man, considered the manifesto of Renaissance Humanism.

The Italian Renaissance began in Tuscany and spread south, having an especially significant impact on Rome, which was largely rebuilt by the Renaissance popes. The Tuscan variety of Italian came to predominate throughout the region, especially in Renaissance literature. Prominent authors of the era include Petrarch and Giovanni Boccaccio. Italian Renaissance painting and architecture exercised a dominant influence on subsequent European art. The Aldine Press, founded by the printer Aldo Manuzio, developed Italic type and the small, relatively portable and inexpensive printed book that could be carried in one's pocket. In the early 16th century, Baldassare Castiglione with The Book of the Courtier laid out his vision of the ideal gentleman and lady, while Niccolò Machiavelli in The Prince, laid down the foundation of modern philosophy, especially modern political philosophy. It was also in direct conflict with the dominant Catholic and scholastic doctrines of the time.

The Italian Renaissance was remarkable in economic development. Venice and Genoa were trade pioneers, first as maritime republics and then as regional states, followed by Milan, Florence, and the rest of northern Italy. Reasons for their early development include the relative military safety of Venetian lagoons, the high population density and the institutional structure which inspired entrepreneurs. Venice was the first real international financial center, which slowly emerged from the 9th century to its peak in the 14th century. Tradeable bonds were invented during this period.

=== Age of Discovery ===
Italian (Note: Though the modern state of Italy had yet to be established, the Latin equivalent of the term Italian had been in use for natives of the region since antiquity. See Pliny the Elder, Letters 9.23.) explorers and navigators from the dominant maritime republics, eager to find an alternative route to the Indies to bypass the Ottoman Empire, played a key role in the Age of Discovery and European colonization of the Americas. The most notable among them were Christopher Columbus, who is credited with discovering the New World; John Cabot, the first European to set foot in "New Found Land" and explore parts of the North American continent in 1497; Amerigo Vespucci, who first demonstrated in about 1501 that the New World was not Asia as initially conjectured but a different continent (America is named after him); and Giovanni da Verrazzano, the first European to explore the Atlantic coast of North America between Florida and New Brunswick in 1524. Marco da Nizza explored the region that later became Arizona and New Mexico in 1539. Henri de Tonti explored the Great Lakes region and co-founded New Orleans. Italian missionaries, including Alessandro Geraldini, François-Joseph Bressani, and Eusebio Kino, played a role in establishing Catholic missions in California. Kino explored and mapped the southwest and California. In the beginning of the 15th century, adventurers and traders such as Niccolò Da Conti travelled as far as Southeast Asia.

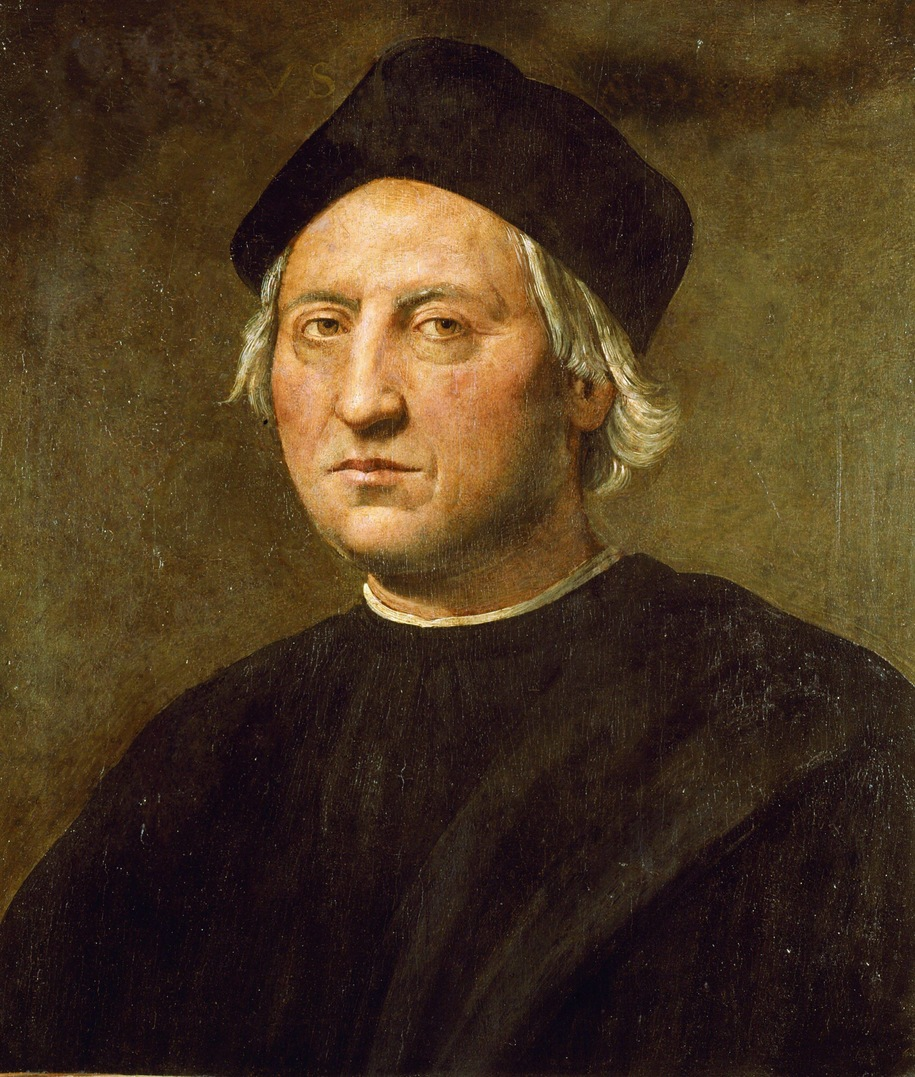
Christopher Columbus, who is credited with discovering the New World

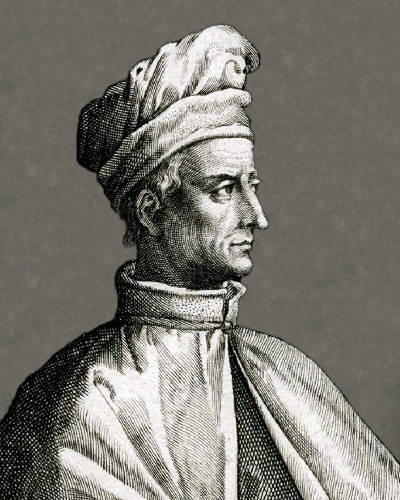
Amerigo Vespucci, who first demonstrated in about 1501 that the New World was not Asia as initially conjectured but a different continent (America is named after him)

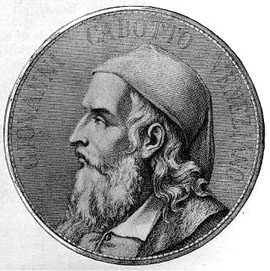
John Cabot, the first European to set foot in "New Found Land" and explore parts of the North American continent in 1497

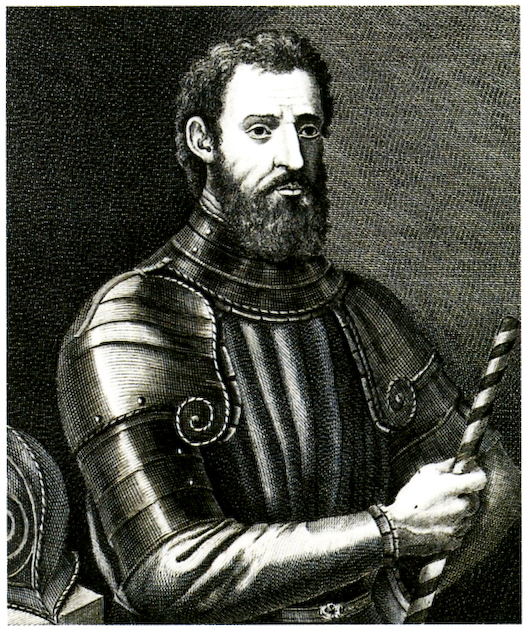
Giovanni da Verrazzano, the first European to explore the Atlantic coast of North America between Florida and New Brunswick in 1524

=== Warfare ===
In the 14th century, Northern Italy was divided into warring city-states, the most powerful being Milan, Florence, Pisa, Siena, Genoa, Ferrara, Mantua, Verona and Venice. High Medieval Northern Italy was further divided by the long-running battle for supremacy between the Papacy and the Holy Roman Empire. Warfare between the states was common, and invasion from outside Italy was confined to intermittent sorties of Holy Roman Emperors. Since the 13th century, as armies became primarily composed of mercenaries, prosperous city-states could field considerable forces despite their low populations. Over the 15th century, the most powerful city-states annexed their smaller neighbours: Florence took Pisa in 1406, Venice captured Padua and Verona, while the Duchy of Milan annexed nearby areas including Pavia and Parma.

The early Renaissance saw almost constant warfare on land and sea as the city-states vied for preeminence. On land, these wars were primarily fought by armies of mercenaries known as condottieri, bands of soldiers drawn from around Europe (especially Germany and Switzerland) led largely by Italian captains. Decades of fighting saw Florence, Milan and Venice emerge as the dominant players. These three powers agreed to the Peace of Lodi in 1454, which saw relative calm brought to the region for the next forty years. At sea, the main contenders were Pisa, Genoa, and Venice, but after a long conflict, the Genoese succeeded in reducing Pisa. Venice proved to be a more powerful adversary, and with the decline of Genoese power during the 15th century Venice became pre-eminent on the seas.

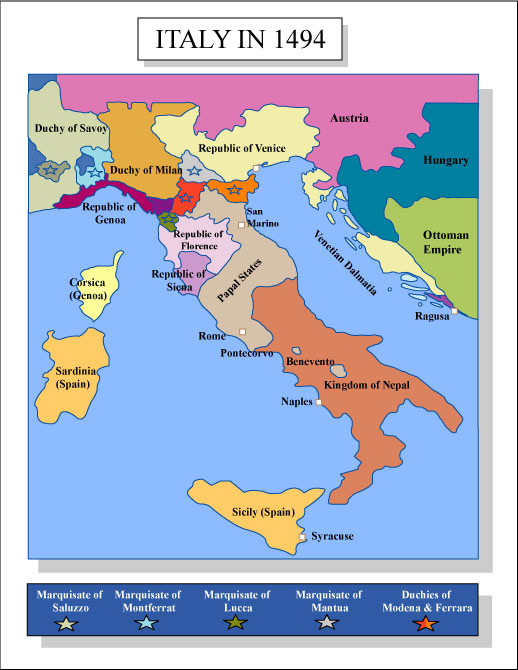
Italy in 1494

Foreign invasions of Italy (the Italian Wars) began with the 1494 invasion by France that wreaked widespread devastation on Northern Italy and ended the independence of many of the city-states. Originally arising from dynastic disputes over the Duchy of Milan and the Kingdom of Naples, the wars rapidly became a general struggle for power and territory. The French were routed by Holy Roman Emperor Charles V at the Battle of Pavia (1525) and again in the War of the League of Cognac (1526–30). After years of inconclusive fighting and involvement by multiple countries, with the Peace of Cateau-Cambrésis (1559), France renounced its claims in Italy, while the south of Italy remained under Spanish rule.

Much of Venice's hinterland (but not the city itself) was devastated by the Turks in 1499 and plundered by the League of Cambrai in 1509. Worst of all was the 6 May 1527 Sack of Rome by mutinous German mercenaries that all but ended the role of the Papacy as the largest patron of Renaissance art. The long Siege of Florence (1529–1530) brought the destruction of its suburbs, the ruin of its export business and the confiscation of its citizens' wealth. Italy's urban population halved; ransoms paid to the invaders and emergency taxes drained the finances. The wool and silk industries of Lombardy collapsed when their looms were wrecked by invaders. The defensive tactic of scorched earth only slightly delayed the invaders, and made the recovery much longer.

== From the Counter-Reformation to Napoleon ==
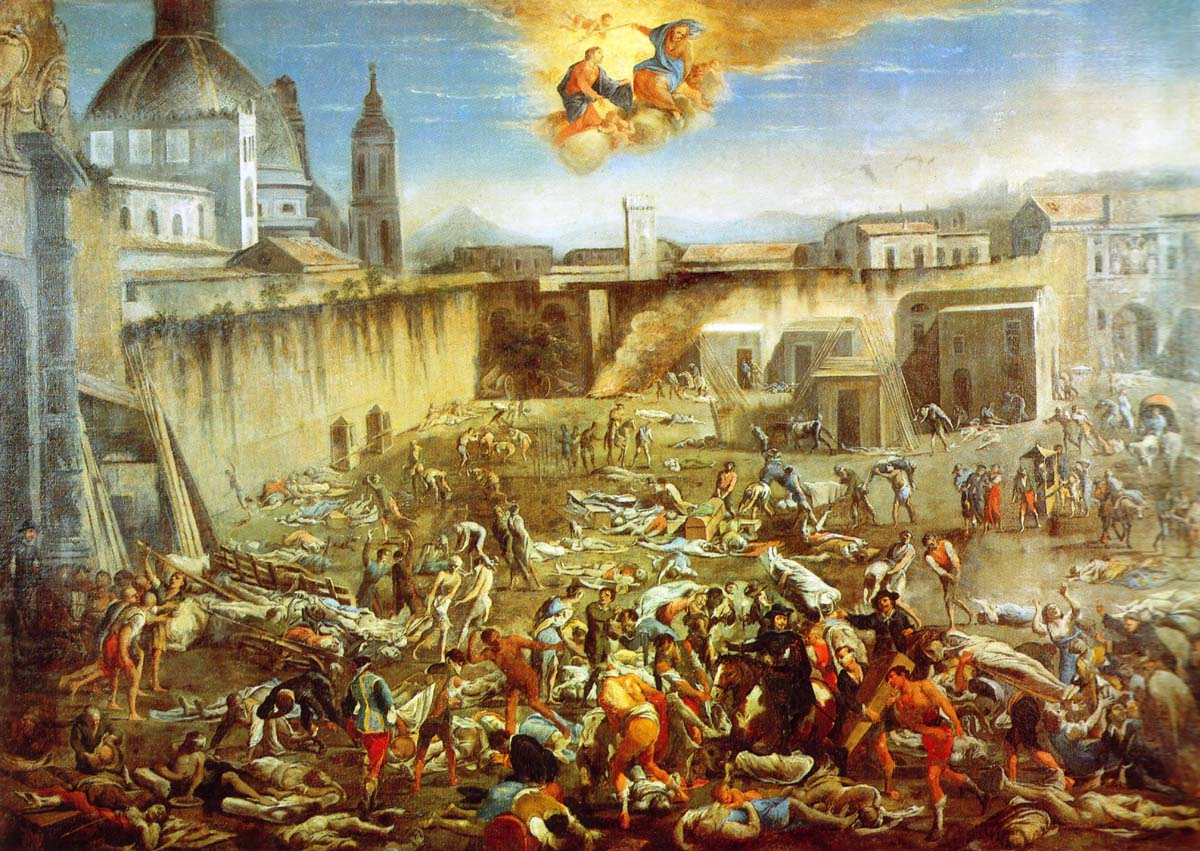
Naples during the Naples Plague in 1656

The 17th century was a tumultuous period in Italian history, marked by deep political and social changes. These included the increase of Papal power in the peninsula and the influence of the Catholic Church at the peak of the Counter Reformation, the Catholic reaction against the Protestant Reformation. From the Peace of Cateau-Cambrésis to the War of the Spanish Succession, the Spanish Habsburgs ruled Sicily, Naples, and Milan; these territories passed to the Austrian Habsburgs in 1700.

Despite important artistic and scientific achievements, such as the discoveries of Galileo and the flourishing of Baroque style, after 1600 Italy experienced an economic catastrophe. In 1600 Northern and Central Italy comprised one of the most advanced industrial areas of Europe, with an exceptionally high standard of living. By 1870 Italy was an economically backward and depressed area; its industrial structure had almost collapsed, its population was too high for its resources, its economy had become primarily agricultural. Wars, political fractionalization, limited fiscal capacity and the shift of world trade to north-western Europe and the Americas were key factors. The growing importance of the Atlantic trade undermined the importance of Venice as a commercial hub. Spain's involvement in the Thirty Years' War (1618–48), financed in part by taxes on its Italian possessions, heavily drained the commerce and agriculture of the south; as Spain declined, it dragged its Italian domains down with it, spreading conflicts and revolts (such as the Neapolitan 1647 tax-related "Revolt of Masaniello"). The plague of 1630 that ravaged northern Italy, notably Milan and Venice, claimed possibly one million lives, or about 25% of the population. The plague of 1656 killed up to 43% of the population of the Kingdom of Naples. Historians believe the dramatic reduction in population (and, thus, in economic activity) contributed to Italy's downfall as a major commercial and political centre. By one estimate, while in 1500 the GDP of Italy was 106% of the French GDP, by 1700 it was only 75% of it.

=== 18th century ===
The War of the Spanish Succession (1701–1714) was triggered by the death without issue of the last Habsburg king of Spain, Charles II, who fixed the Spanish inheritance on Philip, Duke of Anjou, the grandson of King Louis XIV of France. In face of the threat of a French hegemony over much of Europe, a Grand Alliance between Austria, England, the Dutch Republic and other minor powers (including the Duchy of Savoy) was signed in The Hague. The Alliance successfully fought and defeated the Franco-Spanish "Party of the Two Crowns", and the subsequent Treaty of Utrecht and Rastatt passed control of much of Italy (Milan, Naples and Sardinia) from Spain to Austria, while Sicily was ceded to the Duchy of Savoy. Spain attempted to retake territories in Italy and to claim the French throne in the War of the Quadruple Alliance (1718–1720), but was again defeated. As a result of the Treaty of The Hague, Spain agreed to abandon its Italian claims, while Duke Victor Amadeus II of Savoy agreed to exchange Sicily with Austria for the island of Sardinia, after which he was known as the King of Sardinia. The Spaniards regained Naples and Sicily following the Battle of Bitonto in 1738. Corsica passed from the Republic of Genoa to France in 1769 after the Treaty of Versailles. Italian was the official language of Corsica until 1859.

=== Age of Napoleon ===
Italy before the Napoleonic invasion (1796)

At the end of the 18th century, Italy was almost in the same political conditions as in the 16th century; the main differences were that Austria had replaced Spain as the dominant foreign power (though the War of the Polish Succession resulted in the re-installment of the Spanish in the south, as the House of Bourbon-Two Sicilies), and that the dukes of Savoy had become kings of Sardinia. In 1796 the French Army of Italy under Napoleon invaded Italy, with the aims of forcing the First Coalition to abandon Sardinia and forcing Austria to withdraw from Italy. Within only two weeks Victor Amadeus III of Sardinia was forced to sign an armistice. Napoleon then entered Milan, where he was welcomed as a liberator. Subsequently, beating off Austrian counterattacks and continuing to advance, he arrived in the Veneto in 1797. Here occurred the Veronese Easters, an act of rebellion against French oppression, that tied down Napoleon for about a week.

Napoleon conquered most of Italy in 1797–99. He set up a series of new republics, complete with new codes of law and abolition of old feudal privileges. Napoleon's Cisalpine Republic was centered on Milan. Genoa the city became a republic while its hinterland became the Ligurian Republic. The Roman Republic was formed out of the papal holdings while the pope himself was sent to France. The Neapolitan Republic was formed around Naples, but it lasted only five months before the Coalition recaptured it. In 1805, he formed the Kingdom of Italy, with himself as king and his stepson as viceroy. All these new countries were satellites of France, and had to pay large subsidies to Paris, as well as provide military support for Napoleon's wars. Their political and administrative systems were modernized, the metric system introduced, and trade barriers reduced. Jewish ghettos were abolished. Belgium and Piedmont became integral parts of France.

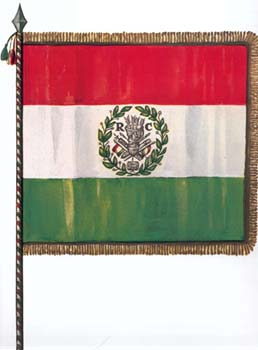
Flag of the Cispadane Republic, which was the first Italian tricolour adopted by a sovereign Italian state (1797)

During the Napoleonic era, in 1797, the first official adoption of the Italian tricolour as a national flag by a sovereign Italian state, the Cispadane Republic, a sister republic of Revolutionary France, took place. This event is celebrated by the Tricolour Day. The Italian national colours appeared for the first time on a tricolour cockade in 1789, anticipating by seven years the first green, white and red Italian military war flag, which was adopted by the Lombard Legion in 1796.

In 1805, after the French victory over the Third Coalition and the Peace of Pressburg, Napoleon recovered Veneto and Dalmatia, annexing them to the Italian Republic and renaming it the Kingdom of Italy. Also that year a second satellite state, the Ligurian Republic (successor to the old Republic of Genoa), was pressured into merging with France. In 1806, he conquered the Kingdom of Naples and granted it to his brother and then (from 1808) to Joachim Murat, along with marrying his sisters Elisa and Paolina off to the princes of Massa-Carrara and Guastalla. In 1808, he annexed Marche and Tuscany to the Kingdom of Italy. In 1809, Bonaparte occupied Rome, exiling the Pope first to Savona and then to France.

After Russia, the other states of Europe re-allied themselves and defeated Napoleon at the Battle of Leipzig, after which his Italian allied states abandoned him to ally with Austria. As Napoleon's reign began to fail, other national monarchs he had installed tried to keep their thrones by feeding nationalistic sentiments. Among these was the viceroy of Italy, Eugène de Beauharnais, who tried to get Austrian approval for his succession to the Kingdom of Italy, and Joachim Murat, who called for Italian patriots' help for the unification of Italy under his rule. Napoleon was defeated on 6 April 1814. The resulting Congress of Vienna (1814) restored a situation close to that of 1795, dividing Italy between Austria (in the north-east and Lombardy), the Kingdom of Sardinia, the Kingdom of the Two Sicilies (in the south and in Sicily), and Tuscany, the Papal States and other minor states in the centre. However, old republics such as Venice and Genoa were not recreated, Venice went to Austria, and Genoa went to the Kingdom of Sardinia.

On Napoleon's return to France (the Hundred Days), he regained Murat's support, but Murat proved unable to convince the Italians to fight for Napoleon with his Proclamation of Rimini and was beaten and killed. The Italian kingdoms thus fell, and Italy's Restoration period began, with many pre-Napoleonic sovereigns returned to their thrones. Piedmont, Genoa and Nice came to be united, as did Sardinia (which went on to create the State of Savoy), while Lombardy, Veneto, Istria and Dalmatia were re-annexed to Austria. The dukedoms of Parma and Modena re-formed, and the Papal States and the Kingdom of Naples returned to the Bourbons. The political and social events in the restoration period of Italy (1815–1835) led to popular uprisings throughout the peninsula and greatly shaped what would become the Italian Wars of Independence. All this led to a new Kingdom of Italy and Italian unification. Frederick Artz emphasizes the benefits the Italians gained:

For nearly two decades the Italians had the excellent codes of law, a fair system of taxation, a better economic situation, and more religious and intellectual toleration than they had known for centuries. ... Everywhere old physical, economic, and intellectual barriers had been thrown down and the Italians had begun to be aware of a common nationality.

French historian Hippolyte Taine stated:

Napoleon, far more Italian than French, Italian by race, by instinct, imagination, and souvenir, considers in his plan the future of Italy, and, on casting up the final accounts of his reign, we find that the net loss is for France and the net profit is for Italy.

== Unification (1814–1861) ==
Animated map of the Italian unification from 1829 to 1871

The Risorgimento was the political and social process that unified different states of the Italian Peninsula. It is difficult to pin down exact dates for the beginning and end of Italian reunification, but most scholars agree that it began with the end of Napoleonic rule and the Congress of Vienna in 1815, and approximately ended with the Franco-Prussian War in 1871, though the last "città irredente" did not join until the Italian victory in World War I.

In 1820, Spaniards successfully revolted over disputes about their Constitution, which influenced the development of a similar movement in Italy. A regiment in the army of the Kingdom of Two Sicilies, commanded by Guglielmo Pepe, a Carbonaro (member of the secret republican organization), mutinied, conquering the peninsular part of Two Sicilies. The king, Ferdinand I, agreed to enact a new constitution. The revolutionaries, though, failed to court popular support and fell to Austrian troops of the Holy Alliance. Ferdinand abolished the constitution and began systematically persecuting revolutionaries, many of whom were forced into exile.

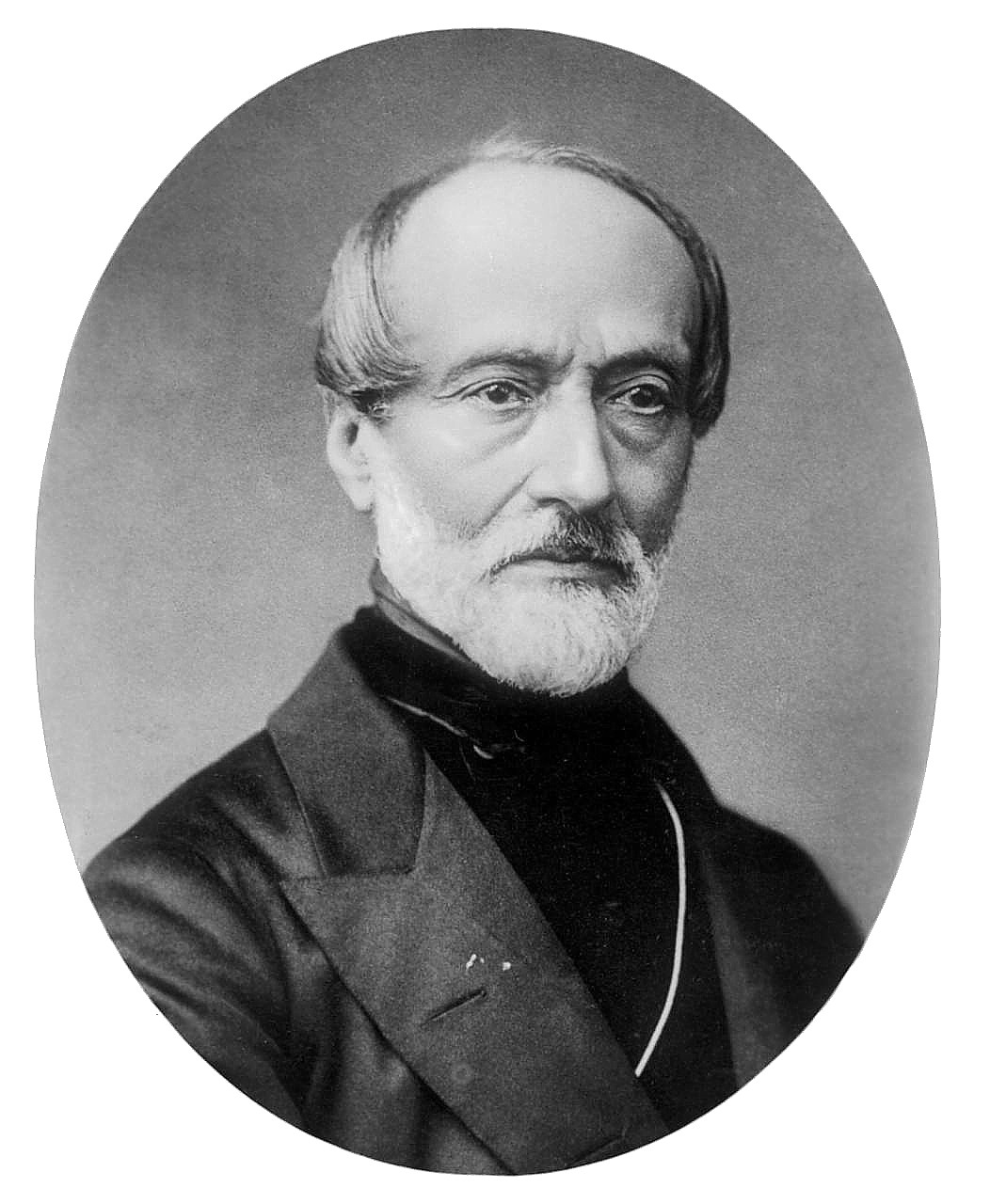
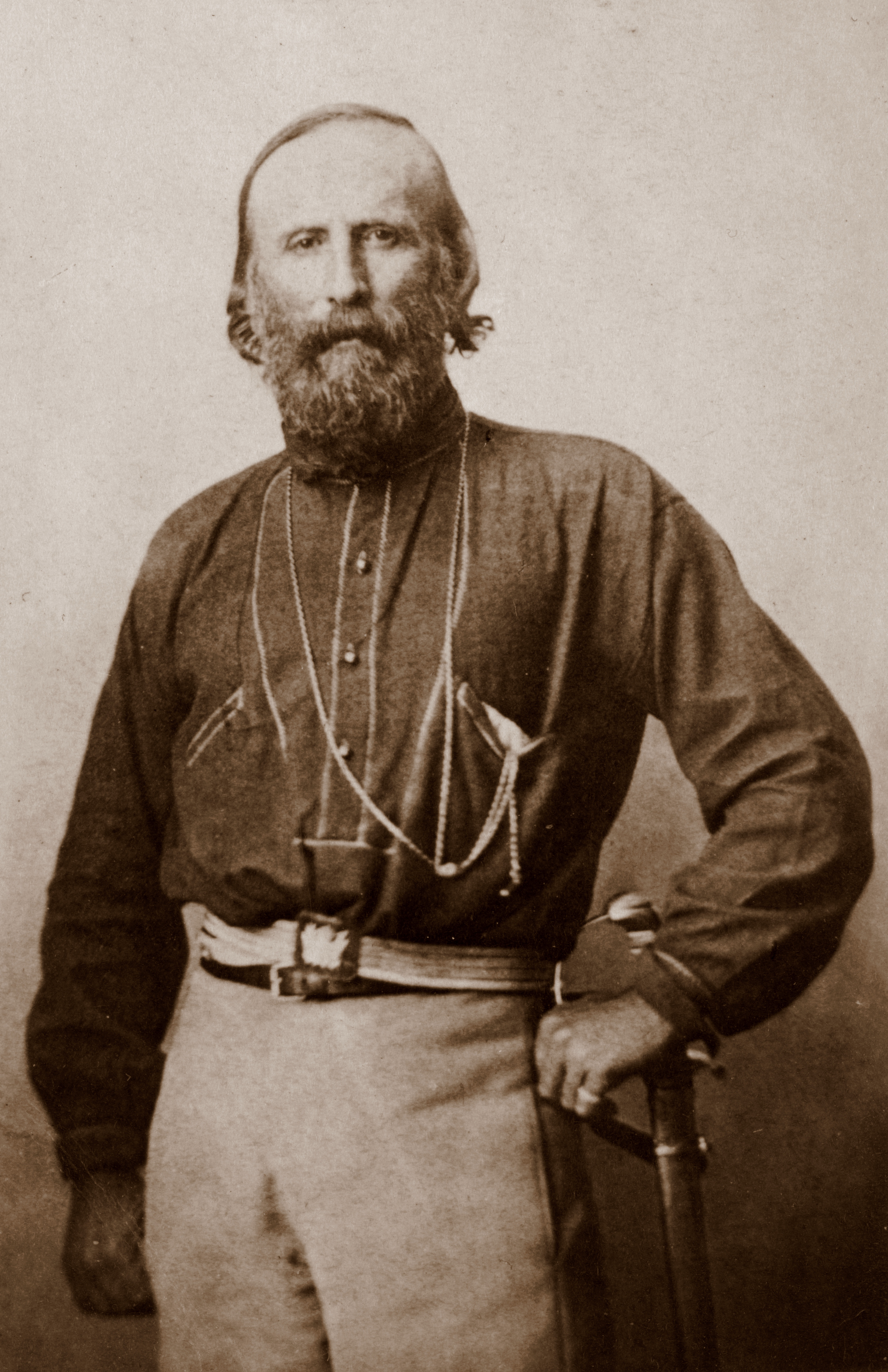
Giuseppe Mazzini (left), highly influential leader of the Italian revolutionary movement; and Giuseppe Garibaldi (right), celebrated as one of the greatest generals of modern times and as the "Hero of the Two Worlds" because of his military enterprises in South America and Europe, who fought in many military campaigns that led to Italian unification

The leader of the 1821 revolutionary movement in Piedmont was Santorre di Santarosa, who wanted to remove the Austrians and unify Italy under the House of Savoy. The Piedmont revolt started in Alessandria. The king's regent, prince Charles Albert, acting while the king Charles Felix was away, approved a new constitution to appease the revolutionaries, but when the king returned he disavowed the constitution and requested assistance from the Holy Alliance. Di Santarosa's troops were defeated, and the would-be Piedmontese revolutionary fled to Paris. Artistic and literary sentiment also turned towards nationalism; perhaps the most famous of proto-nationalist works was Alessandro Manzoni's I promessi sposi (The Betrothed), published in 1827. The 1840 version of I promessi sposi used a standardized version of the Tuscan dialect, a conscious effort by the author to provide a language and force people to learn it.

At the time, the struggle for Italian unification was perceived to be waged primarily against the Austrian Empire and the Habsburgs, since they directly controlled the predominantly Italian-speaking northeastern part of present-day Italy and were the single most powerful force against unification. The Austrian Empire vigorously repressed nationalist sentiment. Austrian Chancellor Franz Metternich, an influential diplomat at the Congress of Vienna, stated that the word Italy was nothing more than "a geographic expression." Those in favour of unification also faced opposition from the Holy See, particularly after failed attempts to broker a confederation with the Papal States, which would have left the Papacy with some measure of autonomy over the region. Pius IX feared that giving up power in the region could mean the persecution of Italian Catholics.

Even among those who wanted to see the peninsula unified, different groups could not agree on what form a unified state would take. Vincenzo Gioberti suggested a confederation of Italian states under the rulership of the Pope. His book, Of the Moral and Civil Primacy of the Italians, was published in 1843 and created a link between the Papacy and the Risorgimento. Many leading revolutionaries wanted a republic, but eventually, it was a king and his chief minister who had the power to unite the Italian states as a monarchy.

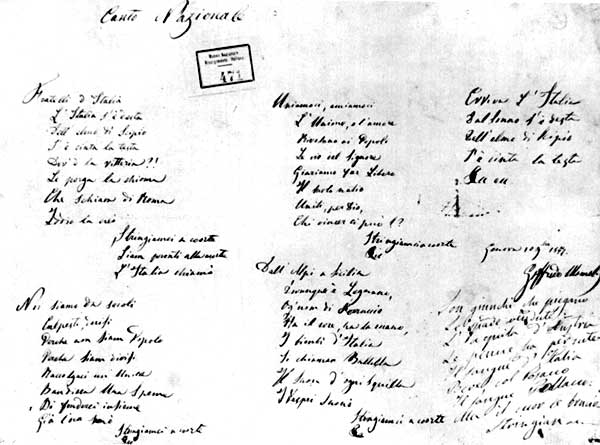
Holographic copy of 1847 of Il Canto degli Italiani, the Italian national anthem since 1946

One of the most influential revolutionary groups was the Carbonari (charcoal burners), a secret organization formed in southern Italy early in the 19th century. Inspired by the principles of the French Revolution, its members were mainly drawn from the middle class and intellectuals. After the Congress of Vienna, the Carbonari movement spread into the Papal States, the Kingdom of Sardinia, the Grand Duchy of Tuscany, the Duchy of Modena and the Kingdom of Lombardy–Venetia. The revolutionaries were so feared that the reigning authorities passed an ordinance condemning to death anyone who attended a Carbonari meeting. The Carbonari condemned Napoleon III to death for failing to unite Italy, and the group almost succeeded in assassinating him in 1858. Many leaders of the unification movement were at one time members of this organization. In this context, in 1847, the first public performance of the song Il Canto degli Italiani, the Italian national anthem since 1946, took place. Two prominent radical figures in the unification movement were Giuseppe Mazzini and Giuseppe Garibaldi. The more conservative constitutional monarchic figures included the Count of Cavour and Victor Emmanuel II, who would later become the first king of a united Italy. Mazzini's activity in revolutionary movements caused him to be imprisoned soon after he joined. While in prison, he concluded that Italy could – and therefore should – be unified and formulated his program for establishing a free, independent, and republican nation with Rome as its capital. After Mazzini's release in 1831, he went to Marseille, where he organized a new political society called La Giovine Italia (Young Italy) seeking the unification of Italy. Garibaldi participated in an uprising in Piedmont in 1834, was sentenced to death, and escaped to South America. He returned to Italy in 1848. The creation of the Kingdom of Italy was the result of concerted efforts by Italian nationalists and monarchists loyal to the House of Savoy to establish a united kingdom encompassing the entire Italian Peninsula.

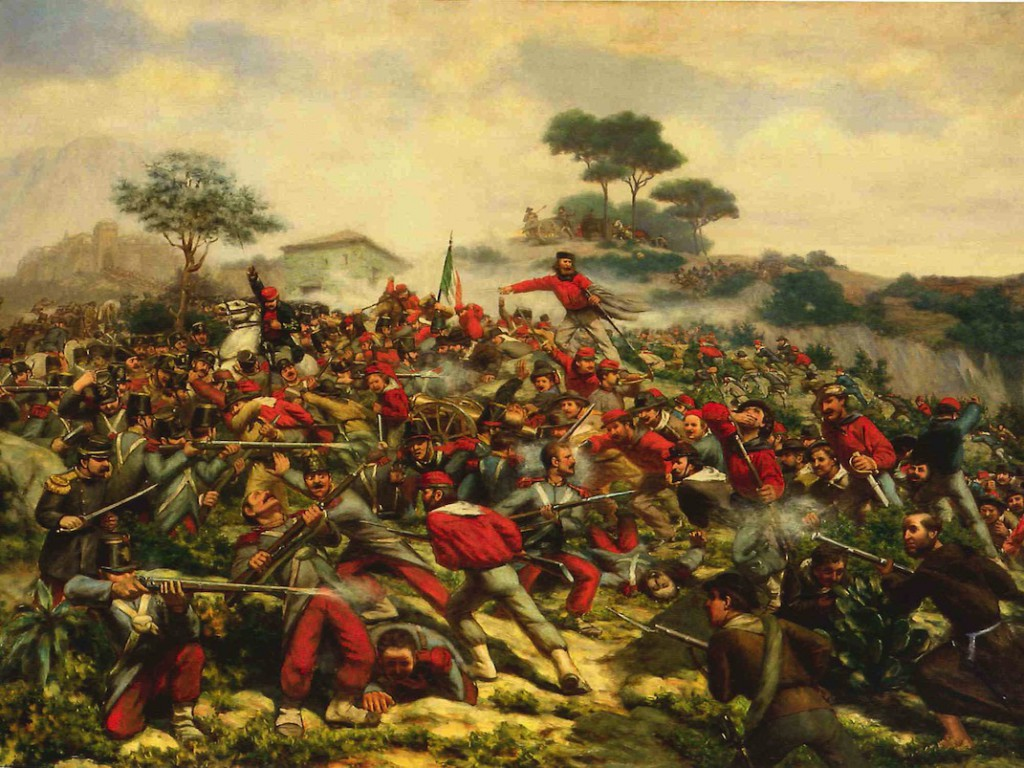
Battle of Calatafimi between Garibaldi's Redshirts and the troops of the Kingdom of the Two Sicilies, during the Expedition of the Thousand

Painting depicting the proclamation of the Kingdom of Italy in 1861

Sardinia industrialized from 1830 onward. A constitution, the Statuto Albertino was enacted in the year of revolutions, 1848, under liberal pressure. Under the same pressure, the First Italian War of Independence was declared on Austria. After initial success, the war took a turn for the worse and the Kingdom of Sardinia lost.

After the Revolutions of 1848, the apparent leader of the Italian unification movement was Garibaldi, popular amongst southern Italians. Garibaldi led the Italian republican drive for unification in southern Italy, but the northern Italian monarchy of the House of Savoy in the Kingdom of Piedmont-Sardinia whose government was led by Camillo Benso, Count of Cavour, also had the ambition of establishing a united Italian state. Although the kingdom had no physical connection to Rome (deemed the natural capital of Italy), the kingdom had successfully challenged Austria in the Second Italian War of Independence, liberating Lombardy–Venetia from Austrian rule. On the basis of the Plombières Agreement, the Kingdom of Sardinia ceded Savoy and Nice to France, an event that caused the Niçard exodus, that was the emigration of a quarter of the Niçard Italians to Italy. The kingdom also had established important alliances which helped it improve the possibility of Italian unification, such as Britain and France in the Crimean War.

Garibaldi was elected in 1871 in Nice at the National Assembly where he tried to promote the annexation of his hometown to the Italian unitary state, but he was prevented from speaking. Because of this denial, between 1871 and 1872 there were riots in Nice, promoted by the Garibaldini and called "Niçard Vespers", which demanded the annexation of the city and its area to Italy. Fifteen Nice people who participated in the rebellion were tried and sentenced.

=== Southern question and Italian diaspora ===
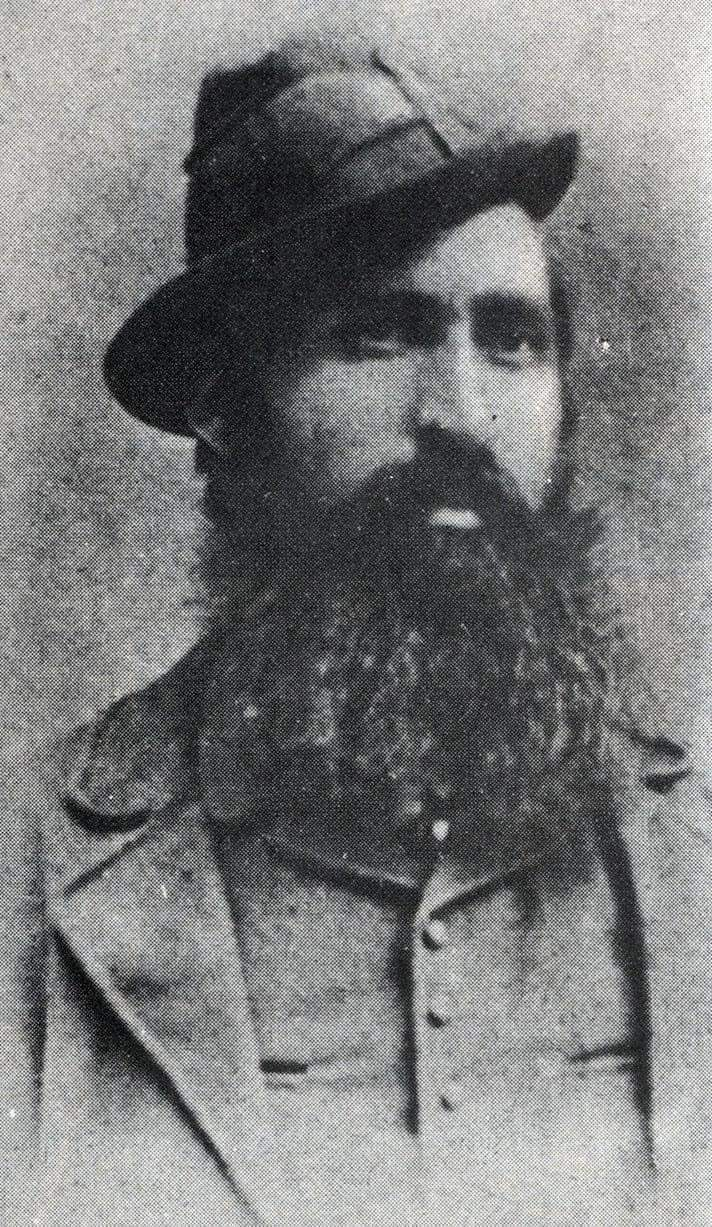
Carmine Crocco

The transition was not smooth for the south (the "Mezzogiorno"). The path to unification and modernization created a divide between Northern and Southern Italy called Southern question. The entire region south of Naples was afflicted with numerous deep economic and social liabilities. However, many of the South's political problems and its reputation of being "passive" or lazy (politically speaking) was due to the new government that alienated the South. On the other hand, transportation was difficult, soil fertility was low with extensive erosion, deforestation was severe, many businesses could stay open only because of high protective tariffs, large estates were often poorly managed, most peasants had only very small plots, and there was chronic unemployment and high crime rates.

Cavour decided the basic problem was poor government, and believed that could be remedied by strict application of the Piedmontese legal system. The main result was an upsurge in brigandage, which turned into a bloody civil war that lasted almost ten years. The insurrection reached its peak mainly in Basilicata and northern Apulia, headed by the brigands Carmine Crocco and Michele Caruso. With the end of the southern riots, there was an outflow of millions of peasants in the Italian diaspora, especially to the United States and South America. Others relocated to the northern industrial cities such as Genoa, Milan and Turin, and sent money home.

The first Italian diaspora began around 1880 and ended in the 1920s to the early 1940s with the rise of Fascist Italy. Poverty was the main reason for emigration, specifically the lack of land as mezzadria sharecropping flourished in Italy, especially in the South, and property became subdivided over generations. Especially in Southern Italy, conditions were harsh. Until the 1860s to 1950s, most of Italy was a rural society with many small towns and cities and almost no modern industry in which land management practices, especially in the South and the Northeast, did not easily convince farmers to stay on the land and to work the soil.

Another factor was related to the overpopulation of Southern Italy as a result of the improvements in socioeconomic conditions after Unification. That created a demographic boom and forced the new generations to emigrate en masse in the late 19th century and the early 20th century, mostly to the Americas. The new migration of capital created millions of unskilled jobs around the world and was responsible for the simultaneous mass migration of Italians searching for "work and bread" (Italian: pane e lavoro).

Unification broke down the feudal land system, which had survived in the south since the Middle Ages, especially where land had been the inalienable property of aristocrats, religious bodies or the king. The breakdown of feudalism, however, and redistribution of land did not necessarily lead to small farmers in the south winding up owning arable land. Many remained landless, and plots grew smaller and smaller and so less and less productive, as land was subdivided amongst heirs. Between 1860 and World War I, at least 9 million Italians left permanently of a total of 16 million who emigrated, most travelling to North or South America.

== Liberal period (1861–1922) ==
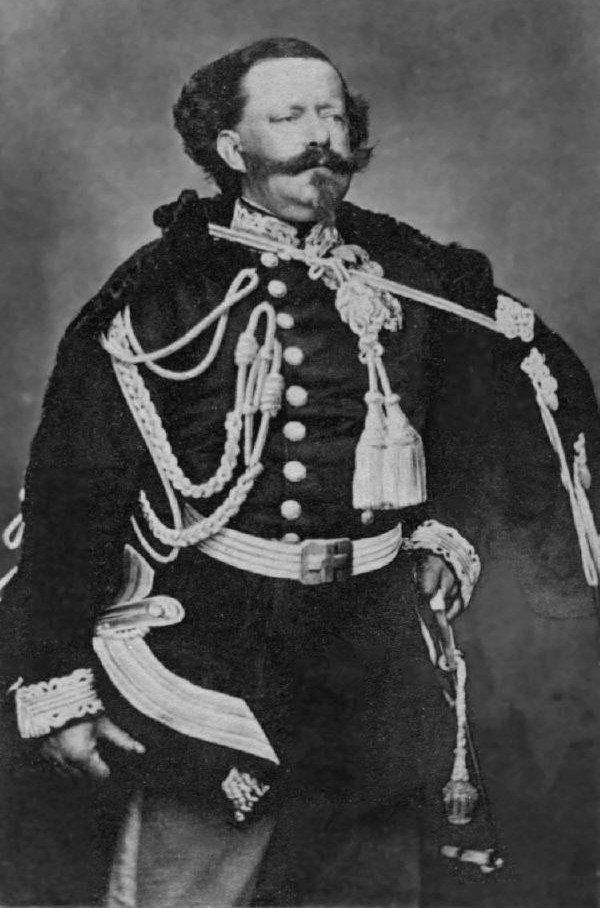
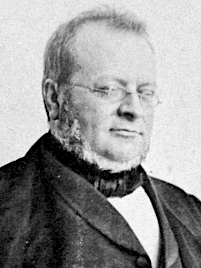
Victor Emmanuel II (left) and Camillo Benso, Count of Cavour (right), leading figures in the Italian unification, became respectively the 1st king and 1st Prime Minister of unified Italy.

Italy became a nation-state on 17 March 1861, when most of the states of the peninsula were united under king Victor Emmanuel II. The architects of Italian unification were Camillo Benso, Count of Cavour, and Giuseppe Garibaldi. In 1866, Prussian Prime Minister Otto von Bismarck offered Victor Emmanuel II an alliance with the Kingdom of Prussia in the Austro-Prussian War. In exchange Prussia would allow Italy to annex Austrian-controlled Venice. King Emmanuel agreed to the alliance and the Third Italian War of Independence began. The victory against Austria allowed Italy to annex Venice. In 1870, France started the Franco-Prussian War and brought home its soldiers in Rome; Italy marched in to take over the Papal State. Italian unification was completed, and the capital was moved from Florence to Rome. (Note: The Vatican City by the Lateran Treaty of 1929 became an independent country, an enclave surrounded by Italy.)

Some of the states that had been targeted for unification (terre irredente), Trentino-Alto Adige and Julian March, did not join the Kingdom of Italy until 1918 after Italy defeated Austria-Hungary in the First World War. For this reason, historians sometimes describe the unification period as reaching completion only with the Armistice of Villa Giusti on 4 November 1918.

Parliamentary democracy developed considerably in the 19th century. The Sardinian Statuto Albertino of 1848, extended to the whole Kingdom of Italy in 1861, provided for basic freedoms, but the electoral laws excluded the non-propertied and uneducated classes from voting. Italy's political arena was sharply divided between broad camps of left and right which created frequent deadlock and attempts to preserve governments. Marco Minghetti lost power in 1876 and was replaced by the Democrat Agostino Depretis, who began a period of political dominance in the 1880s, but continued attempts to appease the opposition to hold power.

Depretis began his term by initiating an experimental political idea called Trasformismo (transformism). The theory of Trasformismo was that a cabinet should select a variety of moderates and capable politicians from a non-partisan perspective. In practice, trasformismo was authoritarian and corrupt: Depretis pressured districts to vote for his candidates if they wished to gain favourable concessions from Depretis when in power, resulting in only four representatives from the right being elected in 1876. Depretis put through authoritarian measures, such as banning public meetings, placing "dangerous" individuals in internal exile on remote penal islands, and adopting militarist policies. Depretis enacted controversial legislation for the time, such as abolishing arrest for debt, making elementary education free and compulsory while ending compulsory religious teaching in elementary schools. The first government of Depretis collapsed after his dismissal of his Interior Minister, and ended with his resignation in 1877. The second government of Depretis started in 1881. Depretis' goals included widening suffrage in 1882 and increasing the tax intake from Italians by expanding the minimum requirements of who could pay taxes and the creation of a new electoral system. In 1887, Depretis was finally pushed out of office after years of political decline.

Francesco Crispi was prime minister from 1887 until 1891 and again from 1893 until 1896. Historian R.J.B. Bosworth says of his foreign policy that Crispi "pursued policies whose openly aggressive character would not be equaled until the days of the Fascist regime... His policies were ruinous, both for Italy's trade with France, and, more humiliatingly, for colonial ambitions in East Africa." Crispi's major concerns during 1887–91 was protecting Italy from Austria-Hungary. Crispi worked to build Italy as a great world power through increased military expenditures, advocation of expansionism, and trying to win Germany's favor even by joining the Triple Alliance. While helping Italy develop strategically, he continued trasformismo and was authoritarian, once suggesting the use of martial law to ban opposition parties. Despite being authoritarian, Crispi put through liberal policies such as the Public Health Act of 1888 and establishing tribunals for redress against abuses by the government.

The overwhelming attention paid to foreign policy alienated the agricultural community which needed help. Both radical and conservative forces in the Italian parliament demanded that the government investigate how to improve agriculture. The investigation showed that agriculture was not improving, that landowners were swallowing up revenue from their lands and contributing almost nothing to development of the land. There was aggravation by lower class Italians to the break-up of communal lands which benefited only landlords. Most of the workers on the agricultural lands were not peasants but short-term labourers who at best were employed for one year. Peasants without stable income were forced to live off meager food supplies, disease was spreading rapidly, plagues were reported, including a major cholera epidemic which killed at least 55,000 people. The Italian government could not deal with the situation effectively due to the mass overspending that left Italy in huge debt. Italy also suffered economically because of overproduction of grapes in the 1870s and 1880s when France's vineyard industry was suffering from vine disease. Italy during that time prospered as the largest exporter of wine in Europe but following the recovery of France in 1888, southern Italy was overproducing and had to split in two which caused greater unemployment and bankruptcies.

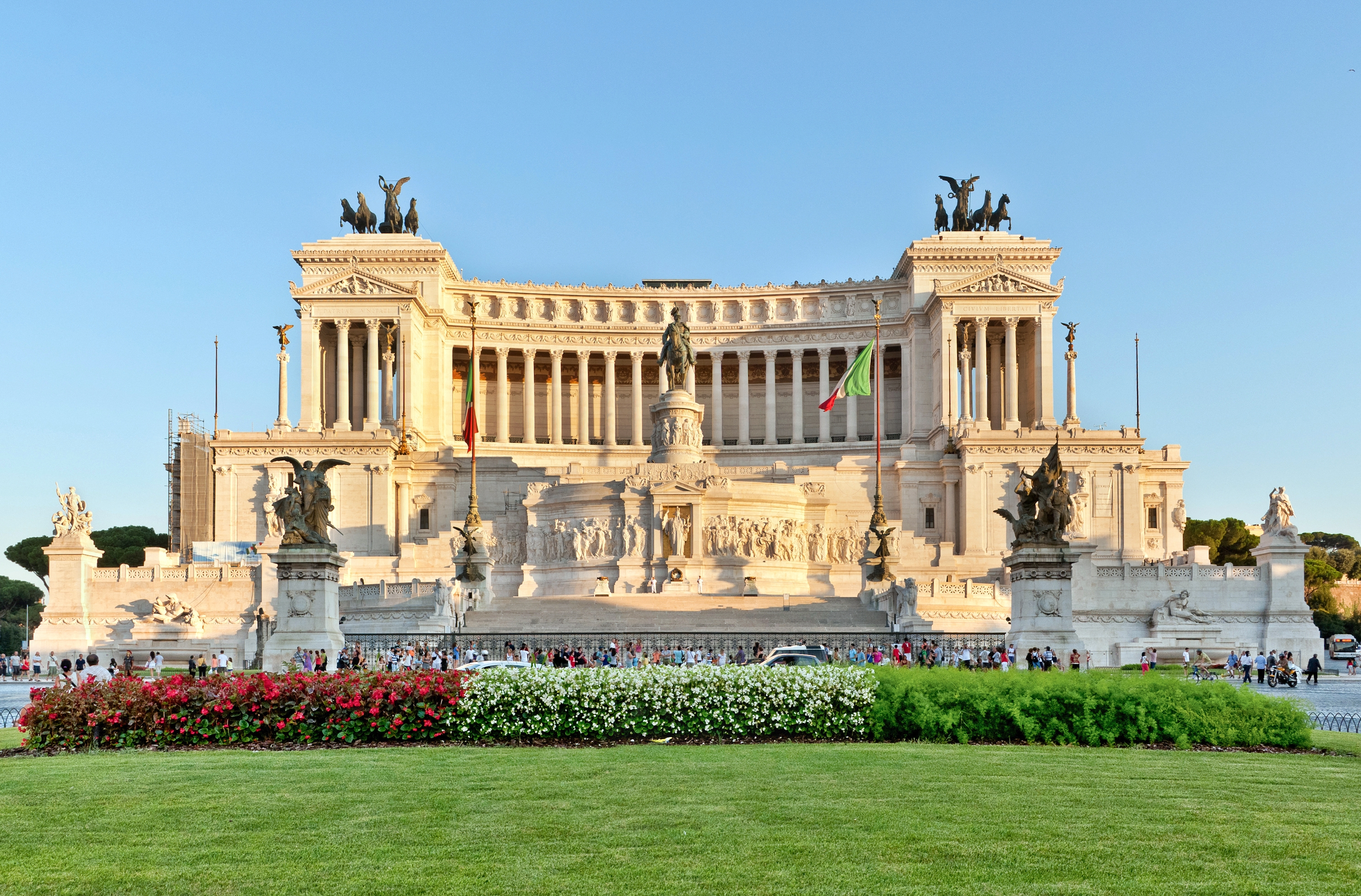
The Victor Emmanuel II Monument in Rome, a national symbol of Italy celebrating the first king of the unified country, and resting place of the Italian Unknown Soldier since the end of World War I. It was inaugurated in 1911, on the occasion of the 50th Anniversary of the Unification of Italy.

From 1901 to 1914, Italian history and politics was dominated by Giovanni Giolitti. He first confronted the wave of widespread discontent that Crispi's policy had provoked: no more authoritarian repression, but acceptance of protests and therefore of strikes, as long as they are neither violent nor political, with the (successful) aim of bringing the socialists in the political life of the country. Giolitti's most important interventions were social and labor legislation, universal male suffrage, the nationalization of the railways and insurance companies, the reduction of state debt, and the development of infrastructure and industry. In foreign policy, there was a movement away from Germany and Austria-Hungary and toward the Triple Entente of France, Britain and Russia.

Starting from the late 19th century, Italy developed its own colonial Empire. It took control of Somalia. Its attempt to occupy Ethiopia failed in the First Italo–Ethiopian War of 1895–1896. In 1911, Giolitti's government sent forces to occupy Libya and declared war on the Ottoman Empire. Italy soon annexed Libya (then divided in Tripolitania and Cyrenaica) and the Dodecanese Islands after the Italo-Turkish War. Nationalists advocated Italy's domination of the Mediterranean Sea by occupying Greece as well as the Adriatic coastal region of Dalmatia but no attempts were made. In June 1914 the left became repulsed by the government after the killing of three anti-militarist demonstrators. The Italian Socialist Party declared a general strike in Italy. The protests that ensued became known as "Red Week", as leftists rioted and various acts of civil disobedience occurred such as seizing railway stations, cutting telephone wires and burning tax-registers.

=== World War I and crisis of the Liberal state ===
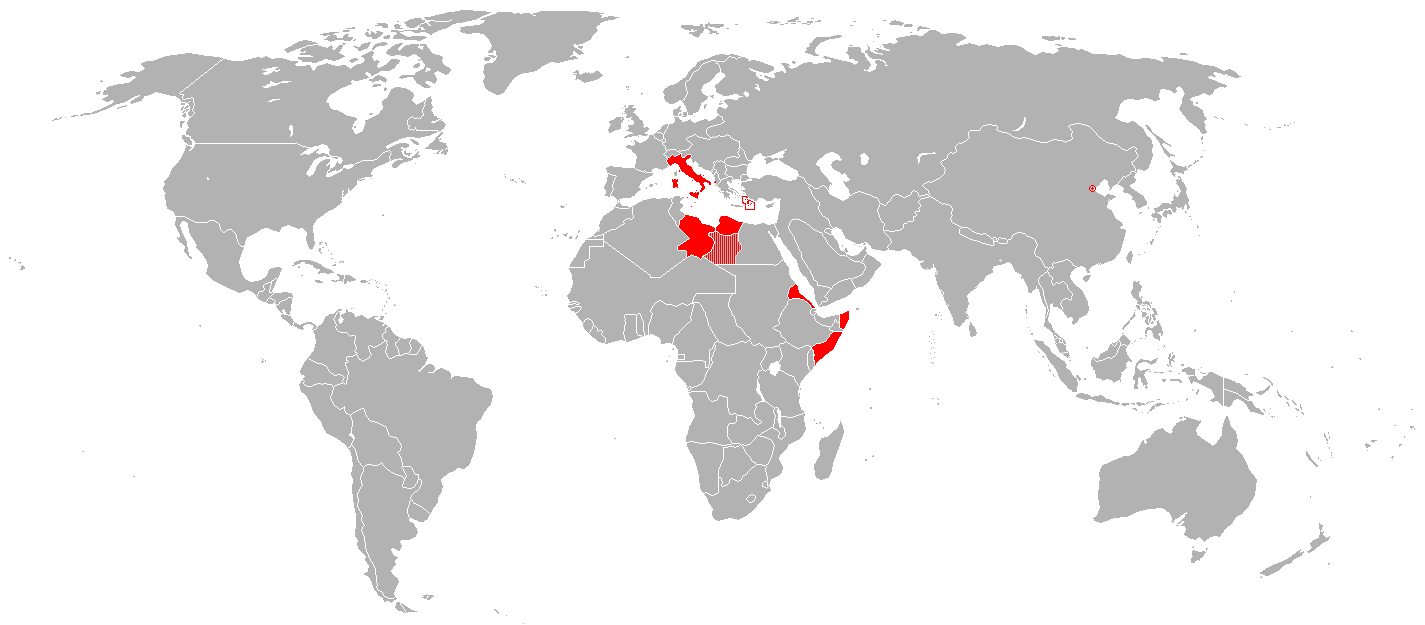
Italy and its colonial possessions in 1914

Italy entered into the First World War on 24 May 1915 with the aim of completing national unity: for this reason, it is also considered the Fourth Italian War of Independence, in a historiographical perspective that identifies in the latter the conclusion of the unification of Italy.

The war forced the decision whether to honour the alliance with Germany and Austria. For six months, Italy remained neutral, as the Triple Alliance was only for defensive purposes. Italy took the initiative in entering the war in spring 1915, despite strong popular and elite sentiment in favour of neutrality. Italy was, since its unification, the least of the great powers: a relatively large, but only partially industrialized country, whose political system was chaotic; its finances were heavily strained, and its army had not been prepared for a long conflict. The Triple Alliance meant little either to Italians or Austrians. Prime Minister Antonio Salandra and Foreign Minister Sidney Sonnino negotiated with both sides in secret for the best deal, and got one from the Entente, which was quite willing to promise large slices of the Austro-Hungarian Empire, including the Tyrol and Trieste, as well as making Albania a protectorate. Russia vetoed giving Italy Dalmatia. Britain was willing to pay subsidies and loans to get 36 million Italians as new allies who threatened the southern flank of Austria.

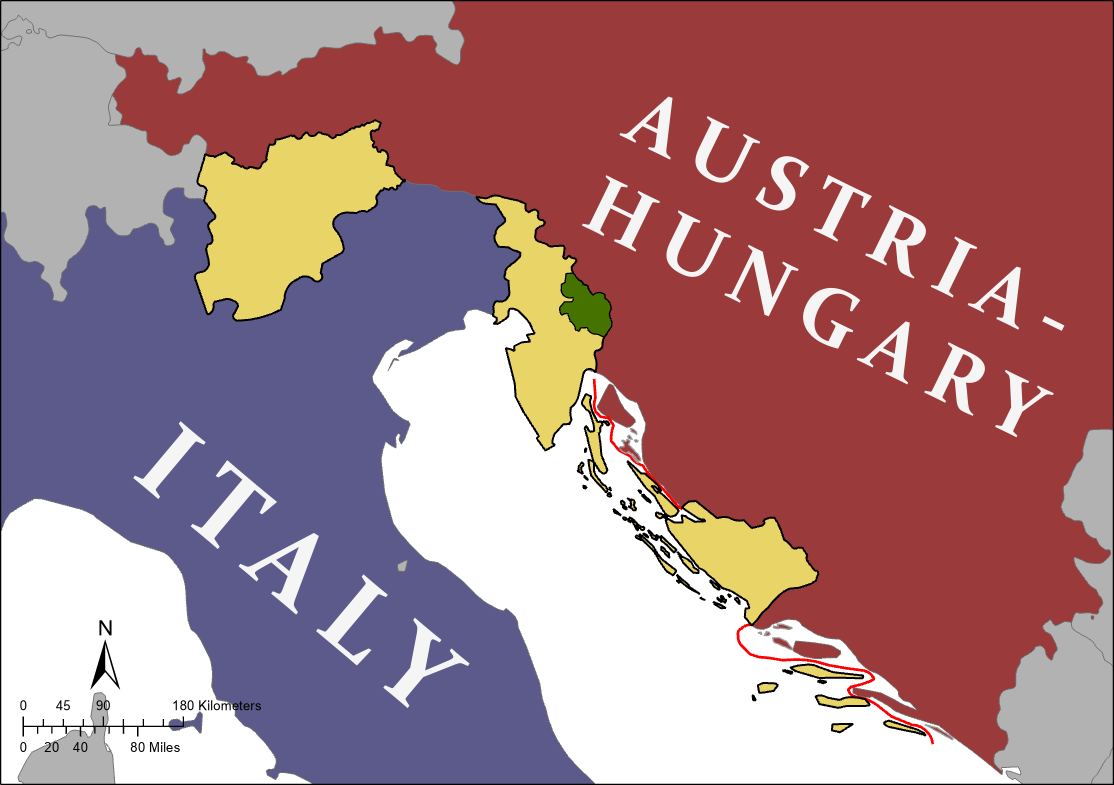
Territories promised to Italy by the secret Treaty of London (1915), i.e. Trentino-Alto Adige, the Julian March and Dalmatia (tan), and the Snežnik Plateau area (green). Dalmatia, after the WWI, however, was not assigned to Italy but to Yugoslavia.

When the Treaty of London was announced in May 1915, there was an uproar from antiwar elements. Reports from around Italy showed the people feared war, and cared little about territorial gains. Pro-war supporters mobbed the streets. The fervor for war represented a bitterly hostile reaction against politics as usual, and the failures, frustrations, and stupidities of the ruling class. Benito Mussolini created the newspaper Il Popolo d'Italia, which at first attempted to convince socialists and revolutionaries to support the war. The Allied Powers, eager to draw Italy to the war, helped finance the newspaper. Later, after the war, this publication would become the official newspaper of the Fascist movement.

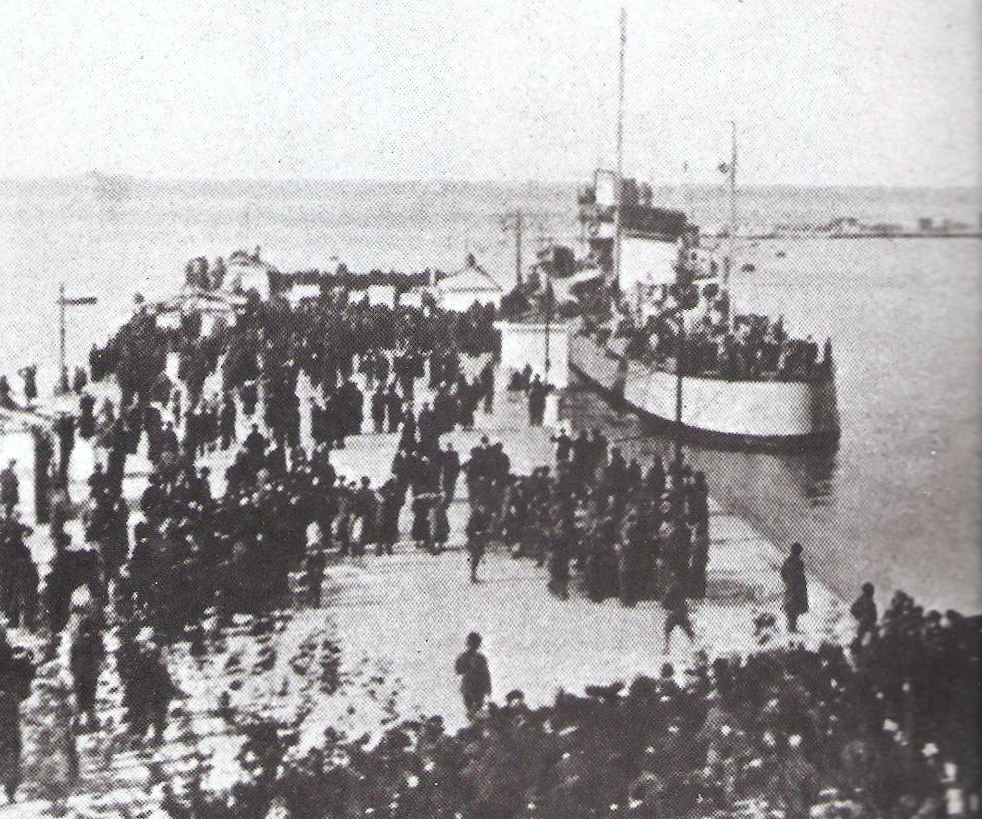
Italian troops landing in Trieste, 3 November 1918

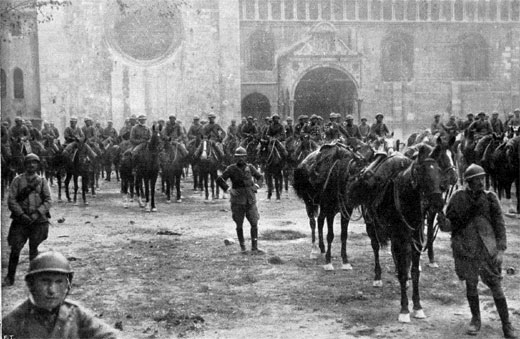
Italian cavalry in Trento on 3 November 1918, after the victorious Battle of Vittorio Veneto

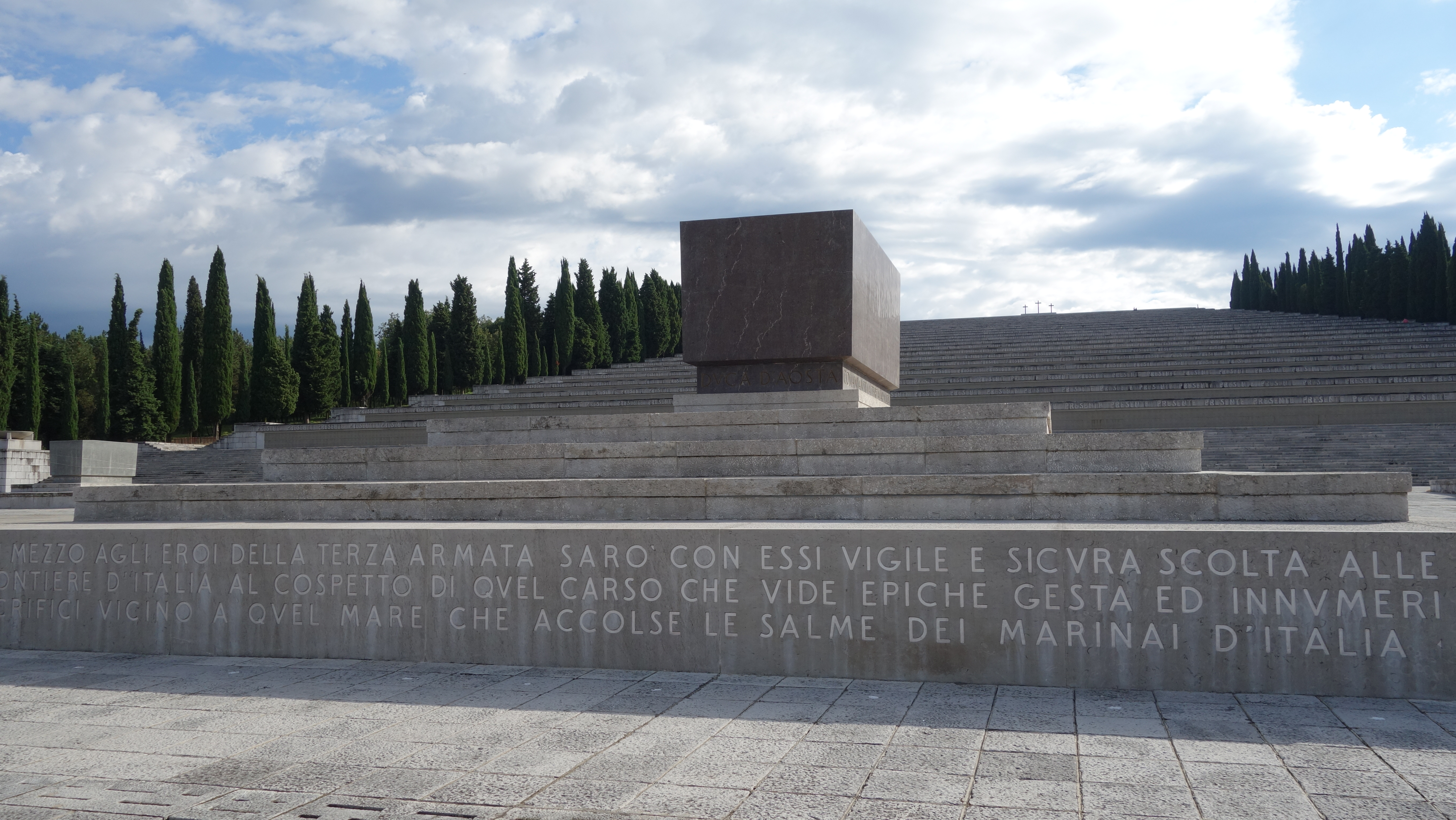
The Redipuglia War Memorial of Redipuglia, with the tomb of Prince Emanuele Filiberto, Duke of Aosta in the foreground

Italy entered the war with an army of 875,000 men, but the Austrians had terrain advantage and superior artillery and machine guns. Italy's war supplies had also been depleted in the war of 1911–12 against Turkey. Italy fought a long trench warfare, with fighting raging for three years on front along the Alps and the Isonzo River, and later on the Piave river. In 1916, Italy declared war on Germany. Some 650,000 Italian soldiers died and 950,000 were wounded, while the economy required large-scale Allied funding to survive.

Before the war the government had ignored labor issues, but now it had to intervene to mobilize war production. With the main working-class Socialist party reluctant to support the war effort, strikes were frequent and cooperation was minimal, especially in the Socialist strongholds of Piedmont and Lombardy. The government imposed high wage scales, as well as collective bargaining and insurance schemes. Many large firms expanded dramatically. Inflation doubled the cost of living. Industrial wages kept pace but not wages for farm workers. Discontent was high in rural areas since so many men were taken for service, industrial jobs were unavailable, wages grew slowly and inflation was just as bad.

The Italian victory, which was announced by the Bollettino della Vittoria and the Bollettino della Vittoria Navale, marked the end of the war on the Italian Front, secured the dissolution of the Austro-Hungarian Empire and was chiefly instrumental in ending the First World War less than two weeks later. More than 651,000 Italian soldiers died on the battlefields. The Italian civilian deaths were estimated at 589,000 due to malnutrition and food shortages. In November 1918, after the surrender of Austria-Hungary, Italy occupied militarily Trentino Alto-Adige, the Julian March, Istria, the Kvarner Gulf and Dalmatia, all Austro-Hungarian territories. On the Dalmatian coast, Italy established the Governorate of Dalmatia, which had the provisional aim of ferrying the territory towards full integration into the Kingdom of Italy, progressively importing national legislation in place of the previous one. The administrative capital was Zara. The Governorate of Dalmatia was evacuated following the Italo-Yugoslav agreements which resulted in the Treaty of Rapallo (1920), although Zara was annexed.

As the war came to an end, Italian Prime Minister Vittorio Emanuele Orlando met with British Prime Minister David Lloyd George, Prime Minister of France Georges Clemenceau and United States President Woodrow Wilson in Versailles to discuss how the borders of Europe should be redefined to help avoid a future European war. The talks provided considerable territorial gains to Italy, but not all those promised in the Treaty of London, as Wilson championed freedom to all European nationalities to form their nation-states. As a result, the Treaty of Versailles did not assign Dalmatia (inhabited by a Slavic majority) to Italy as had been promised. Furthermore, the British and French decided to divide the German and Ottoman overseas possessions into their mandates, with Italy receiving only some colonial compensations. Despite this, Orlando agreed to sign the Treaty of Versailles, which caused the uproar of nationalists against his government. The Treaty of Saint-Germain-en-Laye (1919) and the Treaty of Rapallo (1920) allowed the annexation of Trentino Alto-Adige, Julian March, Istria, Kvarner as well as the Dalmatian city of Zara.

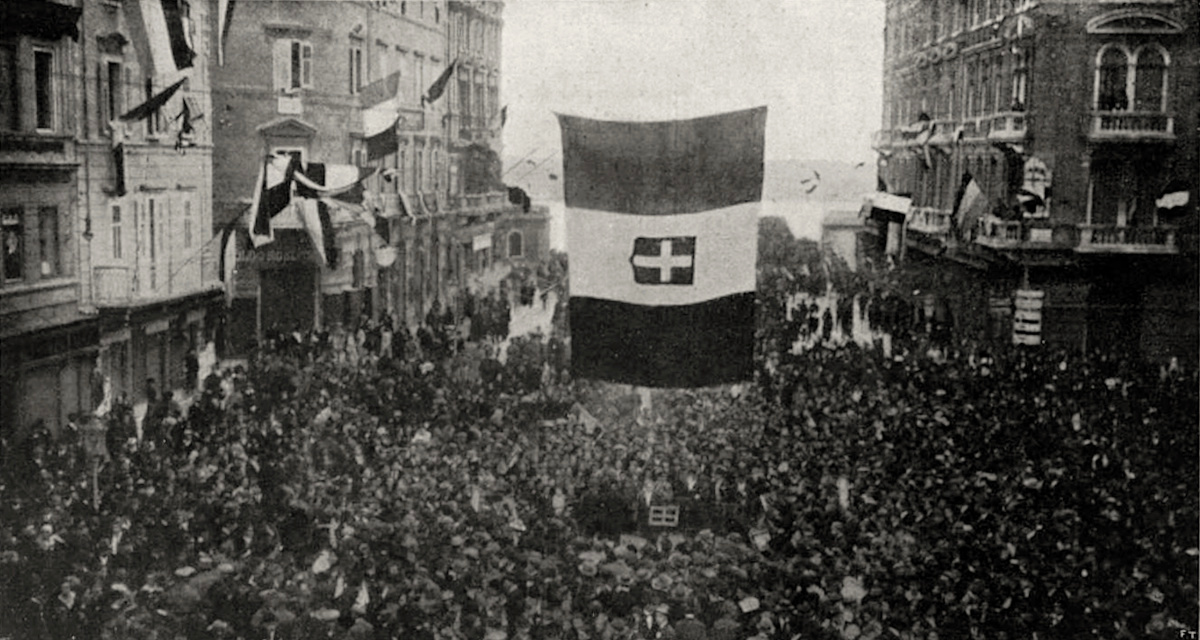
The celebration of the birthday of the Italian King Victor Emmanuel III on 11 November 1918, in Rijeka

Furious over the peace settlement, the Italian nationalist poet Gabriele D'Annunzio led disaffected war veterans and nationalists to form the Free State of Fiume in September 1919. His popularity among nationalists led him to be called Il Duce ("The Leader"), and he used black-shirted paramilitary in his assault on Fiume. The leadership title of Duce and the blackshirt paramilitary uniform would later be adopted by the fascist movement of Benito Mussolini. The demand for the Italian annexation of Fiume spread to all sides of the political spectrum. The Italians claimed Fiume on the principle of self-determination, disregarding its mainly Slavic suburb of Sušak.

The subsequent Treaty of Rome (1924) led to the annexation of the city of Fiume to Italy. Italy's lack of territorial gain led to the outcome being denounced as a mutilated victory. The rhetoric of mutilated victory was adopted by Mussolini and led to the rise of Italian fascism, becoming a key point in the propaganda of Fascist Italy. Historians regard mutilated victory as a "political myth", used by fascists to fuel Italian imperialism and obscure the successes of liberal Italy in the aftermath of World War I. Italy also gained a permanent seat in the League of Nations's executive council.

== Fascist regime and World War II (1922–1945) ==
=== Rise of Fascism into power ===
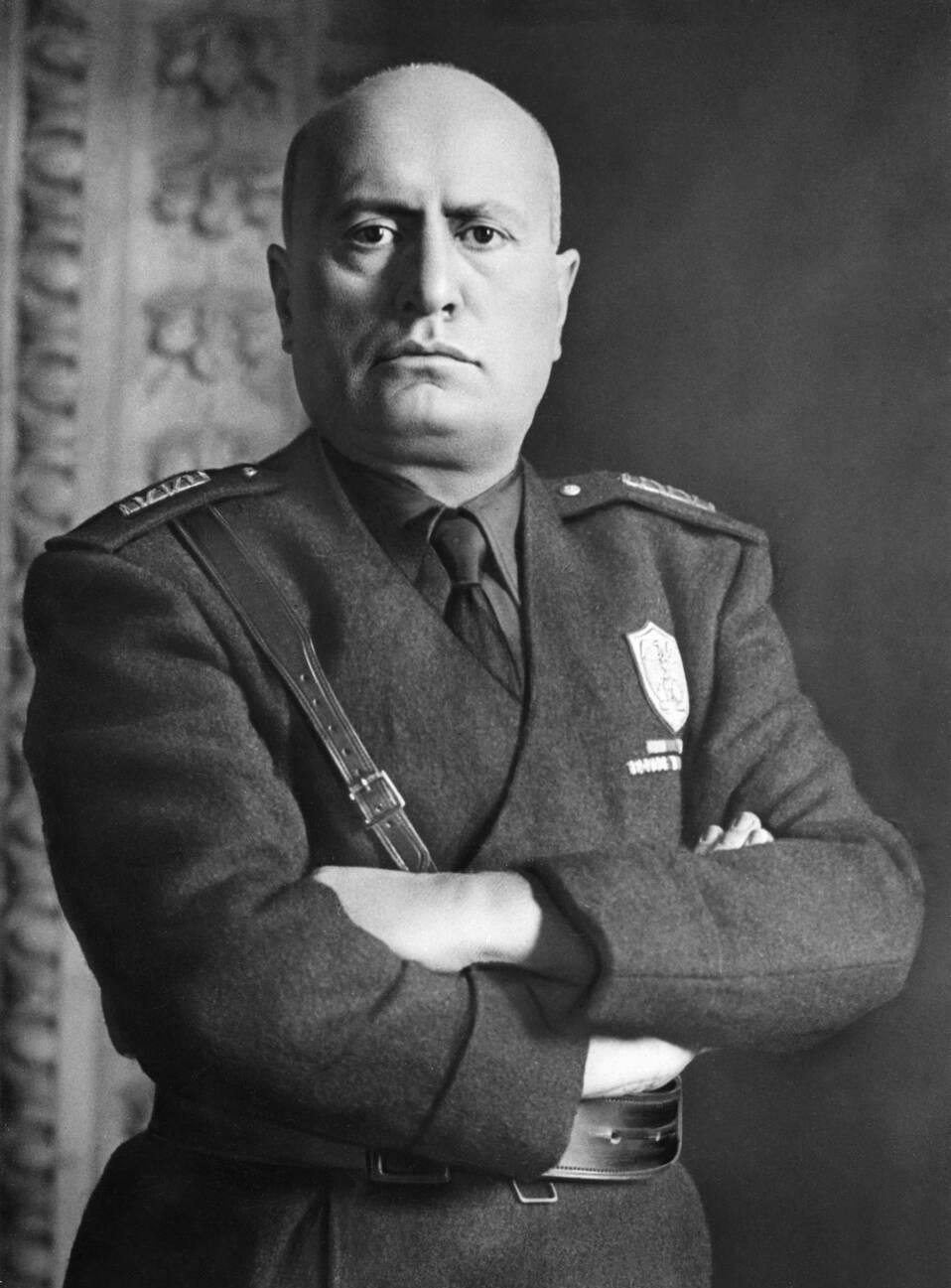
Benito Mussolini, who titled himself Duce and ruled the country from 1922 to 1943

Benito Mussolini created the Fasci di Combattimento or Combat League in 1919. It was originally dominated by patriotic socialist and syndicalist veterans who opposed the pacifist policies of the Italian Socialist Party. This early Fascist movement had a platform more inclined to the left, promising social revolution, proportional representation in elections, women's suffrage (partly realized in 1925) and dividing rural private property held by estates. They also differed from later Fascism by opposing censorship, militarism and dictatorship.

At the same time, the so-called Biennio Rosso (red biennium) took place in the two years following the war in a context of economic crisis, high unemployment and political instability. The 1919–20 period was characterized by mass strikes, worker manifestations as well as self-management experiments through land and factory occupations. In Turin and Milan, workers councils were formed and many factory occupations took place under the leadership of anarcho-syndicalists. The agitations also extended to the agricultural areas of the Padan plain and were accompanied by peasant strikes, rural unrests and guerilla conflicts between left-wing and right-wing militias. Thenceforth, the Fasci di Combattimento (forerunner of the National Fascist Party, 1921) successfully exploited the claims of Italian nationalists and the quest for order and normalization of the middle class. In October 1922, Mussolini took advantage of a general strike to announce his demands to the Italian government to give the Fascist Party political power or face a coup. With no immediate response, a group of 30,000 Fascists began a long trek across Italy to Rome (the March on Rome), claiming that Fascists were intending to restore law and order. The Fascists demanded Prime Minister Luigi Facta's resignation and that Mussolini be named to the post. Although the Italian Army was far better armed than the Fascist militias, the liberal system and King Victor Emmanuel III were facing a deeper political crisis. The King was forced to choose which of the two rival movements in Italy would form the government: Mussolini's Fascists, or the marxist Italian Socialist Party. He selected the Fascists.

Mussolini formed a coalition with nationalists and liberals, and in 1923 passed the electoral Acerbo Law, which assigned two thirds of the seats to the party that achieved at least 25% of the vote. The Fascist Party used violence and intimidation to achieve the threshold in the 1924 election, thus obtaining control of Parliament. Socialist deputy Giacomo Matteotti was assassinated after calling for a nullification of the vote. The parliament opposition responded to Matteotti's assassination with the Aventine Secession.

Over the next four years, Mussolini eliminated nearly all checks and balances on his power. On 24 December 1925, he passed a law that declared he was responsible to the king alone, making him the sole person able to determine Parliament's agenda. Local governments were dissolved, and appointed officials (called "Podestà") replaced elected mayors and councils. In 1928, all political parties were banned, and parliamentary elections were replaced by plebiscites in which the Grand Council of Fascism nominated a single list of 400 candidates. Christopher Duggan argues that his regime exploited Mussolini's popular appeal and forged a cult of personality that served as the model that was emulated by dictators of other fascist regimes of the 1930s.

In summary, historian Stanley G. Payne says that Fascism in Italy was:

A primarily political dictatorship. The Fascist Party itself had become almost completely bureaucratized and subservient to, not dominant over, the state itself. Big business, industry, and finance retained extensive autonomy, particularly in the early years. The armed forces also enjoyed considerable autonomy. ... The Fascist militia was placed under military control. The judicial system was left largely intact and relatively autonomous as well. The police continued to be directed by state officials and were not taken over by party leaders, nor was a major new police elite created. There was never any question of bringing the Church under overall subservience. Sizable sectors of Italian cultural life retained extensive autonomy, and no major state propaganda-and-culture ministry existed. The Mussolini regime was neither especially sanguinary nor particularly repressive.

=== End of the Roman question ===
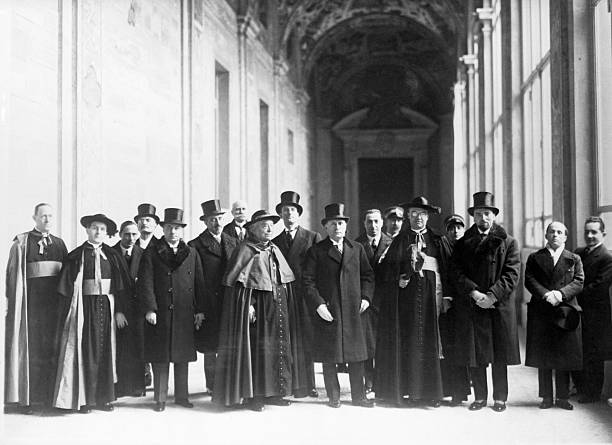
Vatican and Italian delegations prior to signing the Lateran Treaty

During the unification of Italy in the mid-19th century, the Papal States resisted incorporation into the new nation. The nascent Kingdom of Italy invaded and occupied Romagna (the eastern portion of the Papal States) in 1860, leaving only Latium in the pope's domains. Latium, including Rome itself, was occupied and annexed in 1870. For the following sixty years, relations between the Papacy and the Italian government were hostile, and the status of the pope became known as the "Roman Question".

The Lateran Treaty was one component of the Lateran Pacts of 1929, agreements between the Kingdom of Italy under King Victor Emmanuel III of Italy and the Holy See under Pope Pius XI to settle the question. The treaty and associated pacts were signed on 11 February 1929. The treaty recognized Vatican City as an independent state under the sovereignty of the Holy See. The Italian government also agreed to give the Roman Catholic Church financial compensation for the loss of the Papal States. In 1948, the Lateran Treaty was recognized in the Constitution of Italy as regulating the relations between the state and the Catholic Church. The treaty was significantly revised in 1984, ending the status of Catholicism as the sole state religion.

=== Foreign politics ===
Lee identifies three major themes in Mussolini's foreign policy. The first was a continuation of the foreign-policy objectives of the preceding Liberal regime. Liberal Italy had allied itself with Germany and Austria, and had great ambitions in the Balkans and North Africa. Ever since it had been badly defeated in Ethiopia in 1896, there was a strong demand for seizing that country. Second was a profound disillusionment after the heavy losses of the First World War; the small territorial gains from Austria were not enough to compensate. Third was Mussolini's promise to restore the pride and glory of the Roman Empire.

Italian Fascism is based upon Italian nationalism and in particular, seeks to complete what it considers as the incomplete project of Risorgimento by incorporating Italia Irredenta (unredeemed Italy) into the state of Italy. To the east of Italy, the Fascists claimed that Dalmatia was a land of Italian culture. To the south, the Fascists claimed Malta, which belonged to the United Kingdom, and Corfu, which belonged to Greece, to the north claimed Italian Switzerland, while to the west claimed Corsica, Nice and Savoy, which belonged to France.

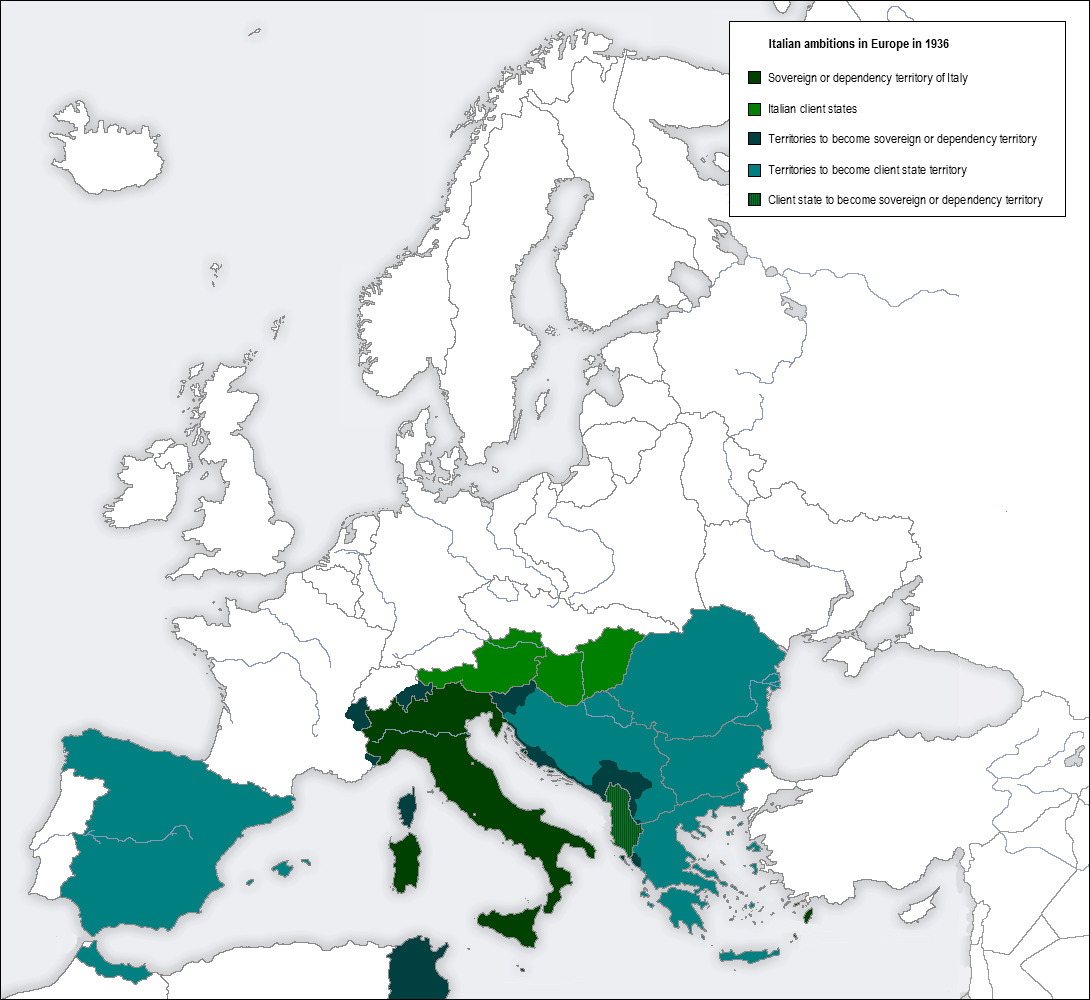
Ambitions of fascist Italy in Europe in 1936. Legend: Metropolitan Italy and dependent territories: Client states; Claimed territories to be annexed; Territories to be transformed into client states. Albania, which was a client state, was considered a territory to be annexed.

Mussolini promised to bring Italy back as a great power in Europe, building a "New Roman Empire" and holding power over the Mediterranean Sea. In propaganda, Fascists used the ancient Roman motto "Mare Nostrum" (Latin for "Our Sea") to describe the Mediterranean. For this reason the Fascist regime engaged in interventionist foreign policy in Europe. In 1923, the Greek island of Corfu was briefly occupied by Italy, after the assassination of General Tellini in Greek territory. In 1925, Albania came under heavy Italian influence as a result of the Tirana Treaties, which also gave Italy a stronger position in the Balkans. Relations with France were mixed. The Fascist regime planned to regain Italian-populated areas of France. With the rise of Nazism, it became more concerned about the potential threat of Germany to Italy. Due to concerns about German expansionism, Italy joined the Stresa Front with France and the United Kingdom, which existed from 1935 to 1936. The Fascist regime held negative relations with Yugoslavia, as it continued to claim Dalmatia.

During the Spanish Civil War between the socialist Republicans and Nationalists led by Francisco Franco, Italy sent arms and over 60,000 troops to aid the Nationalist faction. This secured Italy's naval access to Spanish ports and increased Italian influence in the Mediterranean. During the 1930s, Italy strongly pursued a policy of naval rearmament; by 1940, the Regia Marina was the fourth-largest navy in the world.

Mussolini and Adolf Hitler first met in June 1934, when Mussolini opposed German plans to annex Austria to ensure that Nazi Germany would not become hegemonic in Europe. Public appearances and propaganda constantly portrayed the closeness of Mussolini and Hitler and the similarities between Italian Fascism and German National Socialism. While both ideologies had significant similarities, the two factions were suspicious of each other, and both leaders were in competition for world influence.

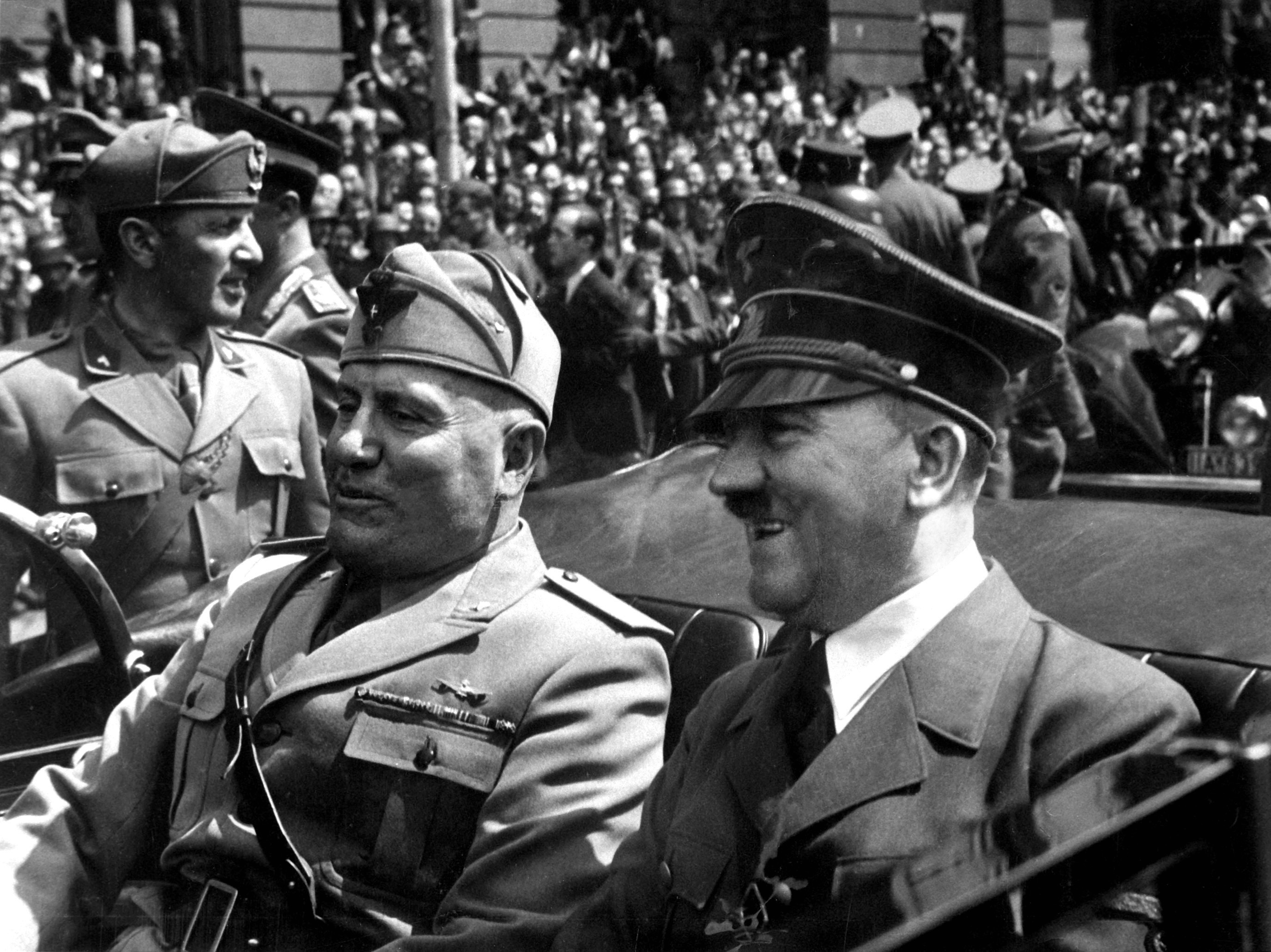
Mussolini and Hitler in June 1940

In 1935 Mussolini decided to invade Ethiopia; 2,313 Italians and 275,000 Ethiopians died. The Second Italo-Ethiopian War resulted in the international isolation of Italy; the only nation to back Italy's aggression was Germany. After being condemned by the League of Nations, Italy decided to leave the League on 11 December 1937. Mussolini had little choice but to join Hitler in international politics, thus he reluctantly abandoned support of Austrian independence. Mussolini later supported German claims on Sudetenland at the Munich Conference. In 1938, under the influence of Hitler, Mussolini supported the adoption of anti-semitic racial laws in Italy. After Germany annexed Czechoslovakia in March 1939, Italy invaded Albania and made it an Italian protectorate.

As war approached in 1939, the Fascist regime stepped up an aggressive press campaign against France claiming that its Italian residents were suffering. This was important to the alliance as both regimes mutually had claims on France: Germany on German-populated Alsace-Lorraine and Italy on the mixed Italian and French populated Nice and Corsica. In May 1939, a formal alliance with Germany was signed, known as the Pact of Steel. Mussolini felt obliged to sign the pact in spite of his own concerns that Italy could not fight a war in the near future. This obligation grew from his promises to Italians that he would build an empire for them and from his personal desire to not allow Hitler to become the dominant leader in Europe. Mussolini was repulsed by the Molotov–Ribbentrop Pact agreement where Germany and the Soviet Union agreed to partition the Second Polish Republic into German and Soviet zones for an impending invasion. The Fascist government saw this as a betrayal of the Anti-Comintern Pact, but decided to remain officially silent.

=== World War II and fall of Fascism ===
Areas controlled by the Italian Empire during its existence Kingdom of Italy Colonies of Italy Protectorates and areas occupied during World War II

When Germany invaded Poland on 1 September 1939 beginning World War II, Mussolini chose to stay non-belligerent, although he declared his support for Hitler. In drawing out war plans, Mussolini and the Fascist regime decided that Italy would aim to annex large portions of Africa and the Middle East. Hesitance remained from the King and military commander Pietro Badoglio who warned Mussolini that Italy had too few tanks, armoured vehicles, and aircraft available to be able to carry out a long-term war. Mussolini and the Fascist regime thus waited as France was invaded by Germany in June 1940 (Battle of France) before deciding to get involved.

Italy entered the war on 10 June 1940, fulfilling its obligations towards the Pact of Steel. Mussolini hoped to quickly capture Savoy, Nice, Corsica, and the African colonies of Tunisia and Algeria from the French, but Germany signed an armistice (22 June: Second Armistice at Compiègne) with Marshal Philippe Pétain establishing Vichy France, that retained control over southern France and colonies. This decision angered the Fascist regime. In summer 1940, Mussolini ordered the bombing of Mandatory Palestine and the conquest of British Somaliland. In September, he ordered the invasion of Egypt; despite initial success, Italian forces were soon driven back by the British (see Operation Compass). Hitler had to intervene with the sending of the Afrika Korps that was the mainstay in the North African campaign.

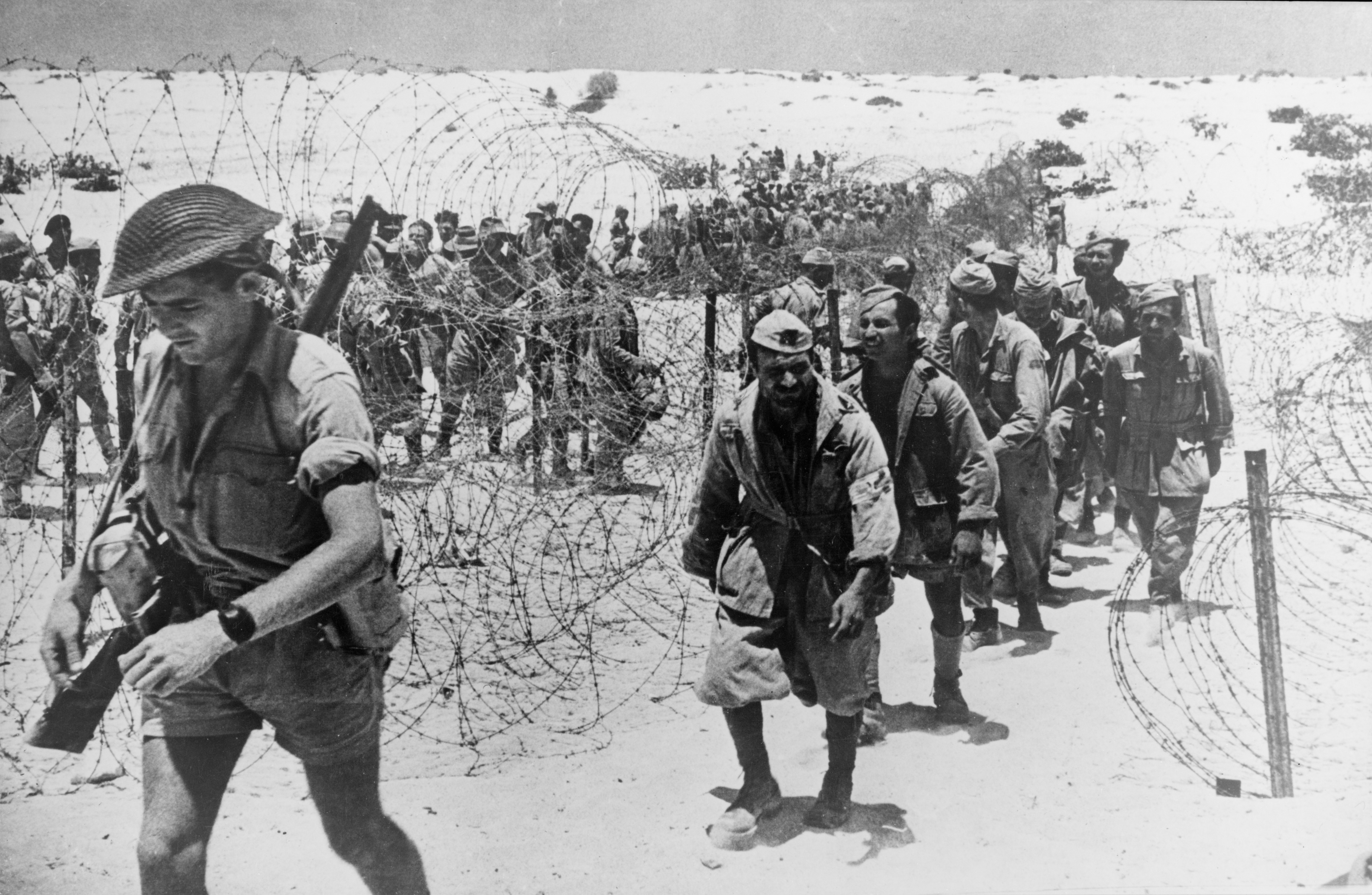
Italian prisoners in El Alamein, November 1942

On 28 October, Mussolini launched an attack on Greece. The Royal Air Force prevented the Italian invasion and allowed the Greeks to push the Italians back to Albania. Hitler came to Mussolini's aid by attacking the Greeks through the Balkans. The Balkans Campaign had as a result the dissolution of Yugoslavia and Greece's defeat. Italy gained southern Slovenia, Dalmatia, Montenegro and established the puppet states of Croatia and Hellenic State. By 1942, it was faltering as its economy failed to adapt to the conditions of war and Italian cities were being heavily bombed by the Allies. Also, despite Rommel's advances, the campaign in North Africa began to fail in late 1942. The complete collapse came after the decisive defeat at El Alamein.

By 1943, Italy was losing on every front. Half of the Italian forces fighting in the Soviet Union had been destroyed, the African campaign had failed, the Balkans remained unstable, and Italians wanted an end to the war.

In July 1943, the Allies invaded Sicily in an effort to knock Italy out of the war and establish a foothold in Europe. On 25 July, Mussolini was ousted by the Great Council of Fascism and arrested by order of King Victor Emmanuel III, who appointed General Pietro Badoglio as new prime minister. Badoglio stripped away the final elements of Fascist rule by banning the National Fascist Party, then signed an armistice with the Allied armed forces.

There is controversy on the effectiveness of Italy's performance in World War II. Donald Detwiler notes that "Italy's entrance into the war showed very early that her military strength was only a hollow shell." MacGregor Knox argues that it was "first and foremost a failure of Italy's military culture and military institutions." Norman Polmar and Thomas B. Allen argue that "the Regia Aeronautica failed to perform effectively in modern conflict." James Sadkovich argues that inferior equipment, overextension, and inter-service rivalries meant that Italians had "more than their share of handicaps." Several authors (James Sadkovich, Peter Haining, Vincent O'Hara, Ian Walker and others) have reassessed the performance of the Italian army, navy and air force, providing numerous examples of actions where Italian forces were effective. Gerhard L.Weinberg argues that "there is far too much denigration of the performance of Italy's forces during the conflict."

==== Italian resistance, co-belligerence with the Allies and Liberation ====
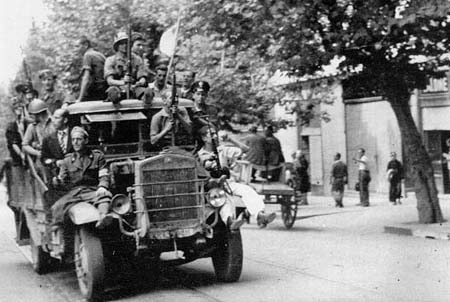
Insurgents celebrating the liberation of Naples after the Four days of Naples (27–30 September 1943)

Soon after being ousted, Mussolini was rescued by a German commando in Operation Eiche ("Oak"). The Germans brought Mussolini to northern Italy where he set up a Fascist puppet state, the Italian Social Republic (RSI). Meanwhile, the Allies advanced in southern Italy. In September 1943, Naples rose against the occupying German forces. The Allies organized some royalist Italian troops into the Italian Co-Belligerent Army, while other troops continued to fight alongside Nazi Germany in the Esercito Nazionale Repubblicano, the National Republican Army. A large Italian resistance movement started a long guerrilla war against the German and Fascist forces, while clashes between the Fascist RSI Army and the Royalist Italian Co-Belligerent Army were rare. The Germans, often helped by Fascists, committed several atrocities against Italian civilians in occupied zones, such as the Ardeatine massacre and the Sant'Anna di Stazzema massacre. The Kingdom of Italy declared war on Nazi Germany on 13 October 1943; tensions between the Axis Powers and the Italian military were rising following the failure to defend Sicily.

On 4 June 1944, the German occupation of Rome came to an end as the Allies advanced. The final Allied victory over the Axis in Italy did not come until the spring offensive of 1945, after Allied troops had breached the Gothic Line, leading to the surrender of German and Fascist forces in Italy on 2 May shortly before Germany finally surrendered ending World War II in Europe on 8 May. It is estimated that between September 1943 and April 1945, some 60,000 Allied and 50,000 German soldiers died in Italy. (Note: In Alexander's Generals Blaxland quotes 59,151 Allied deaths between 3 September 1943 and 2 May 1945 as recorded at AFHQ and gives the breakdown between 20 nationalities: United States 20,442; United Kingdom, 18,737; France, Morocco, Algeria, Tunisia, Senegal and Belgium 5,241; Canada, 4,798; India, Pakistan, Nepal 4,078; Poland 2,028; New Zealand 1,688; Italy (excluding irregulars) 917; South Africa 800; Brazil 275; Greece 115; Jewish volunteers from the British Mandate in Palestine 32. In addition, 35 soldiers were killed by enemy action while serving with pioneer units from Botswana, Lesotho, Swaziland, Seychelles, Mauritius, Sri Lanka, Lebanon, Cyprus and the West Indies)

During World War II, Italian war crimes included extrajudicial killings and ethnic cleansing by the deportation of about 25,000 people, mainly Jews, Croats, and Slovenians, to the Italian concentration camps, such as Rab, Gonars, Monigo, Renicci di Anghiari and elsewhere. Yugoslav Partisans perpetrated their own crimes against the local ethnic Italian population during and after the war, including the foibe massacres. In Italy and Yugoslavia, unlike in Germany, few war crimes were prosecuted.

On 25 April 1945 the National Liberation Committee for Northern Italy proclaimed a general insurrection in all the territories still occupied by the Nazis, indicating to all the partisan forces active in Northern Italy that were part of the Volunteer Corps of Freedom to attack the fascist and German garrisons by imposing the surrender, days before the arrival of the Allied troops; at the same time, the National Liberation Committee for Northern Italy personally issued legislative decrees, assuming power "in the name of the Italian people and as a delegate of the Italian Government", establishing among other things the death sentence for all fascist hierarchs, Today the event is commemorated in Italy every 25 April by the Liberation Day, National Day introduced on 22 April 1946, which celebrates the liberation of the country from fascism.

Mussolini was captured on 27 April 1945 and the next day was executed for high treason. On 2 May 1945, the German forces in Italy surrendered. On 9 June 1944, Badoglio was replaced as prime minister by anti-fascist leader Ivanoe Bonomi. In June 1945 Bonomi was in turn replaced by Ferruccio Parri, who in turn gave way to Alcide de Gasperi on 4 December 1945. Finally, De Gasperi supervised the transition to a Republic following the abdication of Vittorio Emanuele III on 9 May 1946, the one-month-long reign of his son Umberto II ("King of May") and the Constitutional Referendum that abolished the monarchy; De Gasperi briefly became acting Head of State as well as prime minister on 18 June 1946, but ceded the former role to Provisional President Enrico de Nicola ten days later.

=== Anti-fascism against Mussolini's regime ===
Flag of Arditi del Popolo, an axe cutting a fasces. Arditi del Popolo was a militant anti-fascist group founded in 1921.

In Italy, Mussolini's fascist regime used the term anti-fascist to describe its opponents. Mussolini's secret police was officially known as the Organization for Vigilance and Repression of Anti-Fascism (OVRA). During the 1920s, anti-fascists, many of them from the labour movement, fought against the violent Blackshirts and against the rise of the fascist leader Benito Mussolini. After the Italian Socialist Party (PSI) signed a pacification pact with Mussolini and his Fasces of Combat on 3 August 1921, and trade unions adopted a legalist and pacified strategy, members of the workers' movement who disagreed with this strategy formed Arditi del Popolo.

The Italian General Confederation of Labour (CGL) and the PSI refused to officially recognize the anti-fascist militia and maintained a non-violent, legalist strategy, while the Communist Party of Italy (PCd'I) ordered its members to quit the organization. The PCd'I organized some militant groups, but their actions were relatively minor. The Italian anarchist Severino Di Giovanni, who exiled himself to Argentina following the 1922 March on Rome, organized several bombings against the Italian fascist community. The Italian liberal anti-fascist Benedetto Croce wrote his Manifesto of the Anti-Fascist Intellectuals, which was published in 1925. Other notable Italian liberal anti-fascists around that time were Piero Gobetti and Carlo Rosselli.

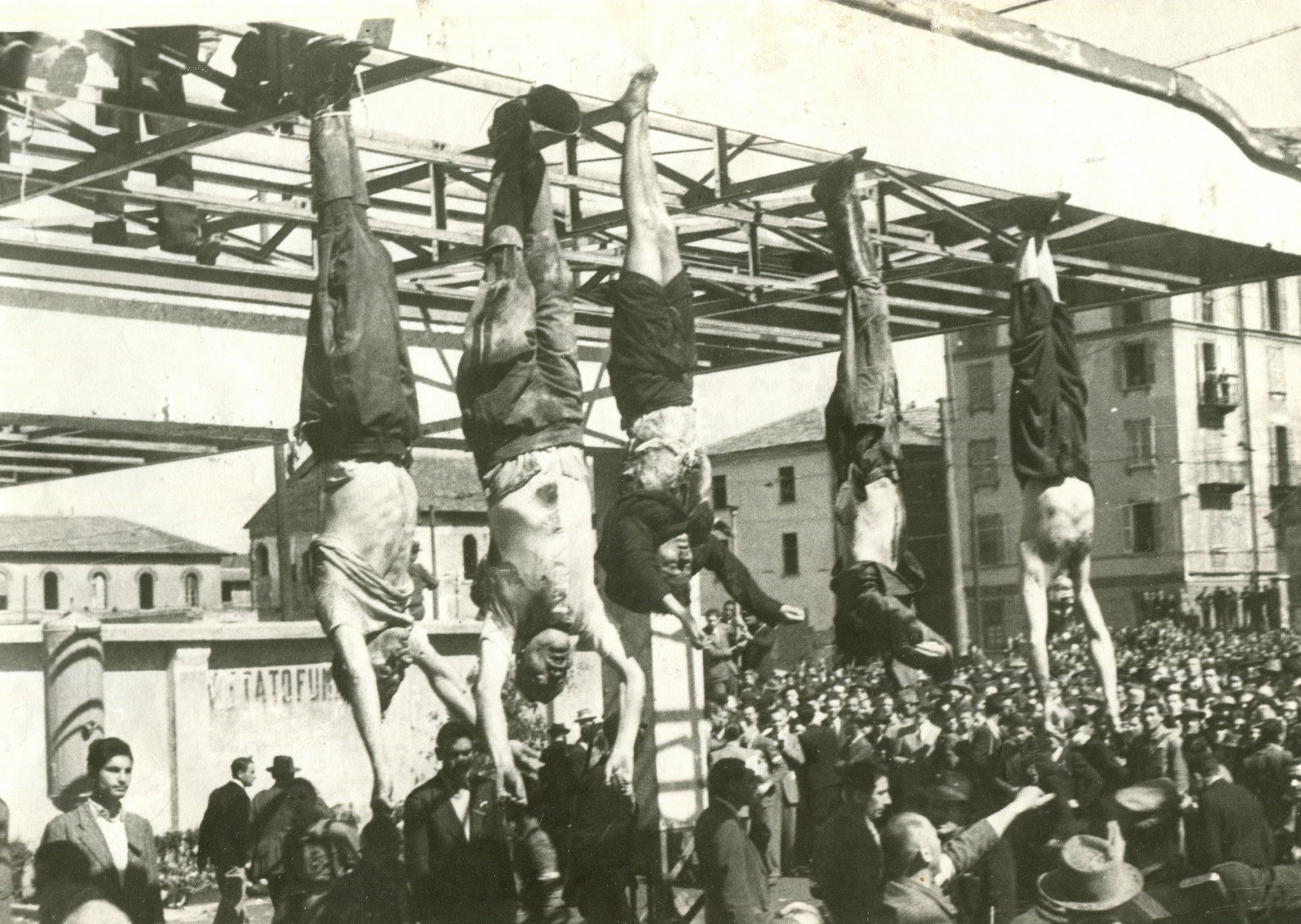
The dead body of Benito Mussolini, Claretta Petacci and other executed fascists on display in Milan

Concentrazione Antifascista Italiana (English: Italian Anti-Fascist Concentration), officially known as Concentrazione d'Azione Antifascista (Anti-Fascist Action Concentration), was an Italian coalition of Anti-Fascist groups which existed from 1927 to 1934, trying to promote and to coordinate expatriate actions to fight fascism in Italy; they published a propaganda paper entitled La Libertà. Giustizia e Libertà (English: Justice and Freedom) was an Italian anti-fascist resistance movement, active from 1929 to 1945 which shared a belief in active, effective opposition to fascism, compared to the older Italian anti-fascist parties. Giustizia e Libertà also made the international community aware of the realities of fascism in Italy, thanks to the work of Gaetano Salvemini.

Between 1920 and 1943, several anti-fascist movements were active among the Slovenes and Croats in the territories annexed to Italy after World War I, known as the Julian March. The most influential was the militant insurgent organization TIGR, which carried out numerous sabotages, as well as attacks on representatives of the Fascist Party and the military. Most of the underground structure of the organization was discovered and dismantled by the OVRA in 1940 and 1941, and after June 1941 most of its former activists joined the Slovene Partisans. Many members of the Italian resistance left their homes and went to live in the mountains, fighting against Italian fascists and German Nazi soldiers during the Italian Civil War. Many cities in Italy, including Turin, Naples and Milan, were freed by anti-fascist uprisings.

== Republican era (1946–present) ==
=== Birth of the Republic ===
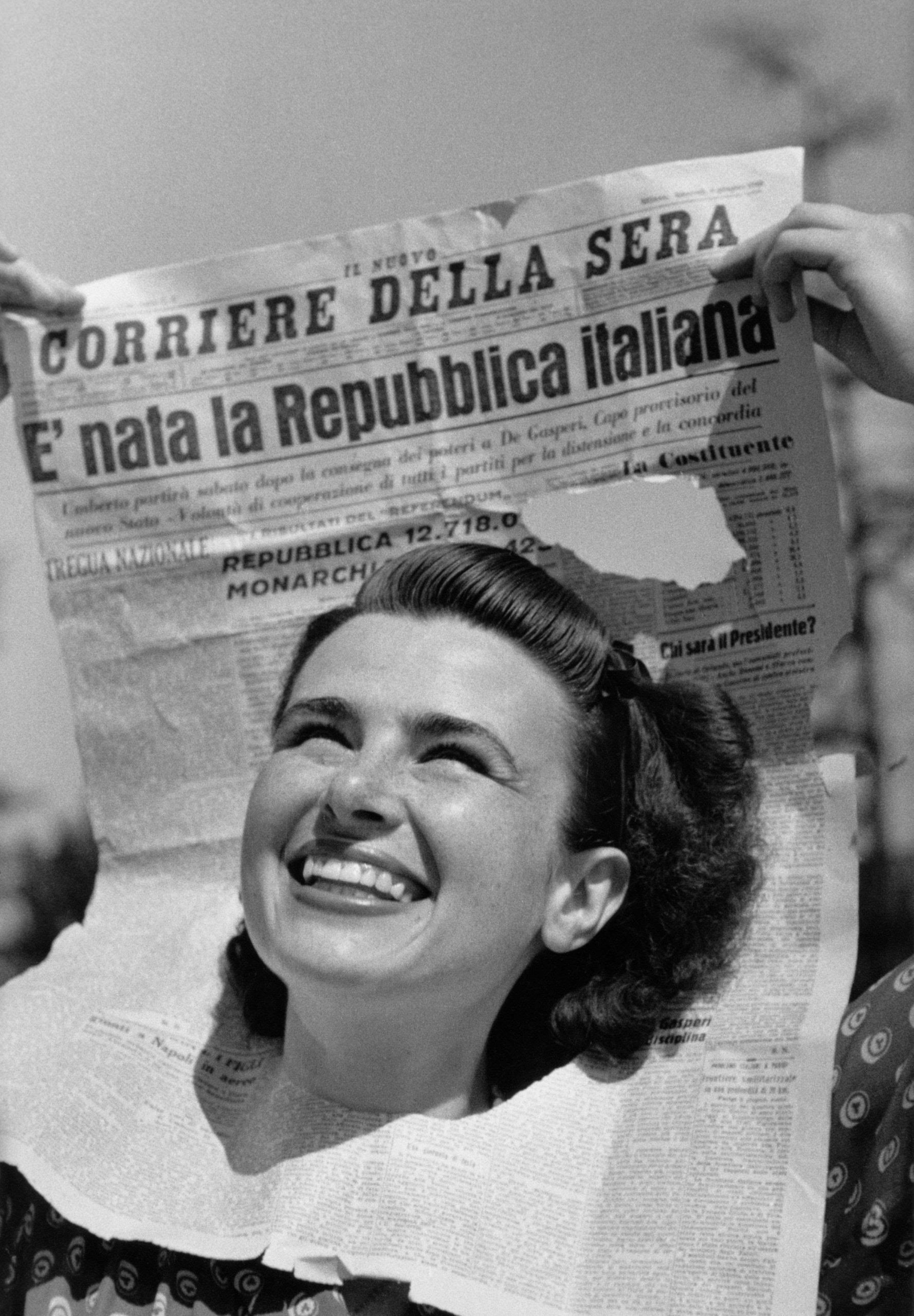
The symbolic photo of the birth of the Republic, which portrays the face of a young woman emerging from a copy of Il Corriere della Sera of 6 June 1946 with the title «È nata la Repubblica Italiana» ("The Italian Republic is born").

The aftermath of World War II left Italy with a destroyed economy, a divided society, and anger against the monarchy for its endorsement of the Fascist regime. These frustrations contributed to a revival of the Italian republican movement. Umberto II was pressured by the threat of another civil war to call the 1946 Italian institutional referendum to decide whether Italy should remain a monarchy or become a republic. On 2 June 1946, the republican side won 54% of the vote and Italy officially became a republic.

Under the Treaty of Peace with Italy, 1947, Istria, Kvarner, most of the Julian March as well as the Dalmatian city of Zara was annexed by Yugoslavia causing the Istrian-Dalmatian exodus, which led to the emigration of between 230,000 and 350,000 local ethnic Italians (Istrian Italians and Dalmatian Italians), the others being ethnic Slovenians, ethnic Croatians, and ethnic Istro-Romanians, choosing to maintain Italian citizenship. Later, the Free Territory of Trieste was divided between the two states. Italy also lost all of its colonial possessions, formally ending the Italian Empire. In 1950, Italian Somaliland was made a United Nations Trust Territory under Italian administration until 1 July 1960. The Italian border that applies today has existed since 1975, when Trieste was formally re-annexed to Italy.

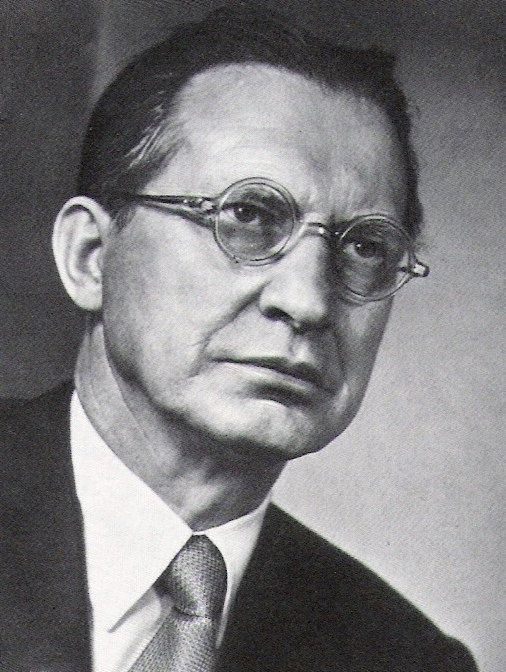
Alcide De Gasperi, first republican Prime Minister of Italy and one of the Founding Fathers of the European Union

The General Elections of 1946, held at the same time as the Constitutional Referendum, elected 556 members of a Constituent Assembly. A new constitution was approved, setting up a parliamentary democracy. In 1947, under American pressure, the communists were expelled from the government. The Italian general election, 1948 saw a landslide victory for Christian Democrats, that dominated the system for the following forty years.

Italy joined the Marshall Plan (ERP) and NATO. By 1950, the economy had largely stabilized and started booming. In 1957, Italy was a founding member of the European Economic Community, which later transformed into the European Union (EU). The Marshall Plan's long-term legacy was to help modernize Italy's economy. By 1953, industrial production had doubled compared with 1938 and the annual rate of productivity increase was 6.4%, twice the British rate.

=== Economic miracle ===
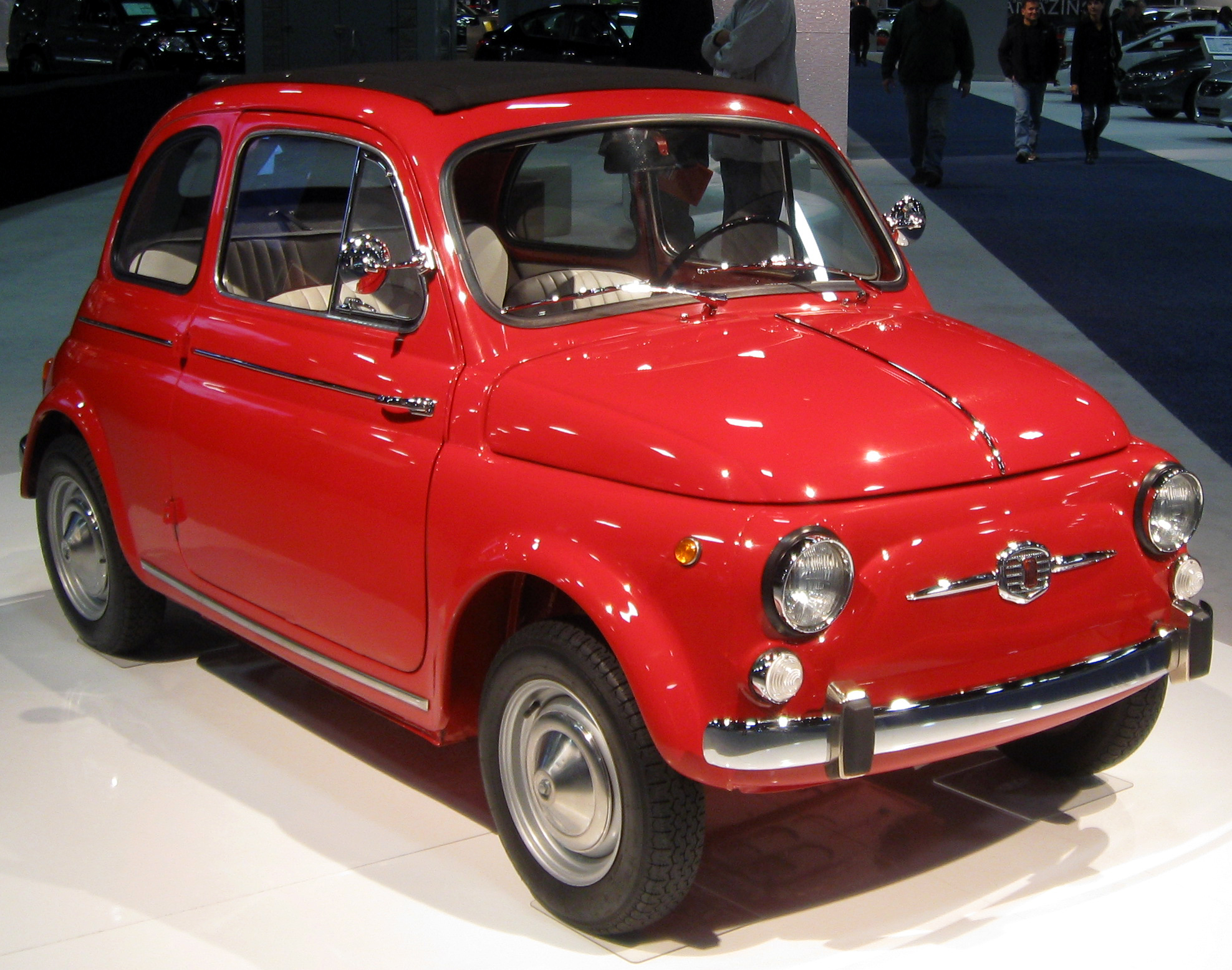
The Fiat 500, launched in 1957, is considered a symbol of Italy's economic miracle.

In the 1950s and 1960s, the country enjoyed a prolonged economic boom, which was accompanied by a dramatic rise in the standard of living of ordinary Italians. The so-called Italian economic miracle lasted almost uninterruptedly until the "Hot Autumn's" massive strikes and social unrest of 1969–70, that combined with the later 1973 oil crisis, gradually cooled the economy. It has been calculated that the Italian economy experienced an average rate of growth of GDP of 5.8% per year between 1951 and 1963, and 5.0% per year between 1964 and 1973. Between 1955 and 1971, around 9 million people are estimated to have been involved in inter-regional migrations in Italy, uprooting entire communities. Emigration was especially directed to the factories of the so-called "industrial triangle", a region encompassed between the major manufacturing centres of Milan and Turin and the seaport of Genoa.

The needs of a modernizing economy demanded new transport and energy infrastructures. Thousands of kilometres of railways and highways were completed in record times to connect the main urban areas, while dams and power plants were built all over Italy, often without regard for geological and environmental conditions. Strong urban growth led to uncontrolled urban sprawl. The natural environment was constantly under threat by wild industrial expansion, leading to ecological disasters like the Vajont Dam inundation and the Seveso chemical accident.

=== Years of Lead ===
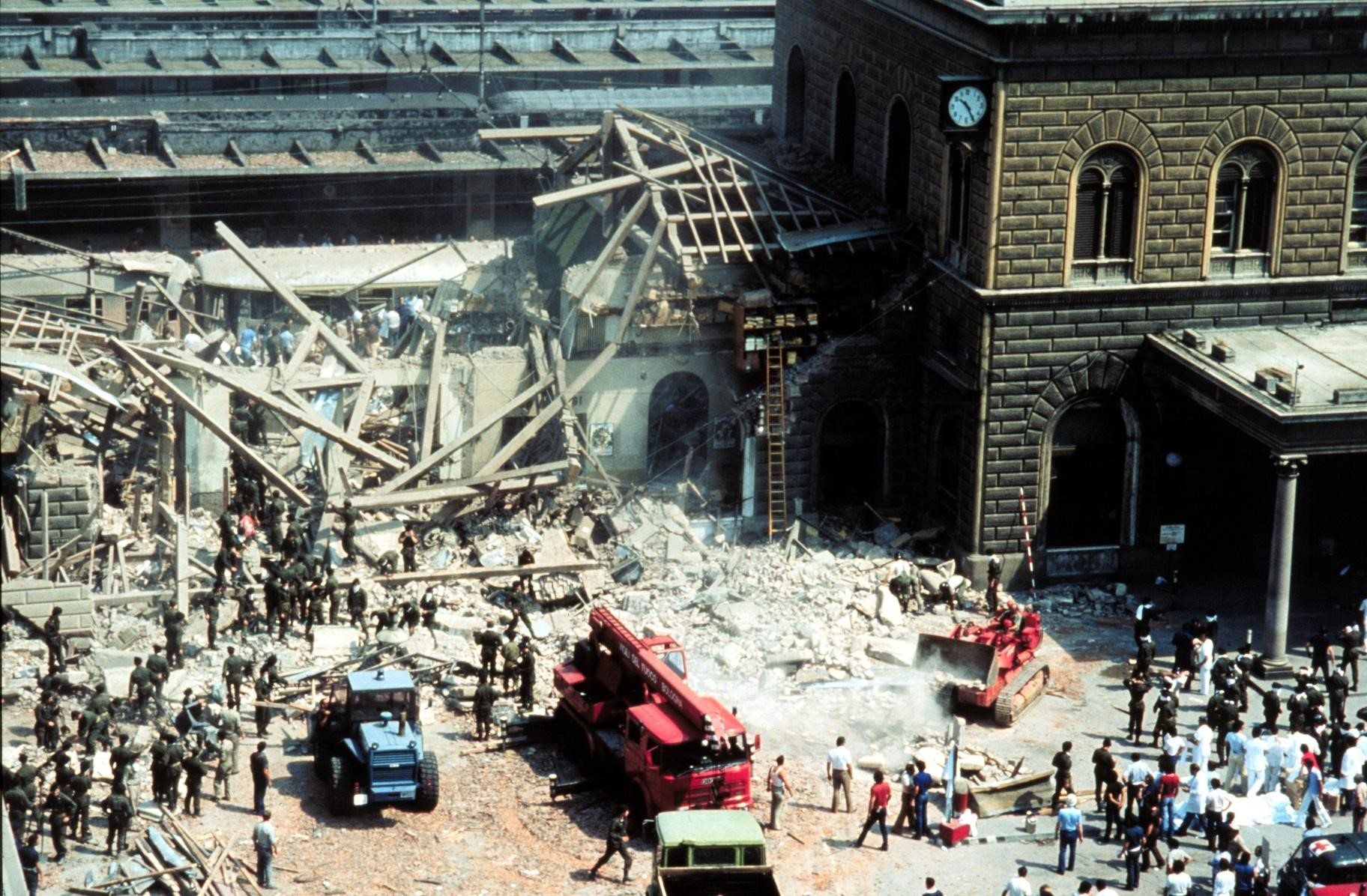
Attack of the far-right terrorist group NAR at the Bologna railway station on 2 August 1980, which caused the death of 85 people

During the 1970s, Italy saw an unexpected escalation of political violence. From 1969 to 1980, repeated neofascist outrages were launched such as the Piazza Fontana bombing in 1969. Red Brigades and many other groups decided on armed attacks as a revolutionary strategy. They carried out urban riots, as in Rome and Bologna in 1977. Known as the Years of Lead, this period was characterised by widespread social conflicts and terrorist acts carried out by extra-parliamentary movements. The assassination of the leader of the Christian Democracy (DC), Aldo Moro, led to the end of a "historic compromise" between the DC and the Communist Party (PCI). In the 1980s, for the first time, two governments were managed by a Republican (Giovanni Spadolini 1981–82) and a Socialist (Bettino Craxi 1983–87) rather than by a Christian Democrat.

At the end of the Lead years, the PCI gradually increased their votes thanks to Enrico Berlinguer. The Socialist Party (PSI), led by Bettino Craxi, became more and more critical of the Communists and of the Soviet Union; Craxi himself pushed in favour of US President Ronald Reagan's positioning of Pershing II missiles in Italy.

=== Second Republic (1992–present) ===
Italy faced several terror attacks between 1992 and 1993, perpetrated by the Sicilian Mafia as a consequence of several life sentences pronounced during the "Maxi Trial", and of the new anti-mafia measures launched by the government. In 1992, two major dynamite attacks killed the judges Falcone and Borsellino, and a year later tourist spots, leaving 10 dead and 93 injured and causing severe damage to cultural heritage such as the Uffizi Gallery. In May 1993, pope Johan Paul II condemned the Mafia. At the end of a Mass, he exclaimed: "Mafiosi, repent! The Day of Judgment will come, when you will have to answer for your misdeeds.” On 28 July 1993, the Mafia set off a car bomb in front of the Archbasilica of Saint John Lateran and another one in front of the Church of San Giorgio in Velabro, both in Rome. An anti-Mafia priest was shot dead in Rome.

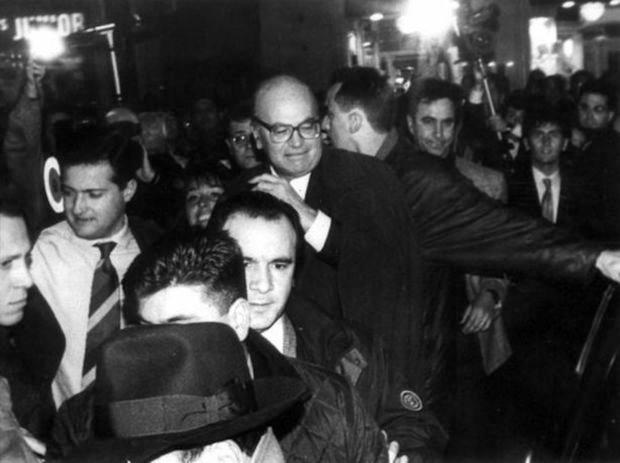
Bettino Craxi, viewed by many as the symbol of Tangentopoli, Leader of the Socialist Party and Prime Minister from 1983 to 1987, is greeted by a salvo of coins as a sign of loathing by protesters.

From 1992 to 1997, Italy faced significant challenges as voters disenchanted with political paralysis, massive government debt, extensive corruption, and organised crime's considerable influence collectively called the political system Tangentopoli. As Tangentopoli was under a set of judicial investigations by the name of Mani pulite (Italian for "clean hands"), voters demanded political, economic, and ethical reforms. Between 1992 and 1994 the DC underwent a severe crisis and was dissolved, splitting up into several pieces. The PSI (along with other minor governing parties) completely dissolved.

In March 1994, a general election also swept media magnate Silvio Berlusconi (Leader of "Pole of Freedoms" coalition) into office as prime minister. Berlusconi was forced to step down in December 1994 when his Lega Nord partners withdrew support. The First Berlusconi government was succeeded by a technical government headed by Lamberto Dini. At the 1996 general election, Romano Prodi led a centre-left coalition to victory. He narrowly lost a vote of confidence in October 1998. Democrats of the Left leader Massimo D'Alema formed his [[Thumbnail for First D'Alema government First D'Alema government|first government]], but in April 2000, following poor performance by his coalition in regional elections, he resigned.

The succeeding centre-left government was headed by Giuliano Amato. That same year, a centre-right coalition formed the government and Silvio Berlusconi was able to regain power and keep it for a complete five-year mandate. Berlusconi participated in the US-led multinational coalition in Iraq (→ Iraq War).

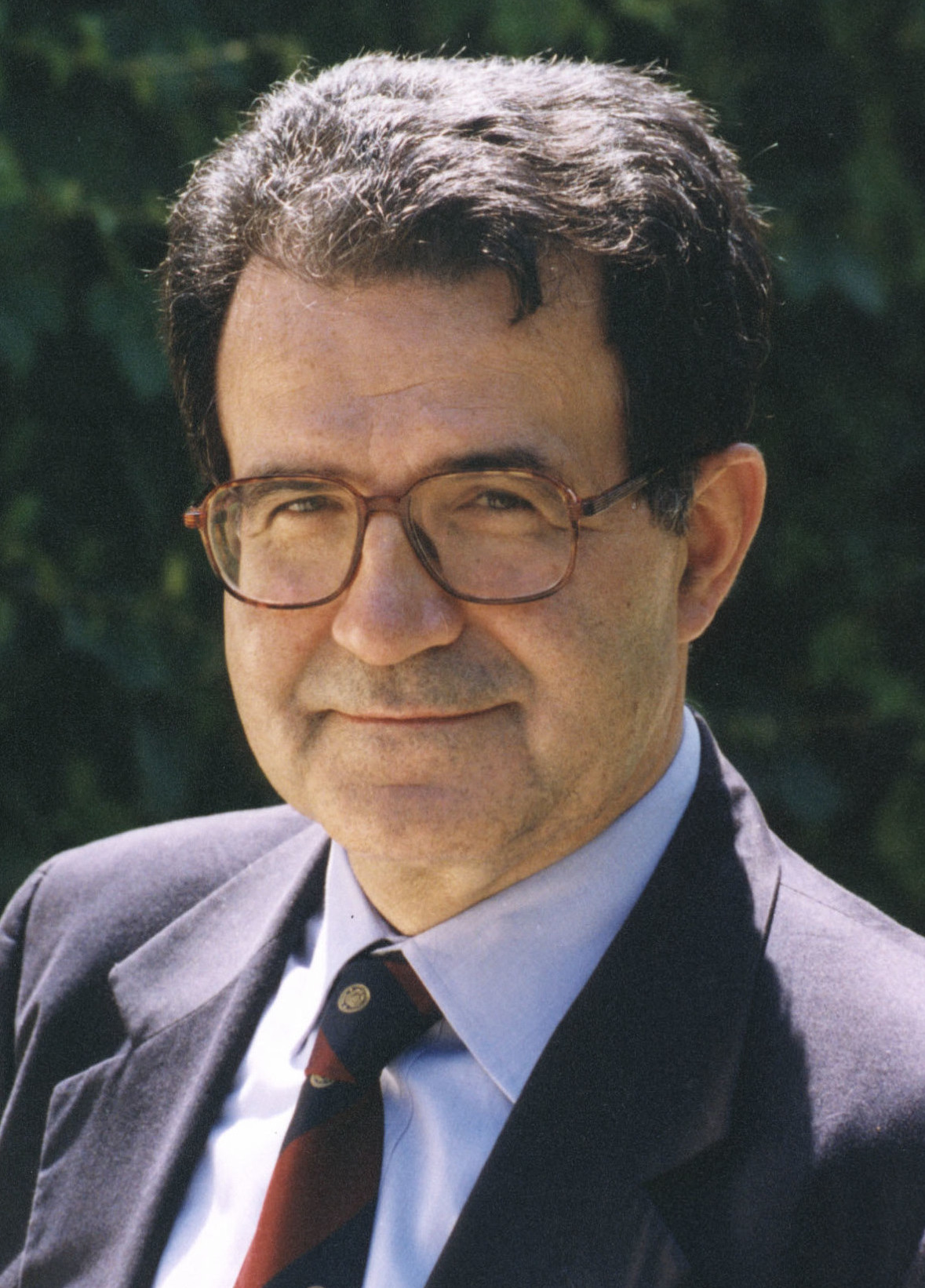
Romano Prodi, Prime Minister from 1996 to 1998 and from 2006 to 2008, and long-time leader of the centre-left coalition

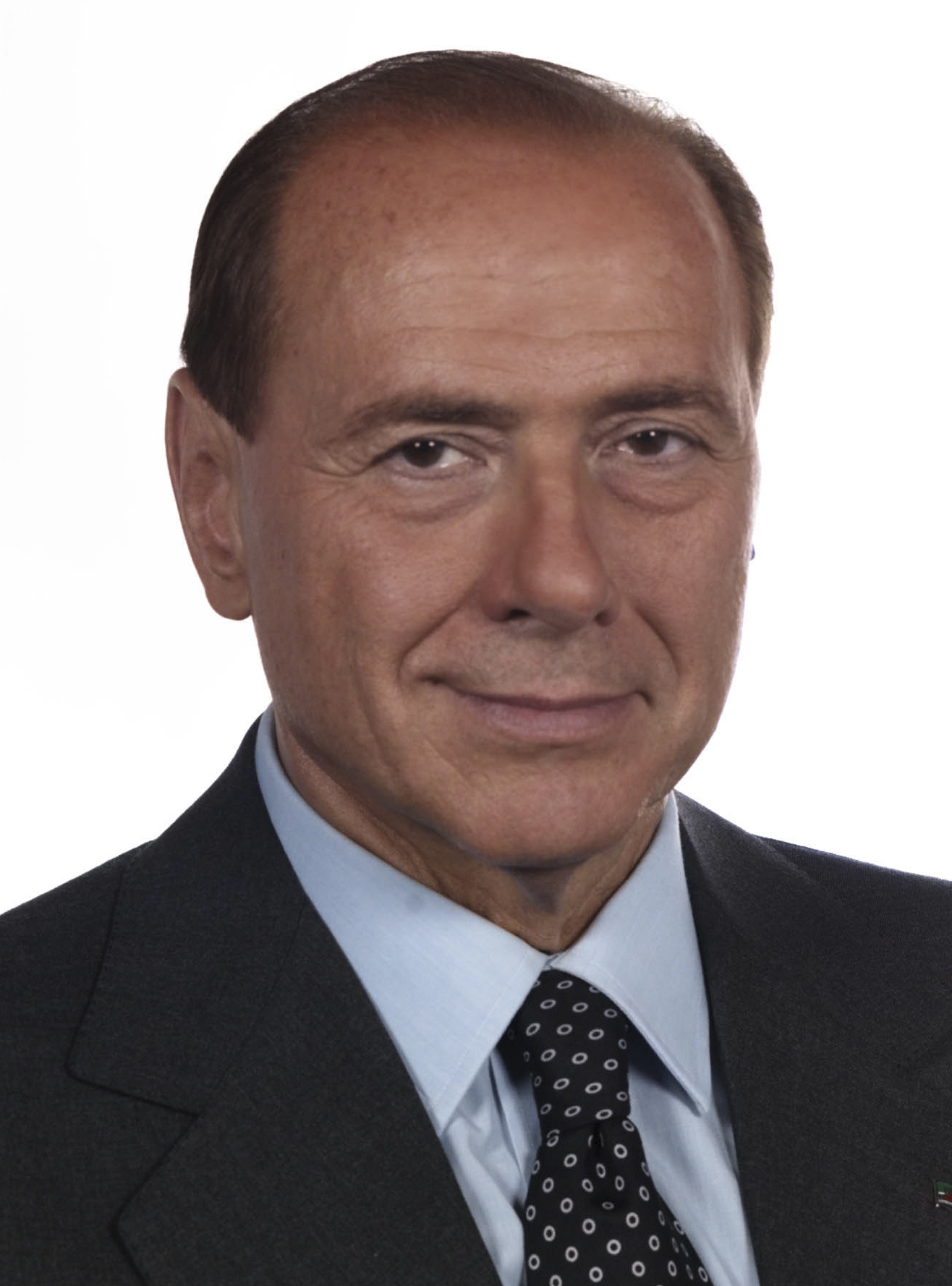
Silvio Berlusconi, Prime Minister from 1994 to 1995, from 2001 to 2006 and from 2008 to 2011, and long-time leader of the centre-right coalition

The 2006 general election returned Prodi to government, leading a coalition of 11 parties (The Union). Prodi followed a cautious policy of economic liberalisation and reduction of public debt. Berlusconi won the 2008 general election. Italy was among the countries hit hardest by the Great Recession of 2008–09 and the subsequent European debt crisis. The national economy shrunk by 6.76% over seven quarters of recession. On 12 November 2011, Berlusconi resigned, and the economist Mario Monti was sworn in as prime minister at the head of a technocratic government. To avoid the debt crisis and kick-start economic growth, Monti's national unity government launched a massive programme of austerity measures; that reduced the deficit but precipitated a double-dip recession in 2012 and 2013.

On 24 and 25 February 2013, a general election was held; a centre-left coalition led by Pier Luigi Bersani, Leader of the Democratic Party, won a slight majority in the Chamber of Deputies but did not control the Senate. On 24 April, President Napolitano gave to the Vice-Secretary of the Democratic Party, Enrico Letta, the task of forming a government. Letta formed a short-lived grand coalition government (Letta government) which lasted until 22 February 2014. Matteo Renzi formed a new government with the support of some centrist parties. The government implemented numerous reforms, including changes to the electoral system, a relaxation of labour and employment laws with the intention of boosting economic growth, a thorough reformation of the public administration and the introduction of same-sex civil unions. Renzi resigned after losing a constitutional referendum in December 2016, and was succeeded by Paolo Gentiloni. The centre-left Cabinets were plagued by the aftermath of the European debt crisis and the European migrant crisis, which fuelled support for populist and right-wing parties. In 2015, the European migrant crisis began.

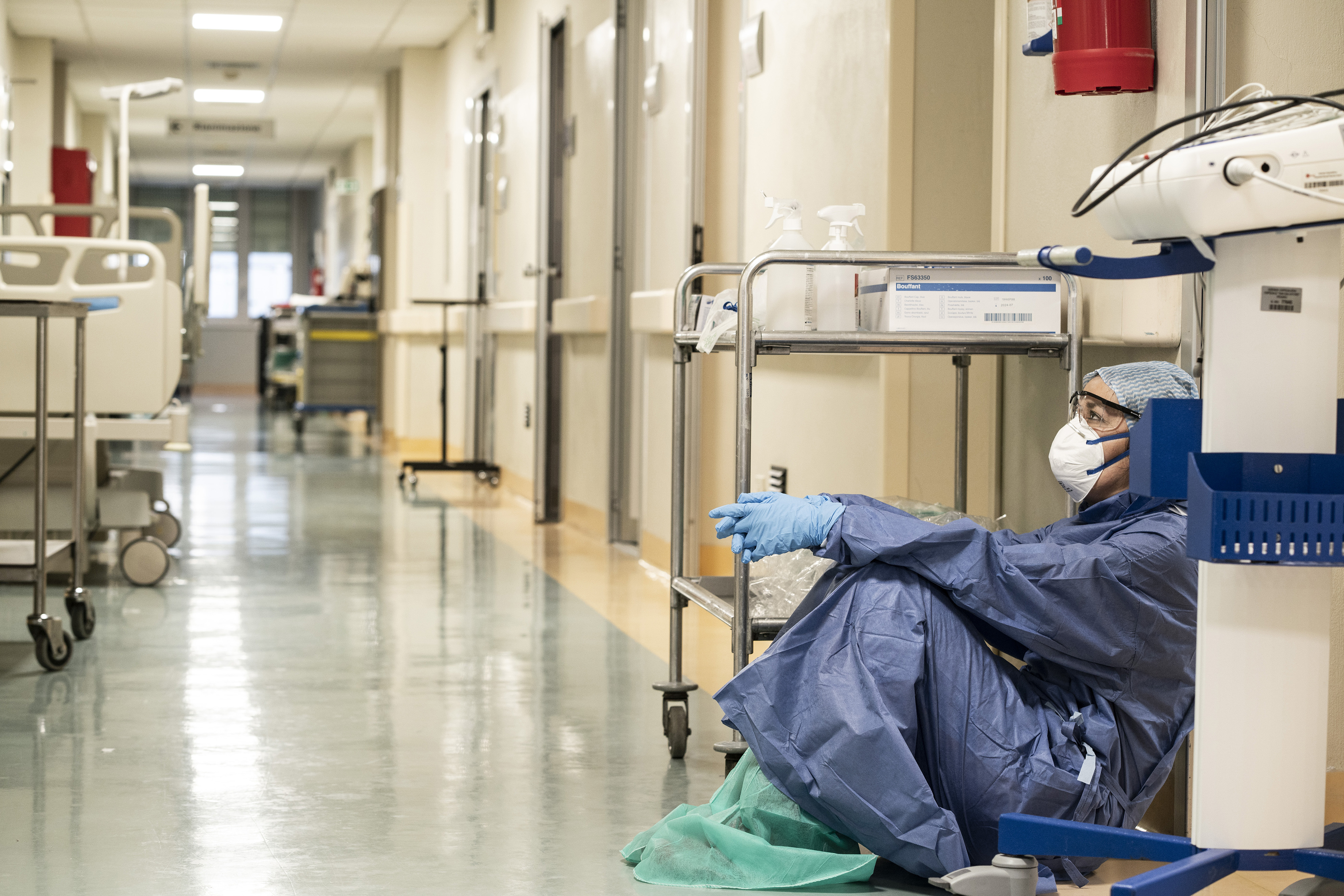
Exhausted nurse takes a break in an Italian hospital during the COVID-19 emergency.

The 2018 general election resulted in a hung parliament once again, which led to an unlikely populist government led by Giuseppe Conte. After fourteen months, the League withdrew its support and Conte allied with the Democratic Party and other smaller left-wing parties to form a new Cabinet. In 2020, Italy was severely hit by the COVID-19 pandemic. From March to May 2020, Conte's government imposed a national lockdown. The measures, despite being widely approved by public opinion, were also described as the largest suppression of constitutional rights in the history of the republic. With more than 100,000 confirmed fatalities, Italy had one of the highest total number of deaths in the coronavirus pandemic. The pandemic caused also a severe economic disruption. In February 2021, these extraordinary circumstances resulted in the formation of a national coalition government led by former president of the European Central Bank Mario Draghi. In January 2022, President Sergio Mattarella was re-elected.

On 21 July 2022, following a government crisis, Draghi resigned. A snap election resulted in the centre-right coalition gaining an absolute majority.
On 22 October 2022, Giorgia Meloni was sworn in as Italy's first female prime minister.

== See also ==
- Duchy of Urbino
- Genetic history of Italy
- History of Capri
- History of Naples
- History of Rome
- History of Sardinia
- History of Sicily
- History of the Republic of Venice
- History of Trentino
- History of Tuscany
- History of Verona
- Kingdom of Lombardy–Venetia
- List of historical societies in Italy
- List of consorts of Montferrat
- List of consorts of Naples
- List of consorts of Savoy
- List of consorts of the Kingdom of the Two Sicilies
- List of consorts of Tuscany
- List of Italian queens
- List of Italian inventions and discoveries
- List of kings of the Lombards
- List of Milanese consorts
- List of Modenese consorts
- List of monarchs of Naples
- List of monarchs of Sardinia
- List of monarchs of Sicily
- List of monarchs of the Kingdom of the Two Sicilies
- List of Parmese consorts
- List of presidents of Italy
- List of prime ministers of Italy
- List of queens of the Lombards
- List of Roman and Byzantine Empresses
- List of grand dukes of Tuscany
- List of Sardinian consorts
- List of Sicilian consorts
- List of State Archives of Italy
- List of viceroys of Naples
- List of viceroys of Sicily
- Milan
- Military history of Italy
- Politics of Italy
