= 1891 in Italy =

- Decades: 1870s; 1880s; 1890s; 1900s; 1910s
- See also: History of Italy; Timeline of Italian history; List of years in Italy

Events from the year 1891 in Italy.

== Kingdom of Italy ==
- Monarch – Umberto I (1878–1900)
- Prime Minister –
  1. Francesco Crispi (1887–1891)
  2. Antonio Di Rudinì (1891–1892)

== Events ==
=== January ===
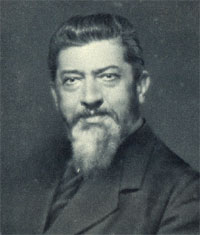
Filippo Turati

- January 1 – In Genoa the first Camera del Lavoro (Chamber of Labour) is founded, following the example of the Bourse du Travail in Paris.
- January 15 – Foundation of Critica Sociale by Filippo Turati and Anna Kuliscioff, the most influential Marxist review in Italy from 1891 to 1898, tackling all the serious public problems of 1890s: banking scandals, repression of the Fasci Siciliani unrest, the colonial war in Africa, and food riots.
- January 31 – The administration of Prime Minister Francesco Crispi resigns after a fierce disagreement with the Historical Right about the budget.

=== February ===
- February 6 – Crispi is succeeded by Antonio di Rudinì forming a coalition cabinet with a part of the Left under Giovanni Nicotera. His Minister of Finance Luigi Luzzatti imprudently abolished the system of frequent clearings of banknotes between banks, a measure which facilitated the duplication of part of the paper currency and hastened the bank crisis of 1893 and the resulting Banca Romana scandal.

=== March ===
- March 24 – Two secret Anglo-Italian protocols in 1891, left most of Ethiopia in Italy's sphere of influence.

=== April ===
- April 20 – Critica Sociale publishes the programme of Milan's Socialist League, which aims to establish a socialist party.

=== May ===
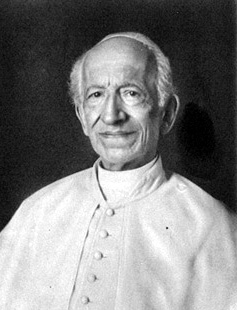
Pope Leo XIII

- May 1 – The first official Fascio dei Lavoratori was founded on Labour Day in Catania by Giuseppe de Felice Giuffrida. In Rome a rally organized by socialists and anarchists to celebrate the May 1 (International Workers' Day) claim of an eight-hour workday ends with a wave of arrests.
- May 6 – The Treaty of the Triple Alliance is renewed including the amendments made in two additional treaties of 1887, to Italy's aspirations in the Mediterranean and territorial compensation for Italy in case of Austrian expansion in the Balkans.
- May 15 – Pope Leo XIII issued the Rerum novarum encyclical addressing the condition of the working classes and outlining the rights of workers to a fair wage, safe working conditions, and the formation of trade unions, while affirming the rights to property and free enterprise, opposing both socialism and laissez-faire capitalism.
- May 29 – In the Italian Chamber of Deputies, Giovanni Bovio proposes the abandonment of the African expansion policy, but his proposal, supported only by the Extreme Left, is rejected on 6 June.

=== October ===
- October 27 – The Nicotera Regulation, by interior minister Giovanni Nicotera, made prostitution in Italy fully legal in private houses, with strict regulations. A system of sifilicomi (hospitals for sex workers) was also set up, under the belief that they were the main sources of spreading venereal diseases. Although prostitutes found this regulated system oppressive, they developed ways to resist it.

== Births ==
- January 1 – Alessandro De Stefani, Italian screenwriter (died 1970)
- January 2 – Giovanni Michelucci, Italian architect, urban planner and engraver (died 1990)
- January 21 – Aldo Silvani, Italian film actor (died 1964)
- January 22 – Antonio Gramsci, Italian writer, politician, political philosopher, and one of the most important Marxist thinkers in the 20th century (died 1937)
- January 30 – Francesco Pricolo, Italian aviator (died 1980)
- February 2 – Antonio Segni, Italian Christian Democratic politician and President of the Italian Republic from 1962–1964 (died 1972)
- February 5 – Renato Petronio, Italian rower (died 1976)
- February 9 – Pietro Nenni, Italian socialist politician and national secretary of the Italian Socialist Party (PSI) (died 1980)
- February 15 – Dino Borgioli, Italian lyric tenor (died 1960)
- February 16 – Pietro Parente, Italian theologian, cardinal, and inquisitor in the Holy Office of the Roman Catholic Church (died 1986)
- March 16 – Alfonsina Strada, Italian cyclist, the only woman to have ridden the Giro d'Italia in 1924 when the organisers mistook her for a man (died 1959)
- March 31 – Bruno Fattori, Italian poet (died 1985)
- April 4 – Giani Stuparich, Italian author (died 1961)
- April 19 – Riccardo Bacchelli, Italian writer (died 1985)
- April 20 – Aldo Finzi, Jewish-Italian Fascist politician, executed in the Ardeatine massacre (died 1944)
- April 26 – Alberto Gianni, Italian underwater diver (died 1930)
- May 26 – Enrico Del Debbio, Italian architect (died 1973)
- June 20 - Giannina Arangi-Lombardi, Italian operatic soprano (died 1951)
- June 21 – Pier Luigi Nervi, Italian engineer and architect (died 1979)
- July 13 – Franco Casavola, Italian Futurist composer and theorist (died 1955)
- July 19 – Luigi Cimara, Italian film actor (died 1962)
- August 14 – Giuseppe Fioravanzo, Italian admiral (died 1975)
- August 29 – Mario Berlinguer, Italian lawyer and politician (died 1969)
- September 1 – Ferdinando Innocenti, founder of the Innocenti company and the creator of the Lambretta motorscooter (died 1966)
- September 2 – Maria Capuana, Italian mezzo-soprano (died 1955)
- November 10 – Enrica Calabresi, Italian zoologist, herpetologist, and entomologist (died 1944)
- November 18 – Gio Ponti, Italian architect and industrial designer (died 1979)
- November 27 – Giovanni Breviario, Italian opera tenor (died 1982)
- December 7 – Alessandro Zenatello, Italian painter (died 1977)

== Deaths ==
- January 1 – Antonio Stoppani, Italian geologist and palaeontologist (born 1824)
- January 30 – Carlo Cristofori, Italian Cardinal of the Roman Catholic Church (born 1813)
- February 1 – Corradino D'Ascanio, Italian aeronautical engineer (died 1981)
- February 8 – Antonio Brilla, Italian sculptor and ceramic artist (born 1813)
- February 18 – Ferdinando Acton, Italian naval officer, admiral, politician and Minister for the Navy (born 1832)
- February 22 – Agostino Magliani, Italian financier and Minister of Finance (born 1824)
- February 28 – Giovanni Morelli, Italian art critic and political figure (born 1816)
- March 25 – Stefano Jacini, Italian statesman and economist (born 1826)
- May 17 – Ignazio Florio Sr. Italian entrepreneur and politician, member of the rich Florio economic dynasty, one of the wealthiest Italian families during the late 19th century (born 1838)
- May 29 – Giulio Litta, Italian composer (born 1822)
- June 8 – Carlo Maria Curci, Italian theologian (born 1810)
- June 8 – Giovanni Caselli, Italian physicist and inventor of the pantelegraph (born 1815)
- July 3 – Stefano Golinelli, Italian piano virtuoso and composer (born 1818)
- July 21 – Franco Faccio, Italian composer and conductor (born 1840)
- August 15 – Pietro Rosa, Italian architect and topographer (born 1810)
- November 11 – Raffaele Ferlotti, Italian opera baritone (born 1819)
- November 14 – Antonio Beretta, Italian politician and Milan's first mayor (born 1808)
- November 28 – Ferdinando Palasciano, Italian physician and politician (born 1815)
- December 17 – Amos Cassioli, Italian painter (born 1832)

== Sources ==
- Gibson, Mary (1986). Prostitution and the State in Italy, 1860-1915. New Brunswick: Rutgers University Press. ISBN 0-8135-1172-0.
