= 1886 in Italy =

- Decades: 1860s; 1870s; 1880s; 1890s; 1900s
- See also: History of Italy; Timeline of Italian history; List of years in Italy

Events from the year 1886 in Italy

== Kingdom of Italy ==
- Monarch – Umberto I (1878–1900)
- Prime Minister – Agostino Depretis (1881–1887)

The total population of Italy in 1886 (within the current borders) was 30.776 million. Life expectancy in 1886 was 35.1 years.

== Events ==
Italy continues to suffer from the cholera outbreak in 1884. According to official estimates, cholera killed 50,000 Italians between 1884 and 1887. The course of the disease led to a slide into a state of near anarchy in Sicily in 1885 and 1886 as fear of infection engulfed the island and the people of towns and villages desperately set up makeshift sanitary cordons in defiance of the authorities.

=== February ===
- 11 February — The Berti Law, named after Domenico Berti, Minister of Education in the Depretis V government (or officially: Law no. 3657), set the minimum age for admission to work in quarries, mines, and factories, at nine years, the minimum age for night work at twelve years and indicated a maximum of eight hours' work for them. However, the provisions in the law were not actually enforced until the Carcano Law was issued in 1902, thanks to which – for the first time – action was taken to support the protection of underage workers.

=== May ===
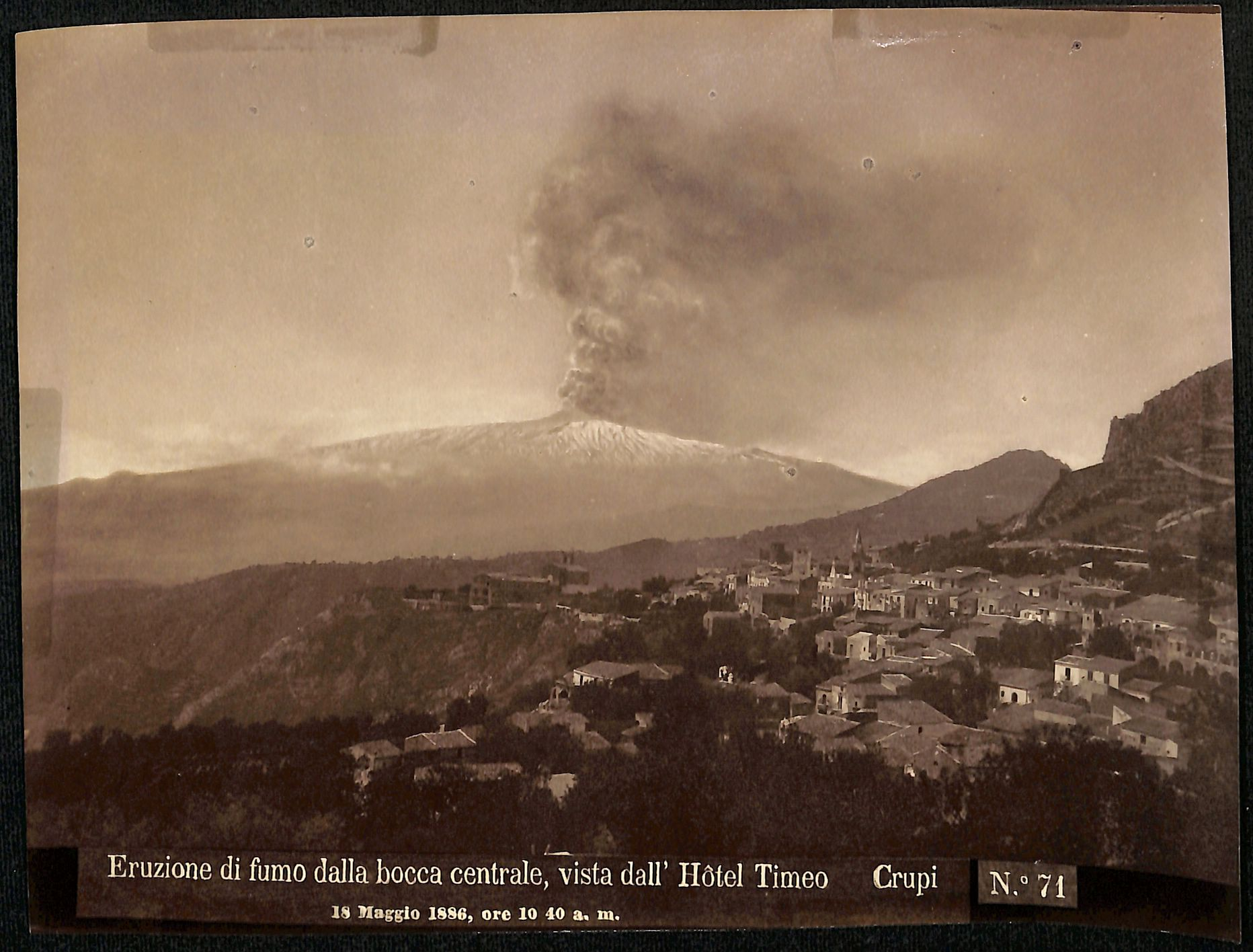
Smoke eruption from the central mouth of the Etna on 18 May 1886

- 18 May — Eruption on the southern flank of the Mount Etna volcano on Sicily, following a powerful summit explosion. The eruption builds a row of pyroclastic cones, the largest of which is named Monte Gemmellaro (in honour to the Gemmellaro family of volcanologists from Catania who studied Etna in the 19th century). A lava stream comes very close to Nicolosi. Eruptions continue to 7 June 1886.
- 23 May — First round of the 1886 Italian general election with a second round of voting on 30 May. The "ministerial" Historical Left led by Prime Minister Depretis emerged as the largest in Parliament, winning 292 of the 508 seats.

=== June ===
- 7 June — Palermo Centrale railway station, the main railway station of Palermo, capital of Sicily, is opened.

== Births ==
- January 7 – Amedeo Maiuri, archaeologist (d. 1963)
- 10 February — Pia Maria Nalli, mathematician, also remembered for her struggles against discrimination against women in the Italian university hiring system (d. 1964)
- 2 March — Vittorio Pozzo, football player, manager and journalist, who led the Italy national team to victory in the 1934 and 1938 FIFA World Cup (d. 1968)
- 11 March — Luigi Salvatorelli, historian and publicist (d. 1974)
- 6 May — Giuseppe Pietri, composer, known primarily for his work in operetta (d. 1946)
- 8 May — Edvige Maria Valcarenghi, later known as Bice Waleran or Valerian, film actress of the silent era (d. 1969)
- 4 June — Eugenio Bava, film cinematographer (d. 1966)
- July 3 — Giovanni Battista Caproni, aeronautical, civil, and electrical engineer, aircraft designer, and industrialist (d. 1957)
- 28 July — Domenico Marotta, chemist and scientist, serving as the director of the National Institute of Health (ISS) from 1935 to 1961 (d. 1974)

== Deaths ==
- 16 January — Amilcare Ponchielli, opera composer (b. 1834)
- 25 January — Michelangelo Fumagalli, painter (b. 1812)
- 16 February — Cesare Uva, landscape painter (b. 1824)
- 10 April — Agostino Bertani, revolutionary and physician during Italian unification (b. 1812)
- 11 November — Luigi Bisi, architect and painter (b. 1814)
- 10 December — Marco Minghetti, economist and statesman (b. 1818)

== Sources ==
- Snowden, Frank M. (1995). Naples in the time of cholera, 1884-1911. Cambridge: Cambridge University Press. ISBN 978-0-585-13106-1.
