= 1892 in Italy =

- Decades: 1870s; 1880s; 1890s; 1900s; 1910s
- See also: History of Italy; Timeline of Italian history; List of years in Italy

Events from the year 1892 in Italy.

== Kingdom of Italy ==
- Monarch – Umberto I (1878–1900)
- Prime Minister –
  1. Antonio Di Rudinì (1891–1892)
  2. Giovanni Giolitti (1892–1893)

== Events ==
=== March ===
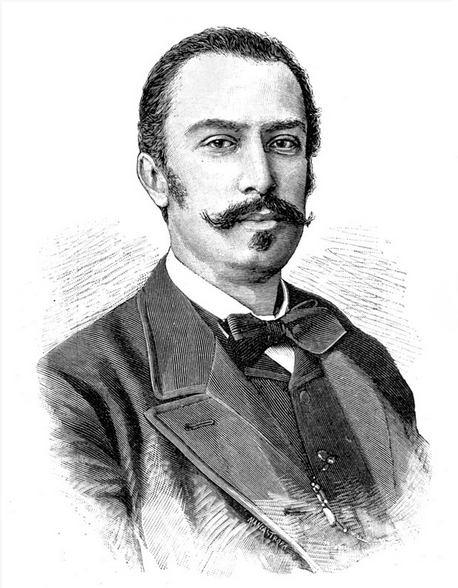
Prime Minister Giovanni Giolitti during the first years of his political career.

- March 16 – Founding of the newspaper Il Mattino in Naples by Edoardo Scarfoglio and Matilde Serao.

=== May ===
- May 15 – The new government headed by Giovanni Giolitti takes office after Antonio Di Rudinì lost the vote in the Italian Chamber of Deputies, because his financial policy is opposed on both the right and the left.

=== June ===
- June 26 – Battle of Serobeti between Italy and Mahdist Sudan.
- June 29 – Founding of the section of the Fascio dei lavoratori (Workers League), a popular movement of democratic and socialist inspiration, in Palermo (Sicily) by Rosario Garibaldi Bosco.

=== July ===
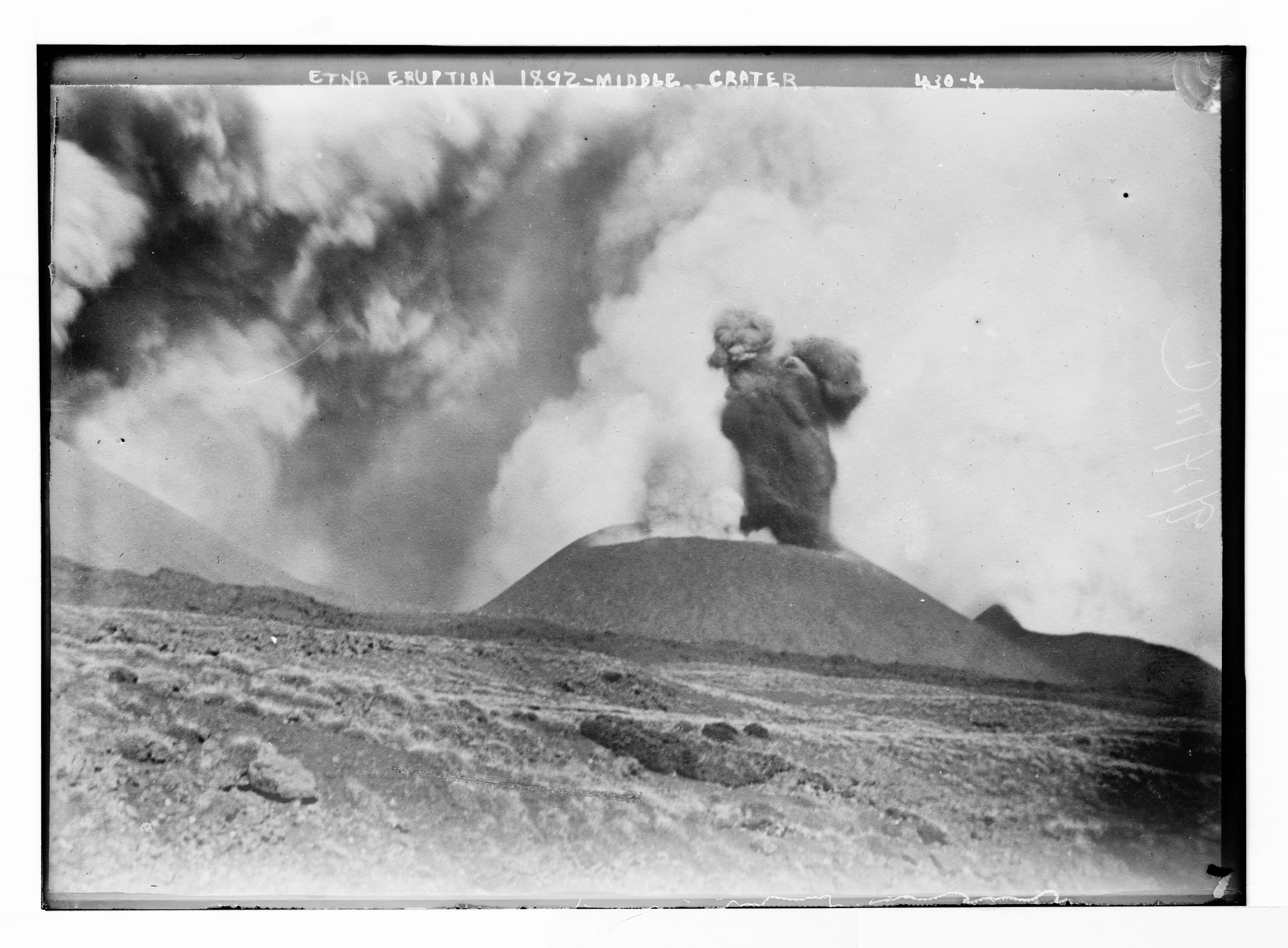
Eruption on the Mount Etna vulcano in Sicily

- 8 July – Eruption on the southern flank of the Mount Etna volcano in Sicily. Eruptions would continue to 29 December 1892. A spectacular row of pyroclastic cones was formed named Monti Silvestri, in honour of the Italian volcanologist Orazio Silvestri (1835 – 1890).

=== August ===
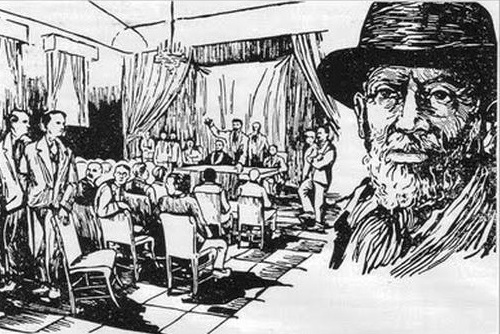
Founding of the Italian Socialist Party on 14 August 1892, at the Sala Sivori in Genoa. Portrait of Filippo Turati. Drawing published in the Gazzetta del Popolo.

- August 14 – Foundation of the Partito dei Lavoratori Italiani (Italian Workers Party) a forerunner of the Italian Socialist Party (Partito Socialista Italiano, PSI) in Genoa by Filippo Turati, Claudio Treves and Leonida Bissolati.

=== September ===
- September 8 – Foundation of the Fascio in Corleone, which would evolve into one of the first and best-organized groups, by Bernardino Verro.

=== October ===
- October 6 – The opera Cristoforo Colombo by Alberto Franchetti premiered at Genoa's Teatro Carlo Felice to commemorate the 400th anniversary of Christopher Columbus' arrival in America.

=== November ===
- November 6 – First round of the Italian general election.
- November 13 – Second round of the Italian general election. The "ministerial" left-wing bloc emerged as the largest in Parliament, winning 323 of the 508 seats.
- November 27 – Founding of L'Asino (The Donkey) in Rome, a magazine of political satire, by Guido Podrecca and Gabriele Galantara.

=== December ===
- December 6 – Giolitti's Treasury Minister, Bernardino Grimaldi, and Agriculture Minister, Pietro Lacava, introduce a bill aimed at providing the existing banks the right to issue currency for another six years. The close friendship of Grimaldi with the governor of the Banca Romana, Bernardo Tanlongo, increased suspicion of wrongdoing in Banca Romana scandal.
- December 20 – The Socialist deputy Napoleone Colajanni reads out long extracts of a report on the Banca Romana in Parliament and Prime Minister Giovanni Giolitti is forced to appoint an expert commission to investigate the Banca Romana scandal.

== Literature ==
- Gabriele D'Annunzio - L'Innocente
- Italo Svevo - Una Vita

== Music ==
- Alfredo Catalani - La Wally
- Francesco Cilea - La Tilda
- Alberto Franchetti - Cristoforo Colombo
- Umberto Giordano - Mala vita
- Ruggero Leoncavallo - Pagliacci
- Pietro Mascagni - I Rantzau

== Births ==
- January 2 – Edoardo Agnelli, Italian industrialist and principal family shareholder of the Italian car company Fiat (died 1935)
- January 17 – Amedeo Mecozzi, Italian fighter ace of World War I and a military theorist (died 1971)
- January 28 – Augusto Genina, Italian film pioneer, movie producer and director (died 1957)
- January 28 – Carlo Emilio Bonferroni, Italian mathematician who worked on probability theory (died 1960)
- February 4 – Ugo Betti, Italian judge and playwright (died 1953)
- February 8 – Luigi Bartolini, Italian painter, writer, and poet (died 1963)
- February 8 – Bruno Fortichiari, Italian communist politician (died 1981)
- February 29 – Leandro Arpinati, Italian fascist politician (died 1945)
- March 9 – Carlo Bisiach, Italian violin maker (died 1968)
- March 23 – Anastase Alfieri, Italian entomologist (died 1971)
- March 29 – Giuseppe Colosi, Italian zoologist (died 1975)
- March 30 – Fortunato Depero, Italian futurist painter, writer, sculptor and graphic designer (died 1960)
- April 4 – Italo Mus, Italian impressionist painter (died 1967)
- April 10 – Victor de Sabata, Italian conductor and composer (died 1967)
- April 11 – Francesca Bertini (born Elena Seracini Vitiello), Italian silent film actress (died 1985)
- April 15 – Cesare Zerba, Italian cardinal of the Roman Catholic Church (died 1973)
- May 18 – Ezio Pinza, Italian basso opera singer (died 1957)
- June 8 – Giuseppe Campari, Italian opera singer and Grand Prix motor racing driver (died 1933)
- July 11 – Giorgio Federico Ghedini, Italian composer (died 1965)
- July 14 – Attilio Piccioni, Italian politician (died 1976)
- August 12 – Giuseppe Di Vittorio', Italian syndicalist trade unionist and communist politician also known under the pseudonym Nicoletti (died 1957)
- August 13 – Aldo De Benedetti, Italian screenwriter (died 1970)
- August 26 – Gaetano Belloni, Italian professional road racing cyclist (died 1980)
- October 12
  - Gilda Dalla Rizza, Italian soprano (died 1975)
  - Giovanni De Briganti, Italian aviator (died 1937)
- November 16 – Tazio Giorgio Nuvolari, Italian motorcycle and racecar driver, known as Il Mantovano Volante (The Flying Mantuan) (died 1953)
- December 10 – Ettore Desderi, Italian composer (died 1974)
- December 11 – Giacomo Lauri-Volpi, Italian tenor (died 1979)

== Deaths ==
- January 18 – Giovanni Maria Cornoldi, Italian Jesuit academic (born 1822)
- March 21 – Annibale de Gasparis, Italian astronomer (born 1819)
- April 18 – Agostino Todaro, Italian botanist and politician (born 1818)
- May 1 – Francesco Lamperti, Italian singing teacher (born 1811)
- July 17 – Carlo Cafiero, Italian anarchist and champion of Mikhail Bakunin (born 1846)
- August 11 – Enrico Betti, Italian mathematician (born 1823)
- September 8 – Enrico Cialdini, Duca di Gaeta, Italian soldier, politician and diplomat (born 1811)
- October 18 – Matteo Liberatore, Italian Jesuit philosopher (born 1810)
- December 1 – Carlo Favetti, Italian politician and lawyer from Gorizia (born 1819)
- December 5 – Ciccio Cappuccio, head of the Camorra in Naples (born c. 1842)
