= 1885 in Italy =

- Decades: 1860s; 1870s; 1880s; 1890s; 1900s
- See also: History of Italy; Timeline of Italian history; List of years in Italy

Events from the year 1885 in Italy

== Kingdom of Italy ==
- Monarch – Umberto I (1878–1900)
- Prime Minister – Agostino Depretis (1881–1887)

The total population of Italy in 1885 (within the current borders) was 30.511 million. Life expectancy in 1885 was 36.9 years.

== Events ==
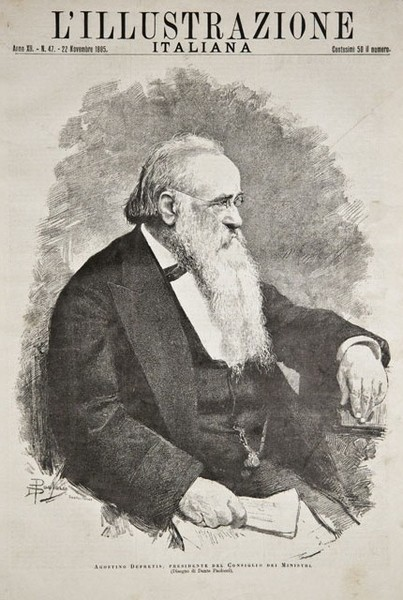
Agostino Depretis in 1885

Italy still suffers from the cholera outbreak in 1884. According to official estimates, cholera killed 50,000 Italians between 1884 and 1887. The course of the disease led to a slide into a state of near anarchy in Sicily in 1885 and 1886 as fear of infection engulfed the island and the people of towns and villages desperately set up makeshift sanitary cordons in defiance of the authorities.
Italy was hit by the global fall in agricultural prices after 1880. The price of wheat fell from an average of 331 lire per tonne in 1878-80 to 245 lire in 1883 and 228 lire in 1885, official figures show. There was competition from cheap US grain and Asian rice, but also the return of the lira to gold convertibility in 1883 caused import prices to fall further.

=== January ===
- 15 January — A law to the redevelopment the city of Naples is approved after a devastating cholera outbreak in 1884 due to extremely poor sanitary conditions. The law provided the needed 100 million lire for the renewal of the city. The radical transformation of the city called risanamento intended to improve the sewerage infrastructure and replace the most clustered areas, considered the main cause of insalubrity, with large and airy avenues.

=== February ===
- 5 February — Italian troops of the Corpo Speciale per l'Africa (Special Corps for Africa), commanded by Colonel Tancredi Saletta, move into Massawa in Italian Eritrea without resistance or protest from its Egyptian garrison. The outbreak of the Mahdist uprising in the Sudan had changed the political situation in the Horn of Africa. Egypt was unable to maintain its garrison in Massawa and, with British approval and using the massacre of the explorer Gustavo Bianchi in 1884 as a pretext, the government had decided to take action in December 1884. The move will eventually lead to the Italo-Ethiopian War of 1887–1889.

=== March ===
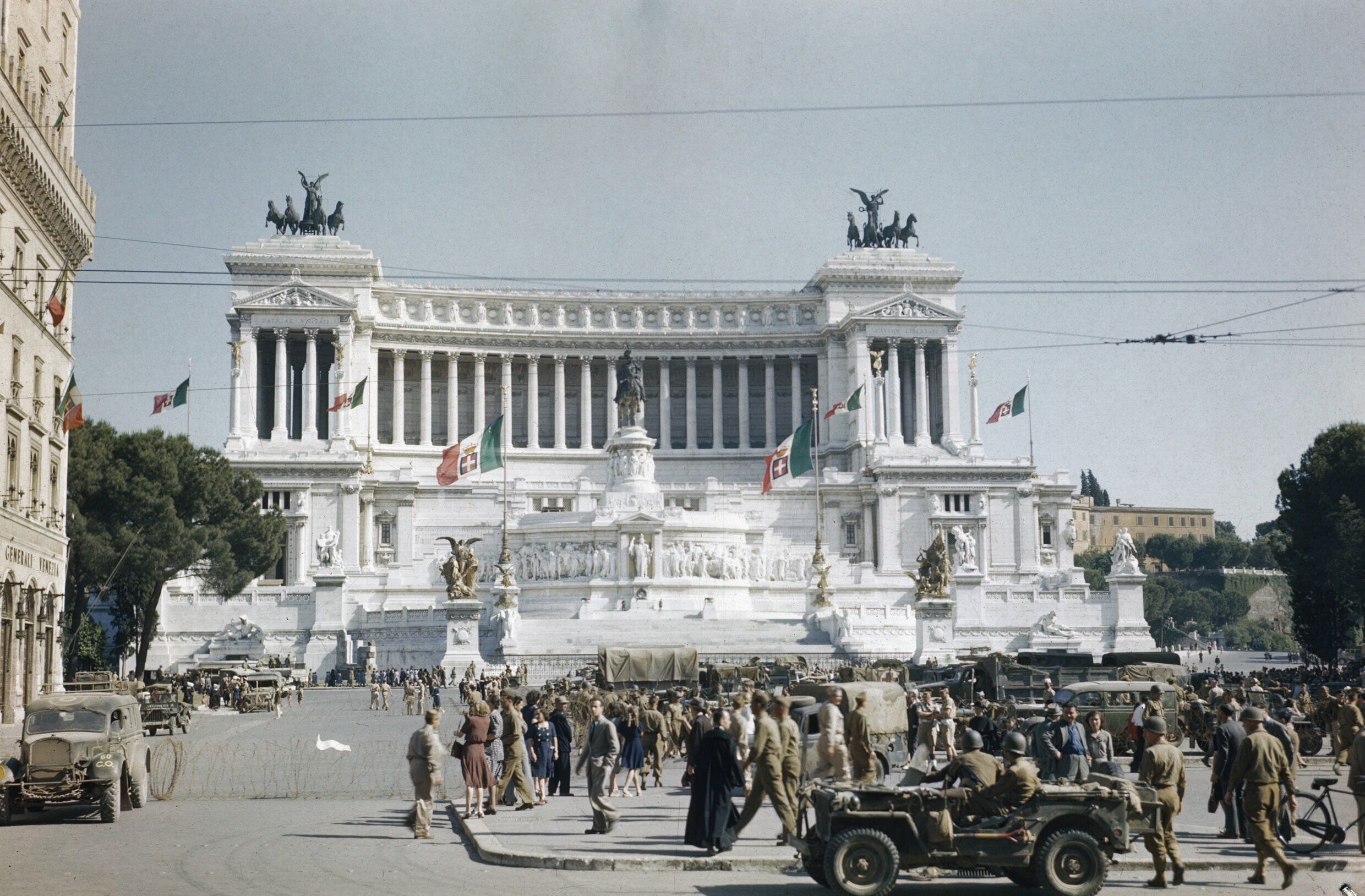
A completed Vittoriano in 1944

- 22 March — Construction of the Monument to honour Victor Emmanuel II, the first king of a unified Italy, (Vittoriano) begins in Rome (1885–1911). The solemn ceremony of laying the foundation stone of the Vittoriano took place on 22 March 1885 in the presence of King Umberto I of Savoy. To erect the Vittoriano it was necessary to proceed with numerous expropriations and extensive demolitions of the buildings that were on the site.
  The overall aim was also to make Rome a modern European capital that would rival Berlin, Vienna, London and Paris by overcoming the centuries-old urban planning of Papal Rome. In this context, the Vittoriano would have been the equivalent of Berlin's Brandenburg Gate, London's Admiralty Arch and the Opéra Garnier in Paris: these buildings all share a monumental and classical appearance that metaphorically communicates the pride and power of the nation of which they are the symbol.

=== May ===
- 20 May — The sixth International Sanitary Conference opened in Rome convened by the Italian government as a result of the outbreak of cholera in the country in 1884.

=== June ===
- 29 June — Reshuffle of the Depretis government.

== Births ==
- 11 January — Arnaldo Mussolini, journalist and politician. He was the brother of fascist Prime Minister of Italy Benito Mussolini (d. 1931)
- 21 January — Umberto Nobile, aviator, aeronautical engineer and Arctic explorer. The first man to fly over the North Pole. (d. 1978)
- 12 May — Mario Sironi, Modernist artist who was active as a painter, sculptor, illustrator, and designer (d. 1961)
- 22 May — Giacomo Matteotti, socialist politician, kidnapped and killed by the secret political police of Benito Mussolini. (d. 1924)
- 27 August — Cordula Poletti, writer, poet, playwright, and feminist. One of the first women in Italy to openly declare her lesbianism (d. 1971)

== Deaths ==
- 20 October — Michele Novaro, composer (b. 1818)
- 26 December — Rosa Vercellana, commonly known as 'Rosina' and, in Piedmontese, as La Bela Rosin, was the mistress and later wife of Victor Emmanuel II, King of Italy. Despite this, the morganatic status of her marriage meant that she was never recognized as Queen of Italy (b. 1833)

== Sources ==
- Agnew, John (2005). The Impossible Capital: Monumental Rome under Liberal and Fascist Regimes, 1870-1943. Wiley Blackwell.
- Clark, Martin (2008). Modern Italy, 1871 to the Present. Harlow/New York: Pearson Longman. ISBN 978-1-4058-2352-4.
- Pakenham, Thomas (1991). The scramble for Africa 1876-1912. London: Abacus. ISBN 0-349-10449-2.
- Snowden, Frank M. (1995). Naples in the time of cholera, 1884-1911. Cambridge: Cambridge University Press. ISBN 978-0-585-13106-1.
- Tripodi, Paolo (1999). "An Historical Perspective on Italian Colonialism". The Colonial Legacy in Somalia. Rome and Mogadishu: From Colonial Administration to Operation Restore Hope. Macmillan and St. Martin's Press. pp. 9–48.
