= Zenatello =

Zenatello is an Italian surname. Notable people with the surname include:

- Giovanni Zenatello (1876–1949), Italian opera singer
- Maria Gay Zenatello (1876–1943), Catalan opera singer
- Alessandro Zenatello (1891–1977), Italian painter
