= 1890 in Italy =

- Decades: 1870s; 1880s; 1890s; 1900s; 1910s
- See also: History of Italy; Timeline of Italian history; List of years in Italy

Events from the year 1890 in Italy.

== Kingdom of Italy ==
- Monarch – Umberto I (1878–1900)
- Prime Minister – Francesco Crispi (1887–1891)

The total population of Italy in 1890 (within the current borders) was 31.611 million. Life expectancy in 1890 was 38.5 years.

== Events ==
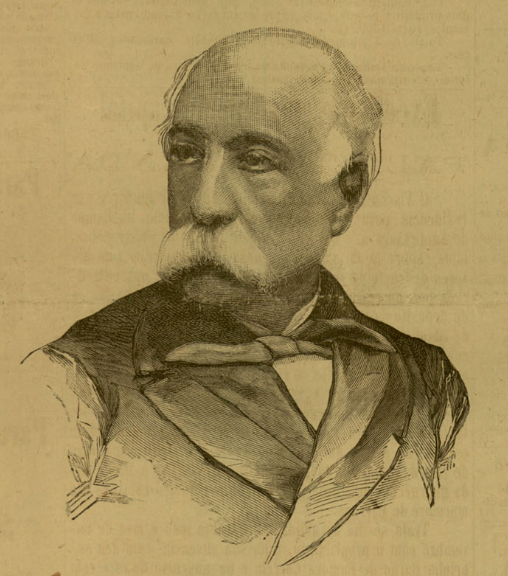
Prime minister Francesco Crispi

The 1889 Italian Penal Code, commonly known as Zanardelli Code enters into force. It was named after Giuseppe Zanardelli, then Minister of Justice, who promoted the approval of the code. It unified penal legislation in Italy, abolished capital punishment and recognised the right to strike.

=== January ===
- 1 January – The Kingdom of Italy establishes Italian Eritrea as its colony in the Horn of Africa.

=== May ===
- 17 May – The opera Cavalleria Rusticana by Pietro Mascagni premiers at the Teatro Costanzi in Rome.
- 31 May – The Teatro Massimo Bellini opera house in Catania, Sicily, named after the local-born composer Vincenzo Bellini, is inaugurated with a performance of the composer's masterwork, Norma.

=== June ===
- 27 June – In the First Battle of Agordat Italy defeats Mahdist Sudan.

=== October ===
- October – Emperor Menelik II contests the Italian text of the 1889 Treaty of Wuchale, stating that it did not oblige Ethiopia to be an Italian protectorate. In 1893, Menelik would officially denounced the entire treaty. The attempt by the Italians to impose a protectorate over Ethiopia by force was finally confounded by their defeat at the Battle of Adwa in 1896, that ended the First Italo-Ethiopian War. An agreement after the battle cancelled the Wuchale Treaty and recognised Ethiopia's full sovereignty and independence, but the Italians were allowed to keep Italian Eritrea.
- 15 October – The Ab apostolici papal encyclical against Freemasonry in Italy is promulgated by Pope Leo XIII.

=== November ===
- 15 November – The French, café-chantant inspired Salone Margherita is officially opened by the Marino brothers in Naples.
- 23 November – First round of the Italian general election.
- 30 November – Second round of the Italian general election. The "ministerial" left-wing bloc of the Historical Left led by Francesco Crispi emerged as the largest in Parliament, winning 401 of the 508 seats.

=== December ===
- 9 December – The Finance Minister, Giovanni Giolitti, and the Minister of Public Works, Gaspare Finali, resign over a contrast on the Ministry of Public Works expenses.

== Births ==
- 10 January – Pina Menichelli, Italian silent film actress (d. 1984)
- 19 January – Ferruccio Parri, Italian partisan and Prime Minister (d. 1981)
- 11 February – Anton Giulio Bragaglia, pioneer in Futurist photography and Futurist cinema (d. 1960)
- 16 February – Francesco de Pinedo, Italian aviator (d. 1933)
- 20 March – Beniamino Gigli, Italian tenor (d. 1957)
- 11 April – Rachele Mussolini, Italian wife of Benito Mussolini (d. 1979)
- 23 June – Salvatore Papaccio, Italian tenor (d. 1977)
- 20 July – Giorgi Morandi, Italian modernist painter and printmaker (d.1964)
- 10 September – Elsa Schiaparelli, Italian fashion designer (d. 1973)

== Deaths ==
- 8 January – Giorgio Ronconi, operatic baritone (b. 1810)
- 10 April – Aurelio Saffi, politician, active during the period of Italian unification close to Giuseppe Mazzini (b. 1819)
- 17 August – Orazio Silvestri, geologist and volcanologist (b. 1835)
- 26 October – Carlo Collodi, Italian writer (The Adventures of Pinocchio) (b. 1826)
