= 1889 in Italy =

- Decades: 1860s; 1870s; 1880s; 1890s; 1900s
- See also: History of Italy; Timeline of Italian history; List of years in Italy

Events from the year 1889 in Italy

== Kingdom of Italy ==
- Monarch – Umberto I (1878–1900)
- Prime Minister – Francesco Crispi (1887–1891)

The total population of Italy in 1889 (within the current borders) was 31.325 million. Life expectancy in 1889 was 39.1 years.

== Events ==
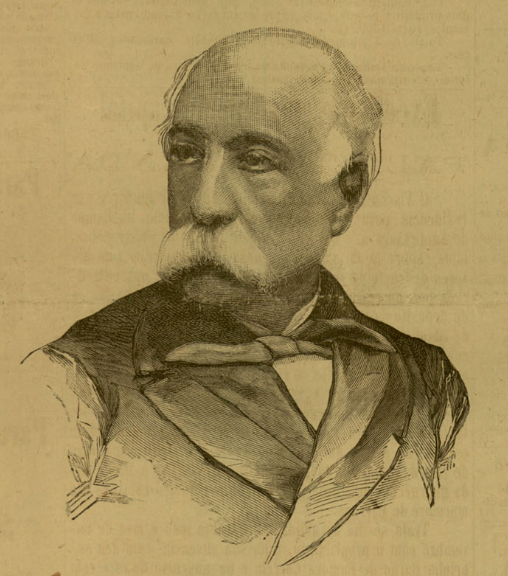
Prime minister Francesco Crispi

Due to the tariff war with France, business confidence was undermined and in 1889, a real estate boom burst. Three banks in Turin, seriously involved in building speculation in Rome, failed. Small savers lost several hundred million lire and 80,000 building workers in Rome — mainly immigrants — found themselves out of a job. In February 1889 some of them rioted.

=== March ===
- 9 March – Reshuffle of the Crispi government.

=== Maʏ ===
- 2 May – Signing of the Treaty of Wuchale between the Ethiopian Empire and the Kingdom of Italy after the Italian occupation of Eritrea in the small Ethiopian town of Wuchale. King Menelik II had just won the imperial crown with the aid of Italian money and weapons. The purpose of the treaty was to promote friendship and trade among the two countries. Article 17 of the treaty was translated and interpreted differently by Ethiopia and Italy. Italy claimed the article imposed a protectorate over Ethiopia.

=== June ===
- In June 1889 inspections of the Banca Romana by a government commission revealed serious irregularities in its administration and accounts and that 91 percent of the assets of the bank were illiquid. Prime Minister Francesco Crispi and his Treasury Minister Giovanni Giolitti knew of the 1889 government inspection report, but feared that exposure might undermine public confidence and suppressed the report. The inspections followed the suspension of payments of three banks in Turin, that were seriously involved in building speculation in Rome.
- 9 June – The Monument to Giordano Bruno, created by Ettore Ferrari, was erected at Campo de' Fiori square in Rome, Italy, to commemorate the italian philosopher Giordano Bruno, who was burned there in 1600 after being tried for heresy by the Roman Inquisition on charges of denial of several core Catholic doctrines. Since its inception the idea of a monument dedicated to the executed heretic located in Rome, once the capital of the Papal States, has generated controversy between anti-clerical and those more aligned with the Roman Catholic church.
- 11 June – According to popular contemporary legend the archetypal pizza Margherita was invented by the Neapolitan pizzaiolo ("pizza maker") Raffaele Esposito to create a pizza in honor of the visiting Queen Margherita. The Queen strongly preferred a pizza swathed in the colors of the Italian flag — red (tomato), green (basil), and white (mozzarella).
- 30 June – The Italian Penal Code of 1889, known as the Zanardelli Code because it was named after Giuseppe Zanardelli, then Minister of Justice, was unanimously approved by both Chambers of the Parliament of the Kingdom of Italy. It unified penal legislation in Italy, abolished capital punishment and recognised the right to strike. It came into force on 1 January 1890.

== Births ==
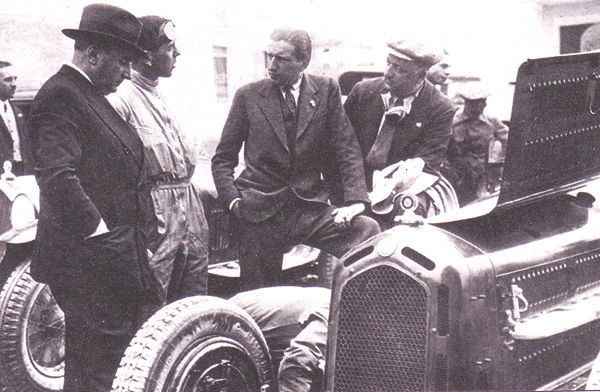
Edoardo Weber (left)

- 2 January – Tito Schipa, lyric tenor (died 1965)
- 7 February – Claudia Muzio, operatic lyric soprano (died 1936)
- 8 February – Amedeo Marchi, gymnast
- 8 March – Alessandro Scarioni, footballer (died 1966)
- 14 March – Oscar Chisini, mathematician (died 1967)
- 13 June – Amadeo Bordiga, Marxist theorist, revolutionary socialist, founder of the Communist Party of Italy (PCI) (died 1970)
- 12 September – Raffaele Cadorna Jr., general and one of the commanders of the Italian Resistance against German occupying forces in north Italy after 1943 (died 1973)
- 9 October – Guido Picelli, Communist politician and anti-fascist militant (died 1937)
- 8 November – Aldo Cevenini, footballer (died 1973)
- 29 November – Edoardo Weber, engineer and businessman, creator of the Weber carburetor (died 1945)

== Deaths ==
- 8 August – Benedetto Cairoli, politician, who served as Prime Minister of Italy for 2 years (born 1825).
- 18 October – Massimiliano Quilici, composer (born 1799).
- 18 October – Antonio Meucci, inventor (born 1808).
- 31 December – Giuseppe Apolloni, composer (born 1822).

== Sources ==
- Mack Smith, Denis (2001). Italy and Its Monarchy. New Haven: Yale University Press. ISBN 0-300-05132-8.
- Pakenham, Thomas (1991). The scramble for Africa 1876-1912. London: Abacus. ISBN 0-349-10449-2.
- Seton-Watson, Christopher (1967). Italy from liberalism to fascism, 1870–1925. London: Methuen & Co Ltd. ISBN 0-416-18940-7.
