= Giulio Litta =

Italian composer (1822–1891)

Giulio Litta, Viscount Arese, (5 June 1822 – 29 May 1891) was an Italian composer. He was trained at the Milan Conservatory where his first opera, Bianca di Santafiora, premiered in 1843. He composed several more operas, most of which premiered at theatres in Milan. His last opera, Il violino di Cremona, was heard at La Scala in 1882.
