= 1887 in Italy =

- Decades: 1860s; 1870s; 1880s; 1890s; 1900s
- See also: History of Italy; Timeline of Italian history; List of years in Italy

Events from the year 1887 in Italy

== Kingdom of Italy ==
- Monarch – Umberto I (1878–1900)
- Prime Minister –
  1. Agostino Depretis (1881–1887)
  2. Francesco Crispi (1887–1891)

The total population of Italy in 1887 (within the current borders) was 30.937 million. Life expectancy in 1887 was 36.0 years.

== Events ==
The year is marked by the start of the Italo-Ethiopian War of 1887–1889, an undeclared war between the Kingdom of Italy and the Ethiopian Empire occurring during the Italian colonization of Eritrea.
In 1887, the real estate boom began to deflate and a number of banks that had provided generous loans to the construction industry ran into serious problems. Some banks went bankrupt after a clumsily planned and failed bailout attempt by the Banca Nazionale, when in 1889 the bubble bursted. Three banks in Turin, seriously involved in building speculation in Rome, had to suspend payments.

=== January ===
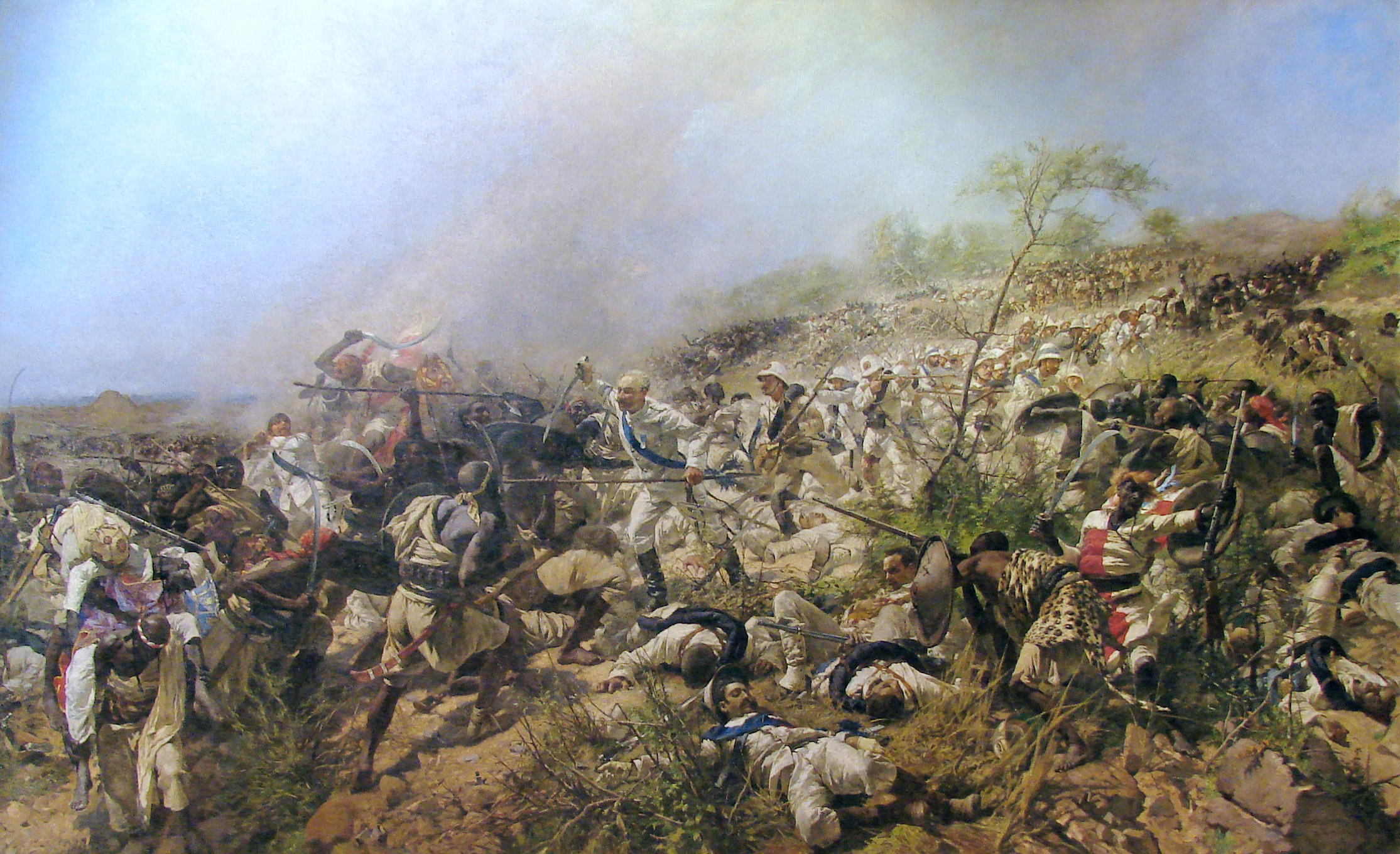
The battle of Dogali by Michele Cammarano

- 25 January – Italian troops move into the hinterland of Massawa, territory claimed by Ethiopia, brought her forces into conflict with those of Ethiopia, specifically those of Ras Alula, governor of Mareb Mellash. On 24 or 25 January 1887, Alula attacked the Italian fort at Saati. In the ensuing skirmish, his troops were beaten back.
- 26 January – An Ethiopian force of about 15,000 men ambushed an Italian battalion sent to reinforce Saati and almost annihilated it at the Battle of Dogali, 10 miles (16 km) west of Massawa. The Italian response was immediate. The Italian parliament voted 5,000,000 lire for troops to reinforce Massawa. An Italian force was sent to garrison the interior, while Emperor Yohannes IV withdrew his forces to avoid confrontation. Disease ravaged the Italian troops and they were pulled out in March 1887, ending the first phase of the war. The battle marks the start of the Italo-Ethiopian War of 1887–1889.

=== February ===
- 12 February – The Mediterranean Agreement signed by Great Britain with Italy (through the mediation of Germany). The agreement would become part of a series of treaties signed in 1887. Agreements with Austria-Hungary on 24 March and with Spain on 4 May followed. The treaties recognised and promoted the status quo in the Mediterranean Sea.
- 23 February – The 1887 Liguria earthquake strikes off the coast of Imperia, with an estimated moment magnitude of 6.8–6.9, killing about 600–3,000 people. It also generated a tsunami that had a run-up height of 2 meters.

=== April ===
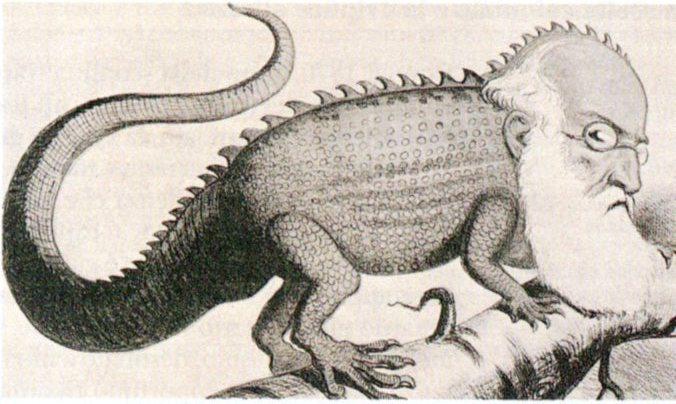
A cartoon about Agostino Depretis, accusing him of being a chameleonic politician

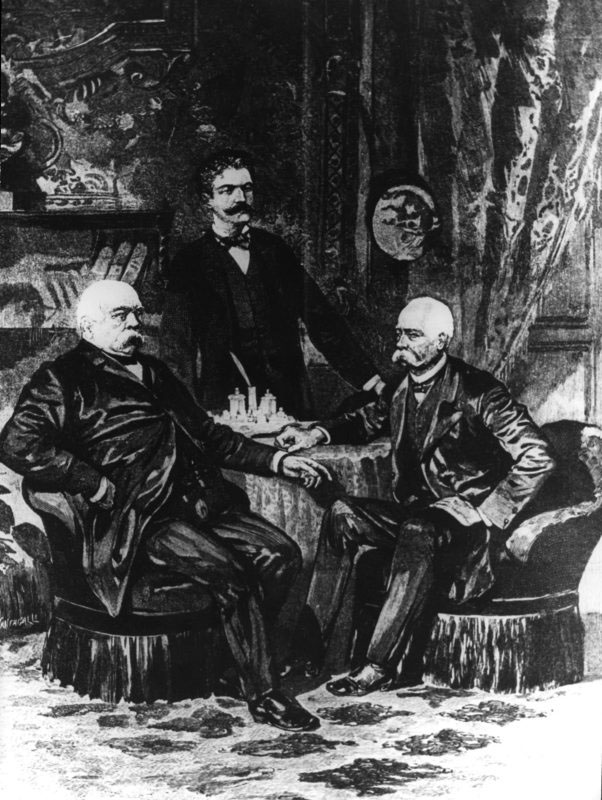
Francesco Crispi with German Chancellor Otto von Bismarck in 1887

- 4 April – Prime Minister Depretis, weakened by the failure of Dogali, has to carry out a major cabinet reshuffle. After accepting the resignations of the Minister of Foreign Affairs and the Minister of War, he has to call Francesco Crispi, leader of the anti-government Dissident Left, into the government.

=== June ===
- 2 June – The Italian parliament voted a further 200,000,000 lire for troops, ammunition and supplies to be sent to Massawa. During the summer, an expeditionary force of 20,000 men was assembled in Italy. It landed in Massawa during November.

=== July ===
- 14 July – A strict protectionist tariff is established in Italy in an attempt to support fledgling industry, applicable from 1 January 1888. It marked the start of a tariff war with France that led to the economic crisis of 1888-1894.
- 29 July – Prime Minister Agostino Depretis dies at 74 years old. Depretis's death marks the end of a parliamentary strategy, known as trasformismo, that saw the Left attempt to forge closer ties with the Historical Right through coalition cabinets. He is succeeded by the Minister of the Interior, Francesco Crispi, forming his first government. Crispi increasingly focused government efforts on foreign policy. He worked to build Italy as a great world power through increased military expenditures and advocacy of expansionism.

=== October ===
- 2 October – Prime Minister Crispi visits Germany and meets German Chancellor Otto von Bismarck, for consultation upon the working of the Triple Alliance.

== Births ==
- 28 January – Francesco Merli, opera singer (d. 1976)
- 25 May – Padre Pio (born Francesco Forgione), Capuchin friar, priest, stigmatist, and mystic (d. 1968)
- 12 August – Italo Gismondi, archaeologist, known for Il Plastico, a massive scale model of imperial Rome under Constantine the Great (d. 1974)
- 10 September – Giovanni Gronchi, politician from Christian Democracy who served as the president of Italy from 1955 to 1962 (d. 1978)
- 23 September – Alfieri Maserati, automotive engineer, known for establishing and leading the Maserati racing car manufacturer with the other Maserati Brothers (d. 1932)
- 13 December – Luigi Pio Tessitori, Indologist and linguist (d. 1919)

== Deaths ==
- 29 July – Prime Minister Agostino Depretis (b. 1813)
- 13 September – Felice Matteucci, hydraulic engineer who co-invented an internal combustion engine with Eugenio Barsanti (b. 1808)

== Sources ==
- Gabre-Selassie, Zewde (2005). "Continuity and Discontinuity in Menelik's Foreign Policy". In Paulos Milkias; Getachew Metaferia (eds.). The Battle of Adwa: Reflections on Ethiopia's Historic Victory Against European Colonialism. New York: Algora.
- Henze, Paul B. (2000). Layers of Time: A History of Ethiopia. New York: Palgrave.
- Mack Smith, Denis (1997). Modern Italy: A Political History. Ann Arbor: The University of Michigan Press. ISBN 0-472-10895-6.
- Sarkees, Meredith Reid; Wayman, Frank Whelon (2010). Resort to War: A Data Guide to Inter-State, Extra-state, Intra-State, and Non-State Wars, 1816–2007. Washington, D.C.: CQ Press.
- Seton-Watson, Christopher (1967). Italy from liberalism to fascism, 1870–1925. London: Methuen & Co Ltd. ISBN 0-416-18940-7.
