= 1884 in Italy =

- Decades: 1860s; 1870s; 1880s; 1890s; 1900s
- See also: History of Italy; Timeline of Italian history; List of years in Italy

Events from the year 1884 in Italy

== Kingdom of Italy ==
- Monarch – Umberto I (1878–1900)
- Prime Minister – Agostino Depretis (1881–1887)

The total population of Italy in 1884 (within the current borders) was 30.221 million. Life expectancy in 1884 was 36.6 years.

== Events ==
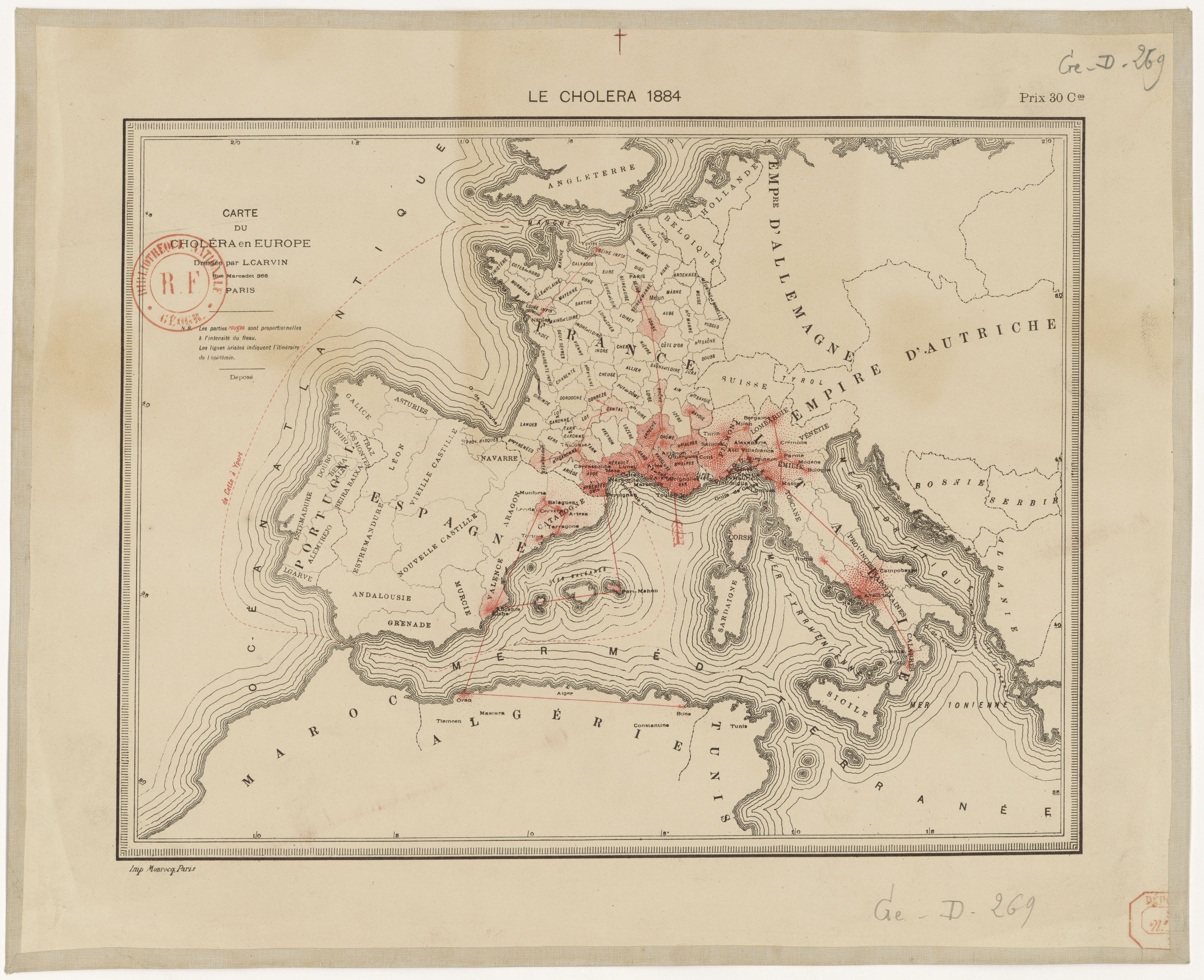
The spread of cholera in the Mediterranean in 1884

The 1881–1896 cholera pandemic reaches Italy. According to official estimates, cholera killed 50,000 Italians between 1884 and 1887. Cholera reached the Mediterranean in 1884 with an outbreak in France's main naval base at Toulon in June. The most likely source was a transport ship with goods returning from France's colonial war in Indo-China. At that time a cholera epidemic raged in South-East Asia, and the passage of French ships and troops and between Toulon and Saigon, moving through the Suez Canal, facilitated the entry of the disease to the Mediterranean Sea. The pandemic reached Italy by way of Italian migrant workers who left France.

=== January ===
- 6 January — Giuseppe Colombo founds the Italian Société Générale d'Électricité Edison system in Milan.

=== March ===
- 10 March — Foundation of the Terni steelworks in Umbria with state guarantees and capital from several large banks, such as the Banca Generale, Credito Mobiliare and Banca Nazionale in the Kingdom of Italy. Construction, an important step in the industrialization of Italy, of the plant began shortly afterwards with the support of workers from the French Schneider steelworks. Completion was reached after two years and showed a complex of international significance. The key initiator of the project was the Minister of the Navy Benedetto Brin, while the self-made industrialist, Ernesto Breda, was its technical designer. The main purpose was to free the Italian Royal Navy and the Italian railways from depending on foreign steel. The national output of steel, which had been under 4,000 tons in 1881, reached 158,000 tons in 1889.
- 30 March — Reshuffle in the Depretis government. Depretis moves closer to the Historical Right to broaden his parliamentary base. The financial policy of the Historical Left, which was much less rigorous than that of the Right, led to a resurgence of the deficit in the State budget.

=== April ===
- 26 April — The start of the 1884 Italian General Exhibition in Turin. The exhibition closed on 20 November 1884.

=== May ===
- 16 May — Italian inventor Angelo Moriondo patents the first espresso machine, or according to the patent "new steam machinery for the economic and instantaneous confection of coffee beverage". It was presented at the Turin exhibition.

=== June ===
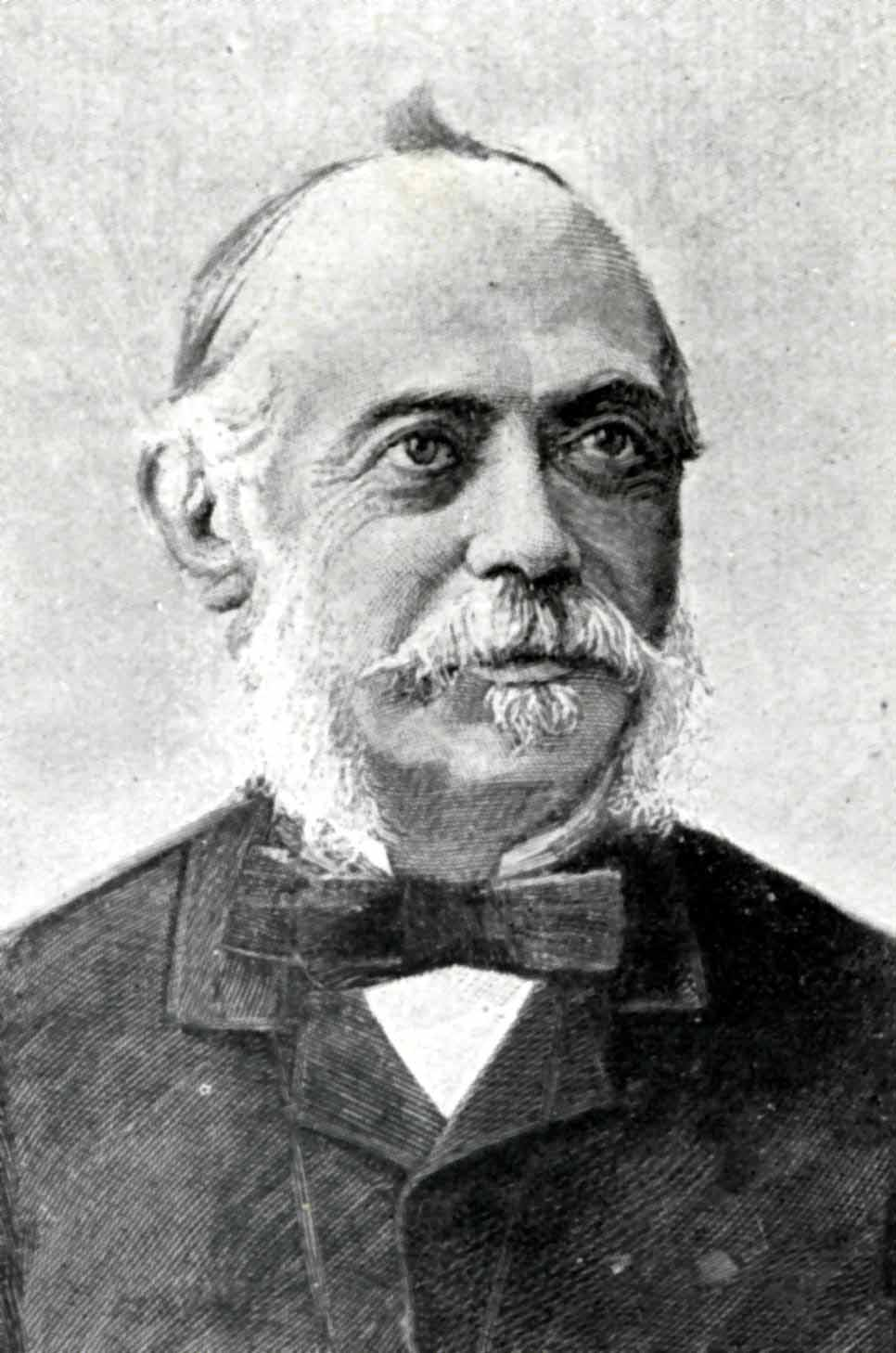
Senator Stefano Jacini

- June — Publication of the final report L'inchiesta agraria (The agrarian enquiry) by the parliamentary commission to inquire into the agricultural conditions of Italy, headed by senator Stefano Jacini, which had been commissioned by Parliament in 1877.
  According to the report, Italy was economically lagging behind the rest of Europe. It was a predominantly rural society, with over 60% of the population working on the land. The report painted a picture of agriculture that has made only marginal progress since the Middle Ages, characterised by enormous inequalities between regions (in soil fertility, land ownership structure, the existence or non-existence of agrarian capitalism, techniques, and the level of wages, rents and sharecropping). Poverty, stagnation, low levels of investment on the part of large landowners, the tiny size of farms and the absence of a modern transport network characterised Italian agriculture in the 1870s and 1880s. In the towns, populated by craftsmen and shopkeepers, the situation was better. For the most part, industry had not progressed beyond the factory stage, with peasants working at home during the winter months (textiles) or day labourers from the agricultural sector working in the mines or on building sites in the off-season.
- 26 June — The first Italian officially to fall ill of cholera on Italian soil is a migrant worker who arrived at Ventimiglia from Toulon.

=== August ===
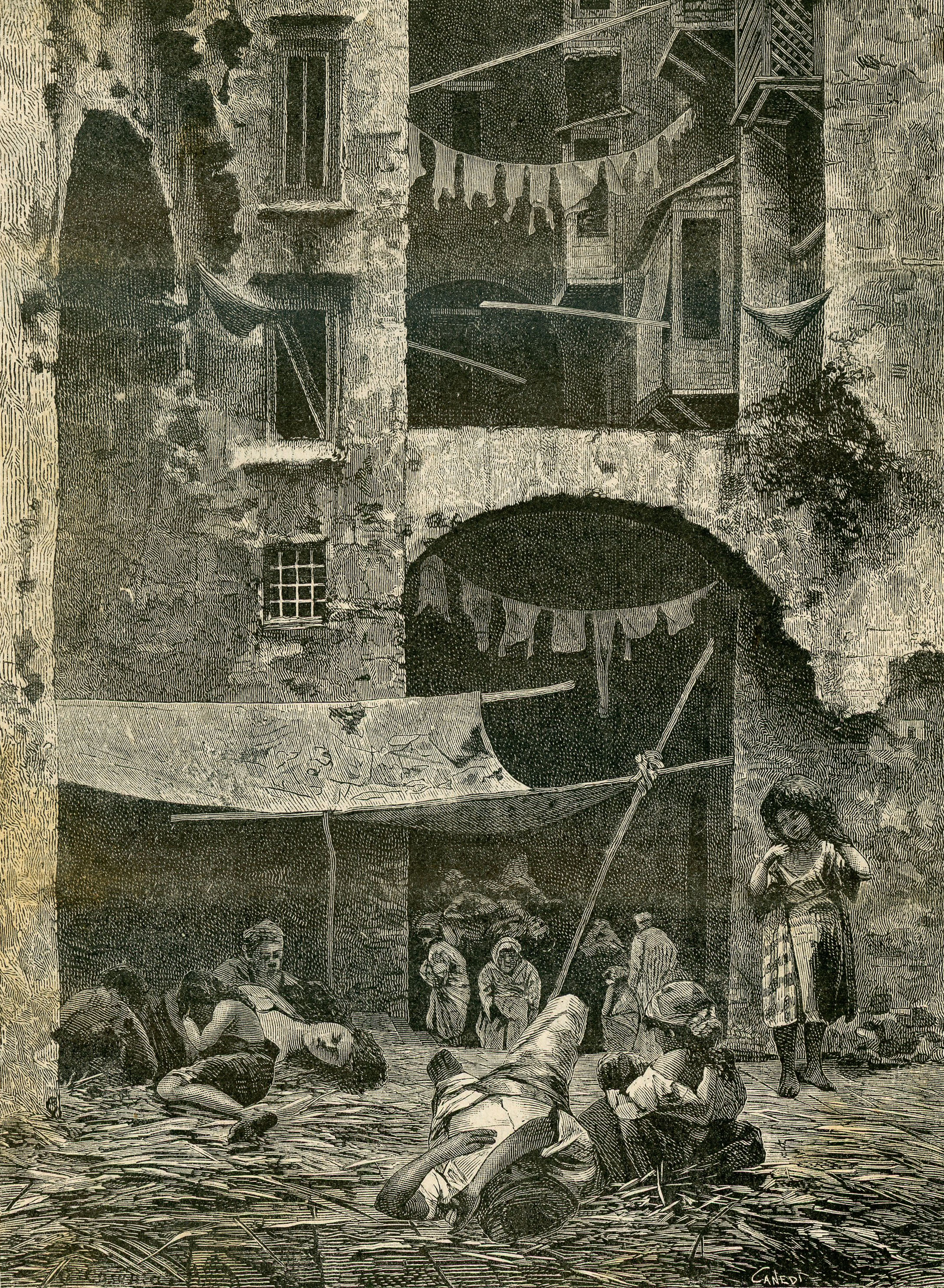
Cholera in a neighbourhood of the poor in Naples

- August — An outbreak of cholera in the summer and autumn of 1884 hit Naples. At the end of the outbreak in mid-November 1884, 7,143 cholera deaths had officially been documented at the municipal cemetery, while the municipal administration had recorded a total of 14,233 infected people. However, the official statistics were unreliable and substantially underestimated the confirmed mortality from cholera due to underreporting, according to knowledgeable observers. The actual number of deaths even before the end of September, when the outbreak ravaged the city, exceeded 9,000, the American consul reported to the U.S. State Department. While municipal sources listed 10,000 cases since the inception of the epidemic The Times asserted that a more honest estimate would be 18,000 to 20,000. Many deaths officially recorded as due to ‘other causes’ were probably disguised cholera cases.
  Statistics showed that the death rate due to extremely poor sanitary conditions was eight to ten times as heavy in the slums in the lower town as in the upperclass districts uphill. The Historical Far Left deputy Felice Cavallotti brought a squad of voluntary relief workers down from the north, the King and Prime minister Depretis and the Archbishop of Naples toured the stricken city, while newspapers filled their pages with descriptions of the living conditions of the poor.

== Births ==
- 22 March — Lyda Borelli, actress of cinema and theatre (d. 1959)
- 6 May — Edmondo Rossoni, revolutionary syndicalist leader and fascist politician (d. 1965)
- 23 May — Corrado Gini, statistician, demographer and sociologist who developed the Gini coefficient, a measure of the income inequality in a society (d. 1965)
- 26 June — Francesco Misiano, communist politician and film producer (d. 1936)
- 12 July — Amedeo Modigliani, painter and sculptor of the École de Paris who worked mainly in France (d. 1920)
- 14 July — Emilio Cecchi, literary critic, art critic and screenwriter (d. 1966)
- 16 October — Rembrandt Bugatti, sculptor, known primarily for his bronze sculptures of wildlife subjects (d. 1916)
- 14 November — Cesare Maria De Vecchi, soldier, colonial administrator and fascist politician (d. 1959)
- 18 November — Emma Strada, civil engineer, who was the first woman to obtain a civil engineering degree from the Polytechnic of Turin (d. 1970)

== Deaths ==
- 18 January — Raffaele Scalese, operatic bass who specialized in the opera buffa (b. 1800)
- 14 March — Quintino Sella, mathematician, politician, economist and mountaineer (b. 1827)
- 23 March — Angiolo Tricca, caricaturist and painter of historical themes (b. 1817)
- 21 August — Giuseppe De Nittis, painter whose work merges the styles of Salon art and Impressionism (b. 1846)
- 7 October — Gustavo Bianchi, explorer in Ethiopia and Italian Eritrea (b. 1845)
- 25 October — Carlo Alberto Castigliano, mathematician and physicist known for Castigliano's method (b. 1847)

== Sources ==
- Clark, Martin (2008). Modern Italy, 1871 to the Present. Harlow/New York: Pearson Longman. ISBN 978-1-4058-2352-4.
- Della Coletta, Cristina (2006). World's Fairs Italian-Style The Great Expositions in Turin and Their Narratives, 1860-1915. Toronto: University of Toronto. p. 46. ISBN 9781442658097.
- De Rosa, Gabriele (1994). Tempo religioso e tempo storico : saggi e note di storia sociale e religiosa dal medioevo all'età contemporanea. Rome: Ed. di Storia e Letteratura. ISBN 9788884980243.
- Seton-Watson, Christopher (1967). Italy from liberalism to fascism, 1870–1925. London: Methuen & Co Ltd. ISBN 0-416-18940-7.
- Snowden, Frank M. (1995). Naples in the time of cholera, 1884-1911. Cambridge: Cambridge University Press. ISBN 978-0-585-13106-1.
- Tripodi, Paolo (1999). "An Historical Perspective on Italian Colonialism". The Colonial Legacy in Somalia. Rome and Mogadishu: From Colonial Administration to Operation Restore Hope. Macmillan and St. Martin's Press. pp. 9–48.
