= Anastase Alfieri =

Italian entomologist

Anastase Alfieri (23 March 1892 Alexandria – 4 March 1971 Cairo) was an Italian entomologist who worked principally on Coleoptera but, also, with Hermann Preisner, on Heteroptera. Most of his work was on the fauna of Egypt.

He was an entomologist at the Royal Agricultural Society, Cairo, and by 1933 he worked at the Egyptian Ministry of Agriculture. He was secretary general of the Société Entomologique d'Égypte.

Alfieri identified several insects which had been discovered in the antechamber of the tomb of Tutankhamun; his work was included in Howard Carter’s 1933 volume of The Tomb of Tut Ankh-Amen.

Alfieri’s collection is shared between the natural history museum in Tutzing and the National Museum of Natural History in Washington D.C.

== Selected publications ==
- The Coleoptera of Egypt. Mem. Soc. Entomol. Egypt. 5:38.(1976)
- with Hermann Preisner, A review of the Hemiptera Heteroptera known to us from Egypt. Bulletin de la Société Fouad Ier d’Entomologie 37:1-119.(1953).

== General references ==
- Stearn, William T. (1978). "Anastase Alfieri (1892-1971), entomologist". Annales Musei Goulandris. 4: 307–310.
