= Alessandro Zenatello =

Italian painter

Alessandro Zenatello (7 December 1891 – 27 January 1977) was a modern Italian painter; his mature output included landscapes influenced by Macchiaioli styles and abstract paintings.

== Biography ==
He was born in Monteforte d'Alpone. His mother died in childbirth; he was raised in Caldiero. He studied in the Accademia Cignaroli of Verona and at the Academy of Fine Arts of Venice. As a young man, he moved to paint in the home of a friend in Rocca di Caldiero, where he lived until 1938. He exhibited at the 1912 Biennale of Venice, and the 1918 Turin Exposition. He frequently exhibited from 1918 to 1921 in exhibitions in Verona and at the Ca' Pesaro in Venice. He exhibited ten canvases at the International Exhibition in Vienna in 1921. Among his early influences were the Liberty style and Veronese painters around Felice Casorati such as Guido and Attilio Trentini, Angelo Zamboni, Guido Farina, Albano Vitturi, and Umberto Moggioli.

He painted frescoes, influenced by Mattielli, for the church of the Madonna Assunta in the parish of Garda (Life of Madonna), and in the parish church of Fumane (Christ clears the Temple of Merchants ) and the parish church of Caldiero. He also frescoed Celebrazione della Natura for the Villa Stefani di Noventa Vicentina. He died in Soave.

In 1938 he married Ines Marangoni, model for the painting of Fiocchi Rossi, and settled again in Rocca di Caldiera. His son was born in 1946. In 2014, his son donated three works to the Galleria d'arte moderna Achille Forti; the paintings are a Triptych of the Madonna degli Angeli (1915), Fiocchi Rossi (1914), and Spazi verdi (1930).
