= 1881–1896 cholera pandemic =

International outbreak of cholera

Fifth cholera pandemic
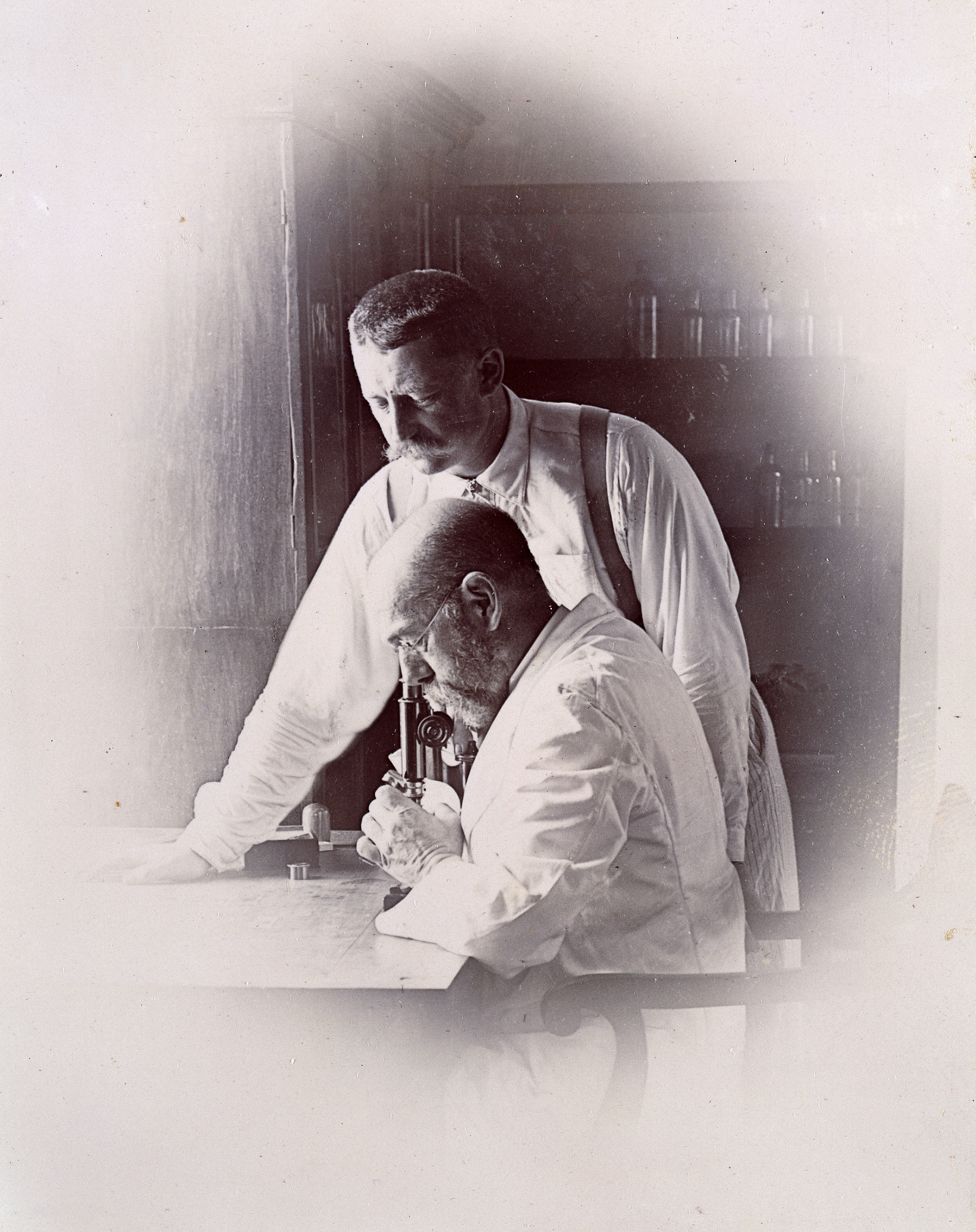
- German microbiologist Robert Koch (on the microscope) and Richard Friedrich Johannes Pfeiffer (standing) investigating cholera outbreak in Bombay, India
- Disease: Cholera
- Pathogen: Vibrio cholerae
- First outbreak: Ganges Delta in West Bengal
- Dates: 1881–1896

The fifth cholera pandemic (1881–1896) was the fifth major international outbreak of cholera in the 19th century. The endemic origin of the pandemic, as with those of its predecessors, was in the Ganges Delta in West Bengal. While the Vibrio cholerae bacteria had not been able to spread to western Europe until the 19th century, faster and improved modes of modern transportation, such as steamships and railways, reduced the duration of the journey considerably and facilitated the transmission of cholera and other infectious diseases. During the fourth 1863–1875 cholera pandemic, the third International Sanitary Conference convened in 1866 in Constantinople had identified religious pilgrimages to be "the most powerful of all causes" of cholera and again Hindu and Muslim pilgrimages were an important factor in the spread of the disease.

In addition, the growing colonial rule of the British in India, and France's colonial war in Indo-China, with its increased military presence and economic exchanges multiplied the connections both inside Asia and between Asia and Europe. Therefore, cholera for the first time could spread significantly outside its original source habitat on the Indian subcontinent, where it had been home for centuries. The fifth cholera pandemic would be known in Europe as the 'eastern plague'. A better insight in the disease and improved sanitation limited mortality largely in Europe and North America, although some substantial outbreaks in Europe did happen.

During this pandemic, there were significant scientific advances that improved the control of the disease. German microbiologist Robert Koch isolated Vibrio cholerae and proposed postulates to explain how bacteria caused disease. His work helped to establish the germ theory of disease. In 1892, the Russian-French bacteriologist Waldemar Haffkine, developed a cholera vaccine. (See: Scientific advances)

== Spread of the pandemic ==
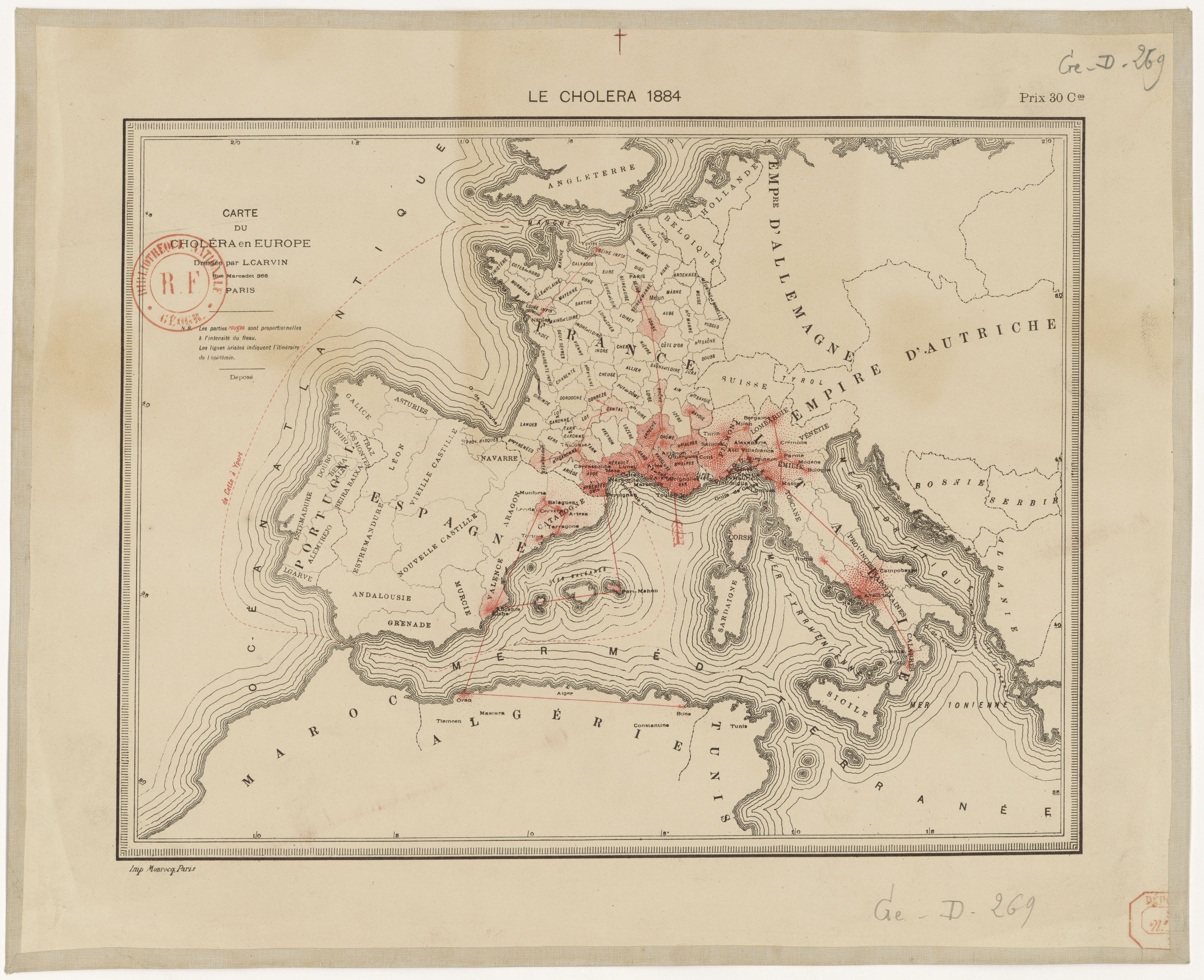
The spread of cholera in Europe in 1884

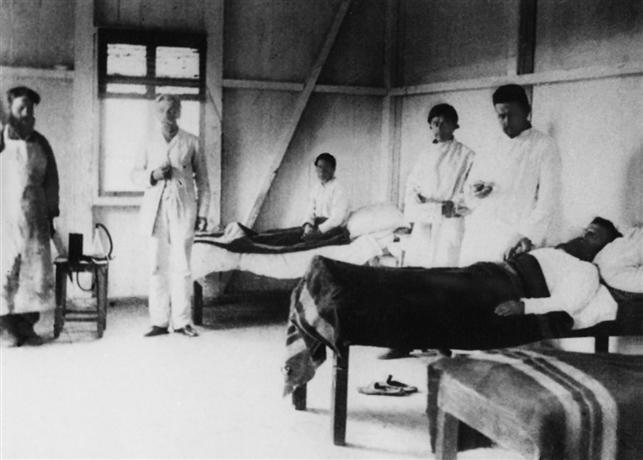
1892 Cholera outbreak in Baku. The sick bay where patients with cholera were treated.

In 1881, the cholera bacterium spread both East and West, and eventually reached Europe and Latin America. From its endemic origin in the Ganges Delta in West Bengal, there was a virulent outbreak in the Punjab and Lahore in northwest India in the years 1881–82, with a very serious death rate. Other early outbreaks occurred in Korea in 1881, and in Thailand in 1882. The Islamic holy city Mecca (Arabia), with its yearly influx of Muslim pilgrims a notorious transmission hub for cholera, was hit during both these years. Further eastward outbreaks occurred in China (also in 1883), and in Japan, followed by the Philippines in 1882–83. In the following years cholera in Asia hit China in 1888, 1890, and 1895; Japan in 1885, 1886, 1890, 1891, and 1895; Korea in 1888, 1890, 1891, and 1895; and the Philippines in 1888–89.

In 1883 it reached Egypt and in the course of a few months, tens of thousands of victims died. (Seeː 1883 outbreak in Egypt) Further westward cholera outbreaks occurred in April 1884 in the naval base Toulon, France, with smaller outbreaks in Marseille, Paris, and other cities, affecting 10,000 people all over France. In 1885, some of the same areas were again infected. Italian migrant workers brought cholera from France to Italy, with a serious outbreak in the city of Naples in August–September 1884. There were minor outbreaks in Italy in 1886–87 without causing epidemics. The outbreak provoked a poisoning "phobia" directed primarily against Gypsies.

The pandemic also spread to Spain, with a minor outbreak starting in Alicante on the Mediterranean coast. But with a more virulent one at the end of 1885, with 160,000 cases and about 60,000 deaths. In 1890 there was another smaller outbreak. According to The New York Times in 1890, cholera had swept away about 120,000 of the inhabitants in the country. Quarantine measures for ships and immigrants based on the findings of the British physician, John Snow, prevented cholera outbreaks in Great Britain and the United States. However, the disease reached Latin America with serious outbreaks in 1886 (Argentina), 1887 (Chile), and 1888 (Argentina and Chile).

The pandemic reappeared in 1891 and originated in Bengal when 60,000 Hindu pilgrims arrived at a small village to celebrate a bathing festival unknown to the authorities (most likely the annual Makar Sankranti bath at Gangasagar Mela). The pilgrims caused new immense cholera outbreaks in northern India during 1891, with more than 580,000 cholera deaths in Assam, Bengal, and Uttar Pradesh. The disease continued westward in 1892, across the Punjab (with 75,000 cholera deaths), and raged on through Afghanistan and claimed 60,000 lives in Persia, and then reached Imperial Russia which suffered a staggering morbidity rate, exacerbated by the Russian famine of 1891–1892. Cholera's penetration in Russia began at Baku, a port on the Caspian Sea. The disease spread upstream along the Volga to reach Moscow and St. Petersburg, where morbidity was relatively minor. The official death toll for 1892 was 300,321. The epidemic faded during the winter and 42,250 cholera deaths were recorded in 1893.

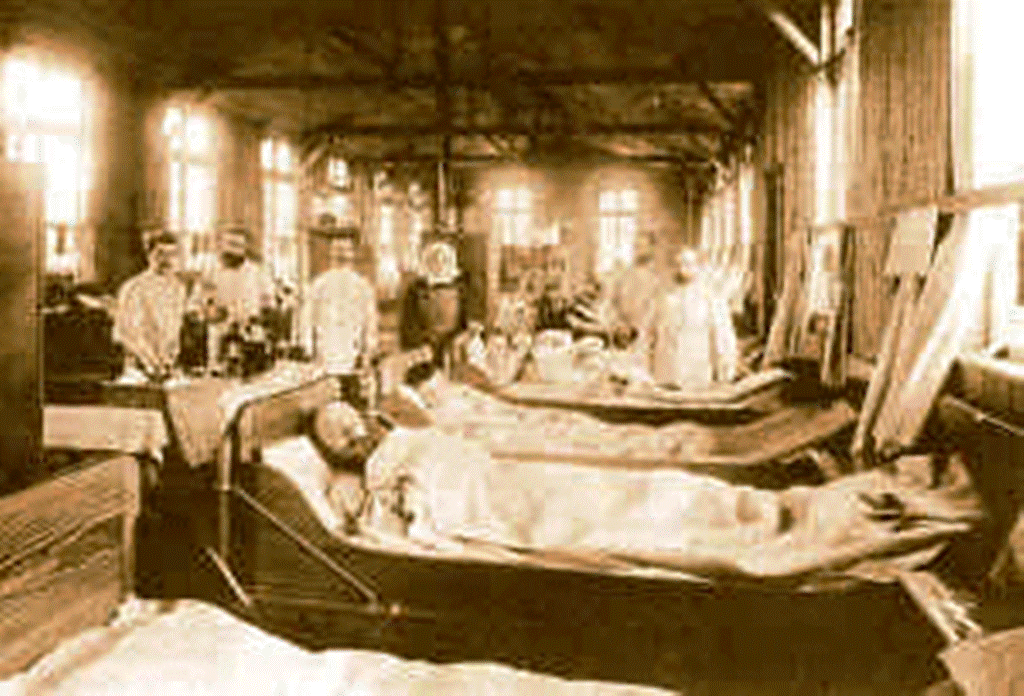
1892 Cholera outbreak in Hamburg, Germany, hospital ward

The busy ports of Hamburg in Germany (Seeː 1892 outbreak in Hamburg), and New York City, the main exit and entry points for cross Atlantic emigration from Europe to the United States, were hit by serious cholera outbreaks in 1892. New York, the busiest port of the U.S. was hit by a combination of typhus fever and cholera in 1892 through Hamburg. The main source of those epidemics were East European Jews, mainly from Imperial Russia, that tried to escape the appalling conditions, the 1891–1892 famine, and antisemitic restrictions (such as the expulsion of Jews from Moscow early in 1892) in their home country.

In Europe in 1892, the disease was alo prevalent in France. Germany and France were reinfected in 1893–94 but outbreaks did not reach epidemic levels. Latin America again suffered attacks several times in the 1890s. Brazil was hit with cholera in 1893–95, mainly along the railway in the Paraíba Valley, through ships carrying immigrants from Europe, Argentina in 1894–95, and Uruguay in 1895. The pandemic also reached the African continent, with outbreaks in 1893 (Tripolitania, Tunisia, Algeria, Morocco, and French West Africa), 1894 (Sudan, Tripolitania, and French West Africa), 1895 (Morocco and Egypt), and 1896 (Egypt).

In August 1895, the cholera outbreak reached the Sandwich Islands.

In the following years there were no new cholera outbreaks, but in 1899 it broke out again in many regions, leading to the 1899–1923 cholera pandemic.

=== 1883 outbreak in Egypt ===
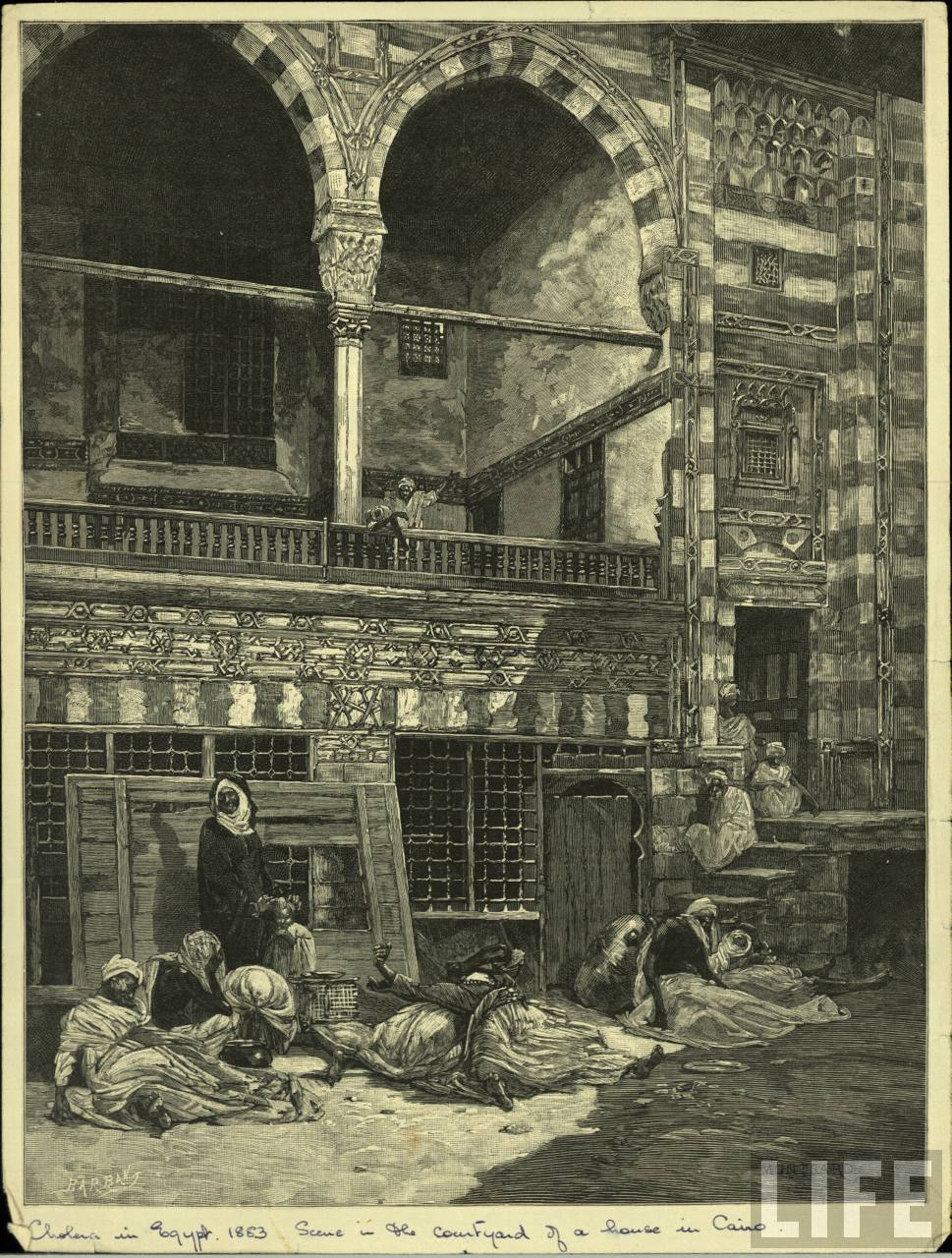
Egyptː 1883 Cholera epidemic in Cairo

In late June 1883, the first cases of cholera in Egypt, recently occupied by the British Empire in 1882, occurred in the port city of Damietta on the Mediterranean coast and rapidly spread in the Nile Delta and throughout the country in the summer and autumn, "notwithstanding cordons maintained with a degree of severity and cruelty almost unexampled". In the course of a few months, according to different estimates between 50,000 and 60,000 people died. The sources of the contamination most likely were Muslim pilgrims returning from Mecca and Indian troops serving in the British army. French and German bacteriologists were sent to Alexandria in 1883 to study the disease and determine its cause. (See: Scientific advances)

The approach of the British administration in Egypt was determined more by concerns that trade out of Indian ports towards Britain risked to be quarantined, as well as economic concerns about spending on public health. The rapid spread of the disease and the perceived incompetence of the population were used to justify British control of Egypt, despite that Egypt's established pre-colonial national health system had been talked about with appreciation by European observers. However, the imposed anti-contagionist policies by the British administration, favouring British shareholders in Egyptian and Indian companies and shipping lines, contributed to the lack of effective measures to combat the 1883 epidemic. Containing the epidemic was further complicated by European prejudices influenced by Orientalism that discredited the understanding by "Orientals" of health, science, and hygiene.

=== 1892 outbreak in Hamburg ===
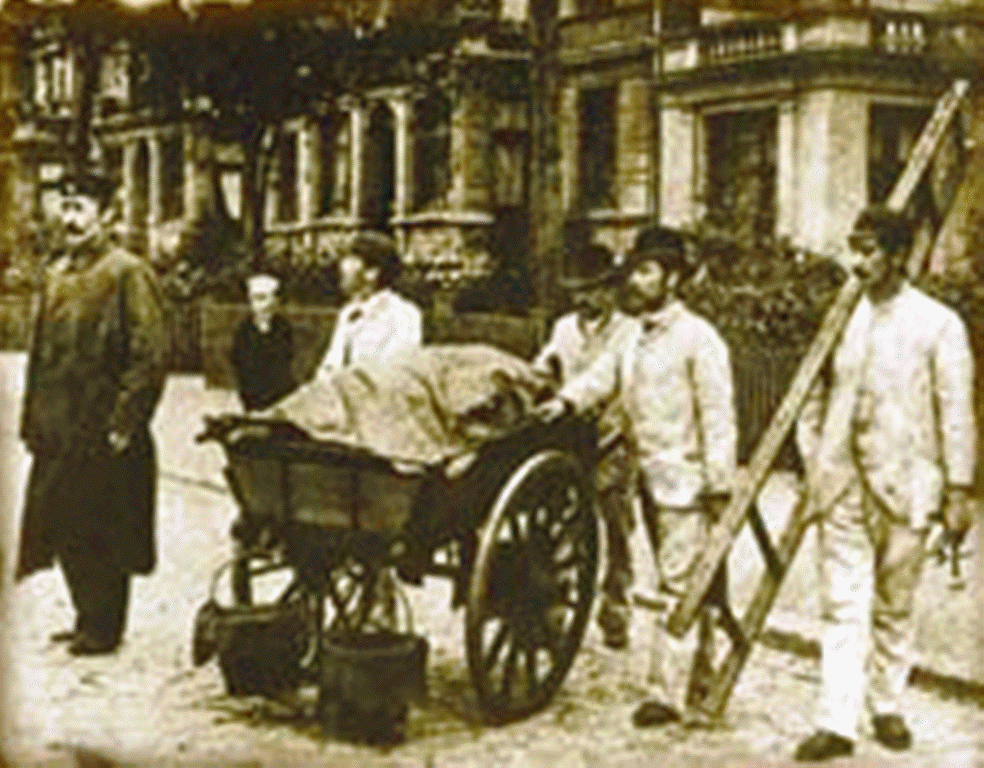
1892 Cholera outbreak in Hamburg, Germany, disinfection team

From mid-August to mid-September 1892 the city of Hamburg, Germany, was hit by a cholera epidemic. The main source of the outbreak were East European Jews, mainly from Imperial Russia, that were on their way to cross the Atlantic Ocean, trying to escape the appalling conditions, the 1891–1892 famine and cholera epidemic, and antisemitic restrictions (such as the expulsion of Jews from Moscow early in 1892) in their home country. Before they boarded, the emigrants were housed in special barracks, jointly financed by the city and the Hamburg America Line shipping company, that were built in the harbour. Conditions were often inadequate and communal latrines discharged their untreated excrement directly into the Elbe river flowing through the city.

In just two months, 8,594 people died. According to other estimates nearly 10,000 people died and many more suffered the appalling symptoms of the disease. No other city in western Europe was as seriously affected in this wave of the pandemic, with an average of 140 per day. Although at the time it was fiercely contested, the infection of the city's water-supply was the main reason for the rapid spread of the cholera. Of those infected the case-mortality was about 50 per cent. The death rate of Hamburg's total population of more than 600,000 was 1.34 per cent according to the official statistics, but it may have even been higher.

In 1893 violent riots broke out, because the public objected to sanitary officers trying to enforce regulations for the prevention of spread of the disease. The crowd beat to death a sanitary officer and one of the policemen sent to protect them. Troops were called out and dispersed the crowd with fixed bayonets.

American author Mark Twain visited Hamburg during the outbreak. In a piece dated 1891–1892, he points out the insufficient information in local newspapers about the outbreak, particularly regarding death figures. Twain criticizes how impoverished individuals were forcefully moved to pest houses where many perished unrecognized and unceremoniously buried. Twain said that people were "snatched from their homes to the pest houses", where "a good many of them ... die unknown and are buried so". He expresses disappointment at the global, and specifically American, lack of awareness concerning cholera.

=== 1877–1896 outbreaks in Tokyo ===
By the late 19th century, Japanese officials were aware of the connection between contaminated water and the spread of cholera, and many groundwater quality tests were executed in Tokyo beginning in 1874. However, due to insufficient tax revenue and a lack of funding from the central government, Tokyo was unable to undertake waste management or water supply modernization. Instead, officials imposed sanitation and quarantine policies on citizens as a means of controlling the disease. During the outbreak in 1886, police were given the authority to fine citizens who were not complying with infected waste disposal protocols. Although for most of this period local police that oversaw cholera regulations and disinfection, with the founding of the Office of Cholera Prevention (Korera Yobō Jimusho) in 1895, authority switched to the Tokyo Metropolitan Police Department on a national level.

== Scientific advances ==
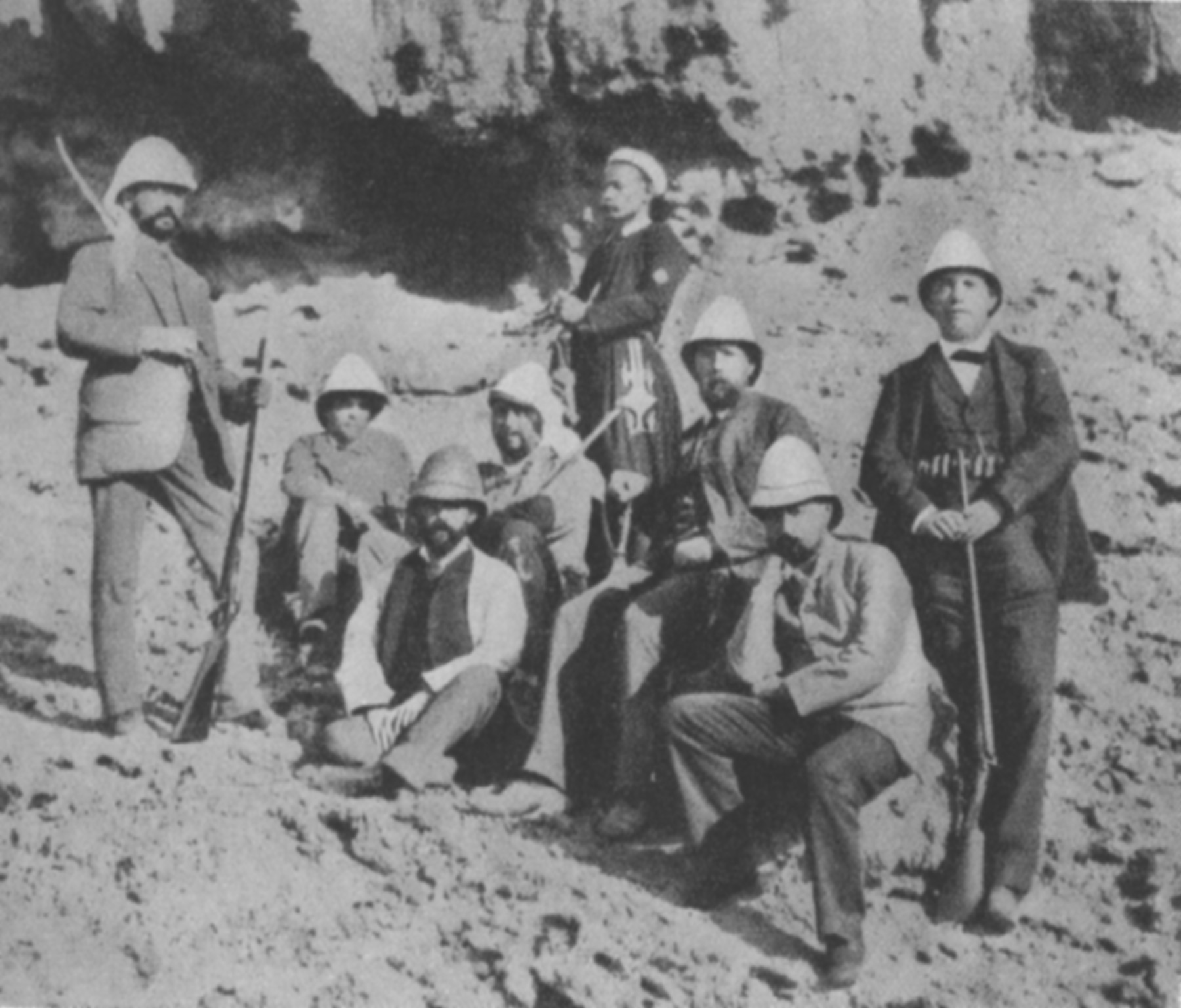
Photograph of Koch (third from the right) and other members of the German Cholera Commission in Egypt, 1884

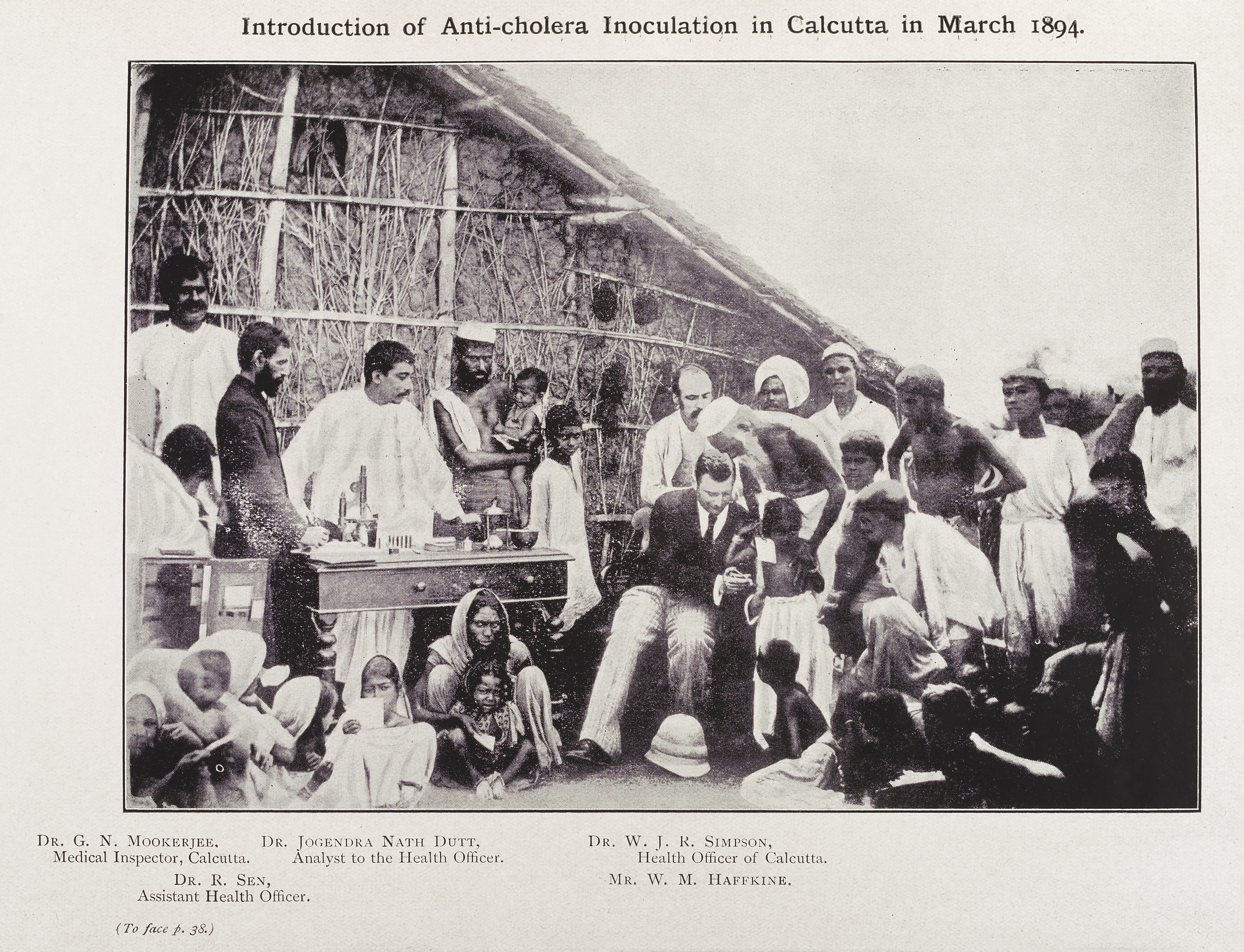
Haffkine during anti-cholera vaccination in Calcutta, March 1894

French and German bacteriologists were sent to Alexandria, Egypt in 1883 to study the cholera epidemic and determine its cause. In August 1883, the German government sent a medical team led by Robert Koch. As the outbreak in Egypt declined, he was transferred to Calcutta (now Kolkata) India, where there was a more severe outbreak. He soon found that the river Ganges was the source of cholera. He performed autopsies of almost 100 bodies, and found in each bacterial infection. He identified the same bacteria from water tanks, linking the source of the infection. Koch isolated Vibrio cholerae and proposed postulates to explain how bacteria caused disease. His work helped to establish the germ theory of disease.

Not everyone agreed with Koch's findings. On 20 May 1885, the sixth International Sanitary Conference was convened in Rome by the Italian government following the reappearance of cholera. At the conference, with 28 government delegations present, the British delegation successfully blocked any "theoretical discussion on the etiology of cholera," despite Koch himself being one of the German delegates. Due to the failures in containing the disease, the conference reaffirmed the futility of a cordon sanitaire in the fight against cholera.

Prior to this time, many physicians believed the disease was caused by direct exposure to the products of filth and decay. Koch helped establish that the disease was more specifically contagious and was transmitted by exposure to the feces of an infected person, including through contaminated water supply. Koch's discoveries led to extensive research into water and wastewater treatment. The germ theory of cholera introduced new methods of protection against the disease, such as the use of chemical disinfectants and heat to kill the bacillus (by boiling water, for instance). Better ways of treating patients were also developed to prevent cholera from spreading further.

Waldemar Haffkine, a Russian-French bacteriologist, focused his research on developing a cholera vaccine, and produced an attenuated form of the bacterium. Risking his own life, on 18 July 1892, Haffkine performed the first human test on himself. To definitively test the vaccine, he needed an area where cholera was common to conduct large trials on humans and moved to India in 1894. After Haffkine's experiments in Calcutta showed promising results, he was asked by the owners of tea plantations in Assam to vaccinate their workers.

== See also ==
- Cholera outbreaks and pandemics

== Sources ==
- Aberth, John (2011). Plagues in World History. Lanham, MD: Rowman & Littlefield. ISBN 978-0-7425-5705-5.
- Evans, Richard J. (1987). Death in Hamburg: Society and politics in the cholera years, 1830-1910. Oxford: Clarendon Press. ISBN 0-19-822864-3.
- Hayes, J.N. (2009). The Burdens of Disease: Epidemics and Human Response in Western History. New Brunswick, N.J.: Rutgers University Press. ISBN 978-0-8135-4612-4.
- Johnston, William. “The Shifting Epistemological Foundations of Cholera Control in Japan (1822-1900).” Extrême-Orient Extrême-Occident, no. 37 (2014): 171–96. http://www.jstor.org/stable/24716523.
- Kohn, George C. (2001). Encyclopedia of Plague and Pestilence: From Ancient Times to the Present. New York: Facts on File. ISBN 0-8160-4263-2.
- L. Burns, Susan. “Public Health, Urban Development, and Cholera in Tokyo, Japan, 1877–95.” In Epidemic Urbanism: Contagious Diseases in Global Cities, edited by Mohammad Gharipour and Caitlin DeClercq, 260–70. Intellect, 2021. http://www.jstor.org/stable/j.ctv36xw519.34.
- Markel, Howard (1999). Quarantine! East European Jewish Immigrants and the New York City Epidemics of 1892. Baltimore, MD: Johns Hopkins University Press. ISBN 978-0-80186180-2.
- Snowden, Frank M. (1995). Naples in the time of cholera, 1884-1911. Cambridge: Cambridge University Press. ISBN 978-0-585-13106-1.
