= Banca Tiberina =

Former Italian bank

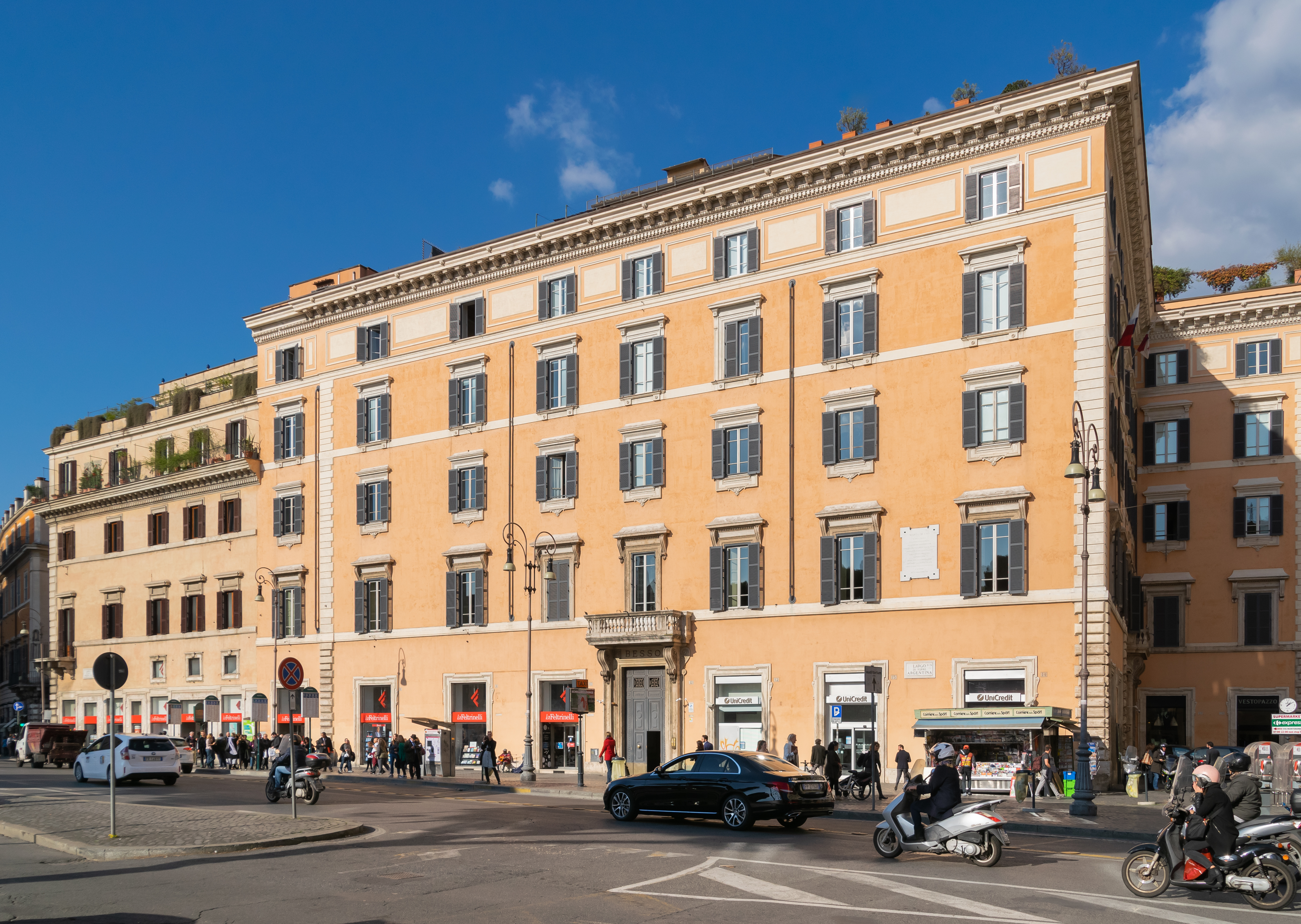
- Former Palazzo Strozzi, now Palasso Besso in Rome, Roman seat of Banca Tiberina from 1886 to 1895
- Company type: Private company
- Industry: Financial services
- Founded: 1877
- Founders: Geisser and Servadio
- Defunct: 1895
- Fate: Liquidated
- Headquarters: Turin, Italy
- Products: Property development loans

The Banca Tiberina (lit. 'Bank of the Tiber') was an Italian credit institution based in Turin, created in 1877. With much of its activity tied to property development, it collapsed in the severe Italian banking crisis of the early 1890s, and was placed into liquidation in 1895.

== History ==
In the 1860s, Swiss banker Ulrich Geisser and Giacomo Servadio built a network of companies that became centered on the Banca Italo-Germanica, which they established in 1871. In the wake of the panic of 1873, however, some of their developments became unviable and needed restructuring.

The Banca Tiberina was established by Geisser and Servadio on 17 May 1877 and absorbed the former operations of the Banca Italo-Germanica. It soon involved itself in ambitious urban development projects, particularly in Turin, Rome, and Naples. In 1884, it purchased the historic Palazzo Strozzi on the northern side of Largo di Torre Argentina, and made it its Roman seat in 1886 following extensive renovation.

With the property downturn of the late 1880s, the bank obtained a credit line of 10 million lire, guaranteed by property assets, from the National Bank of the Kingdom of Italy, but that was not enough to ensure its viability. Geisser was forced to resign from his position of president of the Banca Tiberina. In the end, the bank could not avoid liquidation in the 1890s.

== See also ==
- Credito Mobiliare
- Banca Generale
- Banco di Sconto e Sete
- Banca di Credito Italiano
- Banca di Torino
- List of banks in Italy
