= Banca di Torino =

Former Italian bank

- Company type: Privately held company
- Industry: Financial services
- Founded: June 2, 1871
- Defunct: December 11, 1894
- Fate: Liquidated
- Headquarters: Turin, Italy
- Key people: Giulio Belinzaghi (President)
- Products: Banking services

The Banca di Torino (lit. 'Bank of Turin') was an Italian credit institution based in Turin, created in 1871 and established on Via Santa Teresa 2, It collapsed in the severe Italian banking crisis of the early 1890s, and was eventually liquidated in 1894.

== History ==
The bank was established on 2 June 1871 with a share capital of 10 million lire, divided into 20,000 shares of 500 lire each. The founders included Milanese investors such as former mayor Giulio Belinzaghi, Banca Zaccaria Pisa, Cavajani, Oneto & Co.); and Turinese ones such as the Ceriana brothers and Ulrich Geisser, as well as Swiss consul Oscar Vonwiller and Giacomo Servadio. Geisser became the bank's first president.

The Bank of Turin participated in the foundation of the Banca Generale di Roma, the Banca Italo-Germanica (later restructured as Banca Tiberina), the Banca di Credito Milanese, the Banca Italo-Svizzera and the Banca Industriale e Commerciale di Bologna. It was also involved in more local ventures including the Banca di Savona and the Banca di Mondovì, as well as the specialized Società Italiana di lavori pubblici.

In the 1880s, the bank participated in property development and speculation including in Milan, Naples, Rome, and Turin itself. The real estate downturn of the late 1880s left the Banca di Torino struggling, despite its attempts to diversify its operations to transportation and manufacturing. It was eventually placed into liquidation on 11 December 1894.

== See also ==
- Credito Mobiliare
- Banca Generale
- Banco di Sconto e Sete
- Banca di Credito Italiano
- Banca Tiberina
