= Banca Nazionale Toscana =

Former Italian bank

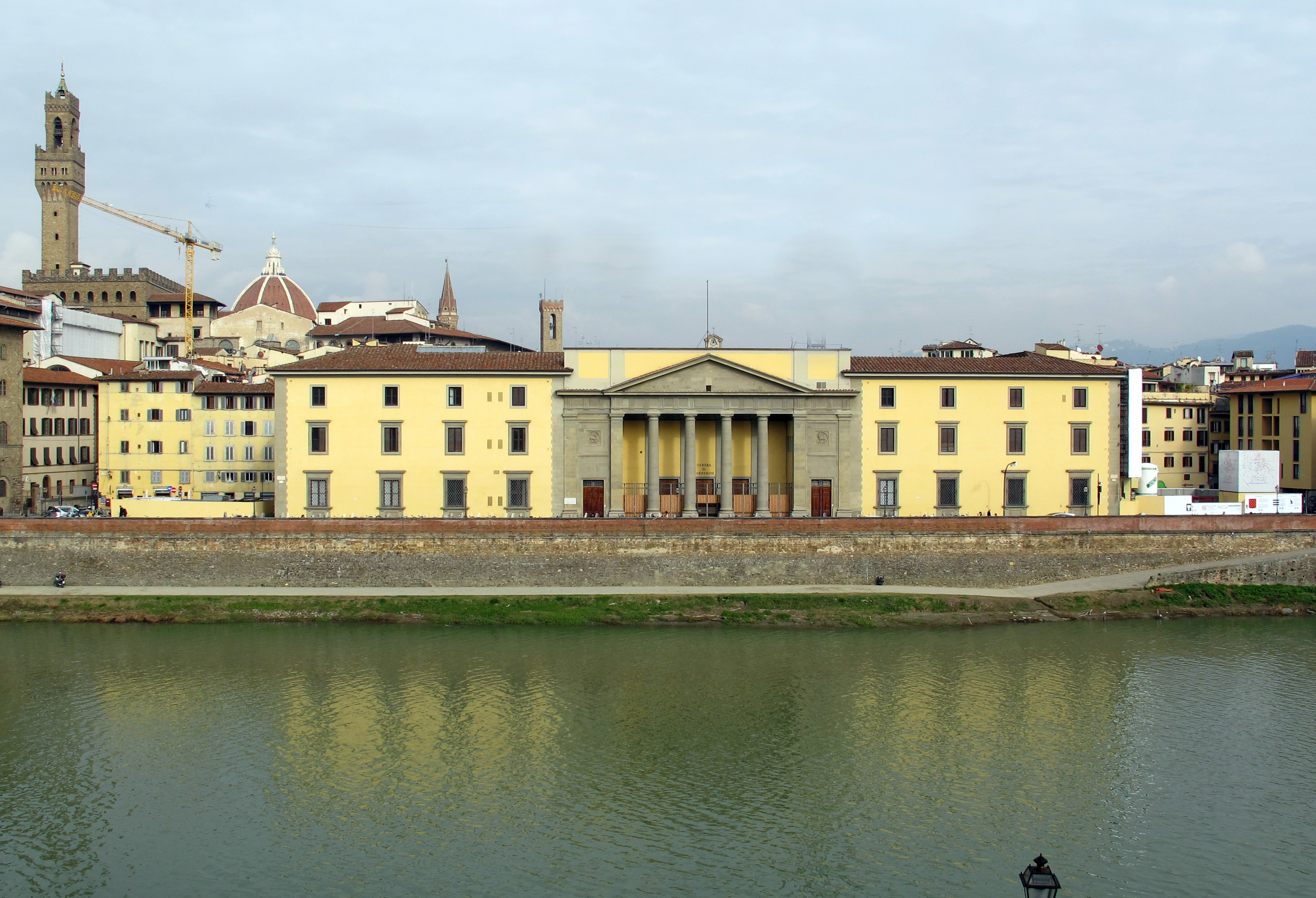
- Palazzo della Borsa in Florence, seat of the Banca Nazionale Toscana (together with the local chamber of commerce and stock exchange) from 1860 to 1893
- Company type: Public company, Bank, Central Bank
- Industry: Financial services
- Founded: 1860; 165 years ago
- Defunct: 1893
- Fate: Merged
- Successor: Bank of Italy
- Headquarters: Florence, Italy
- Area served: Tuscany

The Banca Nazionale Toscana (lit. 'Tuscan National Bank') was a credit institution and bank of issue of the Grand Duchy of Tuscany, founded by merger in 1860. It maintained its activity in the Kingdom of Italy until being merged in 1893 with peers including the National Bank of the Kingdom of Italy, forming the Bank of Italy.

== History ==
Six banks of issue emerged in Tuscany during the first half of the 19th century: the Bank of Florence (est. 1816), the Bank of Livorno (est. 1836), the Bank of Siena (est. 1841), the Bank of Arezzo (est. 1846), the Bank of Pisa (est. 1847), and the Bank of Lucca (est. 1849). The Bank of Florence absorbed the Bank of Livorno merged in 1857, and the four other in 1860, upon which it was renamed the Banca Nazionale Toscana.

After the national unification of 1861, the Banca Nazionale Toscana was one of six remaining Italian banks of issue, together with the Banca Toscana di Credito, Banca Romana, Banco di Napoli, Banco di Sicilia, and National Bank of the Sardinian States. Early attempts by the government to have it merge with the latter failed in the 1860s as they met local opposition in Tuscany.

Starting from 1874, the Banca Nazionale Toscana was part of the mandatory consortium under which each of the six banks were assigned caps on their respective volumes of issuance.

Like other private banks of issue, Banca Nazionale Toscana was listed on the stock exchange. In particular, it was listed on the Milan stock exchange from 1891 to 1894.

== See also ==
- National Bank of the Kingdom of Italy
- List of banks in Italy
