= Banca Romana =

Former Italian bank (1834–1893)

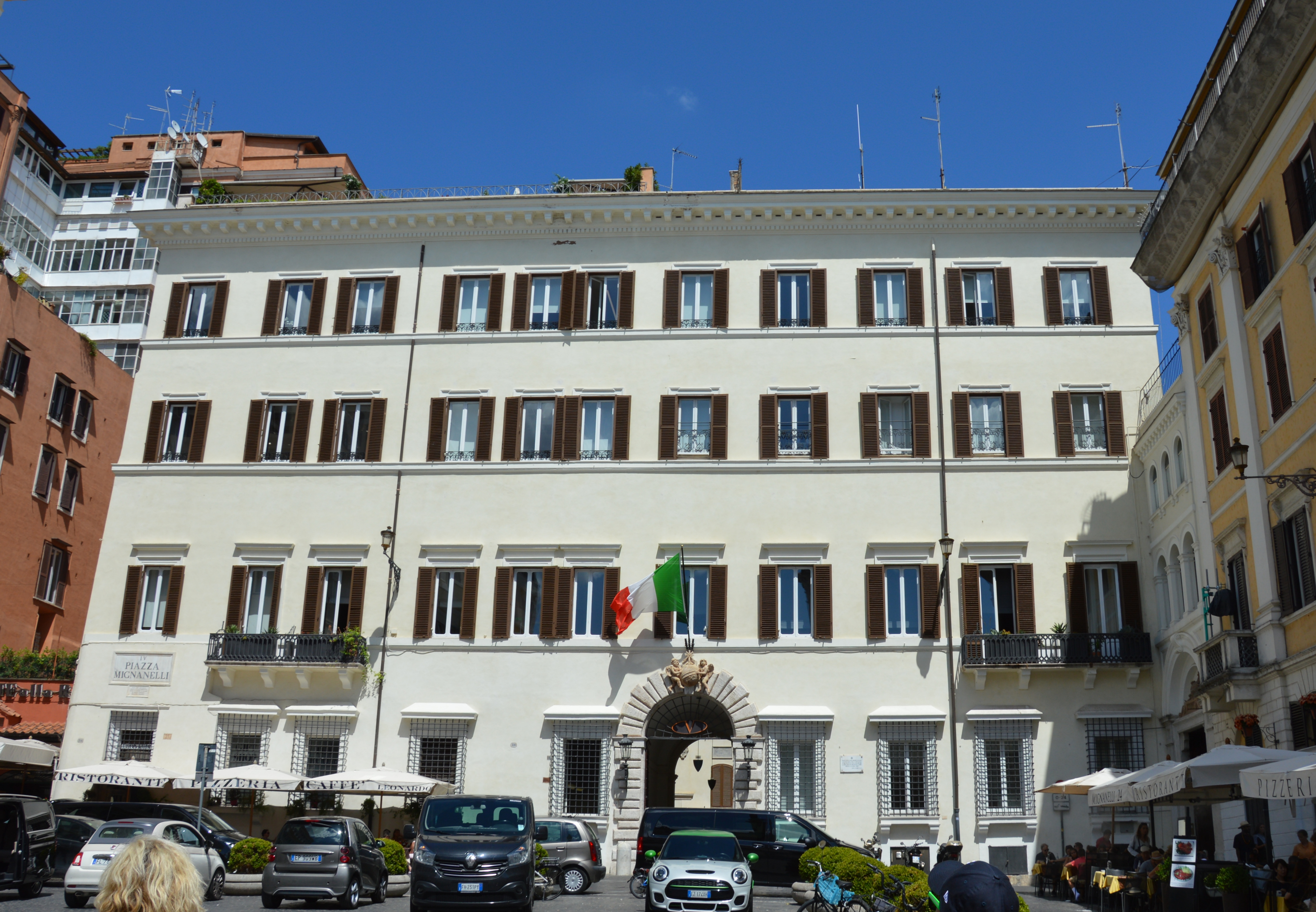
- Palazzo Gabrielli-Mignanelli in Rome, the bank's seat from 1834 to 1865
- Formerly: Bank of the Papal States
- Company type: Bank
- Industry: Financial services
- Founded: 1834
- Founders: French and Belgian investors, with the privilege of issuing money in the Papal States
- Defunct: 1893
- Fate: Liquidated
- Successor: Bank of Italy
- Headquarters: Rome, Italy
- Area served: Papal States

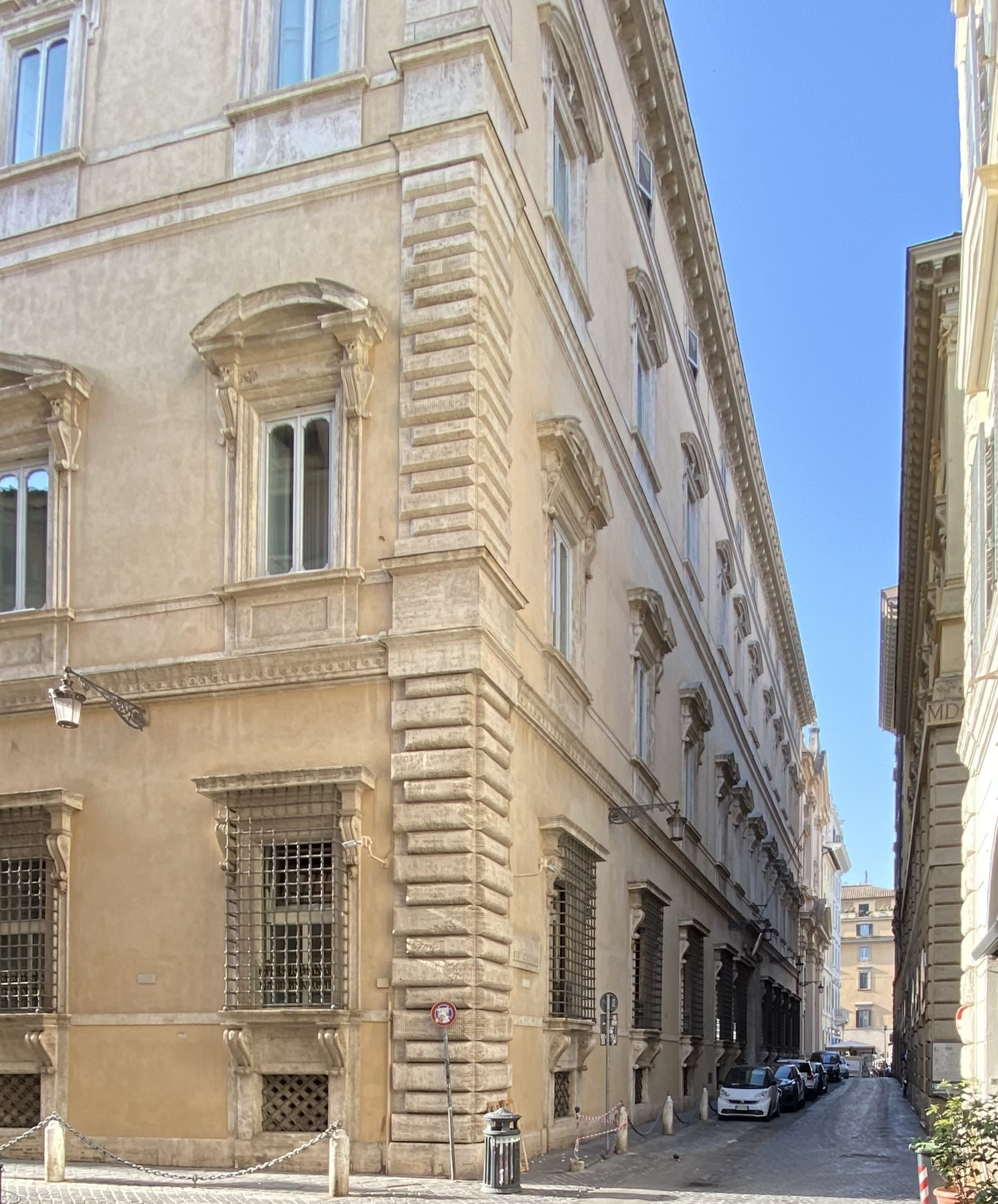
Palazzo Maffei Marescotti, seat of the Bank of the Papal States then the Banca Romana from 1865 to 1893

The Banca Romana (lit. 'Roman Bank') was an Italian bank of issue founded in Rome in 1834. In 1850 it was reorganized as the Bank of the Papal States (Italian: Banca dello Stato Pontificio), which in 1870 itself changed its name to Banca Romana. In the late 1880s, its difficulties developed into the major Banca Romana scandal which shook Italy's political life and triggered the creation in 1893 of the Bank of Italy. The Bank of Italy managed the Banca Romana's subsequent liquidation.

== History ==
=== Banca Romana in the Papal States ===
The Banca Romana was established in Rome in 1834 by French and Belgian investors, with the privilege of issuing money in the Papal States granted by Pope Gregory XVI. In 1841, control of the Bank was acquired by a group of Roman financiers led by the Agostino Feoli with financial support from the Cassa di Risparmio di Roma.

During the political upheavals of 1848, the bank encountered a serious liquidity crisis caused by a bank run. To deal with the crisis, in April 1848, the government ordered the suspension of the convertibility of banknotes and their circulation as legal tender for three months, a measure that was then renewed several times. In order to support public confidence in the value of the banknotes, it was envisaged to guarantee their convertibility into Treasury bonds with a mortgage on ecclesiastical assets. Simultaneously, the bank's issuing privilege was limited to 800,000 scudi.

During the Roman Republic (1849–1850), the Republican government ordered the bank to print currency for 1.5 million scudi in order to finance the public treasury. Subsequently, in December 1849, the Papal Government cancelled these banknotes, but compensated the holders with public debt securities of equal value. At the same time, not wanting to recognize the debt contracted by the Republic, the government expressed its intent to seek compensation from the bank's assets, effectively triggering its bankruptcy given insufficient own funds. In consideration of the systemic repercussions that would be produced, the Papal government eventually backtracked, however, and, as part of an overall restructuring plan, decreed the incorporation of the Banca Romana's remaining assets and liabilities into a newly formed bank of issue.

=== Bank of the Papal States ===
Like the prior Banca Romana, the Bank of the Papal States was founded in 1850 in the form of a joint-stock company. In 1855, given difficulties experienced by the new bank, the convertibility of its banknotes was again suspended, and its branches in Romagna were spun off to form a now bank of issue, the Bank of the Four Legations. With the advance of Italian unification, The latter was absorbed in 1860–1861 by the National Bank of the Sardinian States.

=== Banca Romana in the Kingdom of Italy ===
After the capture of Rome on 20 September 1870, the Bank of the Papal States renamed itself again as Banca Romana. On 24 October 1870, it signed a secret agreement with the National Bank of the Kingdom of Italy (as the National Bank of the Sardinian States had renamed itself in the meantime) under which it renounced the monopoly on money issuance it had in Papal Latium against a significant financial indemnity, which ironically resolved the mounting financial distress that the Papal States had been experiencing in the previous years as an independent polity. As a consequence, the Banca Romana found itself one of six banks of issue in the unified Kingdom of Italy, together with the Banco di Napoli, Banco di Sicilia, Banca Nazionale Toscana, Banca Toscana di Credito, and the National Bank of the Kingdom of Italy.

The Banca Romana scandal, which erupted in December 1892, precipitated the merger of the latter three to form the Bank of Italy in 1893. The Bank of Italy in turn was tasked with liquidating the Banca Romana in an orderly manner. The shareholders of Banca Romana lost their investment, but its creditors were effectively bailed out by the Bank of Italy, which in turn was (only partly) compensated by the government through tax rebates and other financial favors. The notes of Banca Romana remained in circulation until full withdrawal and replacement with Bank of Italy notes in 1896. The liquidation was completed in 1912.

== Leadership ==
- Count Filippo Antonelli, Governor of the Bank of the Papal States, 1852–1870
- Ludovico Guerrini, Governor of the Banca Romana, 1870–1881
- Bernardo Tanlongo, Governor of the Banca Romana, 1881–1893

== See also ==
- Banco di Santo Spirito
- Institute for the Works of Religion
- List of banks in Italy
