= Banco di Sconto e Sete =

Former Italian bank

- Native name: Banco di Sconto e Sete
- Company type: Credit institution
- Industry: Financial services
- Predecessor: Cassa di Sconto di Torino (1853); Banco Sete (1857)
- Founded: 1863
- Defunct: 1892
- Fate: Liquidated; assets absorbed by Società Bancaria Italiana in 1904
- Headquarters: Turin, Italy
- Key people: James de Rothschild (financial supporter)
- Products: Discounting trade bills, silk industry financing, banking services, bonds

The Banco di Sconto e Sete (lit. 'Discount and Silks Bank') was an Italian credit institution based in Turin, created in 1863 by merger of two previous banks, the Cassa di Sconto di Torino (lit. 'Turin Discount Bank', est. 1853) and Banco Sete (lit. 'Bank of Silks', est. 1857). It failed during the Italian banking crisis of the early 1890s and was placed into liquidation in 1892. Its remaining assets and liabilities were eventually absorbed into the Società Bancaria Italiana in 1904.

== History ==
The Casse di Sconto were part of a plan outlined by Cavour to complement the role of the money-issuing National Bank of the Sardinian States with specialized discount banks. The Cassa di Sconto of Turin was established on 30 August 1853, with financial support from the National Bank. Its branch in Genoa became an autonomous affiliate in 1856.

The Cassa di Sconto di Torino started activity with initial capital of one million lire and seat in Palazzo Pallavicino Mossi in Turin, today via Santa Teresa 11. It was authorized to discount trade bills, grant advances against deposits and public and private funds. It could also receive sums in current accounts with and without interest and make collections and payments on behalf of third parties. During 1856, two capital increases were approved which brought the capital to 8 million lire; a statutory change in 1857 expanded its scope by allowing it to own shares in commercial enterprises.

In 1856-1857, the Banco Sete was established by a group of partners including Pietro Brambilla, the Ceriana brothers, Gustavo De Fernex, Vincenzo Denina, Vincenzo Luciano, Giuseppe Duprè, Gilberto Dumontel, Giuseppe Fontana, G. Paolo Laclaire, Carlo Ogliani, Agostino Plutino, Costantino Soldati, and Felice Genero. The Banco Sete concentrated on financing the silk industry, made advances against raw and processed silks, and granted financing to twisters and spinners, furthermore it was authorized to hold current accounts and issue bonds.

On 20 May 1863, the Cassa di Sconto di Torino, which had survived the turbulence of the years 1859-1862 thanks to prudent management, merged with the Banco Sete to form the Banco di Sconto e Sete with support from French financier James de Rothschild. In 1883, the bank moved from Palazzo Pallavicino Mossi to the nearby Palazzo Lascaris, but had to sell the latter in 1887 under financial stress.

== See also ==
- Credito Mobiliare
- Banca Generale
- Banca Tiberina
- Banca di Credito Italiano
- List of banks in Italy
