= Bank of Savoy =

Former bank in Annecy

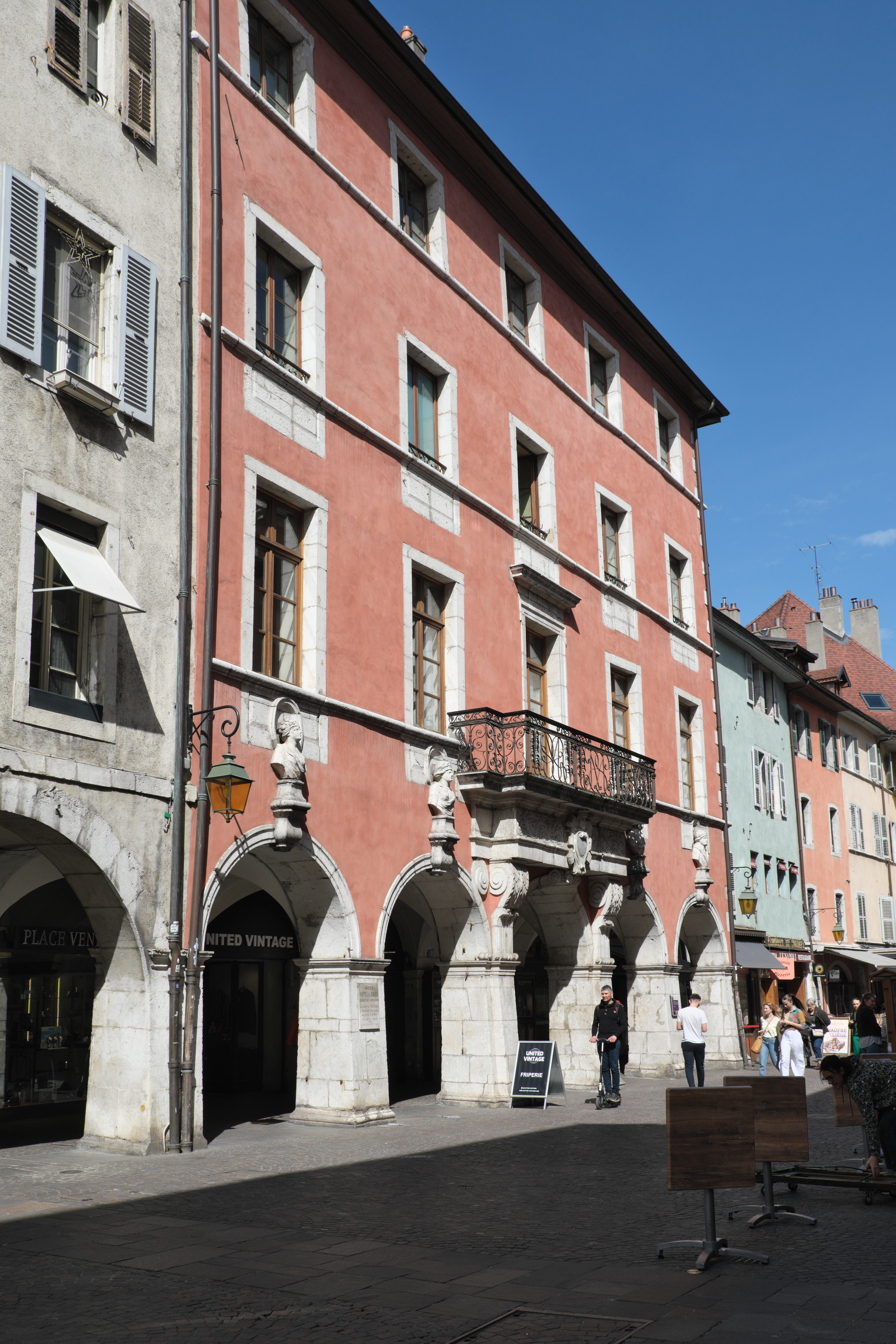
- Hôtel de Sales in Annecy, former seat of the Bank of Savoy
- Company type: S.A. (corporation)
- Industry: Financial services
- Founded: 1851
- Founder: Savoyard state
- Defunct: 1865
- Fate: Ceded control
- Successor: Bank of France
- Headquarters: Annecy, Savoyard state
- Products: Bank of issue, money issuing
- Owner: Kingdom of Sardinia

The Bank of Savoy (French: Banque de Savoie, also referred to under that name in Italian) was a bank of issue of the Kingdom of Sardinia, established in 1851 and based in Annecy and Chambéry. As a consequence of France's annexation of the former Duchy of Savoy under the Treaty of Turin (1860), the Bank of Savoy ceded its money-issuance role to the Bank of France in 1865.

== History ==
=== Kingdom of Sardinia ===
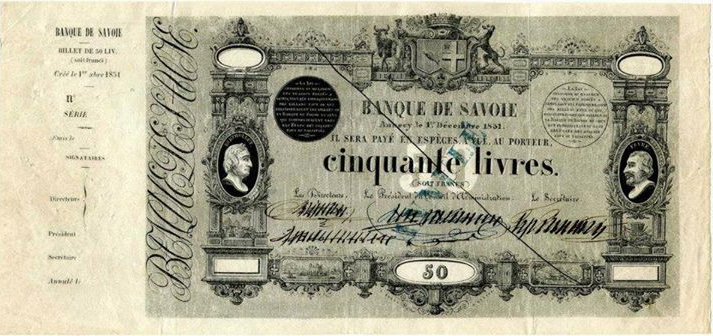
A banknote issue by the Bank of Savoy in the 1850s

The Bank of Savoy was established by Sardinian Royal Law of 26 April 1851, succeeding the Banque d'Annecy which had been created by royal edict of 18 April 1840. It was the kingdom's second bank of issue following the establishment two years earlier of the National Bank in the Sardinian States. Its territorial scope was focused on the former Duchy of Savoy, with principal seat in Annecy and a secondary seat (or branch office) in Chambéry, and it received the privilege to mint coins and issue paper money with legal tender status in Savoy. Its head office building in Annecy was the Hôtel de Sales, a historic building erected in the late 1680s.

The Bank of Savoy had an initial capital of 800,000 liras, raised to 1.6 million liras in 1853, 2 million in 1856, and eventually 4 million in 1860. Scipion Ruphy was the chairman of its board of directors throughout its existence.

=== French annexation and controversy ===
Following the annexation of Savoy to France in 1860, the monetary role of the Bank of Savoy became a matter of controversy known as "l'affaire de la Banque de Savoie".

A convention of 23 August 1860 between France and Sardinia stipulated that the bank's issuance privilege would be maintained, but did not specify how that extension would sit with the monopoly on French money issuance that had been granted to the Bank of France in 1848. Finance Minister Pierre Magne appointed a committee to resolve the matter, chaired by jurist Adolphe Vuitry, which recommended that the Bank of France should buy out the Bank of Savoy's issuance privilege for 1.2 million francs. Ruphy, however, rejected this price as unacceptably low, and in late 1861 signaled that the Bank of Savoy might compete with the Bank of France over all French territory.

In September 1863, the Bank of Savoy made an agreement with the Pereire brothers according to which the latter would subscribe to a capital increase that would grant them equity control. Shortly afterwards, the bank's general assembly resolved on 4 October 1863 to implement Ruphy's earlier threat of nationwide competition with the Bank of France, which the Pereires supported on the argument that it would stimulate the French economy through improved credit allocation. In a further twist, Ruphy leveraged this situation to negotiate a higher price of 4 million francs for the Bank of France's issuance privilege buy-out, triggering a court fight with the Pereires until Émile Pereire eventually gave up in 1864 given the government's evident lack of support of his stance. The episode cemented the antagonism between the Pereires and the Bank of France, which played a key role in the two brothers' loss of control of the Crédit Mobilier a few years later.

=== Later developments ===
On 19 November 1864, the Bank of Savoy and the Bank of France concluded an agreement that the former's two locations would become the latter's respective branches in Annecy and Chambéry upon transfer of the issuance privilege. The Bank of France could then buy out the Bank of Savoy's issuance privilege as negotiated with Ruphy, securing the French government's assent by imperial order of 8 April 1865. The Bank of Savoy was consequently wound up, with its non-issuance-related business taken over by the Comptoir général d'escompte d'Annecy, a new entity established for that purpose. The latter was led by François Bétrix, previously the Bank of Savoy's general manager.

During the financial turmoil of the early 1880s, the Comptoir général d'escompte d'Annecy, by then led by François Bétrix's son Jules and operating as J. Bétrix & Cie, underwent distress and was succeeded by a new venture, Frossard & Cie - Banque commerciale d’Annecy on 23 March 1881. In 1896 Léon Laydernier, by then the bank's manager, had it renamed in 1896 as Banque commerciale d'Annecy Laydernier & Cie, later shortened to Banque Laydernier, which in the course of the 20th century was successively acquired by Crédit Lyonnais then Crédit du Nord, now part of Société Générale.

== Namesakes ==
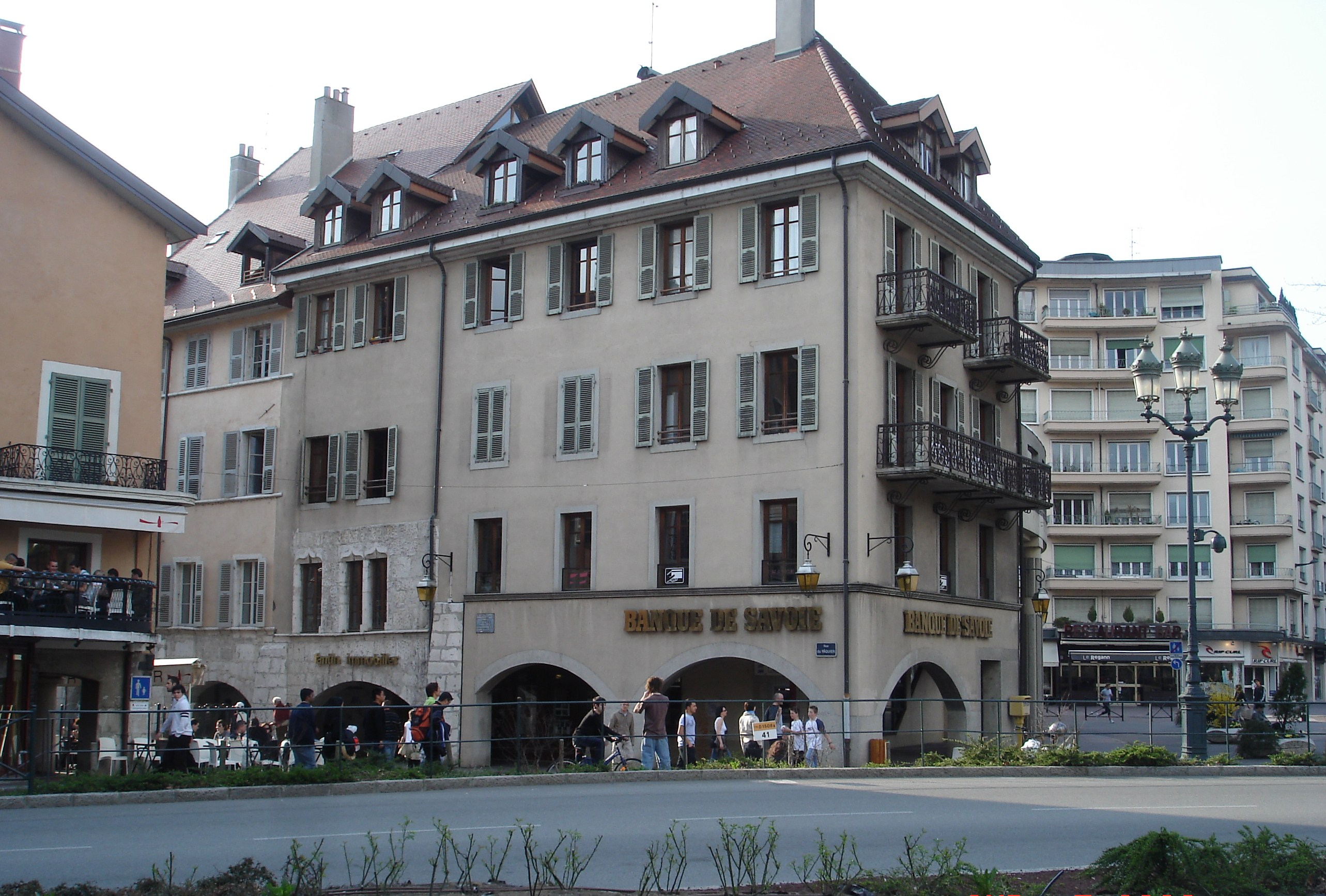
Branch of the 20th-century Banque de Savoie in Annecy

An unrelated family-owned Banque de Savoie was created in 1912 in Chambéry, absorbed by the Crédit Commercial de France in 1993, and eventually acquired by Groupe Banque Populaire in 2008. As of 2024, it is part of Groupe BPCE but keeps operating under the Banque de Savoie brand.

Another bank named Savoy Bank was created in New York in 2008, and eventually acquired by Hanover Bancorp in 2021.

== See also ==
- National Bank of the Kingdom of Italy
- List of banks in France
