= Banques départementales =

Former French banks of issue

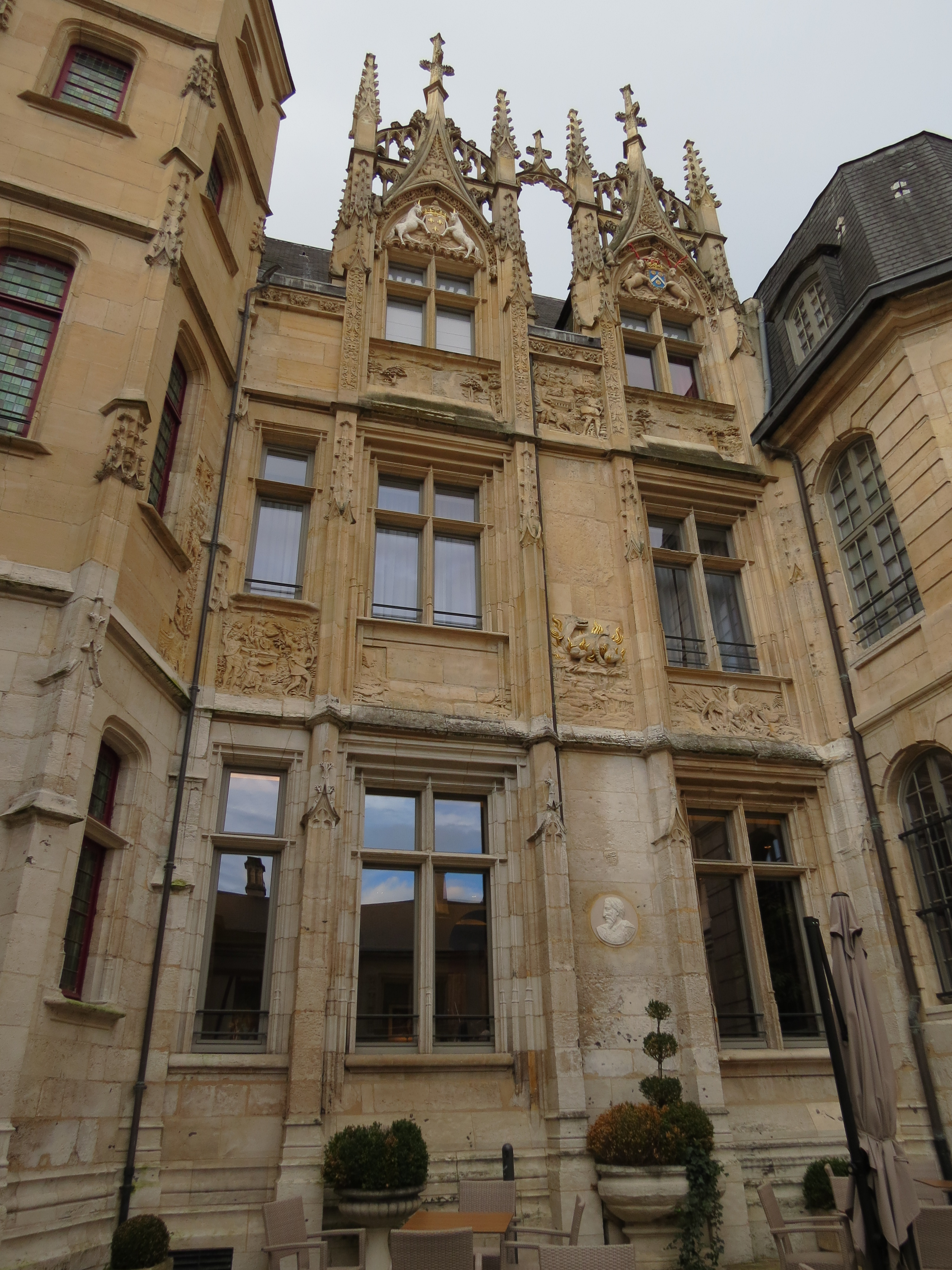
Hôtel de Bourgtheroulde, former head office of the Banque de Rouen

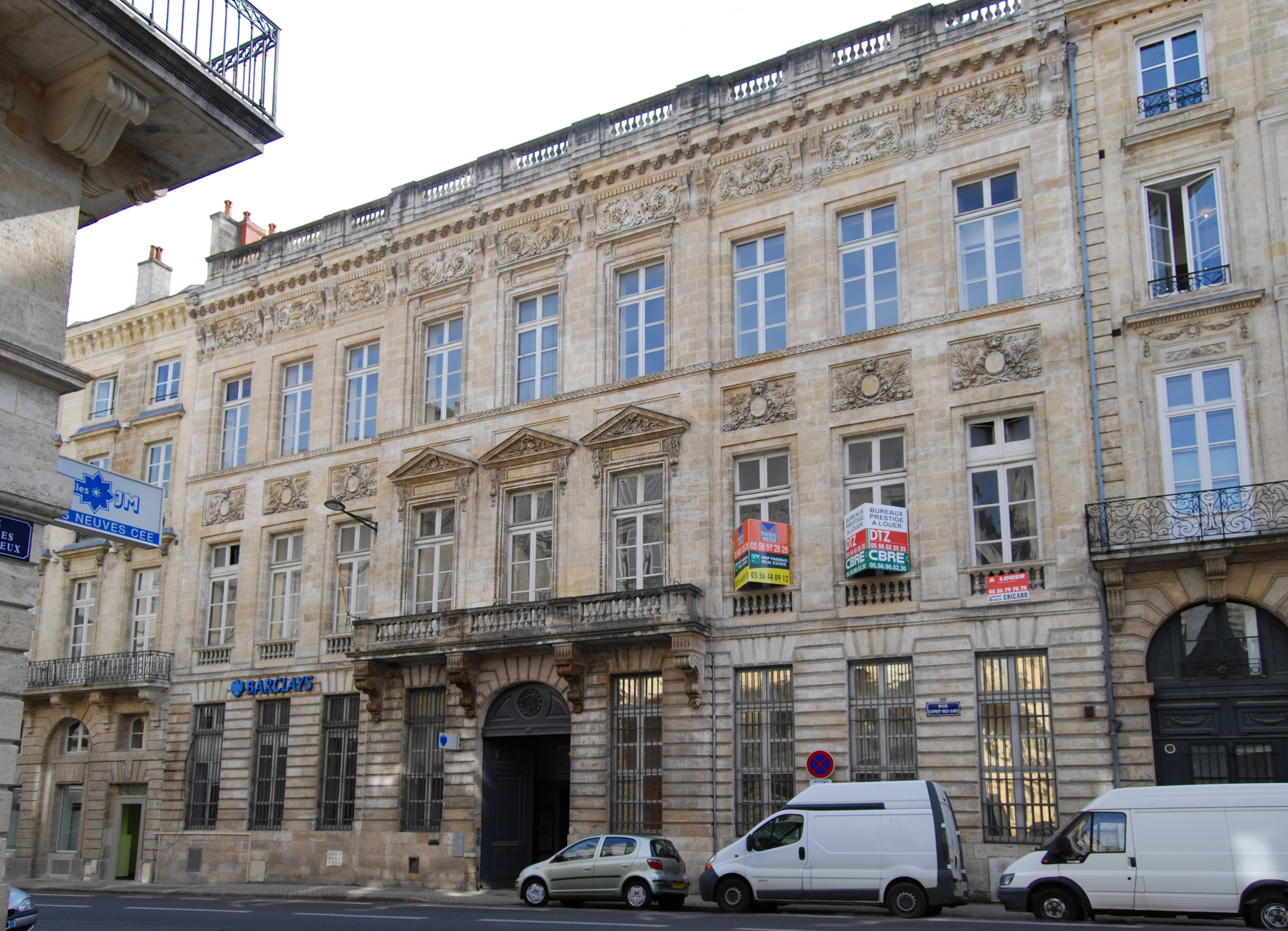
Hôtel Piganeau on 4 rue Esprit-des-Lois, head office of the Banque de Bordeaux between 1818 and 1848

The banques départementales were joint-stock banks of issue that were created in major secondary trade hubs of France in the early 19th century, echoing the role that the Bank of France played in and around Paris. They were key components of the French financial system during the Bourbon Restoration and July Monarchy.

There were two waves of creation of banques départementales, with three established in the late 1810s immediately after the restoration, and six more in the late 1830s during the heyday of the July Monarchy. All nine banques départementales were wiped out in the financial crisis of early 1848, paving the way for the Bank of France to be granted a national monopoly on note issuance later that year.

== Overview ==
At its creation in 1800, the Bank of France's geographical scope of activity was limited to Paris and its immediate surroundings. It relied on a network of around 150 correspondents in the rest of the Empire, which collected bills payable in their respective localities. Between 1808 and 1810, Napoleon requested that the Bank of France also opened discount counters (French: comptoirs d'escompte) in other cities, which the bank did in Lyon, Rouen, and Lille, albeit reluctantly. These ventures, however, were soon wound up between 1813 and 1817.

Banques départementales were not established in all departments of France but only in the country's major commercial centers, namely Rouen (by ordinance of 7 May 1817 and on the initiative of local merchants wishing to revive the advantages of the short-lived local comptoir d'escompte), Nantes (11 March 1818), Bordeaux (23 November 1818), Lyon (29 June 1835), Marseille (27 September 1835), Lille (25 June 1836), Le Havre (25 August 1837), Toulouse (11 June 1838), and Orléans (8 November 1838). Similar projects were considered in Dijon in 1839, and in Strasbourg in 1843–1844, but failed to come to fruition. Incorporated as joint-stock companies (sociétés anonymes), the banks' activity was to discount commercial paper and to issue banknotes, for which each of them was granted a local time-limited monopoly by special legislation, as the Bank of France had in Paris.

Until the mid-1830s, the Bank of France had not opposed the banques départementales, but in 1836 it started establishing its own competing local comptoirs, of which it had fourteen by early 1848. It also lobbied the French government in favor of a nationwide expansion of its issuance privilege, arguing that it was the only bank with the financial strength to support the national treasury in the event of a crisis. These arguments met pushback from provincial interests that denounced the Bank of France as merely the "Bank of Paris", but were vindicated in the national financial crisis triggered by the French Revolution of February 1848, when the government's decision to suspend convertibility of all banknotes led to distress of the banks outside Paris. The Second Republic's decrees of 27 April and 2 May 1848 consequently mandated the absorption of the banques départementales and their staff into the Bank of France, for which they became local branches. Not all were insolvent, however, and in the case of Rouen, the terms of acquisition allowed the local shareholders to make a profit.

== See also ==
- Banque Rothschild
- Comptoir d'Escompte
- National Banks in Meiji Japan
- List of banks in France
