= Bank of issue =

Type of financial institution

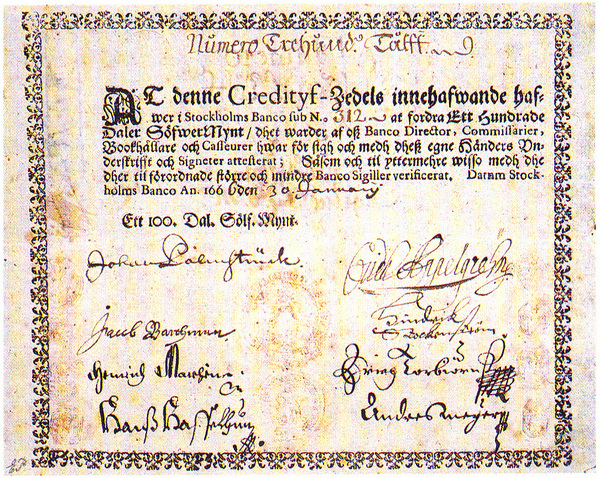
Banknote of one hundred daler issued by Stockholms Banco, 1666

A bank of issue, also referred to as a note-issuing bank or issuing authority, is a financial institution that issues banknotes.

The short-lived Stockholms Banco (1657–1667) printed notes from 1661 onwards and is generally viewed as the first-ever bank of issue. Banks of issue are thus a more recent creation than transfer or giro banks, which create money in accounts on a ledger, the oldest recorded being the Taula de canvi de Barcelona established in 1401.

In many countries and particularly during the 19th century, several banks were authorized to issue notes that had simultaneous status as legal tender. The authorization, often referred to as the issuance privilege, was generally granted by the government on a bank-specific basis and for a limited period of time. During the 20th century, the role of bank of issue has been increasingly assumed by central banks in their respective territorial jurisdictions. In the 21st century, "bank of issue" and "central bank" have become essentially synonymous except in a few special cases such as Hong Kong, Northern Ireland, and Scotland.

== 19th century ==
Several European countries went through periods during which multiple banks of issue coexisted and had their banknotes simultaneously recognized as legal tender. Such experiences do not count as free banking, however, because banks typically needed to receive a specific issuance privilege from the government to be able to issue notes. Some banks incorporated that privilege into their name and brand identity, for example the Privileged Austrian National Bank (est. 1816), Privileged Bank of Epirothessaly (est. 1882), or Privileged National Bank of the Kingdom of Serbia (est. 1884).

In Great Britain, country banks that issued banknotes multiplied in the 18th century, even though the Bank of England had a monopoly on note issuance in London and its immediate surroundings. The Bank Charter Act 1844 established a nationwide note-issuance monopoly for the Bank of England in England and Wales, but not in Scotland or Ireland.

In France, the Bank of France's note issuance was originally focused on Paris and its region, and several other note-issuing banks known as banques départementales were established in the early 19th century in commercial hubs such as Bordeaux, Marseille or Rouen. The banques départementales were wiped out in the financial crisis associated with the French Revolution of 1848, which resulted in the widening of the Bank of France's note-issuance monopoly to the entire country. Following the Treaty of Turin (1860), the Bank of Savoy briefly found itself a second bank of issue in France, and the Pereire brothers attempted to take advantage of this situation to compete with the Bank of France, but their bid failed in 1864 and played a role in the subsequent demise of their main financial venture the Crédit Mobilier.

In the German Confederation, the first banks of issue were chartered by individual states in the Vormärz period. Not including Austria, there were nine such Notenbanken by 1851. These were not the only issuers of paper money, however, since most German states (with the only exceptions of Lippe and the Hanseatic cities of Bremen, Hamburg and Lübeck) also issued government notes without the intermediation of a bank. By 1870, the number of banks of issue had grown to 31 in the territories that would soon become the German Reich.

Banks of issue were similarly chartered by individual Italian states. In the early decades following Italian unification, the National Bank of the Kingdom of Italy coexisted with five other banks of issue inherited from that pre-unification history, namely the Banca Nazionale Toscana, Banca Toscana di Credito, Banca Romana, Banco di Napoli, and Banco di Sicilia. In 1893, following the Banca Romana scandal, the Bank of Italy was formed by merger to become the country's dominant bank of issue, but the Banco di Napoli and Banco di Sicilia both remained separate and retained an issuance role until 1926.

In Japan, multiple banks of issue coexisted during a brief period under the leadership of statesman Ōkubo Toshimichi in the early Meiji era, starting with the First National Bank or Dai-Ichi Bank established in 1873 by Shibusawa Eiichi. Around 150 such national banks were created by the late 1870s, some of which survive (often following mergers). In the 1880s, however, Ōkubo's successor Matsukata Masayoshi led the establishment of the Bank of Japan and the subsequent phasing out of the national banks' note-issuance privilege, a process which was completed in the 1890s.

19th-century banks of issue in Europe were most often private-sector entities, albeit typically under hands-on government oversight. That was the case of most mid-century German private banks of issue except the Bank of Bremen and Frankfurter Bank, which were comparatively independent, and the Bank of Prussia, which had the Prussian government as a minority shareholder. In the Russian Empire, government-owned banks of issue in Saint Petersburg - successively the Assignation Bank, State Commercial Bank and State Bank - coexisted with the Bank of Finland and, for a brief period between 1828 and 1841, the Bank Polski.

Most 19th-century banks in the United States until 1863 were banks of issue, even though the term is infrequent in U.S. financial historiography because of the ubiquity of the practice. The U.S. is also special in having established a viable system of government notes (i.e. paper money directly issued by the government) with the National Bank Act of 1863, in contrast with most other countries where government notes (as opposed to banknotes issued by banks) was typically associated with monetary instability, as had been the case with French assignats in the 1790s. In the Ottoman Empire, nonconvertible government notes known as kaime coexisted at times with the higher-quality banknotes of the Imperial Ottoman Bank.

== Colonial and quasi-colonial banks of issue ==
Bas-relief at the entrance of the former head office of Banco Nacional Ultramarino in Lisbon, emphasizing its role as overseas bank of issue (Portuguese: banco emissor no ultramar) in Portuguese colonies

In European colonial empires as well as the Japanese colonial empire, dedicated banks of issue were established to provide currency (and also often credit) in the overseas territories without interfering with monetary and financial stability at home. Prominent colonial banks of issue included the Bank of Java (est. 1828), Banque de l'Algérie (est. 1851), Banco Nacional Ultramarino (est. 1864), Banque de l'Indochine (est. 1875), Bank of Taiwan (est. 1899), Banque du Congo Belge (est. 1909), Bank of Chōsen (est. 1911), and Banco de Angola (est. 1926). Depending on available communication technologies and on specific situations, the head office of these banks was either in the home country or in the colony itself, occasionally moving in one or the other direction: for example, the seat of the Banque de l'Algérie was relocated from Algiers to Paris in 1900, and that of the Bank of Chōsen from Seoul (then named Keijō) to Tokyo in 1926.

Other banks of issue were established for nominally sovereign countries but under foreign control (in some cases even including headquarters abroad) that was associated with quasi-colonial relations. These included the National Bank of Haiti (est. 1881 in Paris), Imperial Bank of Persia (est. 1889 in London), National Bank of Egypt (est. 1898 in Cairo), State Bank of Morocco (est. 1907 in Tangier), National bank of Albania (est. 1925 in Rome), as well as multiple banks in Qing China and the Beiyang government such as the Deutsch-Asiatische Bank (est. 1889), Russo-Chinese Bank (est. 1895), Banque Sino-Belge (est. 1902), or Banque Industrielle de Chine (est. 1913). Japan's Dai-Ichi Bank played a similar role in the Korean Empire in the years preceding annexation in 1910. The Imperial Ottoman Bank (est. 1863 in Constantinople) was foreign-owned but with such autonomy that it would never neatly fit the description of a quasi-colonial bank. The Hongkong and Shanghai Bank, established in 1866 simultaneously in British Hong Kong and the Shanghai International Settlement, combined the features of colonial and quasi-colonial banks of issue, as did the Banque de l'Indochine through its operations in China from 1898 onwards.

In languages other than English, some of these colonial banks or currency boards have had "bank of issue" in their name. These include the Bank of Issue in Poland during World War II (German: Emissionsbank in Polen), and several monetary authorities in the French-speaking world branded Institut d'Émission. Among the latter, the Paris-based Institut d'Émission d'Outre-Mer and Institut d'Émission des Départements d'Outre-Mer are still in activity, even though only the former remains a bank of issue (issuing the CFP franc).

== Generalisation of central banking ==
By the end of the 19th century, central banks had established a monopoly on money issuance in only a subset of the world's sovereign countries, such as the United Kingdom, France, Japan, Austria-Hungary and Belgium. Other countries such as Germany and Italy were well on their way towards that model, with banks of issue other than the central bank losing their residual issuance role in 1926 and 1935 respectively. By contrast, central banks did not exist at all in large parts of the world. In Latin America, the only central bank existing until World War I was the Central Bank of Uruguay established in 1896; the Brussels International Financial Conference of 1920 played a seminal role in the general adoption of the central banking paradigm in Latin America, as it did in the newly independent countries of central and eastern Europe with the support of the Economic and Financial Organization of the League of Nations. Later in the century, decolonization led to the gradual replacement of colonial banks of issue by national central banks.

In Hong Kong, a system of multiple banks of issue survives, with Bank of China, HSBC and Standard Chartered authorized to issue their own banknotes even though monetary policy is entrusted to the Hong Kong Monetary Authority. Similar systems are in place for the issuance of the banknotes of Scotland (with Bank of Scotland, Clydesdale Bank, and Royal Bank of Scotland) and banknotes of Northern Ireland (with Bank of Ireland, Danske Bank, and Ulster Bank), both under the authority of the Bank of England.

== See also ==
- Money creation
- Counterfeit money
- History of money
