= Credito Mobiliare =

Former Italian bank

- Native name: Società generale di credito mobiliare italiano
- Company type: Public company
- Industry: Financial services
- Predecessor: Cassa del Commercio e dell'Industria di Torino
- Founded: 1863
- Defunct: 1894
- Fate: Liquidated
- Successor: Banca Commerciale Italiana
- Headquarters: Turin, Italy
- Key people: Domenico Balduino (General manager 1863-1885)
- Products: Banking services

The Società generale di credito mobiliare italiano (lit. 'General Company of Italian Financial Credit'), often referred to simply as Credito Mobiliare, was a major Italian bank in the last third of the 19th century.

It was established in 1863 in Turin with support from the Pereire brothers, succeeding a previous venture, the Cassa del Commercio e dell'Industria di Torino (lit. 'Bank of Trade and Industry of Turin'), which had been founded in 1852 and had been supported by the French Rothschilds in the late 1850s.

The Credito Mobiliare failed to survive the major Italian financial crisis of the early 1890s and was liquidated in 1893. Some of its operations were re-organized as the Banca Commerciale Italiana, marking the transition from French to German influence in Italian investment banking.

== History ==
The Cassa del Commercio e dell'Industria di Torino was established in 1852 and reorganized in 1856 with support from Paris-based financier James Mayer de Rothschild, who wanted to pre-empt efforts by his French competitors the Pereire brothers to expand on the Italian market. That effort, however, did not succeed. The Cassa was again restructured in 1860, and once again in 1863 when it was renamed Credito Mobiliare. The latter transaction was executed with the support of the Pereire-controlled Crédit Mobilier, and as a consequence, half of the equity belonged to the previous shareholders of the Cassa and the other half to stakeholders of the Crédit Mobilier, including the Pereires themselves. The newly rebranded bank was immediately listed on the stock exchange.

During the panic of 1866, the Credito Mobiliare underwent a bank run but avoided failure thanks to the support of the Crédit Mobilier and of the National Bank of the Sardinian States. Following that experience, Domenico Balduino, the bank's general manager since the 1860 restructuring, pivoted towards investment banking, making the Credito Mobiliare the dominant player on that market in the following two decades, financing numerous industrial and infrastructure ventures and helping them sell securities.

Following Balduino's death in 1885, Giacinto Frascara became the Credito Mobiliare's general manager. As the bank had become overexposed to the construction sector, Frascara attempted to mitigate the risk by purchasing deposit banks and other financial institutions, including the Milan-based Banca di Credito Italiano in 1892. This did not prevent the Credito Mobiliare from succumbing to the financial fragility that followed the domestic Banca Romana scandal and international panic of 1893. It was placed in liquidation in 1893, with the newly created Bank of Italy assuming some of its losses.

== See also ==
- Banca Generale
- Banco di Sconto e Sete
- Banca di Credito Italiano
- List of banks in Italy
