= Banca Generale =

Former Italian bank

- Type: Private company
- Industry: Financial services
- Founded: 1871 in Milan, Italy
- Defunct: 1894
- Fate: Bankrupt
- Headquarters: Rome, Italy
- Products: Investment banking

The Banca Generale (lit. 'General Bank') was a major Italian investment bank between its founding in 1871 and its bankruptcy in 1894.

== History ==
The Banca Generale was founded in 1871 in Milan and started operations in 1872. Its headquarters were located in Rome, and its backers included two interrelated European financial families, the Bischoffsheims and Goldchmidts; Vienna-based Unionbank; and Italian bankers from Milan, Trieste and Turin, such as the Weill-Schott and Morpurgo families. Together with the Credito Mobiliare, the Banca Generale dominated the Italian investment banking market in the 1870s and 1880s, and the two were the dominant financial institutions in Italy other than the country's six banks of issue. The Banca Generale eventually went bankrupt on 18 January 1894, in a context of financial fragility following the domestic Banca Romana scandal and international panic of 1893.

Former executives at Banca Generale moved to leading positions in other banks, namely Otto Joel at Banca Commerciale Italiana and Enrico Rava at Credito Italiano.

== See also ==
- Monteverde Angel
- Banco di Sconto e Sete
- Banca di Credito Italiano
- List of banks in Italy
