= National Bank of the Kingdom of Italy =

Former Italian bank

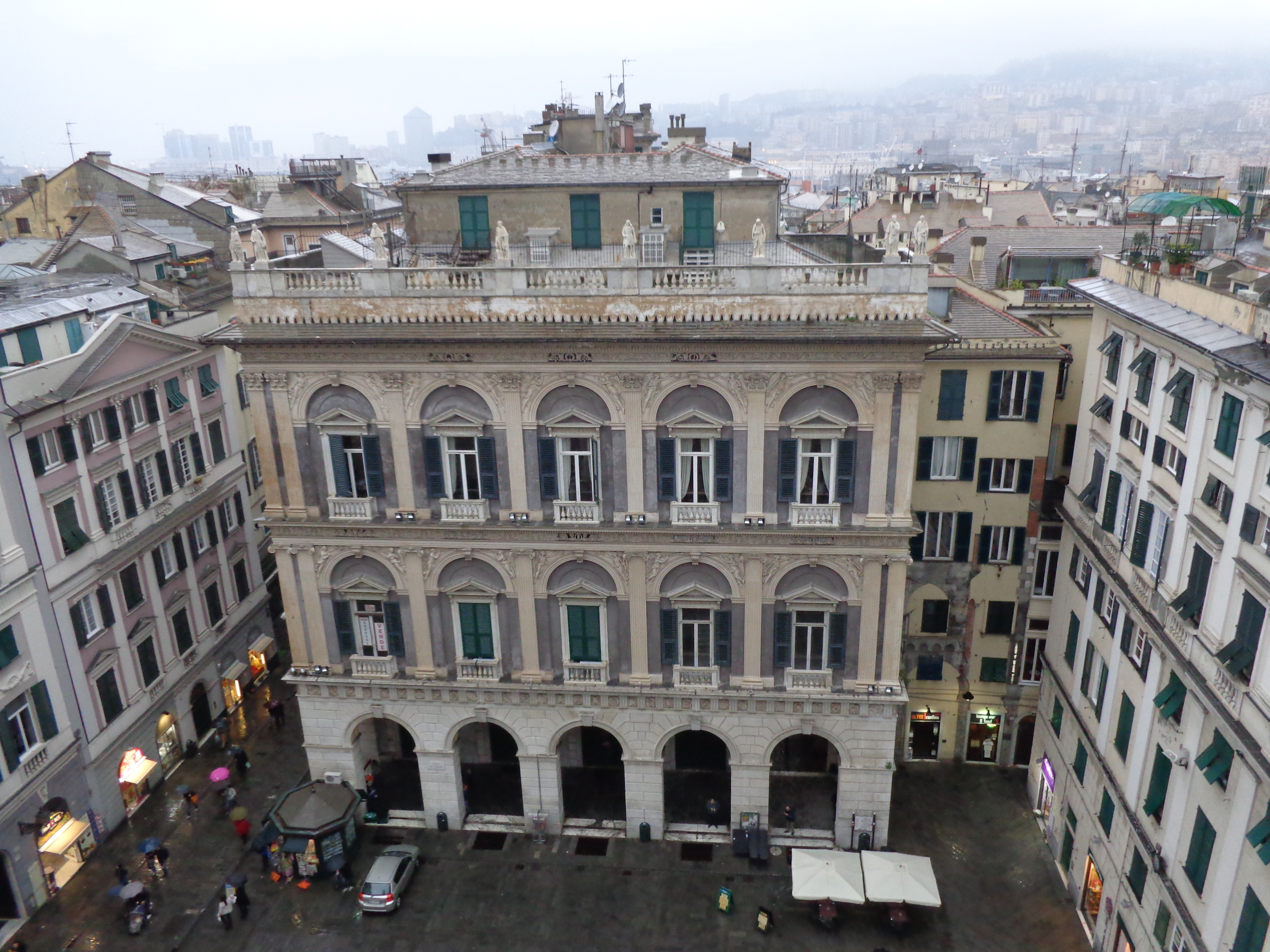
Palazzo Bendinelli Sauli, seat of the Bank of Genoa, then Genovese seat of the National Bank

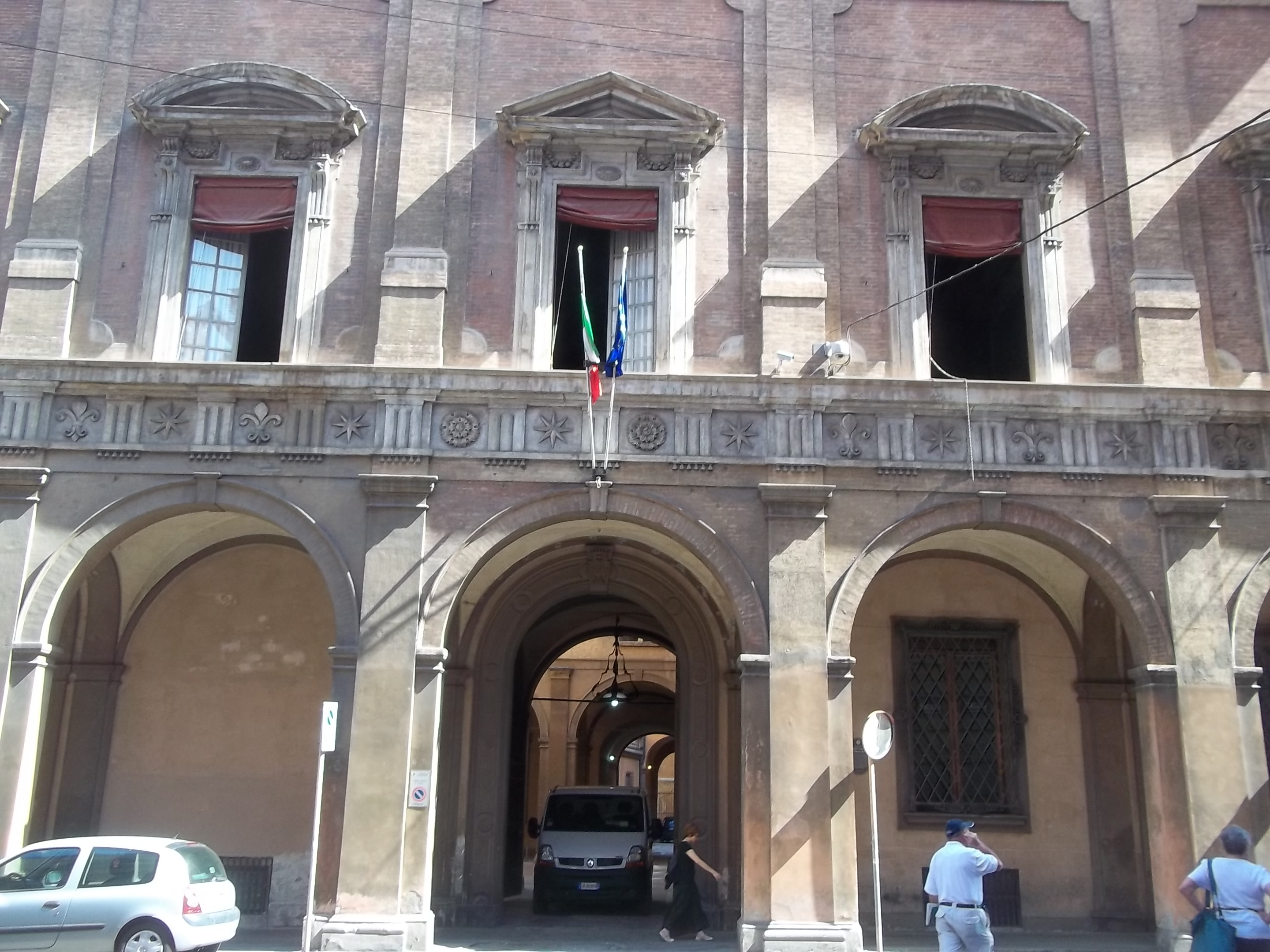
Palazzo Marescalchi in Bologna, seat of the Bank of the Four Legations absorbed by the National Bank in 1860

The National Bank of the Kingdom of Italy (Italian: Banca Nazionale nel Regno d'Italia), known from 1850 to around 1870 as the National Bank of the Sardinian States (Italian: Banca Nazionale negli Stati Sardi), was a bank of issue of the Kingdom of Sardinia then the Kingdom of Italy after unification in 1861. Despite its name, it had no monopoly on money issuance, in a financial system that proved prone to instability. It was successively headquartered in Genoa (1850-1853), Turin (1850-1865), Florence (1865-1873), and Rome (1873-1893). Following the controversial failure of Banca Romana, the National Bank was eventually merged with several peers in 1893 to form the Bank of Italy.

== Background ==
The first decades of the 19th century saw a number of note-issuing banks created on a local basis, reflecting the political fragmentation of Italy and similar to experiences in other parts of Europe such as Germany or Belgium. These banks differed from 20th-century central banks as they maintained commercial banking operations in addition to those linked with their monetary role, and had no monopoly on the latter. In the Kingdom of Sardinia, they included the Bank of Annecy (French: Banque d'Annecy), founded 1840 in Annecy; the Bank of Genoa (Italian: Banca di Genova, also known as Banca di Sconti, Depositi e Conti Correnti), founded 16 March 1844 in Genoa by a group of traders led by Carlo Bombrini; and the Bank of Turin (Italian: Banca di Torino), founded 16 October 1847 in Turin.

== National Bank of the Sardinian States ==
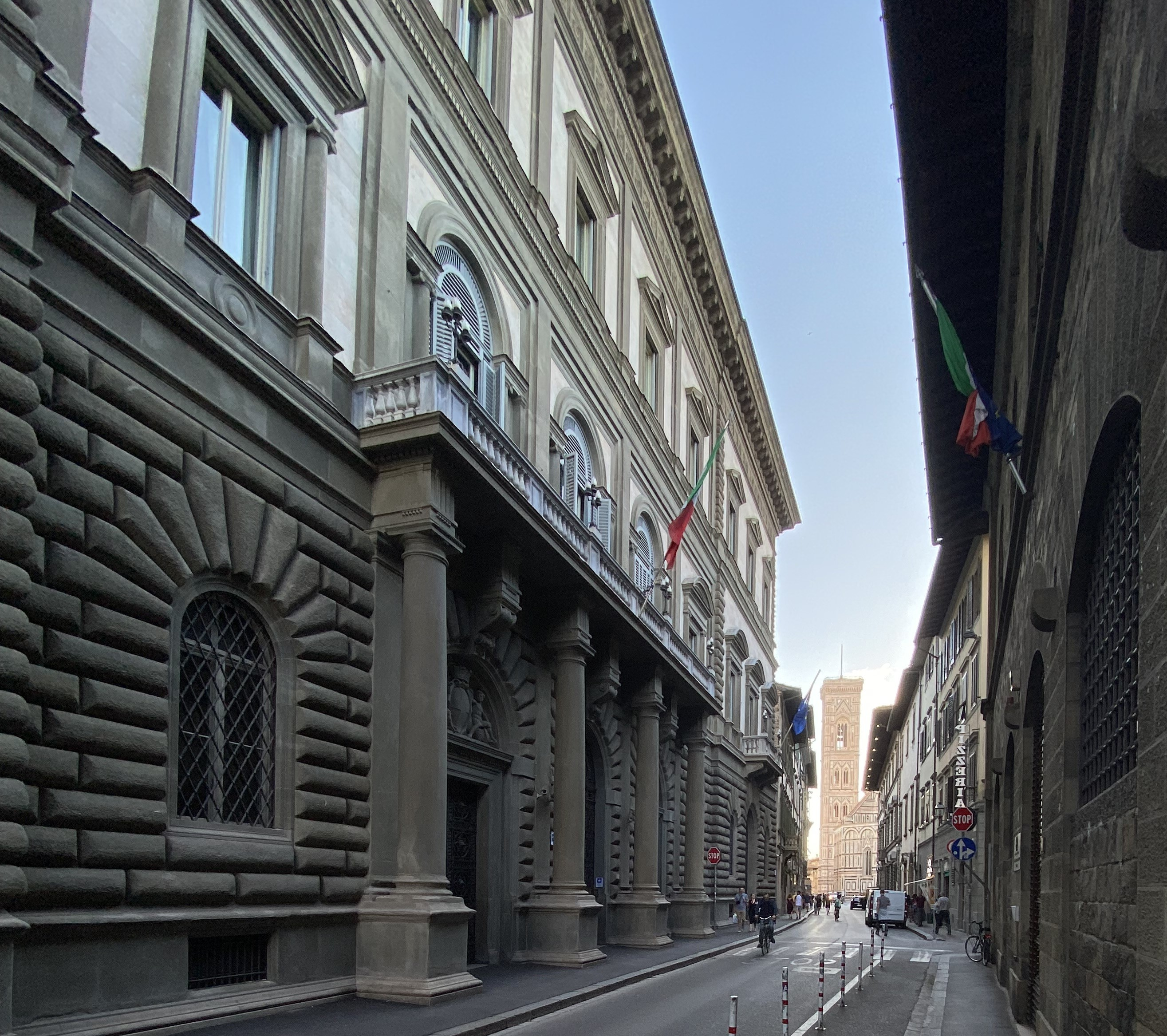
Former seat of the National Bank in Florence, inaugurated in 1869 and later converted into a branch of the Bank of Italy, with Giotto's Campanile in the background

By royal decree of 14 December 1849 ratified by law of 9 July 1850, the struggling Bank of Turin was merged into the Bank of Genoa, which on the occasion was renamed the National Bank of the Sardinian States. (A separate bank also named Banca di Torino was established in 1871.)

Despite its name, the National Bank did not hold a note-issuance monopoly in the kingdom, since the Bank of Savoy, which succeeded the Bank of Annecy in 1851, was separately granted an issuance privilege. On 24 May 1851, then Finance Minister Cavour presented a bill authorizing the bank to increase its capital from 8 to 16 million, requiring it to open branches in Nice and Vercelli, and designating it as the kingdom's fiscal agent.

The National Bank initially maintained two seats of equal rank in Genoa and Turin, but this arrangement soon became unwieldy. In 1853, it was agreed that the general management would be permanently located in Turin. The seat was initially established in the former office of the Bank of Turin at Via Arsenale 11 (later demolished), then on Via della Provvidenza (later Via XX Settembre), and from 1858 at Via Arsenale 6, in the Palazzo Ferrero d'Ormea which the National Bank eventually occupied in full and is still the Turin branch of the Bank of Italy. In 1859, as a consequence of the annexation of Lombardy following the Second Italian War of Independence, the National Bank created a third seat in Milan, and clarified on that occasion that Turin would become its sole head office. In 1860-1861, it absorbed the Bank of Parma (Italian: Banca di Parma, est. 1858) and the Bologna-based Bank of the Four Legations (est. 1855). Also in 1860, it added seats in Naples and Palermo following the annexation of the Kingdom of the Two Sicilies.

In 1865, the kingdom's capital was moved to Florence, and the National Bank consequently opened a sixth seat and transferred its head office there. In 1867, in the wake of the plebiscite of Veneto of 1866, it opened a seventh seat in Venice upon absorption of the Stabilimento Mercantile di Venezia, a local bank of issue established in 1853, and acquired the Palazzo Dolfin Manin for its office. In 1869, it moved into the new head office building in the center of Florence which it had commissioned from architect Antonio Cipolla.

== National Bank of the Kingdom of Italy ==
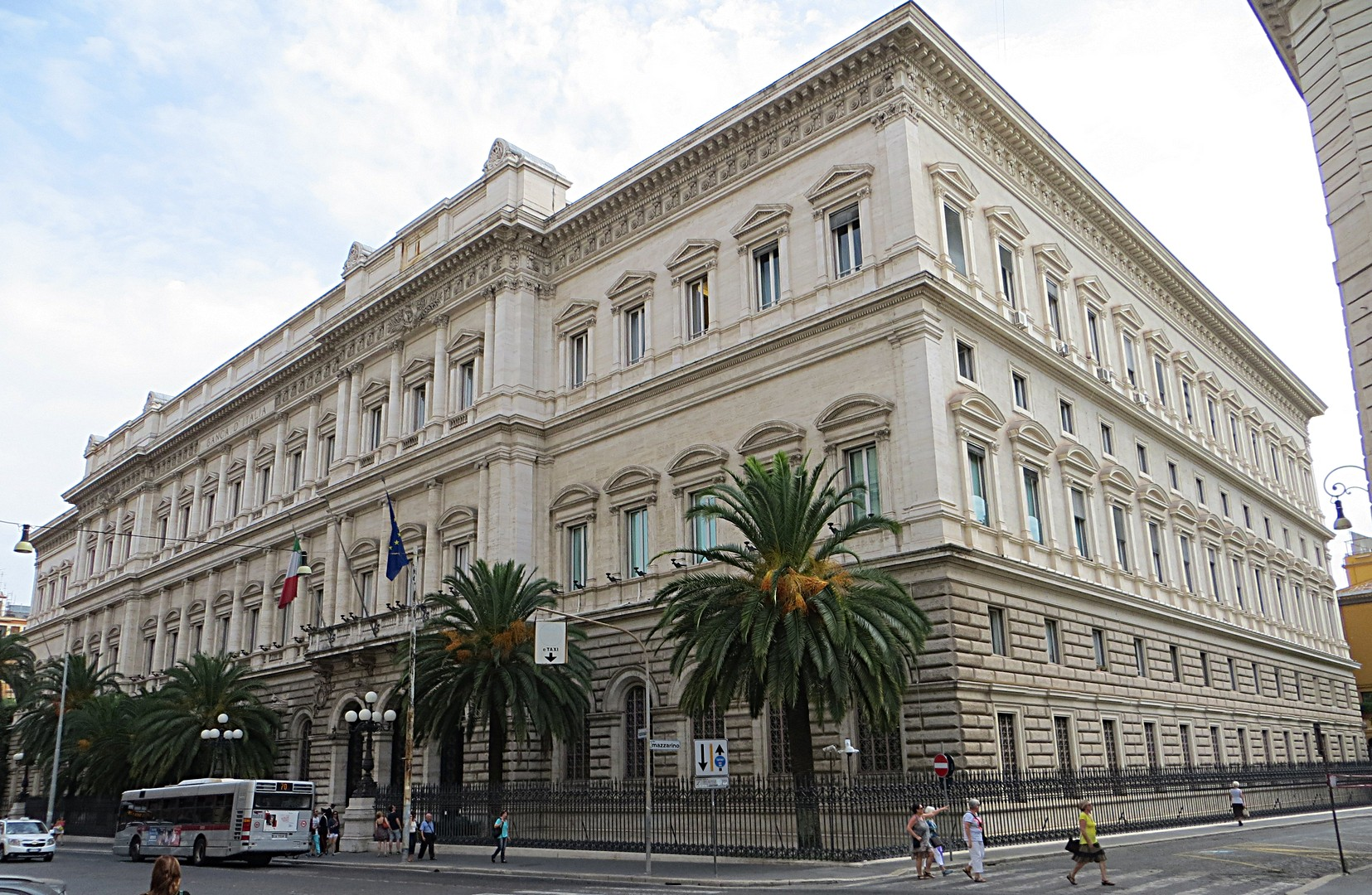
Palazzo Koch in Rome, completed for the National Bank in 1892 and seat of the Bank of Italy since 1893

The National Bank's renaming was a gradual process, partly because of the simultaneous existence of the Banca Nazionale Toscana in Florence, with which merger projects in the 1860s had failed for political reasons. The new name, referring to the whole kingdom instead of just its Sardinian element, appeared in legislation in May 1866, but on banknotes only in the early 1870s.

On 6 February 1871, the National Bank opened an eighth seat in Rome, and its general management relocated there from Florence in October 1873 even though its Governing Council (Italian: Consiglio Superiore) kept Florence as its meeting place until the creation of the Bank of Italy twenty years later. After using temporary offices near Largo di Torre Argentina then in dependencies of the Palazzo Ruspoli, it commissioned a large head office building, designed by architect Gaetano Koch and subsequently known as Palazzo Koch, which was erected between 1888 and 1892.

In 1874, to mitigate the risk of excessive issuance, the Italian government fostered the formation of a consortium under which each of the six participating banks were assigned caps on their respective volumes of issuance. The consortium brought the National Bank together with Banca Nazionale Toscana, Banca Toscana di Credito, Banca Romana, Banco di Napoli, and Banco di Sicilia. In 1893, the National Bank absorbed the Banca Nazionale Toscana, the Banca Toscana di Credito, and the operations of the liquidated Banca Romana to form the Bank of Italy. The Banco di Napoli and Banco di Sicilia only lost their residual issuance privilege in 1926.

== Leadership ==
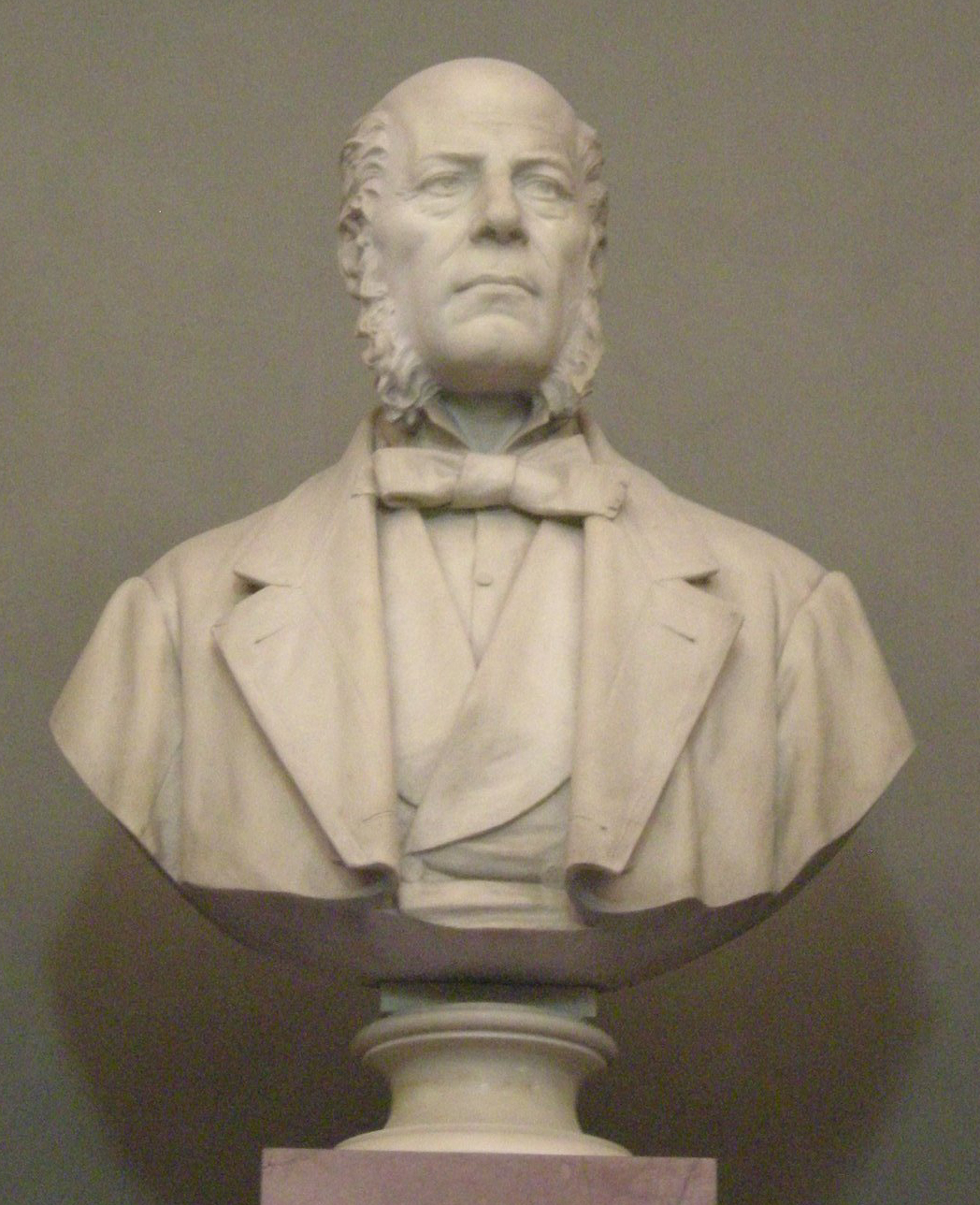
Carlo Bombrini (1804-1882) was the lifetime governor of the National Bank of the Kingdom of Italia and of its two predecessors, the Bank of Genoa and the National Bank of the Sardinian States

- Carlo Bombrini, Governor 1845 - 1882 (initially at the Bank of Genoa)
- Giacomo Grillo, Governor 1882 - 1893

== See also ==
- Bank of Prussia
- List of banks in Italy
