= Bank of Italy =

Central bank of Italy

Coordinates: 41°53′50″N 12°29′20″E

Bank of Italy Banca d'Italia

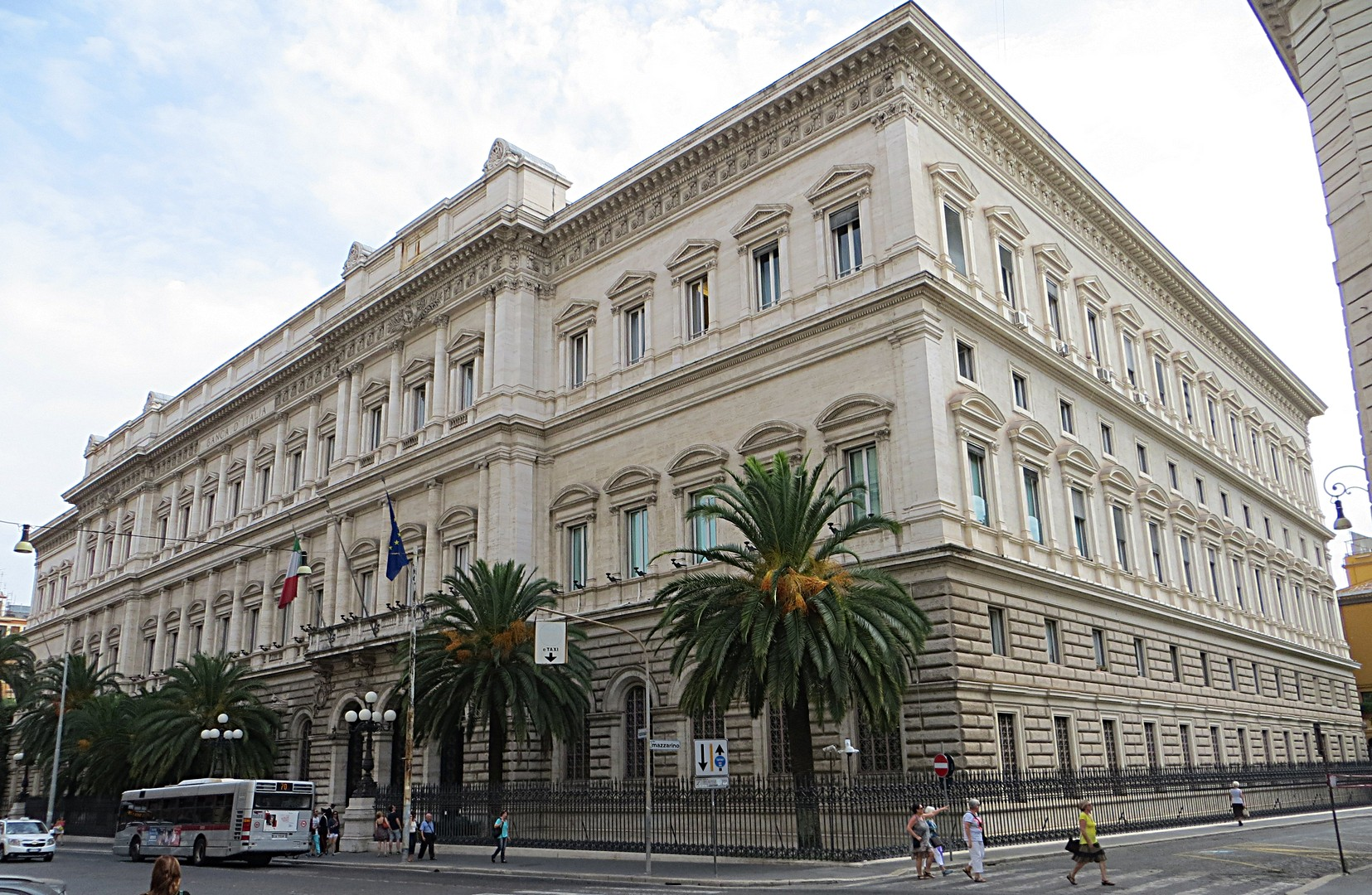
- Palazzo Koch in Rome, headquarters of the Bank of Italy
- Central bank of: Italy
- Headquarters: Palazzo Koch, Rome, Italy
- Established: 10 August 1893; 133 years ago
- Governor: Fabio Panetta
- Reserves: €307 billion (2025)
- Website: bancaditalia.it
- ^{1} The Bank of Italy still exists but the ECB took over monetary policy in 1999 and European banking supervision in 2014.

The Bank of Italy (Italian: Banca d'Italia, pronounced [ˈbaŋka diˈtaːlja], informally referred to as Bankitalia) is the national central bank for Italy within the Eurosystem. It was the Italian central bank from 1893 to 1998, issuing the lira.

In addition to its monetary role, the Bank of Italy is also a financial supervisory authority. In that capacity, it increasingly implements policies set at the European Union level. It is the national competent authority for Italy within European Banking Supervision. It is a voting member of the Board of Supervisors of the European Banking Authority (EBA). It is Italy's designated National Resolution Authority and plenary session member of the Single Resolution Board (SRB). It provides the permanent single common representative for Italy in the Supervisory composition of the General Board of the Anti-Money Laundering Authority (AMLA). It also hosts the Institute for the Supervision of Insurance (Italian acronym IVASS), which is a voting member of the Board of Supervisors of the European Insurance and Occupational Pensions Authority (EIOPA). It is also a member of the European Systemic Risk Board (ESRB).

== History ==
The institution was established in 1893 from the combination of three major banks in Italy (after the Banca Romana scandal). The new central bank first issued banknotes during 1926. Until 1928, it was directed by a general manager and after this time by a governor elected by an internal commission of managers, with a decree from the president of the Italian Republic, for a term of seven years. In 1863, the crisis of the world money market created panic and the rush to the counters to collect the metallic currency in exchange for the banknotes. The Italian government responded in 1866 by introducing the fiat and legal tender of paper money. The government was accused in this way of favouring the issuing banks, and a long debate called the "banking question" arose about the advisability of having one or more issuers.

The Minghetti-Finali law of 1873 established the mandatory consortium of issuing institutions among the six existing issuing institutions, the National Bank of the Kingdom of Italy, Banca Nazionale Toscana, Banca Toscana di Credito, Banca Romana, Banco di Napoli, and Banco di Sicilia; the measure proved insufficient. Following the Banca Romana scandal, the reorganization of the issuing institutions became necessary.

=== Establishment ===
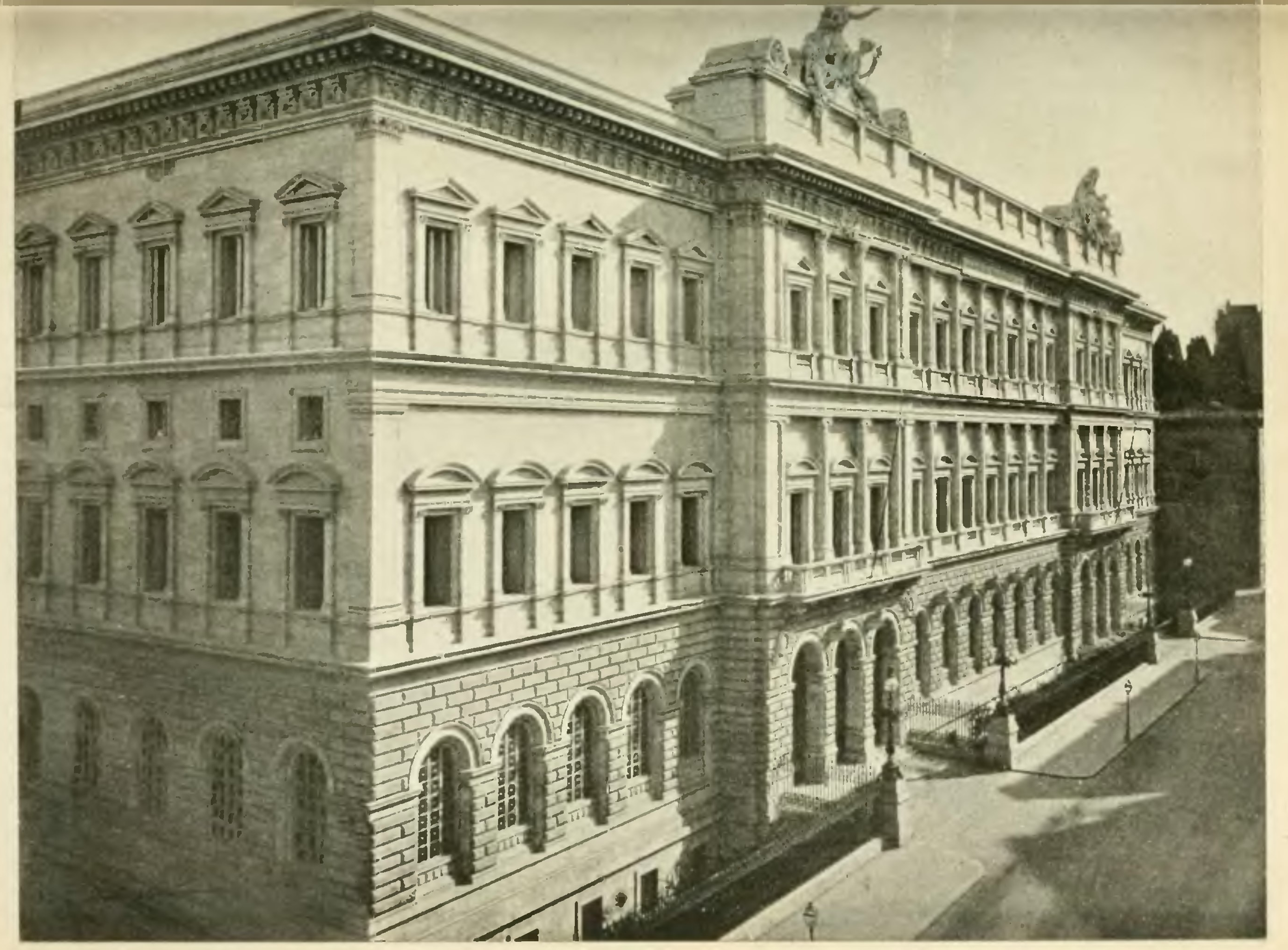
Palazzo Koch in Rome, headquarters of the Bank of Italy, at the end of the 19th century

Law no. 449 of 10 August 1893 of the Giolitti I government established the Bank of Italy through the merger of four banks: the National Bank in the Kingdom of Italy (formerly Banca Nazionale in the Sardinian States), the Banca Nazionale Toscana, the Banca Toscana di Credito for the Industries and Commerce of Italy and with the liquidation management of Banca Romana. With a complex series of mergers between these banks, the current Bank of Italy was formed. Some families of bankers, historical partners: Bombrini, Bastogi, and Balduino were the supporters of the operation. The institute enjoyed (together with the Banks of Naples and Sicily) the issuing privilege, it also acted as a "bank of banks" through the rediscount of bills, but did not have supervisory powers over other banks.

The bank remains a private limited company and was headed by a director. From 1900 to 1928, Bonaldo Stringher was the director and gave the Bank the role of manager of Italian monetary policy and lender of last resort, bringing it closer to a modern central bank. In particular, he understood that a central bank cannot aim at maximizing profit (which is achieved by printing as much paper money) but must instead aim at price stability. In 1907, the Bank of Italy coordinated the rescue of the Italian Banking Company, a major lender of Fiat, an operation that ended with the absorption of the bank in crisis into the Italian Discount Bank. In 1911 the central bank organized a consortium to rescue the steel companies (Acciaierie di Terni, Ilva and others) of which the Bank of Italy was directly creditor, financing the operation also through the issue of banknotes.

In 1912, the credit institute for cooperation, with social purposes, was established, led by the Bank of Italy and also participated by public bodies, savings banks, Monte dei Paschi di Siena, the Cassa di Previdenza, and the Credit Institution for the Cooperatives of Milan. The institute in 1929 was transformed by its director Arturo Osio into the Banca Nazionale del Lavoro. In 1913, the Subsidy Consortium was established, led by the Bank of Italy and also participated by the Banks of Naples and Sicily, some savings banks, Monte dei Paschi di Siena and by the San Paolo Bank of Turin. In 1922, the Consortium saved Ansaldo and took control of it. In 1923, it did the same with Banco di Roma. Also in 1913, Francesco Saverio Nitti drew up a bill that entrusted the Bank of Italy with the supervision of other banks, but the private banks managed to avoid its approval. In 1914, the Bank of Italy assisted the Banco di Roma, which had to devalue its capital due to losses reported in the activities in the eastern Mediterranean.

=== Banking Law of 1926 and aftermath ===
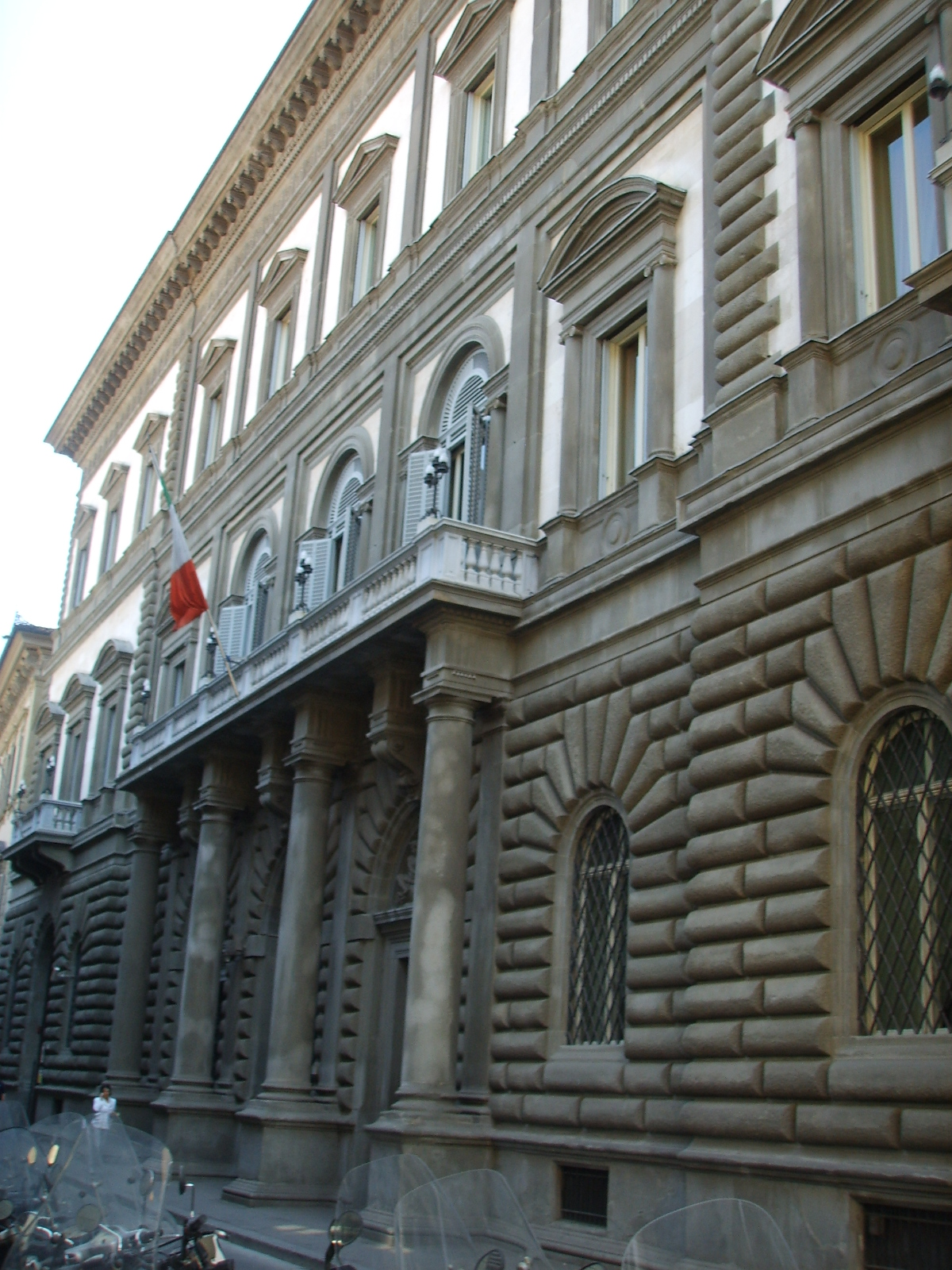
Bank of Italy building in Florence, built when the city was the capital of Italy (1865–1871)

In 1921, after World War I, it was always the Bank of Italy that led the consortium that managed the liquidation of the Italian Discount Bank and saved the Banco di Roma once again from crisis. In 1926, the Italian fascist government of Benito Mussolini undertook a major reorganization of the monetary system, partly motivated by the desire to assert the state's dominance over the private credit system and especially the two Milanese investment banks, Banca Commerciale Italiana and Credito Italiano. The context of the new legislation was also affected by the ongoing turmoil affecting banks affiliated with the Christian democratic Italian People's Party, such as Credito Nazionale.

R.D.L. 812 of 6 May 1926 granted the Bank of Italy an exclusive right to issue currency, terminating the prior issuance privileges of the Banco di Napoli and Banco di Sicilia and abrogating the Royal Decree of 28 April 1910, no. 204. Subsequently, R.D.L. 1820 of 6 November 1926 entrusted the Bank of Italy with the task of supervising savings banks. Also in 1926, the Subsidy Consortium was reorganized as Istituto Liquidazioni, still under the control of the central bank. In 1933 it would be separated from the bank and absorbed by the newly established Istituto per la Ricostruzione Industriale. In 1928, the Bank was reorganized. The general manager was joined by a governor with greater powers. While all the banks were in very bad conditions, the Banca Nazionale del Lavoro of the self-styled socialist Arturo Osio, in 1929 confiscated eleven Catholic banks, and in 1932 the Banca Agricola Italiana which had financed SNIA Viscosa di Gualino.

=== Banks and the economy of the 1930s ===
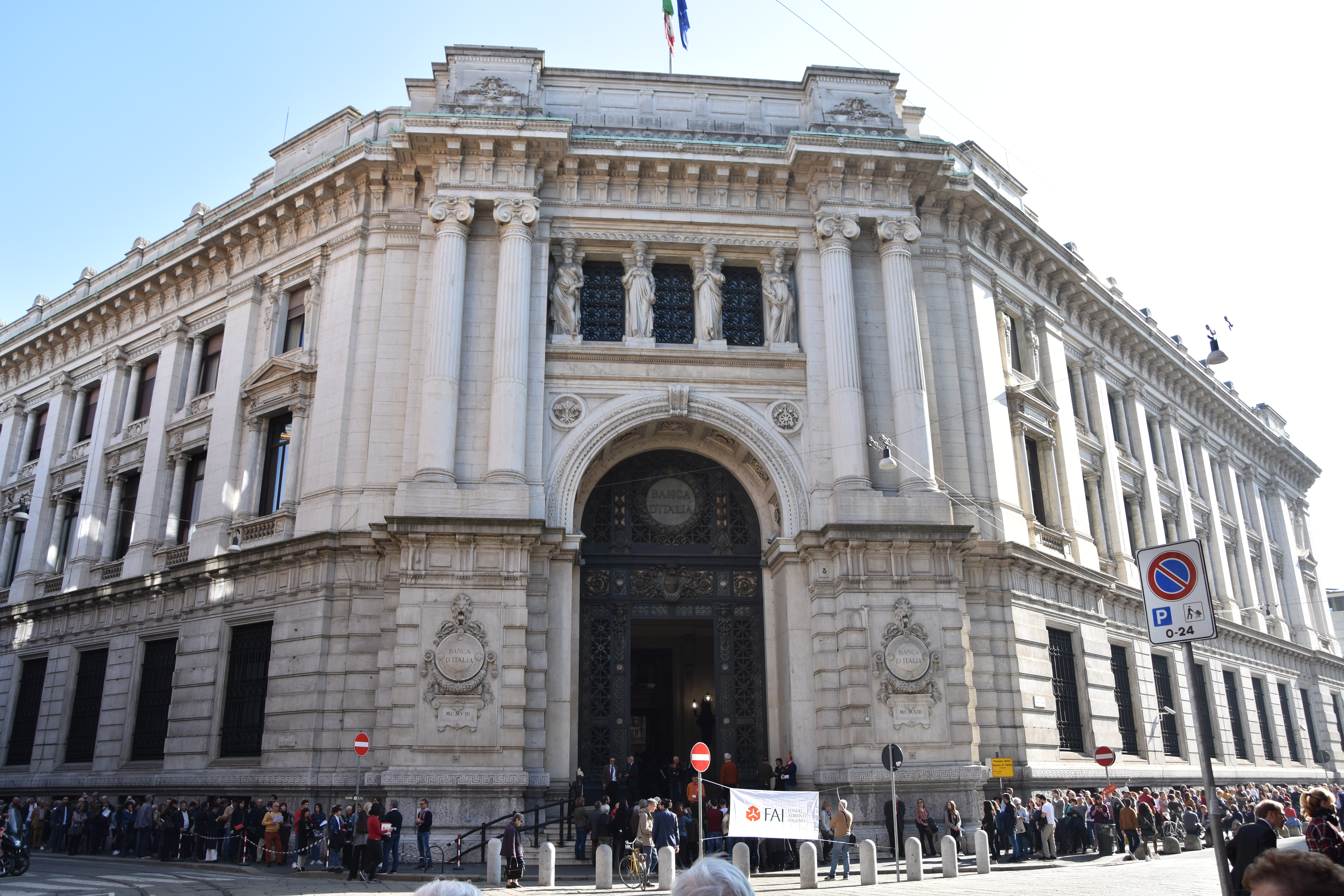
Bank of Italy building in Milan

Italy in the 1930s had an agricultural economy, a small number of industrial families who relied on the subcontracting of local suppliers, formed by a myriad of small family-run businesses, not international and whose survival depended on large groups of industrialists, in turn, linked to commercial banks. The savings from agriculture flowed into the rural coffers, the popular banks and the cooperative credit which financed the life of the provincial crafts, small businesses and construction. The job of the banks was to match the customers' short-term investment horizon with the long-term investments of large groups (Rediscount). National banks turned to local banks that had large deposits of deposits for smaller, low-risk loans. The Cassa Depositi e Prestiti channelled postal savings in favour of local authorities, public institutions and infrastructures, which were a way of absorbing mass unemployment, through a vast program of public works. The ideological basis of the law was that savings are a matter of national interest and must be protected by the State, a principle also enshrined in the Republican Constitution and concretized in the first place in the law establishing the interbank guarantee fund and in the policy of public bailouts.

The banking legislation of 1936–1938 established a banking supervisory agency, the Ispettorato per la Difesa del Risparmio e l'Esercizio del Credito (IDREC), chaired by the Bank of Italy's governor. The bank no longer had the right to give credit to individuals but only to other banks as a lender of last resort. Finally, it had the power to require other banks to deposit a portion of the available funds with the same central bank; by varying the share, the Bank of Italy could operate credit tightening or enlargements. The law established certain minimum capital and management requirements necessary to guarantee risk management, stability and operational continuity: minimum capital, minimum ratio between loans and deposits, credit limits, provisions for compulsory reserve.

=== IRI and World War II ===
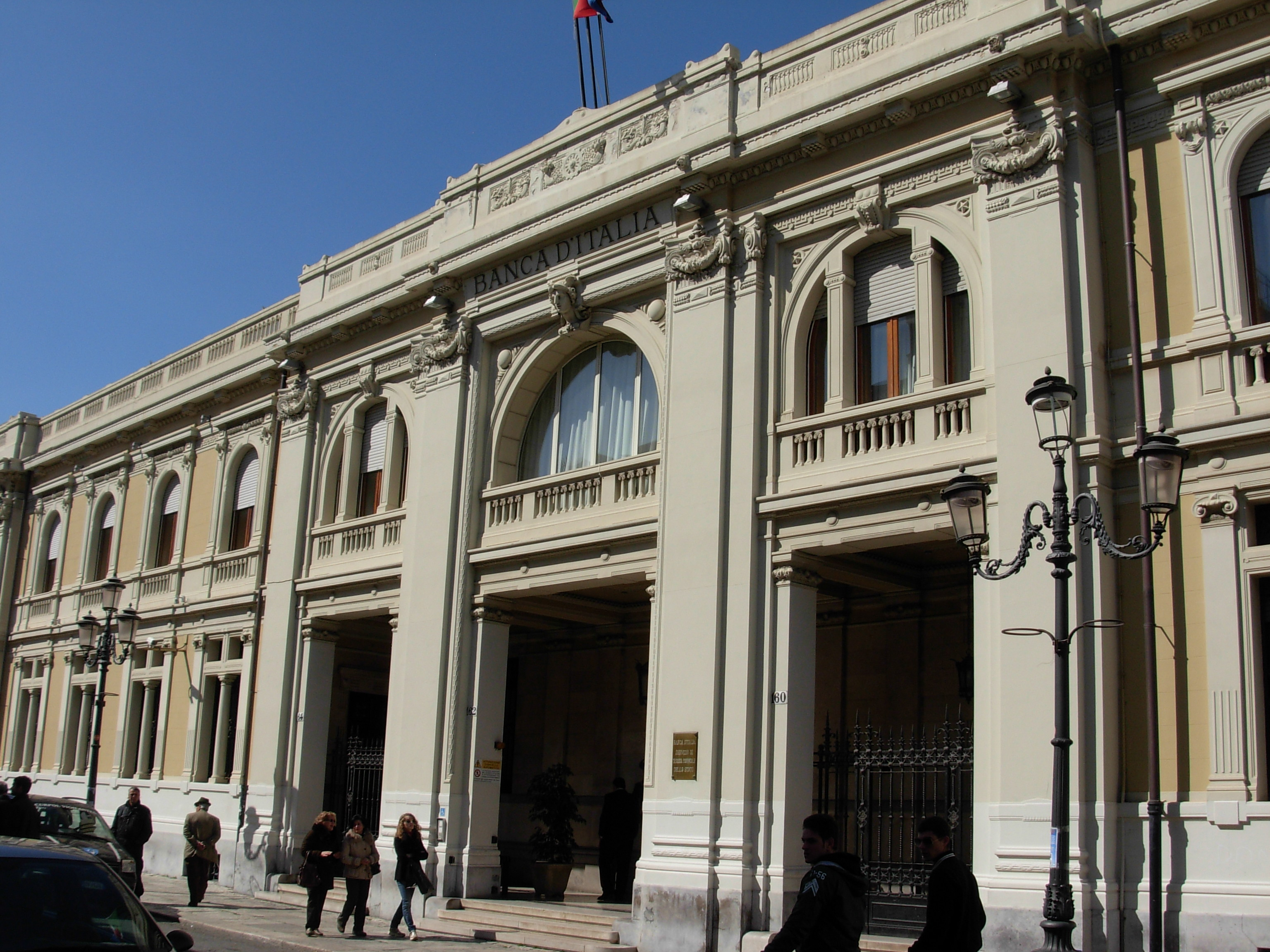
Bank of Italy building in Reggio Calabria

After the "defenestration" of Bonaldo Stringher, Alberto Beneduce took over and was forced to retire in 1936 after a "heart attack" during a meeting at the Bank for International Settlements in Basel. They conceived the duty of the banks towards the public interest of the country, as the subject who had to collect savings to lend them to entrepreneurs, as a tool for development and growth. The process was to be led by a "circulation bank", which would increase the speed of circulation of money in the real economy.

The Central Bank supported the fascist monetary policy of defending the stability of the Italian lira (known as the "Quota 90"), through the reduction of discounts and advances, and financing the enormous expenses of wars in the 1930s and 1940s through the unlimited issuing of money (and the "inflation tax", not progressive with income), as Hjalmar Schacht did in Germany under Hitler. Operationally, the government issued and sold debt securities to finance military spending, and the military industry reinvested its government profits in the purchase of such bonds as a de facto advance on future orders, fueling a closed financial circuit. In simple terms, this was something like the ECB issuing money and lending it to private banks who keep it in their current accounts with the ECB. This mechanism was called "capital circuit". The printing of tickets and the scarcity of consumer goods created an overabundance of money that poured into bank deposits, allowing a new expansion of credit, which was directed in favour of the economic sectors themselves. given that the state paid the banks a higher interest on the BOTs than the savers. The absorption of savings into investments in fixed capital had already taken place in the First World War and industries were working with existing production capacities. Without consumption and investments, public spending by the state remained. The war could start with a modest tax levy and inflation within the normal limits in the first months, before the black market and ration cards.

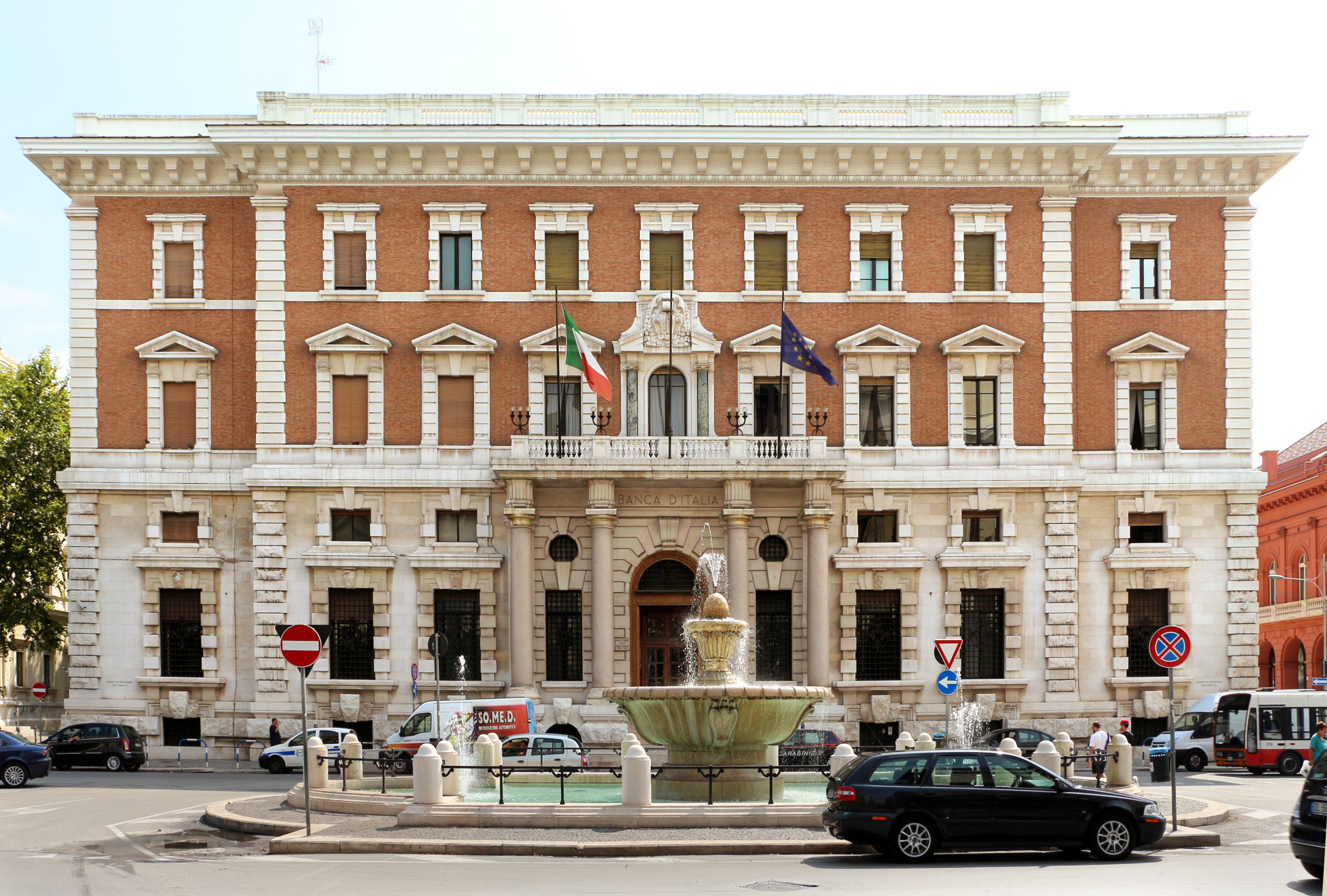
Bank of Italy building in Bari

The situation followed the conflict of interest between the state entrepreneur and the state bank, albeit in the name of a higher ideological purpose. In 1938, the government decreed the power to directly appoint presidents and vice-presidents of the board of directors of banks. Beneduce planned to have a public bank take over the long-term credit of large companies, financed with bonds of equal duration for public works, energy, and industry. After them, the Central Bank maintained a low-profile monetary policy, consistent with the directives of fascism. IRI operated differently, in agreement with the Italian banks and industries that supported fascism. The banks renounced exercising an option by "converting" the debts into shares (or a law in this regard), preferring not to enter directly into the ownership of the industrial groups. The groups transferred the bank debts to IRI, which became the new owner in exchange for shares (at the book value, not always the same as the market value), until they held control of the property and therefore of management. The debt of the IRI rose to nine and a half billion lire at the time, two-thirds of which were paid within the war, because they were drastically diluted by inflation which has the effect of lowering the real weight of debts until the accounting entries are cancelled. of issuance, but also to halve the purchasing power of small savers. The remaining debt was paid by 1953.

The IRI in turn had debts towards the Bank of Italy for five billion lire: the State issued bonds for IRI for one and a half billion, "sterilizing" the debt that should have been repaid with "annuity" interest. accrued until 1971. The change of constitutional order and currency (exchange rate for conversion), and inflation meant that IRI (and industries) paid the Bank of Italy less than a third of the sum. After the armistice of 8 September, the German authorities demanded the delivery of the gold reserve. 173 tons of gold were first transferred to the Milan office, and then to Fortezza. Traces of it were subsequently lost. In the 1960s, the public debt increased and so did inflation. Governor Guido Carli made a policy of credit crunch to stop inflation, particularly in 1964. In general, the Bank of Italy played an important political role under this governorship. Other credit crunches were implemented between 1969 and 1970 due to the flight of capital abroad and in 1974 as a result of the oil crisis. In March 1979, the governor of the Bank of Italy, Paolo Baffi, and the deputy director in charge of supervision, Mario Sarcinelli, were accused by the Rome public prosecutor of private interest in official acts and personal aiding and abetting. Sarcinelli was arrested, and released from prison only after being suspended from duties relating to surveillance, while Baffi avoided prison due to his age. In 1981 the two will be completely acquitted. Subsequently, the suspicion will emerge that the indictment was wanted by P2 to prevent the Bank of Italy from supervising Roberto Cavali Banco Ambrosiano.

=== Postwar period ===
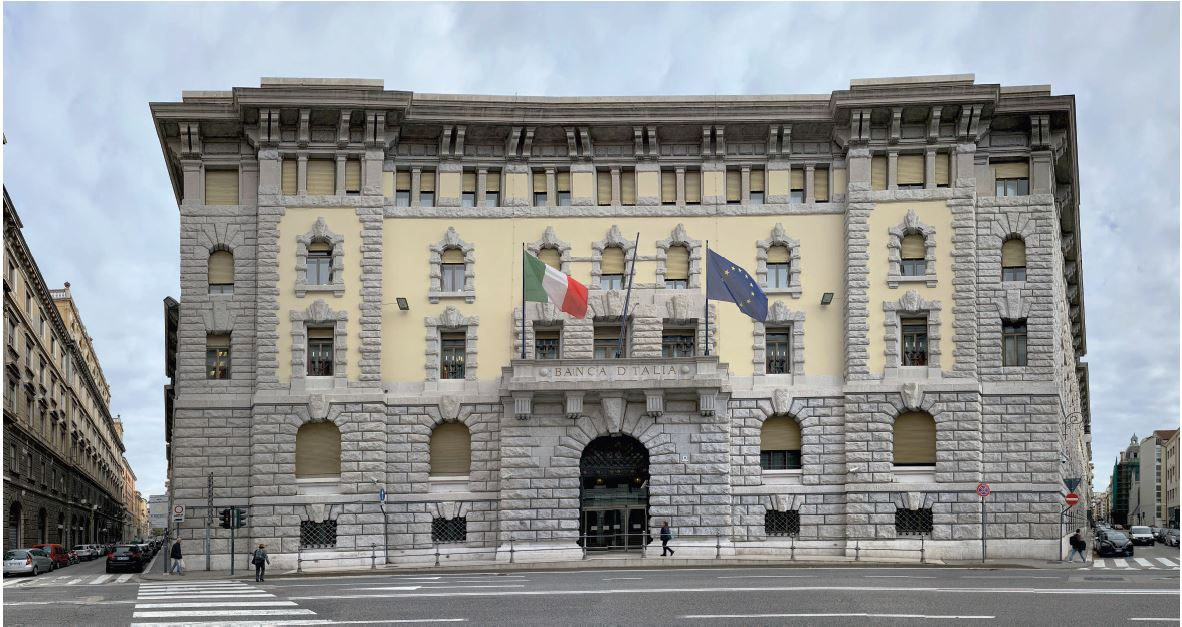
Bank of Italy building in Trieste

The postwar inflation, also due to the Am-lire, was fought with the credit crunch desired by the governor Luigi Einaudi, which was obtained through the compulsory reserve on deposits. In particular, the instrument of compulsory reserves of banks at the central bank was used, introduced in 1926 but never really applied. In 1948 the governor was given the task of regulating the money supply and deciding the discount rate. The universal banks were the ones that had gained the most from war and inflation (under the Authorization Regime of the Interministerial Credit Committee), with the greatest growth in deposits.

Along with the recovery, speculative stocks and capital flight abroad appeared. Credit limits were no longer tied to equity, as equity figures were completely distorted by inflation. The squeeze on lending, the liquidity crisis and the Eenaudian deflation pushed operators to finance themselves by placing stocks on the market and returning capital, thus blocking the rise in prices; and by resorting to self-financing (even without distributing profits), aided by the fact that inflation had made it possible to quickly amortize fixed assets whose book value was now nominal.

During the years of the Reconstruction, governor Donato Menichella governed the issue in a gradual and balanced way: he did not implement expansionary manoeuvres to encourage growth but was careful to avoid the creation of credit crunches. In this, he was helped by the low public debt. Its monetary policy program was stability for development. A part of the available bank savings was channelled annually to the Treasury to cover the budget deficit (in the current year), while during his tenure the public debt of the state never rose above 1% of GDP, until 1964. In July 1981, a "divorce" between the State (Ministry of the Treasury) and its central bank was initiated by the decision of the then Treasury Minister Beniamino Andreatta.

From that moment on, the institute was no longer required to purchase the bonds that the government was unable to place on the market, thus ceasing the monetization of the Italian public debt that it had carried out since the Second World War up to that moment. This decision was opposed by the Minister of Finance Rino Formica, who would have liked the Bank of Italy to be required to repay at least a portion of these securities, and from the summer of 1982 a series of intra-government verbal clashes between the two ministers known as the wives' quarrel, which was followed by the fall of the second Spadolini government a few months later. The divorce between the Ministry of the Treasury and the Bank of Italy is still considered by economic doctrine as a factor of great stabilization of inflation (which went from over 20% in 1980 to less than 5% in the following years) and a central prerequisite for guarantee the full independence of the technical monetary policy body (central bank) from the choices related to fiscal policy (under the responsibility of the government), but also a factor of considerable incidence of growth of the Italian public debt. The law of 7 February 1992 n. 82, proposed by the then Minister of the Treasury Guido Carli, clarifies that the decision on the discount rate is the exclusive competence of the governor and must no longer be agreed in concert with the Minister of the Treasury (the previous decree of the President of the Republic is modified in relation to the new law with the Presidential Decree of 18 July).

=== Euro and 2006 reform ===
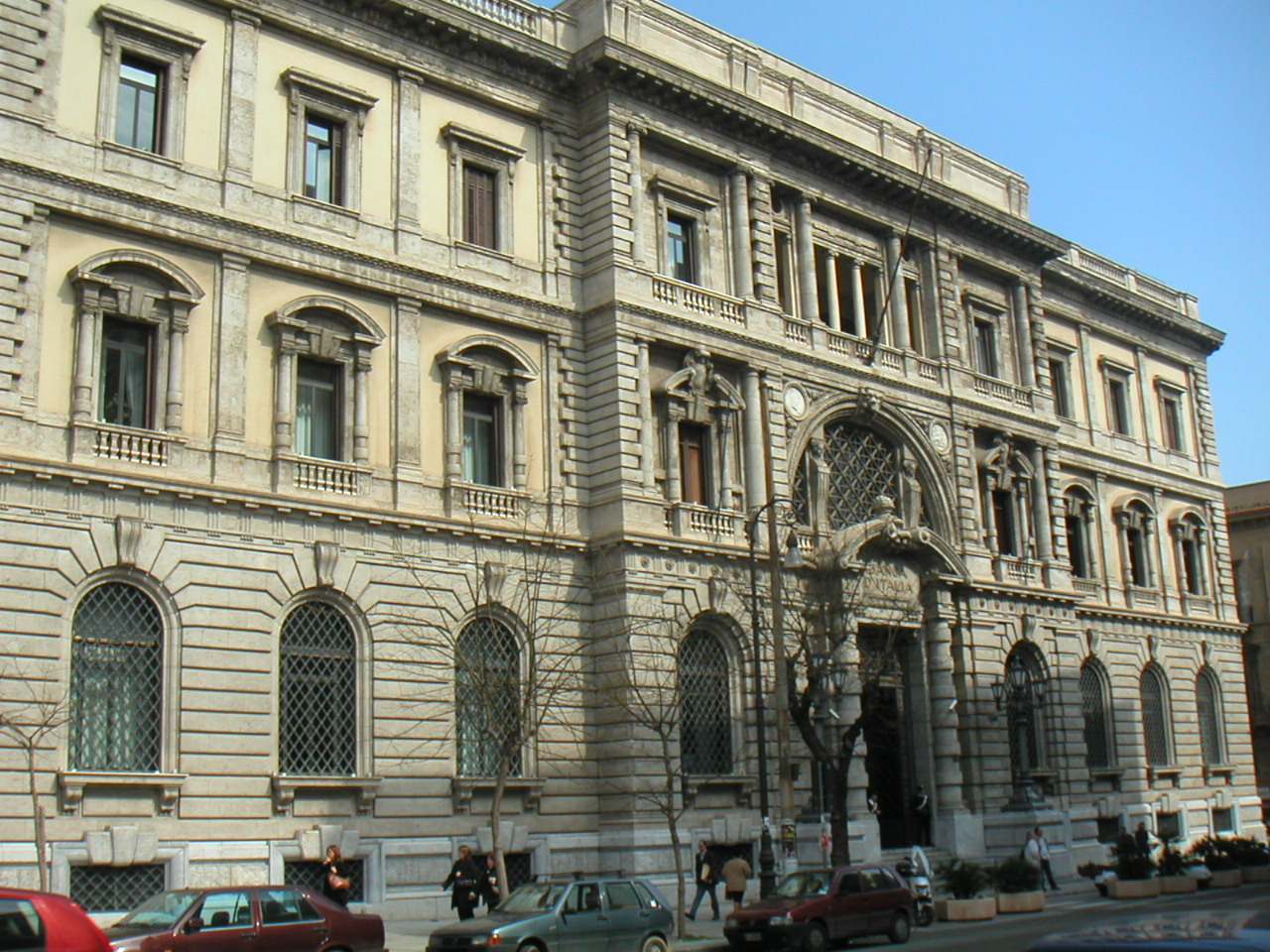
Bank of Italy building in Palermo

The Legislative Decree 10 March 1998 n. 43 removes the Bank of Italy from management by the Italian government, sanctioning its belonging to the European system of central banks. From this date, therefore, the quantity of currency in circulation is decided autonomously by the Central Bank. With the introduction of the Euro on 1 January 1999, the Bank thus loses the function of presiding over national monetary policy. This function has since been exercised collectively by the Governing Council of the European Central Bank, which also includes the Governor of the Bank of Italy. On 13 June 1999 the Senate of the Republic, during the XIII Legislature, discussed bill no. 4083 "Rules on the ownership of the Bank of Italy and on the criteria for appointing the Board of Governors of the Bank of Italy". This bill would like the state to acquire all the shares of the institute, but it is never approved.

On 4 January 2004, the weekly Famiglia Cristiana reportsed for the first time in history the list of participants in the capital of the Bank of Italy with the relative shares. The source is a Mediobanca Research & Studies dossier, directed by the researcher Fulvio Coltorti, who, by investigating backwards on the balance sheets of banks, insurance companies and institutions, and gradually noting the shares that indicated a shareholding in the capital of the Bank of Italia managed to reconstruct a large part of the list of participants of the highest Italian financial institution. On 20 September 2005, the list of shareholders was officially made available by the Bank of Italy; until now it was considered confidential. On 19 December 2005, after intense press campaigns and criticism of his actions in the context of the Bancopoli scandal, Governor Antonio Fazio resigned. A few days later, Mario Draghi, who took office on 16 January 2006, was appointed in his place.

The law of 28 December 2005, n. 262, as part of various measures to protect savings, introduces for the first time a term to the mandate of the governor and the members of the directorate. It also dealt with (article 19, paragraph 10) the issue of ownership of the capital of the Bank of Italy, providing for the redefinition of the Bank's shareholding structure by means of a government regulation to be issued within three years of the law's entry into force. This regulation should have governed the methods of transferring shares held by "subjects other than the State or other public bodies". The delegation made by law 262/2005, therefore, expired without the regulation being issued, but the right to ownership of the shares of the current participants is in any case safeguarded by a provision of the Bank's Statute. On the basis of law 262/2005, Mario Draghi becomes the first governor to have a term of six years, renewable once for a further six years.

== Missions and organization ==
=== Missions ===
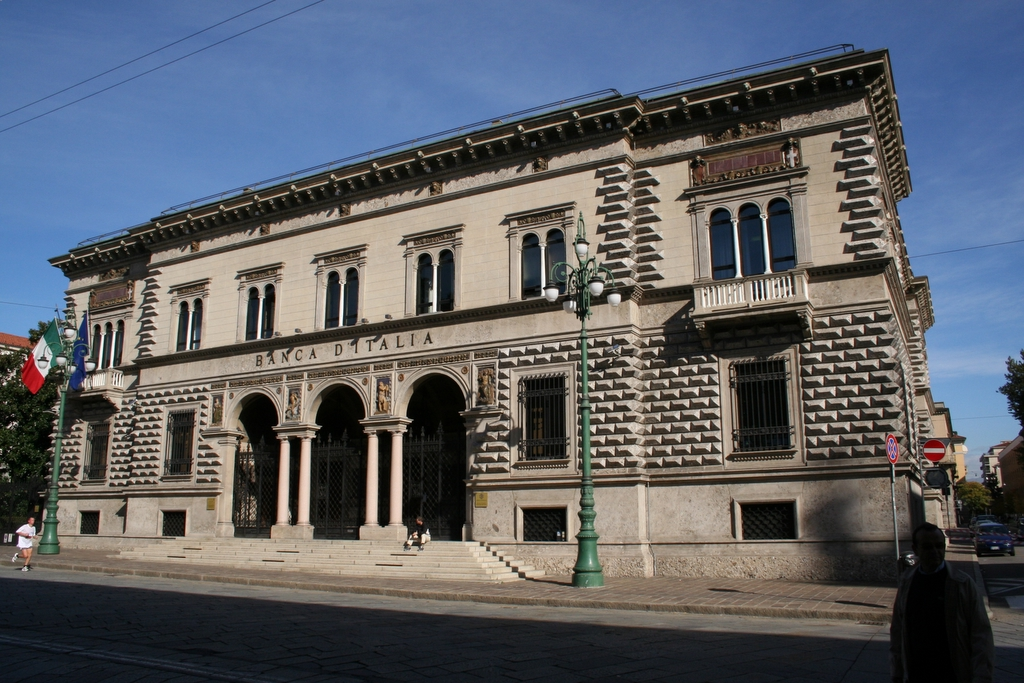
Bank of Italy building in Bergamo

After the charge of monetary and exchange rate policies was shifted in 1998 to the European Central Bank, within the European institutional framework, the bank implements the decisions, issues euro banknotes and withdraws and destroys worn pieces. The main function has thus become banking and financial supervision. The objective is to ensure the stability and efficiency of the system and compliance with rules and regulations; the bank pursues it through secondary legislation, controls and cooperation with governmental authorities.

Following a reform in 2005, which was prompted by takeover scandals, the bank has lost exclusive antitrust authority in the credit sector, which is now shared with the Italian Competition Authority (Italian: Autorità Garante della Concorrenza e del Mercato). Other functions include market supervision, oversight of the payment system and provision of settlement services, State treasury service, Central Credit Register, economic analysis and institutional consultancy. As of 2021, the Bank of Italy owned 2,451.8 tonnes of gold, the third-largest gold reserve in the world.

According to the TFEU, the Bank of Italy manages the Italian gold reserves.

=== Governing bodies ===
The bank's governing bodies are the General Meeting of Shareholders, the board of directors, the governor, the director general and three deputy directors-general; the last five constitute the directorate. The general meeting takes place yearly and with the purpose of approving accounts and appointing the auditors. The board of directors has administrative powers and is chaired by the governor (or by the director-general in his absence). Following a reform in 2005, the governor lost exclusive responsibility regarding decisions of external relevance (i.e. banking and financial supervision), which has been transferred to the directorate (by majority vote). The director-general is responsible for the day-to-day administration of the bank and acts as governor when absent. The board of auditors assesses the bank's administration and compliance with the law, regulations and statute.

=== Appointment ===
The directorate's term of office lasts six years and is renewable once. The appointment of the governor is the responsibility of the government, head of the board of directors, with the approval of the president (formally a decree of the president). The board of directors is elected by the shareholders according to the bank statute. On 25 October 2011, Silvio Berlusconi nominated Ignazio Visco to be the bank's new governor to replace Mario Draghi when he left to become president of the European Central Bank in November.

== Currency and coinage ==
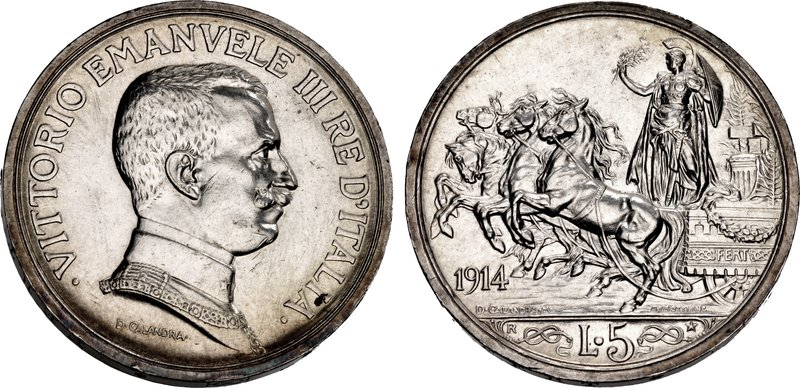
Silver 5 lire coin, 1914, with the personification of Italy standing on a quadriga depicted on the reverse

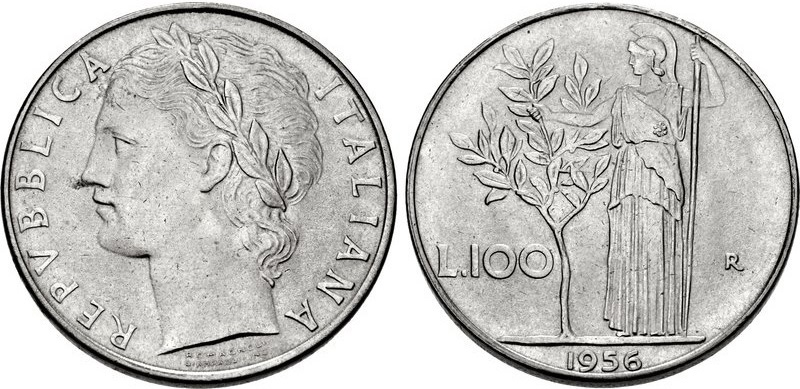
100 lire coin, 1956, with goddess Minerva holding an olive tree and a long spear depicted on the reverse

Italy has a long history of different coinage types, which spans thousands of years. Since Italy has been for centuries divided into many historic states, they all had different coinage systems, but when the country became unified in 1861, the Italian lira came into place, and was used until 2002. The term originates from libra, the largest unit of the Carolingian monetary system used in Western Europe and elsewhere from the 8th to the 20th century.

Italian lira was introduced by the Napoleonic Kingdom of Italy in 1807 at par with the French franc, and was subsequently adopted by the different states that would eventually form the Kingdom of Italy in 1861. It was subdivided into 100 centesimi (singular: centesimo), which means "hundredths" or "cents". The lira was also the currency of the Albanian Kingdom from 1941 to 1943. There was no standard sign or abbreviation for the Italian lira. The abbreviations Lit. (standing for Lira italiana) and L. (standing for Lira) and the signs ₤ or £ were all accepted representations of the currency. Banks and financial institutions, including the Bank of Italy, often used Lit. and this was regarded internationally as the abbreviation for the Italian lira.

Handwritten documents and signs at market stalls would often use "£" or "₤", while coins used "L." Italian postage stamps mostly used the word lire in full but some (such as the 1975 monuments series) used "L." The name of the currency could also be written in full as a prefix or a suffix (e.g. Lire 100,000 or 100,000 lire). The ISO 4217 currency code for the lira was ITL. The Italian lira was the official unit of currency in Italy until 1 January 1999, when it was replaced by the euro (euro coins and notes were not introduced until 2002). Old lira denominated currency ceased to be legal tender on 28 February 2002. The conversion rate is 1,936.27 lire to the euro. All lira banknotes in use immediately before the introduction of the euro, as all post WW2 coins, were still exchangeable for euros in all branches of the Bank of Italy until 28 February 2012.

With the authentic interpretation of the 2026 Budget Law, in paragraph 2, it is definitively clarified that "the gold reserves managed and held by the Bank of Italy, as recorded in its balance sheet, belong to the Italian people". The law did not clarify, however, the part of the gold reserves that is publicly owned and the amount of gold that is privately owned, subtracted from a 'power-tunnel' mine of the collective domain in the years '53-'62 approximately. With the complaint to the Attorney General of the Supreme Court, in its own interest and in the interest of the Italian people, the exponential body of the collective dominion of the ancient originals in the Reno di Lei Valley, pursuant to Law 168/2017, which boasts the right of ownership already legally revised, on no. 946 tons of gold in bullion held by the Bank of Italy SpA, in US Deposit, presented the complaint for false accounting and embezzlement of the consideration for the loan of use. In fact, despite the law of authentic interpretation, the Bank of Italy SpA continues to indicate the gold reserves in the assets of its balance sheet instead of in the order accounts among the deposits c/third parties.

== Shareholders ==
Banca d'Italia had 300,000 shares with a nominal value of €25,000. Originally scattered around the banks of Italy, the shares now accumulated due to the merger of the banks since the 1990s and also a number of pension and social security institutions. The status of the bank states that a minimum of 54% of profits would go to the Italian government, and only a maximum of 6% of profits would be distributed as dividends according to share ratios. Even so, the Bank of Italy stands out among central banks in the Eurosystem as having no state ownership (the National Bank of Belgium and Bank of Greece have mixed ownership).

As of early 2024, the 15 largest shareholders represented slightly over half of the bank's equity, namely UniCredit (5.0 percent), Cassa nazionale di previdenza ed assistenza per gli ingegneri ed architetti liberi professionisti (4.9 percent), Fondazione ENPAM (4.9 percent), Cassa nazionale di previdenza e assistenza forense (4.9 percent), Intesa Sanpaolo (4.9 percent), Cassa nazionale di previdenza e assistenza dei dottori commercialisti (3.7 percent), BPER Banca (3.3 percent), ICCREA Banca (3.1 percent), Generali Italia (3.0 percent), the National Institute for Social Security (3.0 percent), Istituto nazionale per l'assicurazione contro gli infortuni sul lavoro (3.0 percent), Cassa di Sovvenzioni e Risparmio fra il Personale della Banca d'Italia (3.0 percent), Cassa di Risparmio di Asti (3.0 percent), Banca Nazionale del Lavoro (2.8 percent), and Crédit Agricole Italia (2.8 percent). The remaining 49 percent were dispersed among 157 shareholders, mainly banks and banking foundations.

== See also ==
- Banking in Italy
- Economy of Italy
- Istituto Poligrafico e Zecca dello Stato
- Governor of the Bank of Italy
- List of central banks
- List of financial supervisory authorities by country
- List of banks in Italy
