= Banca Toscana di Credito =

Former Italian bank

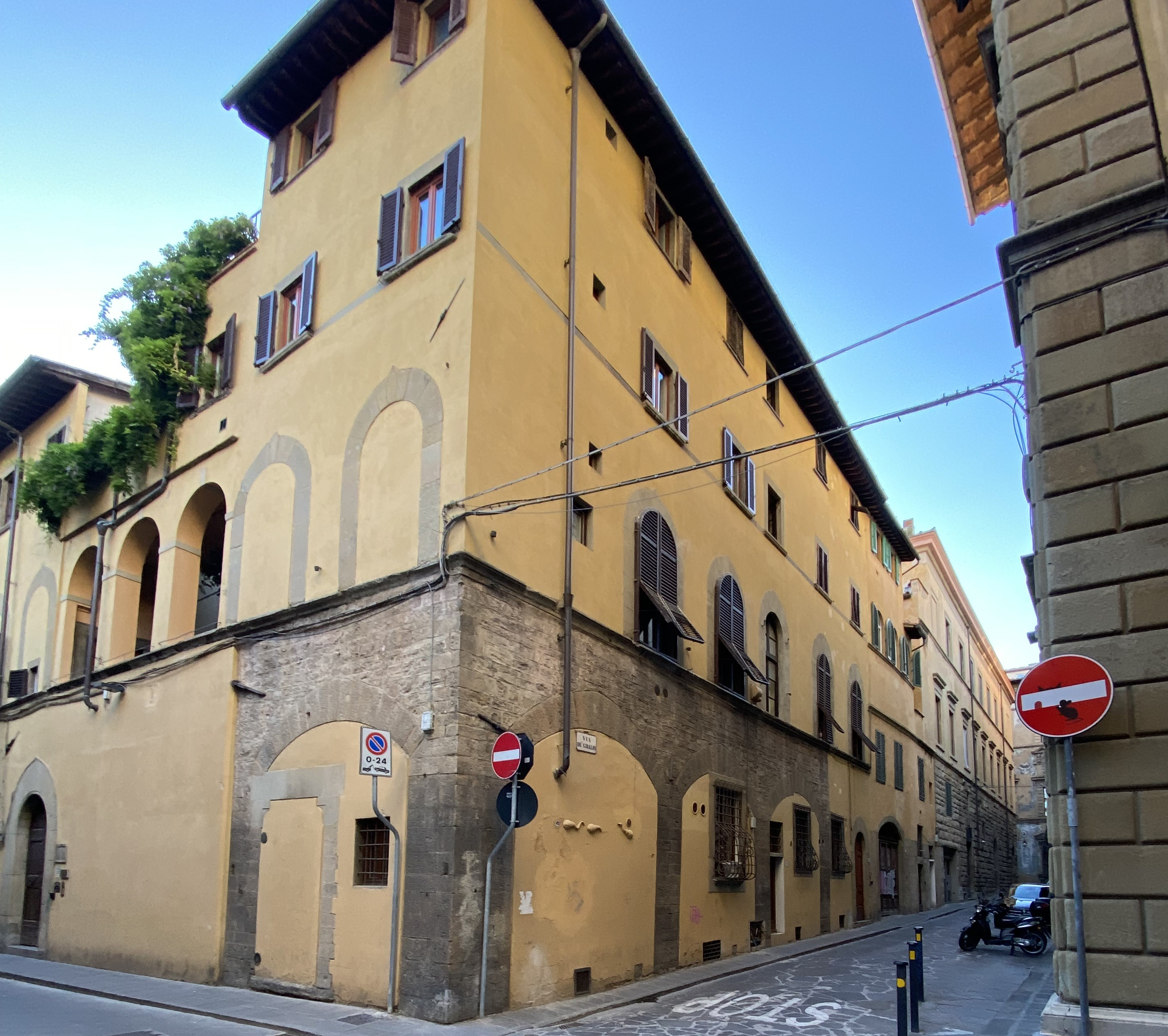
- Building at Via de' Giraldi 11 in Florence, the bank's head office before the 1893 merger
- Company type: Private company
- Industry: Financial services
- Founded: May 12, 1860
- Defunct: 1893
- Fate: Merged
- Successor: Bank of Italy
- Headquarters: Florence, Italy
- Products: Bank note issuing, banking services,

The Banca Toscana di Credito per le Industrie e il Commercio (lit. 'Tuscan Credit Bank for Industry and Trade') was an Italian bank of issue, founded 12 May 1860 in Livorno. In 1893 it merged with several of its peers to form the Bank of Italy, Italy's central bank.

== History ==
It was founded on 12 May 1860 by the Livorno count Pietro Bastogi, with the aim of providing a basis for the financing of important industries such as, for example, the Italian Southern Railways Company. The new venture only started operations on 15 September 1863, after having assembled a critical mass of initial shareholders, and opened for retail business on 15 December 1863.

The bank issued notes of 20, 50, 100, 200, 500, and 1000 liras, all made by Bradbury Wilkinson and Company of London from 1864 to 1880. The initially planned denomination of 5000 lire never came into circulation. The notes of the Banca Toscana di Credito have become extremely rare and almost never appear on the collectors' market.

== See also ==
- National Bank of the Kingdom of Italy
- List of banks in Italy
