= Banca di Credito Italiano =

Former Italian bank

The Banca di Credito Italiano (lit. 'Italian Credit Bank') was a significant investment bank in late 19th-century Italy. It was founded in Turin on 24 April 1863 as the Italian affiliate of Paris-based Crédit Industriel et Commercial, itself recently established in 1859. As such, it was one of the earliest joint-stock banks established in the new Kingdom of Italy. In 1865 it relocated its head office to Florence, the kingdom's temporary capital, and in 1874 to Milan. In 1892, it was acquired by the Credito Mobiliare, which however went bankrupt the next year. Its shares were quoted on the Milan Stock Exchange from 1863 to 1893.

== See also ==
- Credito Mobiliare
- Banca Generale
- Banco di Sconto e Sete
- List of banks in Italy
