= List of solved missing person cases (2020s) =

This is a list of solved missing person cases in the 2020s.

== 2020 ==
Date	Person(s)	Age	Country of disappearance	Circumstances	Outcome	Time spent missing or unconfirmed
12 January 2020	Keane Mulready-Woods	17	Ireland	Mulready-Woods was an Irish teenager from Drogheda, County Louth who disappeared on 12 January 2020. His dismembered remains were found in separate locations, including a burning car, over the course of several weeks beginning 13 January.	Murdered	1 day
31 January 2020	Mark Frerichs	57	Afghanistan	Frerichs is an American civil engineer who was kidnapped by the Taliban-affiliated Haqqani network on 31 January 2020. His status remained unknown for two years until 1 April 2022, when a video released by the Taliban showed Frerichs pleading for help. On 19 September 2022, Frerichs was released by the Taliban-led government of the Islamic Emirate of Afghanistan in exchange for Bashir Noorzai.	Found alive	2 years 7 months
February 2020	Megan Khung Yu Wai	4	Singapore	Four-year-old Megan Khung Yu Wai was reported missing by her maternal grandmother on 20 July 2020. The police managed to establish that the girl had died in February 2020 and her body was burned three months later in May 2020. Three suspects, consisting of the girl's birth mother, the mother's boyfriend and a friend of the couple, were charged with murder and disposal of Khung's corpse.	Murdered	5 months
6 February 2020	Chen Qiushi	34	China	Qiushi, a lawyer and citizen journalist, was abducted by Chinese government officials on 6 February 2020, due to his coverage of the 2019–2020 Hong Kong protests and the mishandling of the COVID-19 pandemic in the country. In September 2020, a government agency reported that he was under strict surveillance at his parents' home.	Found alive	7 months
23 February 2020	Mazen al-Hamada	47	Syria	Mazen al-Hamada, an activist from Deir ez-Zor, was a victim of enforced disappearance when he was kidnapped by Syrian security officials on 23 February 2020. His body was found in Sednaya Prison on 9 December 2024. He is believed to have been executed seven days before his body was discovered.	Murdered	4 years and 10 months
26 February 2020	Li Zehua	24–25	China	Chinese journalist and rapper who was detained by government officials while attempting to locate journalist Chen Qiushi. Two months later, he posted a video saying that he had been temporarily arrested by police and later released.	Found alive	2 months
20 March 2020	Gretchen Anthony	51	United States	51-year-old Gretchen Stoughton Anthony was an American woman from Jupiter, Florida, who was last seen alive on 20 March 2020. Her estranged husband, David Ethan Anthony, was arrested a week later and charged with her murder and kidnapping. In exchange for having his charges reduced, David admitted to entering Gretchen's home in Abacoa, Florida, and stabbing her to death in her garage. David also disclosed the location of Gretchen's remains, which were found in a wooded area near her home on 21 December 2020.	Murdered	9 months
26 March 2020	Soumaïla Cissé	71	Mali	Malian Minister of Finance from 1993 to 2000 and president for the Union for the Republic and Democracy who was abducted by Jama'at Nasr al-Islam wal Muslimin jihadists on 26 March 2020. There was no news of his condition, until his release on 6 October 2020.	Found alive	6 months
22 April 2020	Vanessa Guillén	20	United States	Guillén was a 20-year-old woman who was serving in the United States Army at the time of her disappearance. She had told her family and close friends that she was being sexually harassed by a fellow soldier, but never made an official complaint to her chain of command. Guillén was last seen on 22 April 2020, at approximately 1:00 p.m. in the parking lot of her unit on Fort Hood, Texas. On 30 June 2020, authorities discovered human remains along the Leon River, in Belton, which after examination indicated that they were indeed Guillén's. The autopsy revealed the cause of death was due to bludgeoning.	Murdered	2 months 8 days
30 April 2020	Facundo Astudillo Castro	22–23	Argentina	Castro was an Argentine man who disappeared on 30 April 2020, during the COVID-19 pandemic after he was stopped by the police in Mayor Buratovich, Buenos Aires. Castro was found dead on 15 August 2020. Castro's death was revealed to be caused by drowning.	Drowned	107 days
15 May 2020	Luis Espinoza	31	Argentina	Espinoza was an Argentinian citizen who was shot and killed by police officers on 15 May 2020, who suspected that he participated in an illegal horse race. His body was then dumped in a ravine, and later located after his family members inquired about his disappearance. Several police officers have been charged with his murder.	Murdered	1 week
17 May 2020	Shad Gaspard	39	United States	On 17 May 2020, former WWE wrestler Shad Gaspard and his 10-year-old son went swimming at the Marina Del Rey Beach in California when both were caught in a rip current. Gaspard directed life guards to save his son first. His son was saved, but Gaspard had submerged underwater. Lifeguards at the beach, the U.S. Coast Guard, and the Los Angeles Fire Department searched for Gaspard until 7:30 p.m. that evening, when the search was called off. Three days later, on 20 May 2020, Gaspard's body was found on the beach and identified by the Los Angeles County coroner's office.	Drowned	3 days
6 June 2020	Bibaa Henry	46	United Kingdom	Two British women who disappeared while walking home from a party in north-west London on 6 June 2020. Although reported missing, the police allegedly showed little interest in searching for them; their families found their bodies in Fryent Country Park the next day. They were murdered by a man as a result of a "satanic pact". The case gained notoriety after it emerged that police officers who found the bodies took selfies with them.	Murdered	1 day
6 June 2020	Nicole Smallman	27	United Kingdom	Two British women who disappeared while walking home from a party in north-west London on 6 June 2020. Although reported missing, the police allegedly showed little interest in searching for them; their families found their bodies in Fryent Country Park the next day. They were murdered by a man as a result of a "satanic pact". The case gained notoriety after it emerged that police officers who found the bodies took selfies with them.	Murdered	1 day
9 June 2020	Oluwatoyin Salau	19	United States	Oluwatoyin Salau was a community activist from Tallahassee, Florida who was reported missing on 9 June 2020, and was found dead four days later after being murdered.	Murdered	4 days
8 July 2020	Naya Rivera	33	United States	Rivera, an American actress best known for her role on Glee, was declared missing after she went swimming with her 4-year-old son in Lake Piru, California, on 8 July 2020, and never returned. She was declared presumed dead in a drowning incident the next day, and her body was recovered on 13 July 2020. It is suspected that she and her son got caught in a current; she pushed her son onto their boat, but could not get up herself.	Drowned	5 days
9 July 2020	Park Won-soon	64	South Korea	Park was a South Korean politician, lawyer, and activist, and was the longest-serving mayor of Seoul. He disappeared on 9 July 2020, and was found dead a day later; it was revealed that he died by suicide.	Suicide	1 day
24 June 2020	İpek Er	18	Turkey	İpek Er was an 18-year-old Kurdish student from Batman who died on 18 August 2020, following a suicide attempt resulting from her kidnapping and repeated rape over a 20-day period of confinement the previous month.	Suicide	20 days
18 July 2020	Bernadette Walker	17	United Kingdom	Walker was a 17-year-old student at Peterborough College who disappeared on 18 July 2020. Her stepfather Scott Walker was convicted of murdering her and has since died in prison.	Murdered	1 year
13 July 2020	Brad Booth	45	United States	The Canadian professional poker player was reported missing on 30 July 2020, after telling his roommates in Reno, Nevada that he was going camping on 13 July 2020. His family announced that Booth had been located "alive and well" on 16 September 2020.	Found alive	65 days
12 November 2020	Melissa Caddick	49	Australia	Australian financial advisor who vanished on 12 November 2020, amid allegations that she was running a Ponzi scheme. Her partial human remains were found floating in the ocean in February 2021, but cause of death is yet to be established.	Died (unknown cause)	4 months
November 2020	Esther Dingley	37	France	Dingley was an English hiker and blogger who disappeared during a solo trip through the Pyrenees. Partial remains were found in July 2021, and later confirmed by DNA examination to be Dingley's. She possibly died from slipping off a cliff.	Died (accidental fall)	8 months
13 December 2020	Jason Landry	21	United States	Landry disappeared after his car was found crashed and abandoned in Luling, Texas on 13 December 2020. He was driving home from college when the crash occurred. Landry's remains were found near the crash site on 8 September 2026 and were identified that same month.	Died (unknown cause)	6 years

== 2021 ==
Date	Person(s)	Age	Country of disappearance	Circumstances	Outcome	Time spent missing or unconfirmed
January 2021	Ali Sadpara	45	Pakistan	Ali Sadpara, John Snorri Sigurjónsson, and Juan Pablo Mohr Prieto were mountaineers who disappeared while ascending K2 in Karakoram mountain range. The three were last seen alive at the K2 Bottleneck. Their bodies were discovered by a Madison Mountaineering Sherpa Team on 26 July 2021.	Died (exposure or exhaustion)	171 days
January 2021	Juan Pablo Mohr Prieto	33	Pakistan	Ali Sadpara, John Snorri Sigurjónsson, and Juan Pablo Mohr Prieto were mountaineers who disappeared while ascending K2 in Karakoram mountain range. The three were last seen alive at the K2 Bottleneck. Their bodies were discovered by a Madison Mountaineering Sherpa Team on 26 July 2021.	Died (exposure or exhaustion)	171 days
January 2021	John Snorri Sigurjónsson	47	Pakistan	Ali Sadpara, John Snorri Sigurjónsson, and Juan Pablo Mohr Prieto were mountaineers who disappeared while ascending K2 in Karakoram mountain range. The three were last seen alive at the K2 Bottleneck. Their bodies were discovered by a Madison Mountaineering Sherpa Team on 26 July 2021.	Died (exposure or exhaustion)	171 days
4 January 2021	Peter Neumair	68	Italy	On 4 January 2021, an elderly couple Peter Neumair and Laura Perselli were reported missing from their home in South Tyrol, Italy. They were later found murdered by their son Benno Neumair.	Murdered	4 months
4 January 2021	Laura Perselli	63	Italy	On 4 January 2021, an elderly couple Peter Neumair and Laura Perselli were reported missing from their home in South Tyrol, Italy. They were later found murdered by their son Benno Neumair.	Murdered	1 month
February 2021	Ahmadullah	13–17	Pakistan	The four boys were last seen hunting for wild hare in the area of Janikhel, Pakistan, in early February 2021. On 21 March 2021, a shepherd's dog found their mutilated remains in a mass grave: one was beheaded, another shot and the final two stoned to death. Their deaths remain under investigation, and sparked a nationwide protest from family, relatives and locals, who are demanding tighter security against militants operating in the area and the capture of the boys' killers.	Murdered	3 weeks
February 2021	Atifullah	13–17	Pakistan	The four boys were last seen hunting for wild hare in the area of Janikhel, Pakistan, in early February 2021. On 21 March 2021, a shepherd's dog found their mutilated remains in a mass grave: one was beheaded, another shot and the final two stoned to death. Their deaths remain under investigation, and sparked a nationwide protest from family, relatives and locals, who are demanding tighter security against militants operating in the area and the capture of the boys' killers.	Murdered	3 weeks
February 2021	Mohammad Rahim	13–17	Pakistan	The four boys were last seen hunting for wild hare in the area of Janikhel, Pakistan, in early February 2021. On 21 March 2021, a shepherd's dog found their mutilated remains in a mass grave: one was beheaded, another shot and the final two stoned to death. Their deaths remain under investigation, and sparked a nationwide protest from family, relatives and locals, who are demanding tighter security against militants operating in the area and the capture of the boys' killers.	Murdered	3 weeks
February 2021	Razamullah	13–17	Pakistan	The four boys were last seen hunting for wild hare in the area of Janikhel, Pakistan, in early February 2021. On 21 March 2021, a shepherd's dog found their mutilated remains in a mass grave: one was beheaded, another shot and the final two stoned to death. Their deaths remain under investigation, and sparked a nationwide protest from family, relatives and locals, who are demanding tighter security against militants operating in the area and the capture of the boys' killers.	Murdered	3 weeks
24 February 2021	Louis Nix	29	United States	Louis Nix was an American professional football player who went missing on 24 February 2021, in Jacksonville, Florida, and was found dead three days later on 27 February.	Drowned	3 days
3 March 2021	Sarah Everard	33	United Kingdom	On the evening of 3 March 2021, Everard, a marketing executive living in Brixton Hill, disappeared after leaving a friend's house. Six days later, 48-year-old Metropolitan Police officer Wayne Couzens was arrested on suspicion of kidnapping Everard and was later rearrested on 10 March on suspicion of her murder when human remains were found near Ashford, Kent. The remains were confirmed to be Everard's on 12 March and Couzens was charged with her kidnap and murder later the same day. On 8 June 2021, Couzens pleaded guilty to kidnapping and raping her. On 9 July 2021, he pleaded guilty to murdering her.	Murdered	7 days
11 March 2021	Tehuel de la Torre	21	Argentina	A transgender man who disappeared from San Vicente, Buenos Aires. Luis Alberto Ramos was convicted of the murder in 2024 and sentenced to life in prison.	Murdered	Never found
27 April 2021	Olivia Zimmermann de Zárate	6	Spain	Kidnapped with her sister, Anna, by their biological father Tomás Antonio Gimeno Casañas on the island of Tenerife, Spain on 27 April 2021. He allegedly murdered both girls at his house in Igueste de Candelaria and dumped both bodies in the ocean; Olivia's was found off the coast of Santa Cruz de Tenerife on 10 June. Her sister's body has not been found.	Murdered	45 days
5 May 2021	James Dean	35	United Kingdom	Dean, an English footballer who played as a forward for several teams since beginning his career in 2003, was reported missing on 6 May 2021, after he was last seen the day prior. Three days later, his body was located by police in Oswaldtwistle. Foul play was ruled out in his death.	Drowned	4 days
8 May 2021	Skilyr Hicks	23	United States	American singer and songwriter, best noted for her appearance on the eighth season of America's Got Talent. A repeat runaway with possible mental health issues, she went missing from her home in North Augusta, South Carolina, on 8 May 2021, only to be found unharmed days later. She died later the same year.	Found alive	5 days
9 May 2021	Tristyn Bailey	13	United States	On the morning of 9 May 2021, 13-year-old cheerleader Tristyn Bailey from St. Johns County, Florida, was reported missing by her family. Later that day, Bailey's stabbed body was found by a resident in a wooded area. Her classmate Aiden Fucci was arrested for her murder and sentenced to life in prison.	Murdered	1 day
15 May 2021	Ken Kadokura	47	Japan	Japanese professional baseball pitcher Ken Kadokura was reportedly missing since 15 May 2021. On 6 June 2021, his wife reported that he returned to his home.	Found alive	22 days
28 May 2021	Esther Brown	67	United Kingdom	Scottish pensioner reported missing on 28 May 2021. She was found dead in her flat in Glasgow four days later. A week after her body was discovered, paroled sex offender Jason Graham was arrested and confessed to her rape and murder. He pleaded guilty, and was sentenced to 19 years in prison.	Murdered	3 days
11 June 2021	Mee Kuen Chong	67	United Kingdom	Chong was murdered by neighbour Jemma Mitchell for financial gain on 11 June 2021. The murder occurred at her North London address. Mitchell later attempted to forge Chong's will to make Mitchell the primary beneficiary. Her body was disposed of in Salcombe, Devon, and was discovered on 27 June. Mitchell was later sentenced to life imprisonment.	Murdered	16 days
28 June 2021	Lauren Cho	30	United States	Lauren Cho was last seen in the area between Morongo Valley and Yucca Valley, California walking away from her friend's converted bus after an argument on 28 June 2021. On 9 October 2021, investigators found unidentified human remains in the rugged terrain of the open desert of Yucca Valley, during their search for Cho. On 28 October 2021, investigators confirmed that the remains found on 9 October belonged to Cho.	Died (unknown cause)	3 months, 11 days
18 July 2021	Julius Ssekitoleko	21	Japan	Ugandan Olympic weightlifter who went missing while attending the 2020 Summer Olympics in Tokyo on 18 July 2021. He was located in Nagoya two days later, explaining that he wished to start a new life.	Found alive	2 days
13 August 2021	Kylen Schulte	24	United States	Married couple who were shot to death by an unidentified offender while camping in Moab, Utah, on 13 August 2021, and were later declared missing. In December 2022, the case was closed and Adam Pinkusiewicz was cited as the murderer.	Murdered	5 days
13 August 2021	Crystal Turner	38	United States	Married couple who were shot to death by an unidentified offender while camping in Moab, Utah, on 13 August 2021, and were later declared missing. In December 2022, the case was closed and Adam Pinkusiewicz was cited as the murderer.	Murdered	5 days
27 August 2021	Gabby Petito	22	United States	Gabby Petito was last seen with her fiancé Brian Laundrie on 27 August 2021, at a Tex-Mex-style restaurant in Jackson, Wyoming. She had told her mother a few days earlier that they were near Grand Teton National Park. On September 11 Petito was declared missing, and on September 19 she was found dead in the Bridger–Teton National Forest. An autopsy found she was killed by strangulation. Brian Laundrie admitted to her murder in a journal before taking his own life.	Murdered	23 days
9 September 2021	Tanya Fear	31	United States	British actress and comedian who was reported missing from her Los Angeles apartment on 9 September 2021. She was later found unharmed, having received treatment at a local hospital for an undisclosed reason.	Found alive	4 days
17 September 2021	Brian Laundrie	23	United States	Laundrie was reported missing on 17 September, a few days after he left his parents home in North Port, Florida. His remains were found on October 20 in Myakkahatchee Creek Environmental Park, and it was later found that he had committed suicide. In a journal found with his remains, Laundrie admitted to killing Gabby Petito.	Suicide	1 month
5 October 2021	Cleo Smith	4	Australia	Australian toddler who disappeared from a campsite in Gascoyne, Western Australia, whilst camping with her family on 5 October 2021. She was found in a house in Carnarvon, Western Australia.	Found alive	18 days
November 2021	Peng Shuai	35	China	Chinese professional tennis player who vanished off social media in November 2021, shortly after accusing a high-ranking Chinese politician of sexual assault. She reappeared two weeks later, claiming that her post had been misunderstood and that she had never actually accused anyone.	Found alive	2 weeks
2 December 2021	Hanifa Abubakar	5	Nigeria	Hanifa Abubakar, a girl from Nassarawa, Kano State, Nigeria, was kidnapped on 2 December 2021, and found dead on 20 January 2022.	Murdered	49 days
9 December 2021	Thomas Phillips	34	New Zealand	The father and his three children had previously been considered missing for 18 days in September 2021 before emerging from the bush unharmed. After Thomas was charged for wasting police resources, the family disappeared again on 9 December 2021. Thomas was killed in a shootout with police on 8 September 2025 and the children were recovered unharmed.	Died (police shootout)	3 years, 8 months and 30 days
9 December 2021	Phillips children	6, 7 & 9	New Zealand	The father and his three children had previously been considered missing for 18 days in September 2021 before emerging from the bush unharmed. After Thomas was charged for wasting police resources, the family disappeared again on 9 December 2021. Thomas was killed in a shootout with police on 8 September 2025 and the children were recovered unharmed.	Found alive	3 years, 8 months and 30 days
12 December 2021	Kamarie Holland	5	United States	Holland was a five-year-old child abducted from her Columbus, Georgia, home on 12 December 2021, by Jeremy Williams. She was sexually assaulted and murdered by strangulation in Phenix City, Alabama, on December 13. The abduction and sexual assault was committed upon the agreement that Holland's mother, Kristy Siple—who staged a child abduction scenario—would be paid $1,300 by Williams to engage in sex with Holland. Siple was ultimately sentenced to 20 years' imprisonment; Williams was found guilty of four counts of capital murder. He was sentenced to death and executed on 13 August 2026.	Murdered	3 days

== 2022 ==
Date	Person(s)	Age	Country of disappearance	Circumstances	Outcome	Time spent missing or unconfirmed
27 November 2022	Hans-Joachim Lohre	Unknown	Mali	German Roman Catholic priest and missionary who was kidnapped by unknown assailants in Mali.	Found alive	1 year
6 January 2022	Shane O'Connor	17	Ireland	Shane O'Connor, the teenage son of Irish musician Sinéad O'Connor, had disappeared from Newbridge, County Kildare on 6 January 2022, and was found dead just two days later.	Suicide	2 days
13 January 2022	Charlise Mutten	9	Australia	Charlise Mutten was an Australian girl who disappeared while visiting the estate of her mother's fiancé, Justin Stein, in Mount Wilson. Her body was found a few days later, and Stein has subsequently been charged in her death.	Murdered	4 days
February 2022	Rebecca Contois	24	Canada	Contois was an Indigenous Canadian woman murdered by Canadian serial killer Jeremy Skibicki. She was last seen alive in the first week of February 2022. Her remains were found discarded in a garbage bin near an apartment complex in North Kildonan, Winnipeg, on 16 May. Skibicki was found guilty of Contois' and three other women's murders in July 2024.	Murdered	3 months
13 February 2022	Lindsey Pearlman	43	United States	American actress, voice actress and animal rights activist. Pearlman was reported missing to the Los Angeles Police Department on 13 February 2022; her body was discovered in her car on 18 February. The cause of her death was determined to be suicide via intentional overdose of sodium nitrite.	Suicide	5 days
26 February 2022	Oluwabamise Ayanwole	22	Nigeria	Ayanwole was a Nigerian woman who was abducted after boarding a BRT in Lagos, Nigeria. Her nude body was found nine days later, close to Carter Bridge on Lagos Island. The driver of the bus, Andrew Nice Omininikoron, was later arrested on suspicion of her rape and murder.	Murdered	9 days
12 March 2022	Naomi Irion	19	United States	Irion was abducted from a parking lot in Fernley, Nevada, by 41-year-old Troy Driver on 12 March 2022. Her body was discovered in Churchill County on 29 March. Irion had been shot to death. Driver committed suicide while in custody prior to his trial for her murder.	Murdered	17 days
13 March 2022	Maksim Yevhenovych Levin	40	Ukraine	Levin was a Ukrainian photographer killed by Russian armed forces during a mission to document the consequences of the Russian invasion of Ukraine in Kyiv Oblast. He is believed to have died on 13 March; his body was found near a village on 1 April 2022.	Murdered	19 days
April 2022	Gonzalo Lira	53	Ukraine	Gonzalo Lira was a male Chilean-American filmmaker, novelist and commentator who disappeared for a short time in April 2022 after he claimed that he had been detained by the Security Service of Ukraine, after he had resurfaced. He later died in a Ukrainian prison in January 2024.	Found alive	1 week
24 April 2022	Lily Peters	10	United States	Lily Peters was an American girl from Chippewa Falls, Wisconsin, who after not arriving home on 24 April 2022, was reported missing by her father and was found dead the next day after being killed.	Murdered	1 day
25 April 2022	Aguil Chut-Deng	55	Australia	Aguil Chut-Deng Acouth, who was also known as Aguil Chut-Deng and Aguil de'Chut Deng, a South Sudanese activist and revolutionary, was found dead on 26 April 2022 in a wooded area in Brisbane after being reported missing a day earlier.	Suicide	1 day
26 May 2022	Emmeril Kahn Mumtadz	22	Switzerland	Emmeril Kahn Mumtadz, the son of West Java Governor Ridwan Kamil, disappeared after being swept away at the Aare River's current in Bern, Switzerland on 26 May 2022. He was presumed dead eight days later by his family. His body was found on 9 June at the Engehalde Dam.	Drowned	2 weeks
5 June 2022	Dom Phillips	57	Brazil	Dom Phillips was a British journalist who went missing in Brazil in June 2022, along with his guide, Bruno Pereira. Phillips was writing a book on the Amazon rainforest and had travelled to Brazil to meet locals. Their disappearances were first reported on June 5 when their boat did not arrive at an expected meeting point near the Peru border. On 16 June, eleven days thereafter, a Brazilian man later named as Amarildo da Costa de Oliveira admitted to murdering both men and led police to the site where he buried the bodies. Police then arrested Oliveira and his brother Oseney. One day later, on 17 June, officials confirmed that Phillips' body had been identified by dental records. Pereira's body was identified the following day on 18 June, and a third suspect named Jeferson da Silva Lima (also known as Pelado da Dinha) was arrested after turning himself in to a police station in Atalaia do Norte. Officials later stated that Phillips and Pereira were shot with hunting ammunition.	Murdered	12 days
5 June 2022	Bruno Pereira	41	Brazil		Murdered	13 days
10 June 2022	Ezra Miller	29	United States	Miller, an American actor, and Iron Eyes—a Native American activist—disappeared on 10 June 2022. Both were located in August.	Found alive	2 months
10 June 2022	Tokata Iron Eyes	18–19	United States	Miller, an American actor, and Iron Eyes—a Native American activist—disappeared on 10 June 2022. Both were located in August.	Found alive	2 months
24 July 2022	Dawn Dumont	48	Canada	A Canadian writer and former lawyer and journalist who staged her own disappearance and death on 24 July 2022. Dumont and her child were found alive in Oregon on 5 August.	Found alive	12 days
26 July 2022	Susana Morales	16	United States	A 16-year-old high school student from Gwinnett County, Georgia, who disappeared while walking home from a friend's home. Her family instigated an exhaustive search for her. Police initially investigated her as a runaway, but on 6 February 2023, over six months after her disappearance, a man found her nude skeletonized body in the woods. Her cause of death has never been determined, but a coroner determined that the circumstances surrounding her discovery suggested she was murdered. A Doraville police officer, Miles Bryant, was promptly arrested for her kidnapping and murder; he was convicted and sentenced to life without parole. Prosecutors theorized she was likely murdered within four hours of her abduction on 26 July 2022.	Murdered	6 months, 11 days
20 August 2022	Luke Bell	32	United States	Luke Bell was an American country singer-songwriter and musician who disappeared on 20 August 2022, in Tucson, Arizona, and was found dead nine days later. In September, it was revealed that he died from a fentanyl overdose on 26 August.	Died (overdose)	9 days
16 September 2022	Tom Marsh	60	Atacama Desert, Chile	60-year-old astronomer and astrophysicist Tom Marsh disappeared while visiting the La Silla Observatory in Chile on 16 September 2022. His body was discovered in the Atacama Desert on 10 November 2022.	Died (cause still under investigation)	55 days
15 October 2022	Theophilus London	35	United States	Theophilus London, a Trinidadian-born American rapper, was reported missing by his family in December 2022. London had been last contacted that July, stopped updating his social media accounts the same month, and was last seen in Los Angeles on 15 October. London was located by his family on 4 January 2023.	Found alive	2 months, 21 days
27 November 2022	Hamish Kilgour	65	New Zealand	Hamish Kilgour was the drummer and co-founder of The Clean, an influential New Zealand indie rock band. Kilgour was last seen at a shopping plaza in Christchurch on 27 November 2022, and was reported missing by his family on 1 December. Kilgour's death was announced by Christchurch police on 6 December.	Suicide	10 days

== 2023 ==
Date	Person(s)	Age	Country of disappearance	Circumstances	Outcome	Time spent missing or unconfirmed
1 January 2023	Ana Walshe	39	United States	A 39-year-old Serbian-American real estate executive murdered by her husband, Brian, sometime on 1 January 2023. Her husband was charged with both her murder and disinterring a body without authority on 18 January. He was found guilty in 2025. Ana's body has never been recovered.	Murdered	Not found
5 January 2023	Constance Marten	35	United Kingdom	A British couple went missing on 5 January 2023, when their car was found abandoned and on fire near Bolton. They were found on 27 February 2023, when they were arrested in Brighton. They went missing with their newborn baby, who was believed to have been born a couple days earlier, but were found without their baby . After the couple were found without their baby, an extensive search encompassing around 90 sq mi (230 km^{2}) involving over 200 police officers took place. A baby's remains were found almost 48 hours after the search began, on 1 March 2023, wrapped in a plastic bag and hidden inside a shed on an allotment in Hollingbury, Brighton, near where the couple were arrested. The couple were charged with multiple crimes including causing or allowing the death of a child and manslaughter by gross negligence, and each sentenced to 14 years in prison.	Found alive	53 days
5 January 2023	Mark Gordon	48	United Kingdom		Found alive	53 days
5 January 2023	Baby A	1–2 months	United Kingdom		Died (negligence)	55 days
13 January 2023	Julian Sands	65	United States	Julian Sands was a British film and television actor. On 13 January 2023, just over a week after his 65th birthday, Sands went hiking in the San Gabriel Mountains northeast of Los Angeles. He was reported missing later that day after severe storms hit the area and he failed to return home. Sands' car was found five days later near the area he was reported missing from. On 24 June 2023, hikers reported finding a body in the area near where Sands disappeared, and the remains were confirmed as Sands' three days later on 27 June.	Died (unknown cause)	5 months, 14 days
23 January 2023	Jeff Machado	44	Brazil	Jeff Machado was a Brazilian actor and journalist who went missing in January 2023 in Rio de Janeiro in the neighborhood of Campo Grande. He was found dead on 22 May 2023 after being found buried in a trunk after being murdered allegedly by Bruno de Souza Rodrigues and Jeander Vinicius da Silva Braga, with the possibility of more involved.	Murdered	5 months
27 January 2023	Nicola Bulley	45	United Kingdom	Nicola Bulley was reported missing on the morning of 27 January 2023. She had taken her dog for a walk near the River Wyre, and her dog and mobile phone—still connected to a work Microsoft Teams call—were found but there was no trace of Bulley. Police hypothesised that she had fallen into the river; her body was recovered approximately one mile (1.6 km) downstream on February 19.	Drowned	23 days
21 February 2023	Abby Choi Tin-fung	28	Hong Kong	On 24 February 2023, three days after her disappearance, the headless corpse of 28-year-old Abby Choi Tin-fung, a media personality and influencer, was discovered at a Tai Po village in Hong Kong. Reportedly, some of her body parts were hidden in a refrigerator and some were cooked. The police therefore classified the case as murder. In total, seven suspects, including Choi's ex-husband, were arrested in connection to the murder.	Murdered	3 days
2 March 2023	Stefán Arnar Gunnarsson	45	Iceland	An Icelandic handball coach and player. Gunnarsson was reported missing on 2 March 2023. His body was found washed ashore on a beach in Reykjanesbær on 2 April. He had died of drowning in an apparent suicide.	Drowned	1 month
13 March 2023	Elizabeth Tsurkov	36	Iraq	Elizabeth Tsurkov is a Russian-Israeli researcher who was kidnapped in Baghdad in March 2023 while conducting doctoral research in Iraq. She was held hostage by the group Kata'ib Hezbollah for 903 days before her release on 9 September 2025. She is currently a doctoral student at Princeton University.	Found alive	2 years, 5 months, and 32 days
11 May 2023	David Mitogo	32	Spain	A forward for the Equatorial Guinea national football team. Mitogo disappeared close to the river Minho. His body was recovered from the river Avia two weeks later.	Died (unknown cause)	2 weeks
28 May 2023	Giulia Tramontano	29	Italy	A missing pregnant woman was reported missing in Milan on 28 May 2023. Three days later her body was discovered and her boyfriend was found guilty of the murder.	Murdered	3 days
2 June 2023	Cecilia Strzyzowski	28	Argentina	Strzyzowski was a 28-year-old Argentine woman who was allegedly murdered in an act of femicide by up to six individuals including her partner, César Sena, on 2 June 2023. Crushed and charred bones believed to belong to Strzyzowski were later discovered in the Tragadero River, close to Sena's home, but could not be conclusively identified. However, extensive traces of blood discovered in Sena's house was determined on 11 July to source from her.	Murdered	1 month
17 June 2023	Celine Cremer	31	Australia	Cremer was a Belgian national who went missing after departing on a solo hike to Philosopher Falls near Waratah in Tasmania. Cremer's remains were found more than two years after her disappearance by private searchers near and in the Arthur River.	Found dead	2 years, 7 months
18 June 2023	Paul-Henri Nargeolet	77	Atlantic Ocean	Five people perished on 18 June 2023 when the submersible Titan imploded near the wreck of the Titanic. On 22 June, following the discovery of a debris field approximately 490 metres (1,610 ft) from the bow of the Titanic, OceanGate confirmed the deaths of all five passengers. A subsequent United States Coast Guard conference attributed the implosion of the Titan to a catastrophic loss of the pressure hull.	Died (implosion)	4 days
18 June 2023	Shahzada Dawood	48	Atlantic Ocean	Five people perished on 18 June 2023 when the submersible Titan imploded near the wreck of the Titanic. On 22 June, following the discovery of a debris field approximately 490 metres (1,610 ft) from the bow of the Titanic, OceanGate confirmed the deaths of all five passengers. A subsequent United States Coast Guard conference attributed the implosion of the Titan to a catastrophic loss of the pressure hull.	Died (implosion)	4 days
18 June 2023	Hamish Harding	58	Atlantic Ocean	Five people perished on 18 June 2023 when the submersible Titan imploded near the wreck of the Titanic. On 22 June, following the discovery of a debris field approximately 490 metres (1,610 ft) from the bow of the Titanic, OceanGate confirmed the deaths of all five passengers. A subsequent United States Coast Guard conference attributed the implosion of the Titan to a catastrophic loss of the pressure hull.	Died (implosion)	4 days
18 June 2023	Suleman Dawood	19	Atlantic Ocean	Five people perished on 18 June 2023 when the submersible Titan imploded near the wreck of the Titanic. On 22 June, following the discovery of a debris field approximately 490 metres (1,610 ft) from the bow of the Titanic, OceanGate confirmed the deaths of all five passengers. A subsequent United States Coast Guard conference attributed the implosion of the Titan to a catastrophic loss of the pressure hull.	Died (implosion)	4 days
18 June 2023	Stockton Rush	61	Atlantic Ocean	Five people perished on 18 June 2023 when the submersible Titan imploded near the wreck of the Titanic. On 22 June, following the discovery of a debris field approximately 490 metres (1,610 ft) from the bow of the Titanic, OceanGate confirmed the deaths of all five passengers. A subsequent United States Coast Guard conference attributed the implosion of the Titan to a catastrophic loss of the pressure hull.	Died (implosion)	4 days
8 July 2023	Émile Soleil	2	France	Young boy who disappeared on 8 July 2023, during a stay at his grandparents house in the French commune of Le Vernet, Alpes-de-Haute-Provence, bodily remains were later found in a nearby forest.	Died (cause still under investigation)	266 days
19 July 2023	Yanfei Bao	44	New Zealand	A real estate agent who disappeared from a suburb of Christchurch on 19 July 2023; her body was discovered in a shallow grave by police on rural farmland near Lincoln on 30 July 2024. On 4 December 2024, Chinese national Tingjun Chao was convicted of Bao's murder.	Murdered	1 year
5 August 2023	Rachel Morin	37	United States	On 5 August 2023, Morin was murdered while hiking along the Ma and Pa Trail in Bel Air, Maryland by illegal immigrant Victor Martinez Hernandez. He was sentenced to life in prison.	Murdered	3 days
2 September 2023	Jonila Castro	21	Philippines	Two youth environmental activists disappeared in Orion, Bataan on 2 September 2023. They resurfaced two weeks later.	Found alive	17 days
2 September 2023	Jhed Tamano	22	Philippines	Two youth environmental activists disappeared in Orion, Bataan on 2 September 2023. They resurfaced two weeks later.	Found alive	17 days
23 September 2023	Lina Delsarte	15	France	Delsarte, a 15-year-old girl disappeared from her home in Saint-Blaise-la-Roche on 23 September 2023. She was later discovered murdered when her remains were discovered on 16 October 2024 in woods near Nevers.	Murdered	13 months
7 October 2023 See also: Gaza war hostage crisis	Shani Louk	22	Israel	Louk was a 22-year-old German-Israeli abducted by Hamas militants during the 7 October 2023 Nova music festival massacre. Footage of her abduction became one of the most viral videos of the Gaza war. On 30 October, the Israel Defense Forces informed Louk's relatives that a section of the petrous part of the temporal bone had been identified via DNA analysis as belonging to Louk, indicating she had likely died at the festival. Her remains were found on 17 May 2024, in the Gaza Strip.	Murdered	23 days
7 October 2023 See also: Gaza war hostage crisis	Farhan al-Qadi	52	Israel	A Negev Bedouin man kidnapped by Hamas militants on 7 October from Kibbutz Magen, Qadi was rescued from tunnels in southern Gaza in a joint operation by the Israel Defense Forces and Shin Bet on 27 August 2024.	Found alive	10 months, 20 days
7 October 2023 See also: Gaza war hostage crisis	Yarden Bibas	34	Israel	The Bibas family, which held multiple citizenship of Israel, Argentina, and Germany, were kidnapped on by Palestinian militants during the Nir Oz attacks. Yarden was held captive in Gaza, and was released on 1 February 2025, as part of the January 2025 Gaza war ceasefire. Hamas handed over the remains of his wife, Shiri, and two children, Ariel and Kfir, on 20 February 2025. There are contradictory claims of their killing from Israeli authorities and Hamas.	Found alive	1 year, 4 months, and 25 days
7 October 2023 See also: Gaza war hostage crisis	Shiri Bibas	32	Israel	The Bibas family, which held multiple citizenship of Israel, Argentina, and Germany, were kidnapped on by Palestinian militants during the Nir Oz attacks. Yarden was held captive in Gaza, and was released on 1 February 2025, as part of the January 2025 Gaza war ceasefire. Hamas handed over the remains of his wife, Shiri, and two children, Ariel and Kfir, on 20 February 2025. There are contradictory claims of their killing from Israeli authorities and Hamas.	Killed	1 year, 5 months, and 13 days
7 October 2023 See also: Gaza war hostage crisis	Ariel Bibas	4	Israel	The Bibas family, which held multiple citizenship of Israel, Argentina, and Germany, were kidnapped on by Palestinian militants during the Nir Oz attacks. Yarden was held captive in Gaza, and was released on 1 February 2025, as part of the January 2025 Gaza war ceasefire. Hamas handed over the remains of his wife, Shiri, and two children, Ariel and Kfir, on 20 February 2025. There are contradictory claims of their killing from Israeli authorities and Hamas.	Killed	1 year, 5 months, and 13 days
7 October 2023 See also: Gaza war hostage crisis	Kfir Bibas	9 months	Israel	The Bibas family, which held multiple citizenship of Israel, Argentina, and Germany, were kidnapped on by Palestinian militants during the Nir Oz attacks. Yarden was held captive in Gaza, and was released on 1 February 2025, as part of the January 2025 Gaza war ceasefire. Hamas handed over the remains of his wife, Shiri, and two children, Ariel and Kfir, on 20 February 2025. There are contradictory claims of their killing from Israeli authorities and Hamas.	Killed	1 year, 5 months, and 13 days
7 October 2023 See also: Gaza war hostage crisis	Rom Braslavski	19	Israel	Braslavski, a security guard at the Nova music festival, was taken captive by Hamas as part of the October 7 attacks. He was released on 13 October 2025, as part of the Gaza peace plan.	Found alive	2 years, 6 days
7 October 2023 See also: Gaza war hostage crisis	Hersh Goldberg-Polin	23	Israel	A 23-year-old American-Israeli abducted by Hamas militants from the Re'im music festival massacre. Goldberg-Polin is known to have been wounded prior to being taken captive. His body was recovered from a tunnel in Rafah in the Gaza Strip on 31 August 2024.	Murdered	10 months, 24 days
7 October 2023 See also: Gaza war hostage crisis	Romi Gonen	23	Israel	Romi Gonen is an Israeli woman who was abducted by Hamas on October 7th 2023 during the Nova music festival massacre. She was released on 19 January 2025, as part of the January 2025 Gaza war ceasefire.	Found alive	1 year, 3 months, and 12 days
7 October 2023 See also: Gaza war hostage crisis	Noa Argamani	26	Israel	Noa Argamani and Avinatan Or are an Israeli couple who were abducted by Hamas on October 7th 2023 during the Nova music festival massacre. On 8 June 2024, Argamani and three other hostages were rescued from Gaza in a joint operation by the Israel Defense Forces, Shin Bet, and the Israel Police. Or was released from Hamas captivity on 13 October 2025, as part of the third Gaza war ceasefire agreement.	Found alive	9 months, 1 day
7 October 2023 See also: Gaza war hostage crisis	Avinatan Or	30	Israel	Noa Argamani and Avinatan Or are an Israeli couple who were abducted by Hamas on October 7th 2023 during the Nova music festival massacre. On 8 June 2024, Argamani and three other hostages were rescued from Gaza in a joint operation by the Israel Defense Forces, Shin Bet, and the Israel Police. Or was released from Hamas captivity on 13 October 2025, as part of the third Gaza war ceasefire agreement.	Found alive	2 years, 6 days
7 October 2023 See also: Gaza war hostage crisis	Alon Ohel	22	Israel	Alon Ohel is an Israeli-Serbian pianist who was abducted by Hamas during the Nova Music Festival massacre. He was held hostage in the Gaza Strip for two years, until his release on 13 October 2025 as part of the Gaza peace plan.	Found alive	2 years, 6 days
7 October 2023 See also: Gaza war hostage crisis	Nattapong Pinta	36	Israel	Nattapong Pinta was a Thai agricultural worker who was taken hostage during the 7 October 2023 assault on Kibbutz Nir Oz, near the Gaza Strip, where he worked on an avocado and pomegranate farm. His body was recovered by the Israel Defense Forces (IDF) on 7 June 2025.	Murdered	1 year, 8 months
7 October 2023 See also: Gaza war hostage crisis	Omer Shem Tov	21	Israel	Omer Shem Tov is an Israeli man who was abducted by Hamas on October 7th 2023 during the Nova music festival massacre. He was released on 22 February 2025, as part of the January 2025 Gaza war ceasefire	Found alive	1 year, 5 months, and 15 days
7 October 2023 See also: Gaza war hostage crisis	Vivian Silver	74	Israel	Vivian Silver was a Canadian-Israeli peace activist and women's rights activist. She was murdered in the Be'eri massacre, a part of the October 7 attacks. Her body was identified using DNA on 13 November 2023.	Burned to death	1 month, 6 days
7 October 2023 See also: Gaza war hostage crisis	Edan Alexander	19	Israel	Edan Alexander is an American-Israeli soldier and was taken as a prisoner of war by Hamas on 7 October 2023. He was released on 12 May 2025, following high-profile negotiations involving the U.S. government.	Found alive	1 year, 8 months, and 6 days
7 October 2023 See also: Gaza war hostage crisis	Matan Angrest	20	Israel	Matan Angrest is an Israeli soldier and was taken as a prisoner of war by Hamas on 7 October 2023. He was released on 13 October 2025.	Found alive	2 years, 6 days
7 October 2023 See also: Gaza war hostage crisis	Agam Berger	19	Israel	Agam Berger is an Israeli soldier and was taken as a prisoner of war by Hamas on 7 October 2023. She was released on 30 January 2025.	Found alive	1 year, 3 months, and 23 days
7 October 2023 See also: Gaza war hostage crisis	Elkana Bohbot	34	Israel	Elkana Bohbot is an Israeli man who was abducted by Hamas on 7 October 2023 at the Nova music festival. He was released on 13 October 2025.	Found alive	2 years, 6 days
7 October 2023 See also: Gaza war hostage crisis	Nimrod Cohen	19	Israel	Nimrod Cohen is an Israeli soldier and was taken as a prisoner of war by Hamas on 7 October 2023. He was released on 13 October 2025.	Found alive	2 years, 6 days
7 October 2023 See also: Gaza war hostage crisis	Ariel Cunio	25	Israel	Ariel and David Cunio are Israeli brothers who was abducted to the Gaza Strip, on 7 October 2023 during the massacre at Kibbutz Nir Oz and were released on 13 October 2025, as part of an Israel-Hamas agreement.	Found alive	2 years, 6 days
7 October 2023 See also: Gaza war hostage crisis	David Cunio	33	Israel	Ariel and David Cunio are Israeli brothers who was abducted to the Gaza Strip, on 7 October 2023 during the massacre at Kibbutz Nir Oz and were released on 13 October 2025, as part of an Israel-Hamas agreement.	Found alive	2 years, 6 days
7 October 2023 See also: Gaza war hostage crisis	Emily Damari	27	Israel	Emily Damari is a British-Israeli abducted during the Kfar Aza attacks on 7 October 2023. She was released on 19 January 2025.	Found alive	1 year, 3 months, and 12 days
7 October 2023 See also: Gaza war hostage crisis	Evyatar David	19	Israel	Evyatar David is an Israeli man who was kidnapped during the Nova music festival massacre of the October 7 attacks, and was held as a hostage by Hamas until 13 October 2025, when he was released as part of a hostage-prisoner exchange.	Found alive	2 years, 6 days
7 October 2023 See also: Gaza war hostage crisis	Eitan Mor	23	Israel	Eitan Mor is an Israeli man who was kidnapped during the Nova music festival massacre of the October 7 attacks, and was held as a hostage by Hamas until 13 October 2025, when he was released as part of a hostage-prisoner exchange.	Found alive	2 years, 6 days
7 October 2023 See also: Gaza war hostage crisis	Shoshan Haran	65	Israel	Shoshan Haran is an Israeli woman was kidnapped from her house during the Be'eri massacre and was released 50 days later on 15 November 2023, in the first hostage deal.	Found alive	50 days
7 October 2023 See also: Gaza war hostage crisis	Avigail Idan	3	Israel	Avigail Idan is an American-Israeli child who was abducted in 2023 during the October 7 attacks as part of the Kfar Aza Massacre by Hamas. She was released on 26 November 2023, after spending 50 days in captivity.	Found alive	50 days
7 October 2023 See also: Gaza war hostage crisis	Bar Kupershtein	21	Israel	Bar Kupershtein is an Israeli who was abducted by Hamas on October 7th 2023 while working as a paramedic and security guard at the Nova music festival. He was released on 13 October 2025.	Found alive	2 years, 6 days
7 October 2023 See also: Gaza war hostage crisis	Yosef Ohana	23	Israel	Yosef Ohana is an Israeli who was abducted by Hamas on 7 October 2023, while working as a bartender at the Nova music festival after helping evacuate wounded victims. He was held for 738 days before being released on 13 October 2025.	Found alive	2 years, 6 days
7 October 2023 See also: Gaza war hostage crisis	Noa Marciano	19	Israel	Noa Marciano was a 19-year-old Israeli soldier who was taken as a prisoner of war by Hamas on 7 October 2023 from an IDF observation base on Nahal Oz. Her body was recovered by the IDF on 16 November 2023.	Died (Cause disputed)	1 month, 9 days
7 October 2023 See also: Gaza war hostage crisis	Gadi Moses	79	Israel	Gadi Moses is an Israeli citizen who was abducted from his home by Palestinian Islamic Jihad (PIJ) militants during the Nir Oz massacre on 7 October 2023. He was released on 30 January 2025, as part of an agreement between Israel and Hamas. Moses is the oldest living male hostage released during the Gaza War.	Found alive	1 year, 3 months, and 23 days
7 October 2023 See also: Gaza war hostage crisis	Ran Gvili	24	Israel	Ran Gvili was an Israeli combatant killed in battle near Kibbutz Alumim during the 7 October attacks. His body was taken to the Gaza Strip by Hamas militants during the Hamas-led assault. The IDF reported on 26 January 2026, that Gvili's remains had been located and identified.	Died (KIA)	2 years, 3 months, and 19 days
7 October 2023 See also: Gaza war hostage crisis	Yarden Roman-Gat	36	Israel	Yarden Roman-Gat is a German-Israeli woman who was abducted from her in Kibbutz Be'eri on 7 October 2023, during the Be'eri massacre. Yarden was released on 29 November 2023, as part of a temporary ceasefire and prisoner exchange between Hamas and Israel brokered by Qatar and the United States.	Found alive	53 days
7 October 2023 See also: Gaza war hostage crisis	Mia Schem	21	Israel	Mia Schem, a French-Israeli woman, was abducted by Hamas during the Re'im music festival massacre, part of the October 7 attacks. She appeared in the first hostage video released by Hamas. She was released on 30 November 2023.	Found alive	54 days
7 October 2023 See also: Gaza war hostage crisis	Eli Sharabi	51	Israel	Eli Sharabi is an Israeli man who was abducted during the Be'eri massacre as part of the 7 October 2023 attack. He was released on 8 February 2025. During the massacre, his wife Lian and their daughters Noya and Yahel were murdered. His brother Yossi was also kidnapped and later murdered after 100 days in captivity.	Found alive	1 year, 5 months, and 1 day
7 October 2023 See also: Gaza war hostage crisis	Amit Soussana	40	Israel	Amit Soussana is an Israeli woman who was abducted during the October 7 attacks in the Kfar Aza Massacre. She was freed on 30 November 2023, during the prisoner exchange between Hamas and Israel, after spending 55 days in captivity. She was the first Israeli hostage to come forward about being sexually assaulted in captivity.	Found alive	55 days
4 November 2023	Ross McDonnell	44	United States	Ross McDonnell was a filmmaker and photographer. He was last seen riding a bicycle after he left his apartment in Bedford–Stuyvesant, Brooklyn on 4 November 2023. The bicycle was later found locked up at Fort Tilden Beach in Breezy Point, Queens. On 17 November 2023, a headless and armless body was found in Breezy Point. It was later confirmed that it was McDonnell. Foul play is not suspected.	Drowned	At least 13 days
11 November 2023	Giulia Cecchettin	22	Italy	An Italian college student murdered by her former boyfriend, Filippo Turetta, on 11 November 2023. Her body was discovered in the ski resort of Piancavallo on November 18.	Murdered	1 week
5 December 2023	Alexei Navalny	47	Russia	A Russian opposition leader, lawyer, and political prisoner who has organised anti-government demonstrations and campaigned against corruption in Russia. Navalny briefly disappeared on 5 December 2023; he was later discovered to be incarcerated in the Yamalo-Nenets Autonomous Okrug.	Found alive	3 weeks
8 December 2023	Gaynor Lord	55	United Kingdom	A mother of three who disappeared after leaving her workplace early in Norwich city centre on 8 December 2023. Her belongings were found in Wensum Park, and her body was recovered from the River Wensum on 15 December 2023. The coroner ruled her death as misadventure due to drowning.	Drowned	1 week
16 December 2023	Fredrick Wangabo Mwenengabo	48-49	Democratic Republic of the Congo	Wangabo Mwenengabo is a Congolese-Canadian anthropologist and human rights activist who was kidnapped while visiting family members in Goma, and was held for ransom until being released. He returned to Canada on 1 June 2024.	Found alive	3 months

== 2024 ==
Date	Person(s)	Age	Country of disappearance	Circumstances	Outcome	Time spent missing or unconfirmed
28 January 2024	Hinako Ashihara	50	Japan	Ashihara, a mangaka, was reported missing on January 28. Two days before she went missing, she criticized Nippon TV on her blog for mishandling the live action adaptation of her manga, Sexy Tanaka-san, before deleting the blog post and apologizing. Her body was found in Nikko, Tochigi a day later on January 29. She is believed to have died by suicide.	Died (Suicide)	1 day
29 January 2024	Hind Rajab	5	Palestine	On 29 January 2024, during the Gaza war, Palestinian child Hind Rajab, along with six of her family members, was fleeing from the Gaza City neighborhood of Tel al-Hawa, when an Israeli army tank shot their vehicle, a black Kia, killing Rajab's aunt, uncle, and three cousins. Rajab and another cousin survived and contacted the Palestine Red Crescent Society (PRCS) to ask for help while noting that they were being attacked by an Israeli tank. The cousin was later also killed and Rajab was left stranded in the vehicle for hours on the phone, as paramedics from PRCS attempted to rescue her. Both Rajab and the paramedics were later also found killed on 10 February after an Israeli withdrawal.	Murdered	12 Days
15 February 2024	Audrii Cunningham	11	United States	Cunningham was an 11-year-old girl who went missing from Livingston, Texas, on 15 February 2024, and was found dead five days later. Family Friend Don McDougal pled guilty to her murder and was sentenced to life without parole.	Murdered	5 days
8 February 2024	Alexandra Föderl-Schmid	53	Austria	The Austrian journalist and deputy editor-in-chief of German newspaper Süddeutsche Zeitung disappeared on 8 February. One day later, she was found alive and hypothermic under a bridge over the Inn river in Braunau am Inn.	Found alive	1 day
18 February 2024	Jesse Baird	26	Australia	Baird, a television presenter and Australian rules football goal umpire, was last seen with his partner Luke Davies, aged 29, on the evening of 18 February 2024. On 21 February, personal belongings of both men were found in a skip bin in Cronulla, and a subsequent police search of Baird's Paddington home found large quantities of blood and bullet casings from a police firearm. On February 23, police officer Beau Lamarre-Condon was charged with murder, and on February 27, the bodies of Baird and Davies were found in Bungonia, near Goulburn.	Murdered	9 days
26 March 2024	Danka Ilić	1	Republic of Serbia	Ilić, a 22-month-old Serbian girl, disappeared on 26 March 2024. Ten days after her disappearance, two suspects were arrested for her alleged murder. Her body was never found.	Murdered	Never found
2 April 2024	Sade Robinson	19	United States	Robinson was a college student who went missing in Wisconsin. Her severed leg washed up on Lake Michigan the next day. The other body parts were discovered later.	Murdered	1 day
12 April 2024	Benjamin Achimeir	14	Israel	Benjamin Achimeir, a teenage boy, went missing on 12 April 2024, after he left a farm located close to an Israeli settlement in the West Bank and was found dead a day later.	Murdered	1 day
24 May 2024	Celeste Rivas Hernandez	14	United States	A 14-year-old girl from Lake Elsinore, California was last heard from on 24 May 2024. On 8 September 2025, her body was found decomposed in the trunk of a Tesla belonging to American singer-songwriter David Burke, known professionally as D4vd.	Murdered	1 year, 4 months
5 June 2024	Michael Mosley	67	Greece	British television journalist, producer and presenter reported missing by his wife while they were on holiday with their children on the Greek island of Symi on 5 June 2024. Mosley's wife alerted authorities after he did not return to their hotel. A search-and-rescue team including local people, local police, fire crews, and police from Athens used drones, and extensively searched the tracks and paths he might have taken on foot, with the search extending the following day. On 9 June 2024, Mosley's body was found near a fence on Agia Marina beach in Symi.	Died (Natural causes)	4 days
10 June 2024	Saulos Chilima	51	Malawi	Saulos Chilima, the Malawian Vice President and economist, and Patricia Shanil Muluzi, a teacher, Malawian politician and First Lady of Malawi from 1999 until 2004 who disappeared on 10 June 2024, while aboard an aircraft disappeared from radar in Chikangawa Forest Reserve in Nkhata Bay. The plane and their bodies were found a day later after it had crashed.	Died (plane crash)	1 day
10 June 2024	Patricia Shanil Muluzi	59	Malawi	Saulos Chilima, the Malawian Vice President and economist, and Patricia Shanil Muluzi, a teacher, Malawian politician and First Lady of Malawi from 1999 until 2004 who disappeared on 10 June 2024, while aboard an aircraft disappeared from radar in Chikangawa Forest Reserve in Nkhata Bay. The plane and their bodies were found a day later after it had crashed.	Died (plane crash)	1 day
1 July 2024	Jacques Freitag	42	South Africa	South African high jumper Jacques Freitag went missing on 1 July 2024, from Pretoria West, and was found dead two weeks after being killed.	Murdered	2 weeks
16 June 2024	Bryson Muir	14	United States	The son of NFL player Daniel Muir. Muir was last seen outside his grandmother's home in Cleveland, Ohio on June 16; he was found alive on July 3. Following his discovery, his father was arrested and charged with domestic battery and obstruction of justice.	Found alive	17 days
17 June 2024	Jay Slater	19	Tenerife	Slater was a 19-year-old apprentice bricklayer from England who flew to Tenerife on holiday. On 17 June, after he attended the NRG Festival near his accommodation in Los Cristianos, he travelled some 11 hours northwestward to the mountain village of Masca with two men. He was last heard from at 08:50 WEST, after informing his friend that he would attempt to walk back to his accommodation and was reported missing at 09:04 WEST. 28 days later, his body was found after local authorities identified that he likely died from an accidental fall.	Accidental death	28 days
19 August 2024	Mike Lynch	59	Italy	Mike Lynch disappeared on 19 August 2024, after the super yacht he was travelling in sank off the coast of Sicily, with Lynch and 21 others on board. The yacht was struck by a waterspout and subsequently capsized and sank. His body was found a day later on August 20.	Drowned	1 day
4 October 2024	Sandra Domínguez	36	Mexico	A human right activists for indigenous women in Oaxaca, Sandra Domínguez went missing along with her husband Alexander Hernández. On 24 April 2025, the bodies of Domínguez and Hernández were found in hidden graves at a property located on a dirt road between La Ceiba and Unión Progreso in Santiago Sochiapan, Veracruz.	Murdered	202 days
October 2024	Humaira Asghar	31	Pakistan	Humaira Asghar, a Pakistani actress disappeared In October 2024. She was found deceased on 8 July 2025. Due to her advanced stage of decomposition, a cause of death could not be determined.	Died (unknown cause)	9 months
8 November 2024	Hannah Kobayashi	30	United States	Hannah Kobayashi disappeared on 8 November 2024 after leaving Los Angeles International Airport. She was found unharmed in Tijuana, Mexico and returned to the United States on 16 December 2024.	Found alive	38 days
21 November 2024	Zvi Kogan	28	United Arab Emirates	An Israeli-Moldovan rabbi residing in the United Arab Emirates. Kogan was an envoy of the Orthodox Jewish Hasidic organization Chabad. He was last seen at the kosher supermarket he managed in Dubai. Shortly thereafter, Kogan was abducted and killed. On 24 November 2024, a body was found and confirmed to be that of Kogan.	Murdered	3 days
27 December 2024	Hussam Abu Safiya	51	Palestine	Palestinian paediatrician and neonatologist who served as the director of Kamal Adwan Hospital in the Gaza Strip from February 2024 until its evacuation in December 2024. Abu Safiya was subsequently arrested and has been detained without charge in Ofer Prison for over a year. Israeli forces initially denied his arrest, but later confirmed his detention on 3 January 2025. Amnesty International reported in July 2026 that he remained in jail with his health in critical condition.	Found alive	8 days

== 2025 ==
Date	Person(s)	Age	Country of disappearance	Circumstances	Outcome	Time spent missing or unconfirmed
3 January 2025	Wang Xing	31	Thailand	Wang, a Chinese actor, went missing after travelling to Bangkok after being offered an acting role. He was discovered 4 days later, having been kidnapped by a scam center and brought to Myanmar.	Found alive	4 days
7 January 2025	Eliza Huszti	32	United Kingdom	Eliza and Henrietta Huszti were two sisters from a set of triplets who went missing from Aberdeen in the north east of Scotland on 7 January 2025 and were both found dead on 31 January after their bodies were found in the River Dee.	Drowned	3 weeks
7 January 2025	Henrietta Huszti	32	United Kingdom	Eliza and Henrietta Huszti were two sisters from a set of triplets who went missing from Aberdeen in the north east of Scotland on 7 January 2025 and were both found dead on 31 January after their bodies were found in the River Dee.	Drowned	3 weeks
January 2025	Mizuki Itagaki	24	Japan	Mizuki Itagaki, a 24-year-old male Japanese actor, was reported missing in late January 2025. He was later found dead in Tokyo approximately mid-March 2025.	Died (Suicide)	2 months
February 2025	Sam Nordquist	24	United States	Sam Nordquist, an American man from Red Wing, Minnesota, was officially reported missing in February 2025 after losing contact with family in early January. Sam had flown to New York from Minnesota in September 2024 to meet his girlfriend. His remains were found on 13 February 2025. Authorities stated that he died in early February following over a month of torture and abuse. Seven people have been charged with his murder.	Murdered	Over a month
April 2025	Sam Ruddock	36	United States	Sam Ruddock, a Paralympic athlete disappeared in April 2025 in Las Vegas, Nevada, after going to see WrestleMania 41, has been found safe.	Found alive	12 days
15 May 2025	Pheobe Bishop	17	Australia	Pheobe Bishop, a 17-year-old Australian, was reported missing after she failed to board a flight. Her remains were found on 6 June and identified on 17 June.	Murdered	33 days
30 May 2025	Paityn Decker	9	United States	Sisters Paityn, Evelyn and Olivia Decker (aged ages 9, 8 and 5, respectively) were reported missing in Wenatchee, Washington and were later found murdered. The children's father Travis Caleb Decker, is thought by police to be the perpetrator. Police later found Decker deceased during a search south of Wenatchee.	Murdered	3 days
30 May 2025	Evelyn Decker	8	United States	Sisters Paityn, Evelyn and Olivia Decker (aged ages 9, 8 and 5, respectively) were reported missing in Wenatchee, Washington and were later found murdered. The children's father Travis Caleb Decker, is thought by police to be the perpetrator. Police later found Decker deceased during a search south of Wenatchee.	Murdered	3 days
30 May 2025	Olivia Decker	5	United States	Sisters Paityn, Evelyn and Olivia Decker (aged ages 9, 8 and 5, respectively) were reported missing in Wenatchee, Washington and were later found murdered. The children's father Travis Caleb Decker, is thought by police to be the perpetrator. Police later found Decker deceased during a search south of Wenatchee.	Murdered	3 days
21 June 2025	Juliana Marins	26	Indonesia	Juliana Marins, a Brazilian solo traveler, went missing on 21 June 2025 during a hike on Mount Rinjani, a volcano on the island of Lombok, Indonesia. Her body was retrieved on 24 June 2025.	Accidental death	4 days
12 July 2025	Nicolly Pogere	15	Brazil	Nicolly Pogere, a 15-year-old teenage girl from Mococa, Brazil, was reported missing on 12 July 2025 by her grandfather after failing to return home from a brief stay at her ex-boyfriend's house. Her torso and head wrapped in two blankets and a blue canvas were recovered on 18 July by a police search dog in a lake in Hortolândia. On 24 July, bags containing Pogere's arms and legs were found near the same lake by a municipal cleaning crew mowing grass nearby. On 20 July, Nicolly's 17-year-old ex-boyfriend and his 14-year-old girlfriend were arrested for the brutal killing in Cornélio Procópio, located in the state of Paraná while hiding in the 17-year-old's grandmother's house. The two were sentenced to three years of preventive detention, the harshest punishment applicable to minors in Brazil.	Murdered	6 days
22 August 2025	Joseph Budna	45	Belize	Joseph Budna, a social media personality, was reported missing from Orange Walk, Orange Walk, and found the next day in Melchor, Peten, Guatemala. He alleged (and press leaks suggested) that he had been kidnapped by Belizean police and unlawfully smuggled out of the country.	Found alive	1 day
2 November 2025	Yifat Tomer-Yerushalmi	51	Israel	Yifat Tomer-Yerushalmi is a major general in the Israel Defense Forces who served as the chief military advocate from 1 September 2021 to 31 October 2025. On 31 October 2025, Tomer-Yerushalmi resigned from her post after admitting she was responsible for leaking a classified surveillance video to the media. On November 2, the IDF stated that Tomer-Yerushalmi had gone missing. She was found alive at a beach in Herzliya after several hours, with police, military, and rescue forces participating in her search. She was arrested by police later that night, along with former IDF prosecutor Matan Solomesh.	Found alive	2 hours

== 2026 ==
Date	Person(s)	Age	Country of disappearance	Circumstances	Outcome	Time spent missing or unconfirmed
6 January 2026	Hailey Buzbee	17	United States	Hailey Buzbee was reported missing by her family. Buzbee was believed to have run away from her home. They believe she left her home on January 5, 2026, around 10:00 p.m. Her remains were recovered February 1, 2026 in Perry County, Ohio.Her family spreads awareness and pushes for Hailey's Law. A man was indicted on charges related to her disappearance in September 2026.	Murdered	28 days
14 February 2026	Sisay Luangmonda	31	Laos	A noted critic of the Laotian government, Sisay was last seen on the evening of 14 February 2026 being arrested by Laotian soldiers. His body was found on the side of the road on 20 February, alongside a motorbike and a bag of alcohol. Laotian authorities have denied having any role in his disappearance and death.	Murdered	6 days
23 March 2026	Yuki Adachi	11	Japan	Yuki Adachi was a student of the Sonobe Elementary School. He was last seen on 23 March 2026. His body was found on April 13. His adoptive father confessed to killing the victim.	Murdered	3 weeks
6 June 2026	Linda Perhacs	82	United States	Perhacs is an American psychedelic folk musician who was reported missing by her former manager Laurel Stearns on 6 June 2026. She had been discharged from a care facility by a legal guardian eight months prior. Perhacs was found safe on 29 July 2026.	Found alive	1 month, 23 days
4 July 2026	Nolan Wells	18	United States	On 6 July 2026, the body of Nolan Wells, an 18-year-old student and wide receiver at Southwest Mississippi Community College, was found by a National Park Service agent along the shoreline of Horn Island, a barrier island off the Mississippi Gulf Coast. He was initially reported missing two days prior on July 4, when he did not return home after an Independence Day gathering on the island.	Died (under investigation)	2 days
16 July 2026	Parker Wells	11	Canada	Wells was a nonverbal autistic boy from Calgary, Alberta, who was reported missing after eloping from a specialized day care provider. On 29 July 2026, his remains were found in a drainage pipe on Deerfoot Trail.	Accidental death	13 days

== See also ==
- List of solved missing person cases (post-2000)
