= 2023 Jani Khel attack =

- Part of Insurgency in Khyber Pakhtunkhwa
- Location: Jani Khel, Bannu District, Khyber Pakhtunkhwa, Pakistan
- Date: August 31, 2023
- Target: Pakistani Armed Forces
- Deaths: 9
- Injuries: 20+
- Perpetrator: Tehreek-e-Taliban

On August 31, 2023, unknown militants attacked a military convoy in Jani Khel, Bannu District, Khyber Pakhtunkhwa, Pakistan, killing nine soldiers and wounding 20 others.

== Background ==
The Islamic State – Khorasan Province (ISKP) and Tehreek-e-Taliban (TTP) have waged an insurgency for years in northern Pakistan, targeting Pakistani soldiers and civilians. A week prior to the Jani Khel attack, ISKP killed 11 people in North Waziristan.

== Attack ==
The attack began when a man riding a motorcycle trailed behind a military convoy passing through Jani Khel. The motorcyclist, who was carrying a suicide bomb, rammed himself into the convoy and blew himself up. Nine soldiers were killed, and five others were injured in the bombing according to the Pakistani government. However, Pakistani security sources reported the number of injuries as above 20. One of the soldiers was named Naib Subedar Sanobar Ali.

Pakistani Prime Minister Anwaar ul Haq Kakar expressed his condolences for the martyred soldiers in a statement on Twitter. Tehreek-i-Taliban claimed responsibility for the attack.
