= Janikhel protest =

Killing of four teenage boys in Janikhel, Bannu

Janikhel incident
- Date: 21 March 2021 (corpses found)
- Location: Seentanga, Janikhel, Bannu District, Khyber Pakhtunkhwa, Pakistan
- Deaths: 4 (Ahmadullah, Atifullah, Mohammad Rahim, and Razamullah or Nizamullah)
- Suspects: Unknown

On 21 March 2021, a mass grave containing the mutilated corpses of four teenage boys was found by a shepherd's dog in the Janikhel area of Bannu District, Khyber Pakhtunkhwa, Pakistan. As the locals, including the victims' relatives, dug up the bodies, one was found to have been beheaded, one had been shot, and the other two had been stoned to death. The victims were identified; they were between 13 and 17 years and were fond of hunting birds and wild hares in the area. The boys had gone hunting three weeks before and had since disappeared.

Soon after discovering the bodies, a protest sit-in started in Janikhel. On 28 March, about 10,000 protesters embarked on a long march from Janikhel to Peshawar and Islamabad with the dead bodies to demand action against militants. The local police erected hurdles on the road and used teargas and aerial firing to stop the protesters for several hours. Manzoor Pashteen and Mohsin Dawar, leaders of the Pashtun Tahafuz Movement (PTM), were taken into custody by the police in Kohat and Karak, respectively, to prevent them from travelling to Bannu to join and lead the long march. On 29 March, as the protesters had reached Dami Pul in Domel, Bannu, the 8-day protest was postponed after an agreement was signed with them by Mahmood Khan, the Chief Minister of Khyber Pakhtunkhwa.

On 31 May, Malik Naseeb Khan, one of the tribal chiefs of Janikhel, was assassinated by militants, which sparked another wave of protest. The protesters refused to bury the slain chieftain, and vowed that they would continue the protest until the killers were punished. On 23 June, a protester named Wahid Khan was shot dead and several others were injured as the police blocked the protesters from marching towards Islamabad. On 27 June, the tribesmen ended the 27-day protest after the authorities released four missing men from Janikhel who had been victims of enforced disappearance.

== Background ==
According to local journalists, the four boys had also been kidnapped during the previous year by Tehrik-i-Taliban Pakistan (TTP) when they went hunting in a similar way. They were freed after a video of them was released.

== Protest ==
The locals refused to bury the dead bodies and started a protest sit-in outside a military fort in Janikhel. For a stronger protest, they decided to march along with the bodies to Islamabad on 28 March 2021. The Khyber Pakhtunkhwa Police erected hurdles on the road and used teargas and aerial firing against the protestors in an attempt to prevent them from crossing on the way, but the protesters nevertheless succeeded to cross the hurdles. On 29 March, as the protesters had reached Dami Pul in Domel, the long march was postponed after successful negotiations with Mahmood Khan, the Chief Minister of Khyber Pakhtunkhwa.

=== Demands ===
The main demands were:

- A government guarantee that the Taliban and other militants would not be permitted to operate in the area
- Lodging of an FIR against the security official in whose jurisdiction the murders took place

=== Agreement by the government ===
The long march to Islamabad was postponed when the government successfully signed an agreement with the protesters, after which Manzoor Pashteen and Mohsin Dawar, who were arrested on 28 March, were released, and the protesters carried the four dead bodies back to Janikhel for burial. The agreement stated:

- The government will conduct a transparent investigation into the incident and prosecute those responsible
- The government will ensure peace by removing armed groups from the area
- The locals will be permitted possession of weapons with a license, and their houses will not be demolished
- Within three months, the government will conduct a review of the individuals from Janikhel who are in government custody, and those who are found innocent will be released while those found guilty will be presented before courts
- The government approved a package of Rs2.5 million each for the victims' families

== Families of the victims ==
The fathers of three of the victims worked as laborers, while the father of the fourth boy had died.

The mother of Nizamullah, one of the victim boys, said: "I loved my son. I worked as a laborer, and even harvested the crops myself to raise him and run the house, but he left me at such a young age." Describing the condition of her house, she said that it was actually a room, not a four-walled house, and that she had built it herself working as a laborer. She lamented that besides her daughters, she had only one son left now while her husband was disabled.

She said: "I used to keep 10 or 20 rupees in my pocket for Nizamullah. When he would come at night, there would be little food, so I would tell him to drink more water so that his stomach was full." Before his leaving, he informed her that he was going hunting. She said that when he did not return and it became dark, "I went to the neighborhood and met the mother of Atifullah, who had gone hunting with Nizamullah. She said that the dogs that had gone with the boys have returned but the boys have not." Both women then started searching for their sons.

Nizamullah's mother added: "I asked for a motorcycle from someone and put petrol into it. I sat on the motorcycle with a relative and kept looking for my son. People would mock me and say look, a woman is sitting on a motorcycle, but I would say I was looking for my son and that I do not care what people say."

The father of 13-year-old Atifullah, Zarwali Khan, who worked in Saudi Arabia, said that he came back after finding out about his son's murder. "When I returned home four years after working hard in Saudi Arabia, I found my son's corpse. Four days have passed and he has not been buried so that at least his soul could get justice. Atif was my youngest son." He added that his only other son had been in the custody of state agencies for the previous five months and he had not been able to see him since returning from Saudi Arabia.

Ahmadullah's uncle, Subhan Wali, said that the protest would continue until the demands were met. He added: "The government should identify the killers, arrest and punish them, and ask those responsible for security, because there are checkpoints near where the bodies were found. Now this game of blood must stop."

== See also ==
- List of fugitives from justice who disappeared
- List of solved missing person cases (2020s)
- List of unsolved murders (2000–present)
- Pashtun National Jirga
