= Irion =

Irion is a surname. Notable people with the surname include:

- Alfred Briggs Irion (1833–1903), U.S. Representative from Louisiana
- Johnny Irion (born 1969) and Sarah Lee Guthrie (born 1979), United States musical duo
- Robert Anderson Irion (1804–1861), physician, surveyor and Secretary of State of Texas
- Naomi Irion (2003–2022), American murder victim

== See also ==
- Irion County, Texas, county located in the U.S. state of Texas
