= Death of Émile Soleil =

2023 child death in France

Émile Soleil
- Soleil before his death
- Born: 11 November 2020
- Disappeared: 8 July 2023, Haut-Vernet
- Body discovered: 30 March 2024, Haut-Vernet, France
- Known for: Suspected murder victim
- Parents: Colomban Soleil (father); Marie Soleil (mother)
- Family: Alaïs Soleil (sister)

On 8 July 2023, two-year-old Émile Soleil went missing in the French hamlet of Haut-Vernet. His remains were found on 30 March 2024.

== Victim ==
Émile was born on 11 November 2020. Soleil was the eldest son of Marie and Colomban Soleil. The family resided in La Bouilladisse, a small town located 30 km from Marseille. Soleil, who had blonde hair and brown eyes, was 2 1/2 years old at the time of his disappearance.

== Disappearance ==
On the morning of 8 July 2023, Marie Soleil brought Émile to his maternal grandparents Philippe and Anne Vedovini, who were spending their summer vacation in a house in the hamlet of Haut-Vernet, in the commune of Vernet at the foot of the Massif des Trois-Évêchés.

That day, the grandparents were at home with eight of their ten children, aged 7 to 18 years old. Émile's mother Marie left after dropping off her son. In the morning, Émile's young uncles and aunts were busy building a cabin near the house.

Around 5 p.m., Émile played in the garden while waiting to be taken for a walk. The grandfather loaded stakes and electric wire into the trunk of his car to fence a meadow intended for his horses. At the same time, Émile left the house and walked down the street. He was wearing a yellow T-shirt and white shorts. It was thought he wanted to return to the cabin his uncles were building that morning.

According to the formal statements of two witnesses, the boy was last seen around 5:15 p.m. approximately 20 m (66 ft) from the family home.

At 6:12 p.m., after searching for Émile for around 45 minutes, the grandparents reported his disappearance to the Alpes-de-Haute-Provence gendarmerie, who immediately began a search.

== Initial search ==
=== Saturday, 8 July ===
Under the authority of the fire brigade, about a hundred people from the town and neighbouring villages mobilized. A helicopter flew over the area and three gendarmerie dogs scoured the area. The investigation lasted from 6:40 p.m. to 3 a.m. and combed 12 hectares (30 acres) of land in the immediate vicinity of the disappearance site. Having produced no results, the investigation then focused on the hamlet where Émile was last seen.

=== Sunday, 9 July ===
The day after the disappearance, Rémy Avon, public prosecutor of Digne-les-Bains, launched an appeal for witnesses. The appeal generated more than 1,400 reports, most of which led to nothing. Not all the legal criteria were met to initiate a kidnapping alert procedure.

An investigation into flagrance (immediate investigation of a possible crime in progress) was opened "to look for the causes of disturbing disappearance". The grandparents were questioned. The search resumed with the support of 200 volunteers. The gendarmerie used drones and helicopters equipped with thermal cameras. Search and rescue dogs of the Alpes-de-Haute-Provence Departmental Fire and Rescue Service (SDIS) were mobilised. In particular, they employed bloodhounds, which have a strong sense of smell. According to the General of Gendarmerie Jacques-Charles Fombonne, "the dogs spotted his track in two places, within a radius of 20 m (66 ft) around the house, then nothing, which may mean that at that moment the child got into a vehicle."

In the evening, during a press conference, the prefect and the public prosecutor confirmed that two witnesses had seen the child in a steep street in the village, but they didn't worry about it because it is common to see children playing alone in the small hamlet. The prosecutor clarified that no hypothesis was privileged or ruled out: "We don't have any clue to this, we are on the search operations which are the vital priority for this child."

=== Monday, 10 July ===
On Monday, the search resumed with the help of 500 volunteers. In the evening, during a press conference, the prefect of the Alpes-de-Haute-Provence Marc Chappuis said that for two days, nearly 800 volunteers would help the institutional services within a 5-km (3.1-mile) radius. He thanked the volunteers who had committed themselves in the last few hours but asked them to make way for a more suitable system, assisted by soldiers. He considered that at this stage "the child's life is at stake" due to the circumstances, age, temperatures and topography. According to Rémy Avon, the investigation was "still ongoing, with no progress."

In accordance with procedure, the investigation of flagrance was converted into a preliminary inquiry.

=== Tuesday, 11 July ===
Until 13 July 2023, the gendarmes carried out "sweeping operations," which remained in vain. On the evening of 11 July, the prosecutor Rémy Avon declared that all the 30 buildings making up the hamlet of Haut-Vernet had been searched, 12 vehicles visited, the 25 inhabitants of the town questioned and 12 hectares (30 acres) of land "meticulously combed." A total of 97 hectares (240 acres) had been explored. According to Le Monde, it was "undoubtedly one of the most important judicial sweep operations ever conducted."

Insisting on the fact that "no scenario is more likely, no scenario is excluded," prosecutor Rémy Avon confirmed that the investigation was entering a second phase.

== Remains discovered ==
=== Discovery by a hiker ===
On Saturday, 30 March 2024, a hiker brought a plastic bag containing bones she discovered below the hamlet of Haut-Vernet to the gendarmerie. The bones consisted of a skull and teeth, which the hiker claimed to have found on a narrow forest road, in the vicinity of the place called Les Auches, a wooded and rather steep area 1.7 km (1.1 mi) and a 25-minute walk from the hamlet, which had previously been searched.

The next day, the public prosecutor of Aix-en-Provence announced that investigators from the Forensic Science Department of the French National Gendarmerie had established by genetic identification that these were the bones of Émile, thus confirming his death. Initial analyses of the skull, which was missing the maxilla and a tooth, showed post-mortem cracks, bites, and small fractures, probably of animal origin.

=== Resumption of the search ===
The search was then relaunched near the site of the discovery. On Tuesday, 2 April 2024, the prosecutor announced that clothing (a T-shirt, shoes and underwear) was found 150 m (490 ft) below the place where the skull was discovered, scattered over about ten meters. Soon after, a small bone fragment was found nearby. These discoveries did not allow for determination of whether the body could have been moved, either by a third party or by natural elements, or the cause of death.

== 2025 arrest ==
The police announced that the maternal grandparents, as well as two of their children, were arrested over the toddler's disappearance and death. Two days later they were all released. However, the prosecutor, Mr. Blachon, said that the line of investigation centered around Emile's family members was not yet fully closed. The prosecutor also stated for the first time that his team now believed that the clothes and remains were brought to the woods where they were found, and had only been there for a short time.

Mr Blachon added that analysis of the toddler's skull showed traces of "violent facial trauma" which made it feasible that a third party must have been involved in the disappearance and death of Emile. This made the theory that the boy had wandered off by himself and died as a result of a fall improbable.

== See also ==
- List of solved missing person cases (2020s)
- List of unsolved deaths
