= Murder of Gretchen Anthony =

2020 murder in Florida

- Location: Abacoa, Florida, U.S.
- Date: March 21, 2020; 6 years ago
- Target: Gretchen Crain Anthony
- Attack type: Murder by stabbing
- Deaths: 1
- Victim: Gretchen Crain Anthony
- Perpetrator: David Anthony Deutsch
- Charges: Second-degree murder; Kidnapping
- Sentence: 38 years in prison

Gretchen Stoughton Anthony (January 8, 1969 – March 21, 2020) was an American woman from Jupiter, Florida, who was murdered by her estranged husband, David Ethan Anthony, in the early morning hours of March 21, 2020. David Anthony had attempted to persuade Gretchen Anthony to travel with him to Costa Rica, where he believed they could escape the COVID-19 pandemic. When Gretchen declined, David entered her house in Abacoa, Florida, and stabbed her to death in her garage. He then discarded her body in a nearby wooded area before fleeing the state.

David Anthony was apprehended in Las Cruces, New Mexico, less than a week later; he was charged with second-degree murder and kidnapping. Per the conditions of a plea agreement, David revealed the location of Gretchen's body, and on January 14, 2021, he was sentenced to 38 years in prison.

== Background ==
=== People involved ===
Gretchen Crain was born in Doylestown, Pennsylvania. She grew up in New Jersey, residing in West Long Branch and Wanamassa. She graduated from Shore Regional High School in 1987, and attended Wood Tobé–Coburn School, later earning her bachelor's degree from Monmouth University. She was a teacher for many years, which included working at The Weiss School.

At the time of her murder, Gretchen was 51 years old, resided in Jupiter, Florida, and worked as the human resources manager of a utility company. She had a 12-year-old daughter from a previous relationship.

David Ethan Anthony, originally David Anthony Deutsch, was a fitness trainer. He served a brief stint in jail after holding up a Blockbuster video store with a squirt gun. Gretchen and David met at a gym where David was a trainer. The two were married at a chapel in Las Vegas in March 2015.

Anthony was fired in 2017. His manager allowed him to return in 2020, but was forced to fire him again. Anthony's manager subsequently warned Gretchen to stay away from him, to which Gretchen responded that David was crazy.

=== Events prior to murder ===
Gretchen and David separated in late 2019, and David moved in with his mother in November 2019. Gretchen filed for divorce on February 28, 2020. She later installed security cameras after David returned to her house.

Just over a week prior to Gretchen's murder, the COVID-19 virus was declared a pandemic by the World Health Organization. David, believing the pandemic to be an "end-of-the-world prophecy", unsuccessfully attempted to convince Gretchen to travel with him to Costa Rica, where he believed they could escape the pandemic.

On March 15, 2020, a week before Gretchen's murder, David was reported to have been following teenage girls at a mall. He was charged with resisting arrest with violence after slamming a car door on the arm of a responding officer. David spent a few days in jail before posting $3,000 bail; he was released three days before Gretchen's murder. As part of the terms of his release, David was not allowed to leave the county.

== Murder ==
In the early morning hours of March 21, 2020, David, dressed in dark clothing, entered Gretchen's home in Abacoa, a community in Jupiter, Florida. Surveillance footage captured David lurking on Gretchen's patio. The footage also captured muffled audio from Gretchen, who unsuccessfully attempted to call 911 through Amazon Alexa. A neighbor of Gretchen's later claimed to have heard a woman screaming: "No! No, it hurts!" Additional footage captured David subsequently loading items into Gretchen's car. The footage also captured a water jug smeared with blood, as well as David reaching up to disable a security camera.

== Investigation ==
Gretchen's family became aware of her disappearance after she missed lunch with a friend on March 21 and failed to report to work on March 23.

On March 23, Gretchen's family began to receive text messages, supposedly from Gretchen, that corroborated David's claims, claiming that she would be quarantining for two weeks. According to Gretchen's coworkers, they received an email from her on March 24 containing the same information. Gretchen's vehicle, which contained her purse, was discovered in the parking lot of a medical center in Jupiter. The Jupiter Medical Center informed police and Gretchen's family members that she had not been a patient there since 2008. The vehicle tested positive for blood on the steering wheel and gearshift.

During a search of Gretchen's home, law enforcement discovered signs of a struggle, including a broken picture frame, shards of glass on Gretchen's bed, and a stained towel. They also found bleach stains on the garage floor and bottles of cleaning agents in the kitchen. Following the search, law enforcement contacted David, who claimed that Gretchen had become infected with COVID-19 and was receiving treatment at a Centers for Disease Control and Prevention (CDC) facility in Belle Glade, Florida, despite there not being a CDC facility in that location.

David's mother told police that he had packed up his truck and left for Costa Rica with his dog on March 24. He stopped at jewelry stores to sell Gretchen's jewelry, telling one store owner that it had belonged to someone who died from COVID-19.

Gretchen's cell phone pinged in Pensacola, Florida, shortly after noon on March 25, and later pinged in Texas. David's cell phone pinged in Pecos, Texas, on March 27, and in Las Cruces, New Mexico, the following day.

=== Arrest ===
David Anthony was apprehended in Las Cruces on the evening of March 31, 2020, while walking his husky. David was arrested at a gas station and charged with second-degree murder and kidnapping in connection with Gretchen's disappearance. He was held without bail at a detention center in Las Cruces. Authorities believed that David was planning to relocate to South America. He was extradited to Jupiter on May 14.

David initially insisted that Gretchen was still alive, claiming that she was "on the run" because she discovered illegal activities at the company for which she worked, feared that someone was after her, and was traveling with David to El Paso, Texas, until they separated. However, as part of a plea agreement, David admitted to stabbing Gretchen to death in her garage and discarding her body. On December 21, 2020, Gretchen's remains were discovered approximately three miles from her home, in a grassy area behind a Walmart and near a retirement home. She had been stabbed in her neck and torso.

=== Sentencing ===
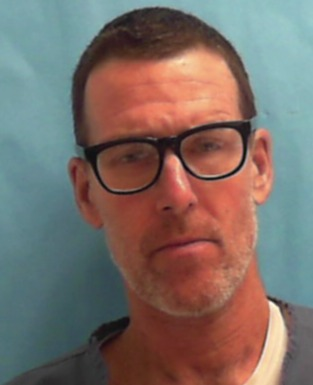
David Anthony prison mug shot

At his sentencing hearing, David Anthony claimed that the COVID-19 pandemic had predisposed him to commit a crime because he thought it was an Armageddon from which he had to escape. According to family members, David had been struggling with bipolar disorder for years.

Per the conditions of his plea agreement, David Anthony was sentenced to 38 years in prison on January 14, 2021. He is scheduled to be released in 2058, when he would be 81 years old.

== See also ==
- List of solved missing person cases (2020s)
