= Murder of Hanifa Abubakar =

2021 murder case of a five-year-old Nigerian girl

Hanifa Abubakar
- Born: Hanifa Abubakar; April 5, 2016; Nassarawa, Kano State, Nigeria
- Died: c. December 18, 2021 (aged 5); Nassarawa, Kano State, Nigeria
- Cause of death: Homicide by Abdulmalik Tanko
- Body discovered: January 20, 2022; Kwanar Dakata, Nassarawa, Kano State, Nigeria
- Citizenship: Nigeria
- Known for: Murder victim

Hanifa Abubakar (April 5, 2016 – c. December 18, 2021) was a five-year-old Nigerian girl who was kidnapped and murdered by Abdumalik Tanko, the proprietor of her school Noble Kids Academy in Nassarawa, Kano State, Nigeria. The case received national attention due to the young age of the victim and the manner of her death.

== Background ==
She was the only daughter of her parents, Mr. and Mrs. Abubakar.

== Disappearance and murder ==
Hanifa Abubakar was kidnapped by Abdulmalik on December 2, 2021, outside the Islamic School she attended at Kwanar Dakata, Nassarawa, Kano state. He took her to his house at Tudun Murtala, Nassarawa Local Government Area in Kano State. He told his wife that she was the daughter of one of his teachers who was traveling. On December 4, 2021, he contacted her families and demanded a ransom ₦6,000,000.00 ($14,600).

On December 18, 2021, Mr. Abdulmalik realized that Hanifa could recognize him. After he finished drinking tea around 23:00hrs, he put the remaining tea in an empty container of Bobo Yoghurt (a yoghurt-based milk drink for the children) and poured rat poison into the tea. He picked Hanifa from his house where she was sleeping, and told her that he was taking her back to her uncle's house. On their way, he gave Hanifa the poisoned drink, and she drank it. He told her that he had to pick up something from one of their schools at Kwanar Yan Gana Tudun Murtala, Nassarawa. When they entered the school, Hanifa died. Abdulmalik put her corpse in a sack and buried her in a shallow grave with the help of one Hashim Isyaku.

== Investigation and discovery ==
Sustained efforts and prolonged follow up by Nigerian Police Force and Department of State Security (DSS) led to arrest of Abdulamalik Tanko, the proprietor of her school Noble Kids Academy in Nassarawa, Kano State. Mr Tanko confessed that he kidnapped Hanifa and killed her after he noticed that she recognized him. He conspired with Hashim Isyaku to bury her in the school premises. Upon the arrest, Abdulmalik and Hashim led the combined team of Department of State Service operatives, police operatives and police command medical team to the grave. The body was exhumed and taken to Mohammed Abdullahi Wase Specialists Hospital, Kano, where it was examined and later released to the relatives for burial.

== Reactions ==
The death of Hanifa attracted media interest around the world with #JusticeForHanifa trending on social media to express their shock and sadness. The Kano State governor Abdullahi Umar Ganduje revoked the operational licenses of all private schools in the state in order to sanitize the operation of private schools to avoid the reoccurrence of similar cases. Despite the government action to shutdown the school indefinitely, 24 January 2022, some unknown angry youths stormed the school premises in the middle of the night and set the school on fire.

== Trial ==
On 24 January 2022, Abdulmalik and the remaining suspects Isyaku Hashim and Fatima Jibril were arranged to magistrate court in Kano. They were both accused of criminal conspiracy, kidnapping, concealing/keeping in confinement a kidnapped person and culpable homicide.

On 28 July 2022, a Kano State High Court sentenced Abdulmalik and Hashim to death, while Jibril was sentenced to two years imprisonment.

== See also ==
- List of solved missing person cases (2020s)
