= Hans-Joachim Lohre =

German Roman Catholic priest and missionary

- Church: Catholic Church

Personal details
- Occupation: Priest, missionary

Hans-Joachim “Ha-Jo” Lohre is a German Roman Catholic priest and missionary.

== Biography ==
Lohre hails from Hövelhof in North Rhine-Westphalia. He became a member of the White Fathers. He travelled to Mali in the early 1990s; he had previously visited the country for the first time in 1981. Lohre taught at the Institute for Christian-Islamic Education and ran a faith and meeting center in Bamako. He is also national secretary of the Commission for Interreligious Dialogue in Mali.

On November 20, 2022, Lohre was kidnapped while celebrating mass by unknown assailants in Bamako, Mali. His car was found abandoned, with a severed Christian cross necklace lying next to it. He was released by his captors and later returned to Germany on November 27, 2023, after a year in captivity.

== See also ==
- List of kidnappings (2020–present)
- List of solved missing person cases (2020s)
