= Ken Kadokura =

Japanese baseball player and coach

Ken Kadokura 門倉健
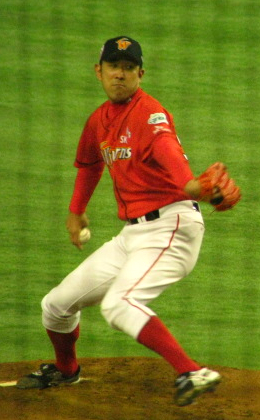
- Starting pitcher/ Pitching Coach
- Born: March 9, 1973 (age 53); Iruma, Saitama, Japan
- Bats: Right Throws: Right

Professional debut
- NPB: July 26, 1996, for the Chunichi Dragons
- KBO: April 18, 2009, for the SK Wyverns

NPB statistics (through 2008)
- Win–loss: 78–82
- Strikeout: 1146
- Earned run average: 4.36

KBO statistics
- Win–loss record: 27–17
- Earned run average: 4.03
- Strikeouts: 303
- Stats at Baseball Reference

Teams
- As player: Chunichi Dragons (1996–1999); Osaka Kintetsu Buffaloes (2000–2003); Yokohama BayStars (2004–2006); Yomiuri Giants (2007–2008); SK Wyverns (2009–2010); Samsung Lions (2011); As coach: Samsung Lions (2013–2015); Chunichi Dragons (2019–2021)

Career highlights and awards
- Korean Series champion (2011)

Ken Kadokura (門倉 健, Kadokura Ken; born March 9, 1973) is a retired Japanese professional baseball pitcher. He played in Nippon Professional Baseball (Chunichi Dragons, Yomiuri Giants) and the KBO League. He threw a four-seam fastball, a slider, and a fork ball.

== Biography ==
After 13 years in NPB, Kadokura made his debut in the Korea Baseball Organization with the SK Wyverns in 2009. He signed with the Samsung Lions in January 2011.

As of 2019, Kadokura will be serving as a pitching coach for the Chunichi Dragons' second team.

On May 15, 2021, he resigned as a coach.

Kadokura had gone missing in 2021, but resurfaced after 22 days.

== See also ==
- List of solved missing person cases (2020s)
