= Death of Danka Ilić =

Serbian child killed by a car

Danka Ilić
- Born: 6 May 2022
- Disappeared: 26 March 2024 (aged 1)

On 26 March 2024, 22-month-old Serb girl Danka Ilić (6 May 2022 – 26 March 2024) disappeared in Banjsko Polje near Bor, Republic of Serbia. On 4 April, ten days after her disappearance, authorities arrested two people in connection with her disappearance, who had supposedly confessed to killing her.^{A} The brother of one of the suspects was also subsequently arrested and died while in police custody, with signs of torture on his corpse. Ilić's body has not yet been found.

Upon her disappearance, Serbia issued the first Amber alert message in the country's history.

== Disappearance ==
On 26 March, Danka and her mother, Ivana, were on a walk in Banjsko Polje. Around 1:45 p.m. local time, Ivana lost track of her daughter.

According to authorities, shortly after Danka had been separated from her mother, at 1:52 p.m. she was hit by a car. She was still alive at that time, however, but one of the two suspects then killed her. The two drivers then supposedly transported her body to a landfill, but then moved the body on 28 March.

== Investigation ==
Initial investigations in Banjsko Polje found no leads. Interpol became involved with the search for Ilić, and issued a yellow warrant in her case by 1 April.

Some investigators suggested Ilić may have been taken out of the country. Viennese police investigated a video recorded in Vienna, Austria, alleged to be of Ilić, but concluded that there was no connection to the case.

=== Arrest and detention of suspects ===
On the morning of 4 April, police found blood on a utility vehicle. They proceeded to arrest two people connected to the car in connection with Ilić's disappearance and death. Two suspects are 50-year olds named Dejan Dragijević and Srđan Janković. The President of Serbia Aleksandar Vučić reported that the two confessed to killing Ilić. The police further reported that the suspects would lead police to where Ilić's body had been left. However, although the suspects were subsequently seen at different places accompanied by police, Ilić's body remained undiscovered.

On 5 April, two suspects were brought to the state attorney in Zaječar. It was reported that Dragijević there confessed to strangling Ilić, as well as having his father and brother helping him to hide the body, while Janković maintained his right to remain silent. Both suspects were ordered to be held for 30 days, and they face charge of aggravated murder, punishable by life imprisonment. On 30 April, High Court in Zaječar extended their detention for another 30 days.

On 4 June, Janković was on his own request interrogated by state attorney in Zaječar, and this time he completely denied committing any crime. Similarly, Dragijević also denied having any crime committed when interrogated in Zaječar on July 11, also on his own request.

=== Arrest of Dragijević's father and brother ===
On 6 April 73-year-old Rade and 40-year-old Dalibor Dragijević, Dragijević's father and brother, were arrested on suspicion of helping Dragijević to dispose of Ilić's body. Both were ordered to be detained for 48 hours.

On 7 April, Rade was brought to state attorney in Zaječar, where he reportedly maintained his right to silence, and was ordered to be detained for 30 days. He was released on 29 May.

==== Death of Dalibor Dragijević ====
On 7 April, the local police reported that Dalibor Dragijević died from natural causes at 3:10 am that day at police station in Bor. However, on 19 April, Serbian media first reported that Dragijević died of violent causes, as revealed by autopsy and contrary to what police said in the aftermath of his death. It was later revealed that he was beaten to death at the police station, with obvious signs of torture on his corpse. On 1 May, after internal control sector made an inspection in connection to Dragijević's death, they recommended disciplinary action and suspension for three policemen.

=== Other developments ===
On 8 May, it was reported that no DNA by Ilić was found on any part of the car that supposedly hit Ilić.

On 15 May, Dragijević's mother died of natural causes.

== See also ==
- List of solved missing person cases (2020s)

== Notes ==
A.The veracity of the initial claim of the suspects' supposed confession has been greatly disputed in the subsequent months, due to lack of other evidence, lack of transparency and strong evidence of police torture.
