= Murder of Luis Espinoza =

Death and subsequent judicial case in Argentina

Killing of Luis Espinoza
- Date: May 15, 2020
- Location: Monteagudo, Tucuman, Argentina
- Type: Homicide
- Cause: Bullet wound Police brutality
- Participants: List: 9 Tucuman Province Policemen; José Morales; Rubén Montenegro; Miriam González; René Ardiles; Víctor Salinas; Carlos Romano; José Paz; Gerardo González Rojas; Claudio Zelaya; 1 municipal security guard; Fabio Santillán
- Outcome: Death of Luis Espinoza on May 15, 2020; Protests, social media criticism on police brutality
- Burial: Monteagudo, Tucuman, Argentina
- Arrests: 10
- Accused: 10
- Charges: Forced disappearance followed by homicide

Luis Armando Espinoza, a 31-year-old Argentinian citizen, died during a police raid in the northern province of Tucumán, Argentina, in the context of the COVID-19 pandemic lockdown in the country.

After his body was found, an investigation (Luis Espinoza case, Caso Luis Espinoza in Spanish) revealed that he was shot to death after being wrongly suspected of engaging in an illegal horse race. Covered in plastic and rug, his body was moved to a police precinct. It was then placed inside a car trunk which traveled to the neighboring province of Catamarca where his body was dropped into a ravine.

The public opinion traced similarities between his murder and the Santiago Maldonado case.

In June 2020, the UN launched an investigation on the crime, through the OHCHR.

== Victim ==
Luis Espinoza was a 31-year-old rural worker, from the town of Melcho, Tucumán and a father of six. He had seventeen brothers.

== Arrest and death ==
On May 15, 2020, while Argentina was under a nationwide quarantine because of the COVID-19 pandemic, Luis Espinoza was found by police on the northern town of Simoca, Tucumán, where an illegal horse race was taking place. The conduct of the said activity was in violation of the quarantine policies. The victim was riding a horse along his brother Juan in the vicinity of the race, when nine police officers and a municipal security guards arrived to stop the illegal event.

At least four police officers had a struggle with Juan and, when his brother Luis tried to defend him, he fell off his horse and ran; being later shot at his back with a police service gun. The bullet entered through his left shoulder blade, piercing his lung.

His body was then moved to the Monteagudo police precinct, where for four hours, it was being readied to be disposed. The corpse was stripped into a flag pole with plastic bags and a rug. He died in some moment between the shooting and the moving to the police precinct.

His body left the precinct inside the car trunk of Rubén Montenegro, deputy commissioner, and he was transported 75 miles to the border of the Catamarca province, where he was dropped into a ravine.

On May 16, 2020, Luis' family tried to file a police report for his disappearance, in the very same precinct where his dead body was taken. The policeman declined the chance to file a report before 72 hours since his disappearance. After several days, the policeman admitted of having a silence pact and later on, informed the location of the body. It was found in La Banderita, Catamarca, on May 22, 2020, inside a 492 feet-deep ravine.

Once the corpse was found, an autopsy and ballistics report established that the bullet causing the deadly wound came from a police service gun, a Jericho 941 (an Israeli tactic .9mm pistol) that belonged to José Morales, one of the accused policemen.

The usage of this weapon by the Tucuman security forces had been under question two years prior to the Luis Espinoza case, since it is not a common weapon for security forces in any other area of Argentina. This resulted in a criminal case for fraudulent administration against the province civil servants, which was dismissed.

== Indictments ==
Several security forces members were accused for Luis Espinoza's crime, under the crimes of forced disappearance followed by death and kidnapping.

- José Morales
- Rubén Montenegro
- Miriam González
- René Ardiles
- Víctor Salinas
- Carlos Romano
- José Paz
- Gerardo González Rojas
- Claudio Zelaya
- Fabio Santillán (municipal security guard)

On May 20, 2020, judge Mario Velázquez order the pre-trial detention for the length of six months for six of the ten accused. The prosecutor had requested a 12-months remand.

== Convictions and sentences ==
The trial, which began on October 24, 2022 and ended on March 28, 2023, resulted in a total of nine convictions. Most of the defendants appealed but in December 2024 the Federal Chamber of Appeals confirmed their convictions and the life sentences of José Alberto Morales and his colleagues, deputy commissioner Héctor Rubén Montenegro, agent Gerardo Esteban González Rojas and corporal Claudio Alfredo Zelaya, for aggravated homicide. In addition, all of them were sentenced as for the “illegitimate deprivation of liberty” of his brother Juan Antonio. The court also upheld the five year sentences of Carlos Lisandro Romano and first corporal José María Paz, for the crime of aggravated concealment.

Corporal Mirian Rosalba González’s conviction and sentence were modified, from 12 to 4 years and 7 months in prison for concealment of the crime by a public official. Meanwhile, the sentences against Sergeant Víctor Manuel Salinas and First Sergeant René Eduardo Ardiles to seven and five years in prison, remained unchanged, as they did not appeal their sentences.

== See also ==
- Death of Santiago Maldonado
- List of solved missing person cases (2020s)
