= Murders of Kylen Schulte and Crystal Turner =

2021 unsolved case in Moab, Utah, US

Kylen Schulte
- Born: Kylen Carrol Schulte; September 5, 1996; Vail, Colorado, U.S.
- Died: August 13, 2021 (aged 24); Grand County, Utah, U.S.
- Cause of death: Gunshot wounds
- Resting place: Yellowstone Valley Memorial Park
- Known for: Victim of homicide
- Spouse: Crystal Turner (m. 2021)

Crystal Turner
- Born: Crystal Michelle Turner; December 30, 1982; Hot Springs, Arkansas, U.S.
- Died: August 13, 2021 (aged 38); Grand County, Utah, U.S.
- Cause of death: Gunshot wounds
- Known for: Victim of homicide
- Spouse: Kylen Schulte (m. 2021)

The Murders of Kylen Schulte and Crystal Turner happened on about August 13, 2021, when the married American couple were shot to death while camping near Moab, Utah, United States. Their bodies were discovered on August 18.

Adam Pinkusiewicz was later identified as the key suspect and the case was closed, but he killed himself so no charges were filed. No motive was identified for the killings.

== Background ==
Kylen Schulte (September 5, 1996 – c. August 13, 2021) and Crystal Turner (December 30, 1982 – c. August 13, 2021) were married on April 20, 2021. They often camped with their pet rabbit Ruth.

Two days before they were reported missing, Brian Laundrie and Gabby Petito were stopped by officers of the Moab City Police Department. This fueled speculation of a connection between the cases.

== Murders ==
Schulte and Turner were last seen the night of August 13, 2021, at a bar in Moab around 9:30 pm. The women were described as being deeply in love, with most of their focus and attention dedicated to one another. Witnesses said that no one had followed them out of the bar. After the couple had been out of contact for three days, a local friend received a phone call from Schulte's father, who lives in Montana. The father reported that the couple had moved their campsite, due to an intimidating or unpleasant man described as a "creeper dude". A friend went looking for the couple's campsite in the La Sal Mountains near Moab on August 18, 2021, and was on the phone with Schulte's father when she discovered Schulte's remains.

She called the police yet did not continue to search for Turner. Shortly after Turner's remains were also discovered, right near Schulte's remains. Both women were discovered undressed from the waist down in a creek close to the campsite, with multiple gunshot wounds on their backs, sides, or chests.

== Investigation ==
Responding police found a Kia Sorento, a camping tent, long-term camping tools and supplies, and a makeshift rabbit shelter when they arrived at the scene. They obtained a search warrant for another vehicle; a 1987 Ford Econoline that had been left in the parking lot and later towed. Inside the Ford, they found personal documents and a Bible.

In October 2021, authorities released an affidavit for a search warrant that had been signed in September 2021 and executed within twenty-four hours. It included an investigation into a cell tower at Jimmy Keen Flats, near the campsite between August 13 and 15, only for phones within a 2 mi (3.2 km) radius of the crime scene.

In January 2022, the police announced they had identified a person of interest in the case, but he was cleared the following month.

In March 2022, a private investigator who volunteered to help Schulte's father claimed that law enforcement had obtained an audio recording from near the crime scene, on which gunshots and screams can be heard. Authorities admitted to the audio's existence and confirmed that shots can be heard on it but did not confirm that "screams" are heard. The private investigator alleged also that the audio was recorded at 11:35 a.m. on August 14, 2021, the morning after Turner and Schulte were last seen alive. Police confirmed the date but would not reveal the time of day.

In May 2022, police confirmed there was a likely suspect in the murders named Adam Pinkusiewicz. However, he was reported to have left the state and killed himself after the murders. Pinkusiewicz reportedly confessed to another person and provided details that had not been made public. The motive for the murders remains unknown. According to Schulte's father, the police also found evidence at the crime scene pointing to Pinkusiewicz.

== Reactions ==
The first news release by the Grand County Sheriff's Office, issued on August 19, 2021, claimed that there was "no current danger to the public". This claim was met with skepticism by friends of the couple who believe the statement was to protect the tourism industry while investigating the case. There was also speculation that suspected murderer Brian Laundrie might be connected to the murders. On August 12, Laundrie was confronted by police for allegedly slapping Gabby Petito in front of the Moonflower Community Cooperative in Moab, where Kylen Schulte worked as a cashier. This incident was about one day before Shulte and Turner were killed. Law enforcement ruled out any connection between the two cases.

Schulte's family started a fundraiser to help cover funeral costs for her and directed others to a separate fundraiser for Turner after the fundraiser reached its goal.

== See also ==
- List of solved missing person cases (2020s)
