= Murder of Oluwabamise Ayanwole =

2022 murder in Nigeria

Oluwabamise “Bamise” Ayanwole
- Born: Oluwabamise Toyosi Ayanwole; 2000
- Status: Found deceased
- Died: 2022 (aged 21–22); Lagos, Nigeria
- Body discovered: 7 March 2022
- Occupation: Fashion designer
- Parent(s): Joseph Ayanwole; Comfort Ayanwole

Bamise (Oluwabamise) Toyosi Ayanwole was a young Nigerian woman who was abducted after boarding a BRT in Lagos, Nigeria and found dead 9 days later.

== Background ==
Bamise was 22 years old and the last child of her parents, Joseph and Comfort Ayanwole. She had nine older siblings. She worked as a fashion designer.

== Abduction ==
On 26 February 2022, after leaving work at Ajah area of Lagos State, Bamise boarded a bus rapid transit system at Chevron, Lekki heading to Oshodi on the Lagos mainland around 7:30 pm with the intention of going to visit her elder brother's family to spend the weekend. After boarding the bus, the driver flirted with her and told her to sit at the back. At the time, she was the only passenger in the bus and she observed that the interior was dark. She also noticed that at least two other male passengers entered the bus afterwards. The driver did not pick more passengers. There were no CCTV cameras in the bus. She immediately sent voice notes to her friend via WhatsApp revealing her concerns. She also sent some video recordings of the bus interior with the bus plate number identifier to her friend who advised her to alight as soon as possible at the next bus stop. Afterwards further attempts by her friends and relatives to contact her via phone calls were unsuccessful. Prior to this, one of her last recorded conversations with her friend was ".....Please, pray for me." The following day, she was reported missing. On 7 March 2022, her lifeless body was discovered naked near the Carter Bridge on Lagos Island. An eyewitness stated that Bamise was still alive after she was thrown out of the BRT bus but she couldn't be treated or rushed to the hospital before she died. There are conflicting reports as to whether her corpse was found whole or mutilated.

== Arrest, investigations and aftermath ==
The driver of the BRT was identified as Andrew Nice Omininikoron. He kept mute after the incident. After Bamise's disappearance was made public, he fled and went into hiding in the neighboring Ogun State. He was tracked down and arrested by the Department of State Security Operatives and handed over to the police for questioning and custody. He initially confessed to raping Bamise and abandoning her but he later changed his story, denying any involvement in her murder. He later claimed that his bus was hijacked by armed robbers (referring to the men who entered the bus) who also kidnapped Bamise at gunpoint. His claims have been challenged by Bamise's relatives, friends and some Nigerians who suspect foul play. Accusations of rape and sexual assault have been brought to light by at least two other female victims in similar circumstances. He was arrested and to await trial. His suspected accomplices are also yet to be identified Public protests led to the suspension of BRT Transport operations in Lagos State for some days The Lagos State Governor Babajide Sanwo-Olu vowed to bring the culprits involved in Bamise's murder to book while the Lagos First Lady condemned the incident and voiced her support for installation of CCTV cameras in all BRT buses in the state. There has been public outrage regarding the circumstances leading to Bamise's death and demand for justice on her behalf. Many Nigerians have also voiced concerns about BRT passenger safety and criticized inefficiencies in the Nigerian police system noting that quick intervention might have led to rescue her alive before the murder materialized.

== See also ==
- List of kidnappings
- List of solved missing person cases (2020s)
- List of unsolved murders (2000–present)
