= Disappearance of Jason Landry =

2020 missing person case in Texas, United States

Jason Landry
- Crop of photo of Jason Landry, courtesy of family, from Caldwell County Office of Emergency Management
- Born: July 29, 1999; Missouri City, Texas, United States
- Died: c. December 13, 2020 (aged 21); Caldwell County, Texas, United States
- Education: Texas State University

On December 13, 2020, Jason Landry, a 21-year-old student at Texas State University in San Marcos, Texas, disappeared after his car was found crashed and abandoned along a rural gravel road near Luling, Texas. Landry had been driving from San Marcos to his family home in Missouri City, Texas, but never arrived.

His vehicle was discovered shortly after midnight on Salt Flat Road in Caldwell County, Texas. Several personal belongings, including clothing, were found scattered along the roadway near the crash site, but Landry himself was not located. Despite brief searches by law enforcement and volunteer organizations, he was not initially located.

The disappearance has received regional media coverage and prompted continued search efforts and investigations by state and local authorities. Remains were discovered near the original crash site by a local resident on September 8, 2026 suggesting law enforcement did not do a thorough search in 2020. Testing conducted concluded that the remains belonged to Landry.

== Background ==
Jason Landry grew up in Missouri City, Texas. In 2020 he was a student at Texas State University in San Marcos.

Landry had planned to travel from San Marcos to his family home in Missouri City during the evening of December 13, 2020.

== Disappearance ==
Locations
1 Salt Flat Road near Luling where Landrys car was found.

On the night of December 13, 2020, Landry left San Marcos and began driving toward Missouri City. At approximately midnight, his vehicle, a Nissan Altima, was discovered crashed and abandoned along Salt Flat Road, a rural road near Luling in Caldwell County.

Authorities reported that the crash appeared to involve only Landry's vehicle. Investigators found several of his personal belongings in and near the car, including his clothing scattered along the roadway.

Landry himself was not located at the scene, and there was no immediate evidence explaining where he went after the crash.

=== Timeline of disappearance ===
A detailed timeline of Landry's disappearance was reported by the Austin American-Statesman.

- December 13, 2020, 10:55 p.m.: Landry leaves his San Marcos apartment, intending to drive to his parents’ home in Missouri City. He opens the Waze navigation app to guide his route.
- 11:05 p.m.: According to the Caldwell County Sheriff’s Office, Landry is driving his Nissan Altima on Texas 80 and passes under Interstate 35 in San Marcos.
- 11:15 p.m.: Landry continues south on Texas 80, passing Texas 130 and traveling through small towns including Fentress, Prairie Lea, and Stairtown.
- 11:24 p.m.: Landry enters Luling on Texas 80. At the intersection where Texas 80 becomes Austin Street, he stops using Waze and begins using Snapchat, according to investigators.
- Around 11:30–11:34 p.m.: Authorities believe Landry deviated from his planned route at Magnolia Avenue, driving straight through the intersection toward Salt Flat Road and crashing on that rural road.
- December 14, 2020, 12:31 a.m.: A volunteer firefighter spots Landry’s Altima crashed and abandoned on Salt Flat Road in the 2300 block. The lights were on, the keys were in the ignition, and the front passenger door was locked.
- About 1 a.m.: Texas Department of Public Safety troopers respond roughly an hour after the vehicle’s discovery, continuing initial investigation procedures. Investigators suspect that Landry overcorrected on the gravel road and spun out of control.
- Approximately 5:30 a.m.: Jason’s father, Kent Landry, arrives at an impound yard where the vehicle was taken. He finds Jason’s phone inside the car and later returns to the crash scene to find clothing and personal items scattered on Salt Flat Road, including his backpack and blood-stained shorts.
- Later on December 14: Landry is officially declared missing. Search efforts are mounted by volunteer organizations and law enforcement agencies.
- September 2026: Skeletal remains located by a local resident east of Salt Flat Rd., within the 1400 block of Biggs Rd. in Caldwell county. Later testing revealed the remains belonged to Landry.

== Search and investigation ==
Following the discovery of Landry's vehicle, local law enforcement agencies began search operations in the surrounding rural area. Search efforts included the use of drones, a helicopter with infrared cameras, side-scan sonar, search dogs, and volunteers.

The nonprofit search organization Texas EquuSearch assisted with early search efforts in Caldwell County. After several days of searching without locating Landry, the organization suspended its active search operations.

Three years after Landry's disappearance, the Texas Attorney General's Cold Case and Missing Persons Unit stated that they had conducted an extensive review of the case and concluded that all credible leads had been thoroughly pursued up to that point. It was also stated that the investigation is ongoing and that the public are encouraged to submit credible tips to law enforcement.

== Aftermath ==
Family members and local community members organized prayer vigils and additional searches following Landry's disappearance.

On September 18, 2026, the Caldwell County Sheriff office found skeletal remains within the 1400 block of Biggs Road, around 3.5 miles South of the crash site of Landry's Altima.

On September 23, 2026, State officials confirmed the remains found were Landry’s.

== See also ==
- List of solved missing person cases (2020s)
