= Death of Juliana Marins =

Brazilian publicist and solo traveller (1998/1999–2025)

Juliana Marins
- Born: Juliana de Souza Pereira Marins; 24 August 1998; Niterói, Rio de Janeiro, Brazil
- Died: c. 21 June 2025 (aged 26); Mount Rinjani, Lombok, West Nusa Tenggara, Indonesia
- Occupations: Publicist, traveller

Juliana de Souza Pereira Marins (24 August 1998 – 24 June 2025) was a Brazilian publicist and solo traveller who was making a journey across Southeast Asia. Living in Niterói, in the state of Rio de Janeiro, Marins was on an extended backpacking trip through countries such as the Philippines, Vietnam, Thailand, and Indonesia when she went missing on 21 June 2025 during a hike on Mount Rinjani, a volcano on the island of Lombok, Indonesia. Her death, confirmed three days later, received widespread media coverage in both Brazil and Indonesia.

== Background ==
Mount Rinjani is Indonesia's second-highest volcano and a popular but challenging trekking destination. Ascents typically require two to four days and demand a high level of physical fitness, proper equipment and professional guidance. The region is known for its steep, narrow paths and unpredictable weather, and has been the site of other accidents involving tourists.

== Disappearance ==
On 21 June 2025, Marins went missing while hiking on Mount Rinjani, an active Indonesian volcano with an elevation of 3,726 metres (12,224 ft.). According to her family, Marins suffered from fatigue and asked to rest. She was left alone for more than an hour, and then slipped, falling about 300 metres below the main path.

Later that day, drone footage captured by other hikers revealed her location on a slope below the main trail. The footage confirmed that she was alive and conscious after her initial fall. Due to the rugged terrain, dense fog and low temperatures, emergency crews were initially unable to reach her.

== Rescue operations ==
Search efforts involved Indonesian authorities at the request of the Brazilian government. Brazil's Ministry of Foreign Affairs confirmed that two diplomats had been sent to Indonesia to monitor the situation and provide support to Marins's family. Via drone footage, rescuers had initially established her position on 21 June at a depth of about 300 metres (984 feet), but were unable to reach her. On 22 June, Marins was no longer in her initial position. The next day, her position was identified at a depth of approximately 600 metres (1,968 feet).

Drone footage captured by tourists was instrumental in pinpointing Marins's position. However, rescue teams faced significant challenges, including hazardous slopes, unpredictable weather and limited visibility. Helicopter assistance was considered but ultimately ruled out due to unsafe conditions.

Marins's family disputed reports that she had received aid during the days she remained stranded, stating she was without food, water or thermal protection.

The rescue operation was carried out by the Basarnas teams, the Lotim Brimob SAR Unit, the Forest Police, the EMHC, Lorax, local workers and the Rinjani Squad.

== Death and aftermath ==
On 24 June 2025, Indonesian rescue teams reached Marins's body, and her family confirmed via social media that she had died. Her body, affected by the extreme terrain and adverse weather conditions, was recovered after teams arrived at the location. Agam Rinjani, a volunteer who led one of the rescue teams, told O Globo about the extreme conditions on the mountain, and how his team stayed with Marins overnight on the edge of a 500-metre cliff. On 25 June, her body was removed from the hillside by land, as the weather conditions prevented the use of a helicopter.

The authorities published the results of the autopsy on 27 June, where it was revealed that the cause of death was fractures in various parts of the body, along with haemorrhaging, after one fall, with forensic expert Ida Bagus Alit estimating that death occurred around 20 minutes after the trauma. No signs of hypothermia were found. Mariana Marins, Juliana's sister, says that the family only found out through the media, and that the superficial information contradicts the reports and videos on the mountain.

Marins's remains were repatriated on 1 July. She was buried in Niterói on 4 July.

=== Reactions ===
Marins's death generated public commotion on Brazilian social networks and strong press coverage. Friends and family mobilized campaigns to press for more agility in the rescue. The Itamaraty (Foreign Ministry) confirmed that it was sending two representatives to Indonesia to monitor the operation and support the family. The Itamaraty and various members of the government have expressed their regrets. A group of MPs has filed a request for the Itamaraty to investigate the delay in the rescue. Internally in Indonesia, according to Indonesia Business Post, experts and advocacy groups have started to advocate, among other things, investment in advanced equipment for the rescue team, and bilateral agreements on how to deal with foreign victims in the local tourism sector.

The case had international repercussions, with several press outlets highlighting it. Two days after the death was confirmed, the Indonesian Ministry of Forestry officially expressed its condolences to Juliana's family. BBC Indonesia published a drone video in which the body of Marins was seen, uncensored. Due to the negative reactions on social media, the video was deleted, and a blurred version was published instead.

The issue of transporting Marins's body to Brazil came to a head when Itamaraty announced that, according to Article 259 of Decree 9,199/2017, it is not the ministry's responsibility to pay for the transfer. The city of Niterói offered to bear the costs; however, President Lula announced that he would revoke this decree so that the government would assume responsibility for the expenses. The new decree, number 12.535, with the changes, was published in the Federal Official Gazette on 26 June 2025. However, the family accepted the support of the Niterói city hall.

== See also ==
- List of solved missing person cases (2020s)
