= Disappearance of Hannah Kobayashi =

2024 missing person case in the United States

Hannah Kobayashi
- Born: Hannah Midori Eve Kobayashi; December 24, 1993 (age 32)
- Disappeared: November 8, 2024 (aged 30); Los Angeles, California, U.S.
- Status: Found
- Height: 5 ft 10 in (178 cm)
- Spouse: Alan Cacace
- Father: Ryan Kobayashi

The Disappearance of Hannah Kobayashi was reported on November 12, 2024 after the 30-year-old American woman failed to take a connecting flight after a layover at Los Angeles International Airport (LAX) on November, 8, 2024.

She was identified in surveillance footage from a Los Angeles commuter rail system on November 11, in the company of an unknown person. The next day, Kobayashi was spotted from video footage at a border station crossing into Mexico. She was classified as a voluntary missing person by the Los Angeles Police Department.

Kobayashi was found alive on December 11, 2024, and returned to the United States on December 16.

== Summary ==
Kobayashi arrived at LAX on November 8 for a layover from Maui, Hawaii, as part of a planned vacation to New York City. She did not board her connecting flight and left the airport.

On November 11, Kobayashi's mother sent a text message asking if Hannah had made it to New York. Kobayashi responded in the negative. Her sister told the media how her sister’s friend had contacted the family about unusual text messages Kobayashi reportedly sent, which the friends and family thought were out of character and different from her usual text message writing style. Kobayashi allegedly texted her friend about her ID being stolen and also expressed concern someone "she thought she loved" was trying to take her money.

November 11, 2024 while in the company of an unknown individual at a downtown Los Angeles Metro Rail station.

Hannah's father, Ryan Kobayashi, traveled to Los Angeles to assist in the search for his daughter. He was found dead in a parking lot near LAX on November 24, 2024. He is believed to have died by suicide.

On December 2, 2024, police announced they had identified Kobayashi from video surveillance at a US Customs and Border Protection station at the San Ysidro Port of Entry. The camera system showed Kobayashi crossing the US border into Tijuana, Mexico, on foot, on the afternoon of November 12. She was alone, with her luggage, and appeared unharmed, upon which the LAPD declared her a "voluntary missing person". Earlier, Kobayashi had expressed a desire to disconnect from modern technology. The LAPD observed she had "a right to her privacy, and we respect her choices".

In December 2024, unnamed sources alleged Kobayashi had married an Argentinian man, Alan Cacace, to help him obtain a green card in the United States, as part of a scheme orchestrated by her former partner. Documents discovered by Kobayashi's mother at Hannah's in Hawaii included immigration paperwork and contacts with an immigration attorney, which were subsequently turned over to the Federal Bureau of Investigation and LAPD for investigation. Kobayashi's family continues to seek clarity on her situation, while authorities are investigating the details of the alleged marriage scam. An LAPD spokesperson commented that Kobayashi was not a suspect in any criminal activity.

On December 11, the LAPD reported she was found alive. On December 16, 2024, Kobayashi safely returned to the US on her own.

== See also ==
- List of solved missing person cases (2020s)
