= Murder of Lily Peters =

2022 murder of American child

- Lily Peters
- Location: Chippewa Falls, Wisconsin, U.S.
- Date: April 24, 2022; 4 years ago c. 9 p.m. (CST)
- Attack type: Child murder by strangulation, bludgeoning, child rape, necrophilia
- Weapon: Stick
- Victims: Liliana "Lily" Peters, aged 10
- Perpetrator: Carson Peters-Berger
- Motive: Rape
- Charges: First-degree intentional homicide; First-degree sexual assault; First-degree sexual assault of a child under the age of 13 resulting in great bodily harm
- Verdict: Pleaded guilty to first-degree intentional homicide
- Sentence: Life imprisonment with the possibility of extended supervision after 25 years

On April 24, 2022, Liliana Mae "Lily" Peters (November 4, 2011), a 10-year-old American girl, was murdered and raped by 14-year-old Carson Peters-Berger in Chippewa Falls, Wisconsin. The murder gained significant attention and media coverage due to the ages of both the victim and the perpetrator.

== Murder ==
According to the criminal complaint, the 14-year-old perpetrator, Carson Peters-Berger, asked his cousin, 10-year-old Lily Peters, to take a walk and explore a trail. She took her bike and he took his hoverboard. Once they were off the trail, it is alleged that he punched her in the stomach and pushed her to the ground, then hit her on the head three times with a large stick and strangled her until she was dead. Peters-Berger then allegedly raped her dead body.

The criminal complaint alleged that Peters-Berger then became scared and fled, went home, showered, and cleaned his clothes, then went back to the scene and dragged Lily's body a few feet and covered it with leaves.

== Investigation ==
Lily was reported missing by her father when she did not return home the evening of April 24, and her body was discovered the following morning.

A day before the arrest of Peters-Berger, a woman entered the police station, saying a Reddit user shared they saw Lily walking with a teenager, thus giving the police a lead on the case. On April 26, the suspect, Carson Peters-Berger, was arrested and charged with first-degree homicide and first-degree sexual assault. According to authorities, he confessed to murdering Lily and that it was his plan the entire time to murder and rape her. His bail was set at $1 million. If convicted, he would face a sentence of life in prison.

In January 2024, it was determined that the suspect would be tried as an adult. The trial was set to take place in November 2026; however, on August 5, the Chippewa County District Attorney’s Office confirmed that a resolution to resolve the matter without a trial had been reached and that a resolution hearing was scheduled for August 26.

On August 26, 2026, Peters-Berger pled guilty to first-degree intentional homicide. He was sentenced to life in prison with the possibility of parole after 25 years.

== See also ==
- List of solved missing person cases (2020s)
