= Murder of Jeff Machado =

2023 case involving Jeff Machado

Jeff Machado case
- Location: Campo Grande, Rio de Janeiro, Brazil
- Date: January 2023; 3 years ago
- Attack type: Homicide by asphyxiation
- Victim: Jeff Machado
- Accused: Bruno de Souza Rodrigues; Jeander Vinícius da Silva Braga

In January 2023, Brazilian journalist and actor Jeff Machado was killed in the Campo Grande neighborhood, in the city of Rio de Janeiro, at the age of 44. His body was discovered on 22 May 2023, buried inside a trunk two meters deep and covered with a thick layer of concrete.

On 1 June 2023, an arrest warrant was issued for Bruno de Souza Rodrigues and Jeander Vinícius da Silva Braga for homicide and concealment of a corpse (Ocultação de cadáver). Rodrigues and Vinícius were arrested on 2 and 15 June respectively.

The case was the subject of reports on Fantástico and on Domingo Espetacular on 28 May 2023. "A story that continues to impress, mainly because of the details of cruelty", said the presenter of Domingo Espetacular. Other programs such as Primeiro Impacto and Brasil Urgente also highlighted the case.

== Jeff Machado ==
Jeff Machado
- Born: Jefferson Machado da Costa; 19 January 1979; Araranguá, Santa Catarina, Brazil
- Died: c. 23 January 2023 (aged 44); Rio de Janeiro, Rio de Janeiro, Brazil
- Cause of death: Asphyxiation

Jefferson Machado da Costa, known professionally as Jeff Machado, was born in Araranguá, Santa Catarina on 19 January 1979. He was a journalist and actor and had worked on the soap opera Reis, on RecordTV. In 1997, Machado had moved from Santa Catarina to Rio de Janeiro to pursue an acting career. He returned to his home state, specifically to Florianópolis, in 2008, when he returned to work in the field of journalism. Later, in 2014, he moved back to Rio and got a job at telenovela Reis in 2021–2022. Machado was passionate about setter dogs, he had eight dogs in the house where he lived, in the neighborhood of Guaratiba.

About four years before his death, Machado met Rodrigues, who presented himself as an artistic producer at Globo, where he had actually worked until 2018. Rodrigues harassed Machado financially, saying that he would get a contract between the actor and the broadcaster for payment. In December 2022, Rodrigues rented a house on Rua Itueira, in the Campo Grande neighborhood, in the West Zone of Rio, about 20 km (12 mi) from the actor's house, where he lived. He renovated the residence, raising the walls. A neighbor said he saw the victim there a few times. In January Machado met Vinícius on a dating app and the call boy started to frequent the actor's house.

== Crime ==
Machado disappeared on 23 January 2023. His mother, Maria das Dores, revealed to Fantástico on May 28 that Diego, the actor's brother, had still spoken to him on 23 January. "It was the last day we heard Jefferson's voice. He called me every day", said Machado's mother, who began to wonder when she started receiving only text messages. On one of them was written: "my phone fell into the toilet" and Maria das Dores suspected "private? This is not Jefferson's word". He also sent word that he would be moving to São Paulo to work and when his mother asked about the dogs, he replied that he would leave the animals with friends. "Jefferson wasn't going to leave the dogs with friends. This isn't right," said Machado's mother.

The family's distrust increased on 27 January, after Machado's eight dogs were seen roaming the streets near their home. They were taken in by an NGO that reached Machado and then his family through the animal chips. “When the family and I found out how he had disappeared, we were practically sure of what had happened. (...) The last person who saw him, who supposedly was with him, never gave support when we were looking for Jeff", said Cintia Hilsendeger, a friend of Machado and the family, to the program Melhor da Tarde.

The family was informed on 24 May, that Machado's body had been found.

== Investigation ==
As Rodrigues avoided contact with the victim's relatives, Diego, the victim's brother, traveled to Rio de Janeiro. There he registered the occurrence, accompanied by the accused, and discovered that Rodrigues had the keys to Jeff's house. Rodrigues justified having the keys at the actor's request and used the same excuse to justify having other assets of the victim.

The Whereabouts Discovery Police Station (DDPA) began investigations, and, upon hearing witnesses, such as the owner of the NGO that rescued the dogs and was a friend of the actor, ended up suspecting that the disappearance was not voluntary. Another friend received a message from a man who identified himself as Giovani saying that Machado had abandoned the dogs, but he also did not believe the story.

One day after his disappearance, a post was made on Machado's Instagram account, with the caption "Reenergizing. Gratitude!", including several hashtags. This procedure was repeated a week later, on 2 February, with the caption "Restart. Gratitude!", raising suspicions from fans and friends, especially because the answers in some comments contained spelling errors, which was not common according to people close to Machado. Also in the same week, an alleged farewell letter was published on the actor's account.

Machado's body was found on Rua Itueira, Campo Grande, West Zone of Rio, on 22 May. The victim had been buried and concreted two meters deep inside a trunk, which, according to police findings, was the same as the one at Jeff's residence, which increased suspicions that the crime had been committed by someone known to the actor. The body was in the fetal position, naked, with its hands tied above its head and a wire around its neck. The police already had evidence that Rodrigues had extorted Machado for 20,000 reais by promising him a role in a soap opera on Globo. According to Hilsendeger, Machado had discovered that other people had also been victims of Rodrigues. "Jeff found out that everything was a lie [the contract with Globo] and ended up dead", said the presenter of Domingo Espetacular. "There were movements after his disappearance. The house and car keys and the cards were with Bruno", said the family's lawyer, adding that Rodrigues voluntarily hired lawyers to follow the case, which raised even more suspicions.

=== Depositions ===
Rodrigues and Vinicius gave statements between 26 and 27 May and Rodrigues initially denied involvement. Vinicius, however, said he had helped to transport and bury the body, but did not reveal who the other people were. The name of a third person, said to be a militiaman named Marcelo, was later mentioned, but the police immediately believed that the story had been invented as a defense strategy. In the depositions both also said that Jeff would have been killed during the recording of a scene with sexual content that would be displayed on pornography portals. Hours after being arrested, on June 2, Vinicius changed the version of the story and said that Rodrigues had drugged and killed the actor and that both had hidden the corpse. He also changed his version of the sex scene recording history, denying that they had sex. However, the coroner's report confirmed that Machado was killed after having sexual intercourse.

According to the DDPA police, Rodrigues killed Machado after hitting the actor.

=== Accused ===
- Bruno de Souza Rodrigues - 37 years old; he was known in the artistic world as Bruno Larrubia and had worked at Rede Globo until 2018; had been known to Jeff for four years
- Jeander Vinicius da Silva Braga - 29 years old; mason, baker and call boy; frequented Machado's house

== Arrest, trial and imprisonment ==
On 31 May, Bruno de Souza Rodrigues and Jeander Vinícius da Silva Braga were indicted. On 1 June, the Public Ministry (MP) of Rio de Janeiro asked for the arrest of both. Vinícius was arrested on June 2 in the Santíssimo neighborhood, in the West Zone of Rio, after trying to flee.

Rodrigues was on the run and his name was entered the Interpol list. He was finally found on 15 June, hiding in a building in Morro do Vidigal, in the South Zone of Rio de Janeiro. He would have been denounced by drug dealers, according to G1, despite the fact that the police had been monitoring him for 5 days at the scene, after he was located for using a Wi-Fi network.

On 27 October 2023, the trial of defendants Bruno de Souza Rodrigues and Jeander Vinicius da Silva Braga began with 18 witnesses, including Machado's mother and brother.

Jeander da Silva Braga was found guilty of murder and concealment of a corpse in July 2026 and sentenced to 22 years in prison. Bruno de Souza Rodrigues was granted a separate trial, scheduled for December 2026.

== See also ==
- List of solved missing person cases (2020s)
