= James Dean (footballer) =

English footballer (1985–2021)

Personal information
- Full name: James Andrew Dean
- Date of birth: 15 May 1985
- Place of birth: Blackburn, England
- Date of death: May 2021 (aged 35)
- Place of death: Oswaldtwistle, England
- Height: 6 ft 3 in (1.91 m)
- Position: Forward

Senior career*
Years	Team	Apps	(Gls)
2003–2006	Great Harwood Town		
2006–2007	Clitheroe		
2007	Northwich Victoria		
2007–2008	Bury	4	(0)
2007	→ Altrincham (loan)	3	(1)
2007–2008	→ Stalybridge Celtic (loan)	11	(4)
2008	Stalybridge Celtic	13	(4)
2008	Hyde United	8	(2)
2008–2009	Harrogate Town		
2009–2012	FC Halifax Town		
2012–2013	AFC Fylde		
2013–2016	Chorley		
2016	→ Ashton United (loan)	2	(1)
2016	Warrington Town		
2016–2017	Padiham		
2017–2018	Trafford		
2018–2019	Padiham		
2019	Bamber Bridge	6	(4)
- * Club domestic league appearances and goals

James Andrew Dean (15 May 1985 – May 2021) was an English footballer who played as a forward for various clubs including Bury, Stalybridge Celtic, Chorley and Bamber Bridge.

== Career ==
Dean began his career with Great Harwood Town, making his debut for the club on 8 April 2003, alongside future Premier League player Matt Derbyshire, in a 2–0 win against Daisy Hill. In the summer of 2006, Dean signed for Clitheroe. Dean left Clitheroe in January 2007, signing for Northwich Victoria for a "four-figure fee".

In the summer of 2007, Dean signed for Bury. During his time at the club, Dean made four Football League appearances. In February 2008, following loan spells at Altrincham and Stalybridge Celtic, Dean terminated his contract with Bury via mutual consent. Following his release from Bury, Dean rejoined Stalybridge Celtic until the end of the 2007–08 season.

Following his time at Stalybridge, Dean signed for Hyde United, before moving to Harrogate Town. In 2009, Dean joined FC Halifax Town, playing for the club for three years, before signing for AFC Fylde in 2012. In 2013, Dean joined Chorley, helping the club to promotion to the Conference North in his first season at the club. In March 2016, Dean joined Ashton United on loan from Chorley. In total, he made 130 appearances for Chorley, scoring 60 goals. Following his time at Chorley, Dean signed for Warrington Town in May 2016. Dean's time at Warrington was short lived, with Dean joining Padiham on 1 September 2016. In May 2017, Dean signed for Trafford, before returning to Padiham in June 2018. Dean joined Buxton in November 2018, making his debut in a 5–0 home defeat to Witton Albion. Dean played for Buxton for the remainder of the season. On 29 October 2019, Bamber Bridge announced the signing of Dean.

== Personal life and death ==
During his early non-League career, Dean was an English champion kickboxer.

On 6 May 2021, Dean was reported missing, with Lancashire Constabulary issuing an appeal for his whereabouts. He was last seen on 5 May in Oswaldtwistle near Blackburn. His body was found by Lancashire Police on 9 May, and his death was announced the next day. He was 35. The police announced his death was not being treated as suspicious. Warrington Town chairman Toby Macormac set up a crowdfunding campaign to provide support for Dean's family. The campaign reached over £12,000.

== See also ==
- List of solved missing person cases (2020s)
- List of unsolved deaths
