= Killing of Naomi Irion =

2022 homicide by shooting in Fernley, Nevada, United States

- Location of murder (Nevada)
- Location: 39.61033°N 119.21729°W (kidnapping); Fernley, Nevada, United States
- Date: March 12, 2022; 4 years ago 5:25 a.m. (PST; UTC−08:00)
- Attack type: Homicide by shooting, kidnapping
- Weapon: Firearm
- Victim: Naomi Irion
- Accused: Troy Driver

The Killing of Naomi Irion happened on or about March 12, 2022, when 18-year-old American woman Naomi Irion disappeared from a Walmart parking lot in Fernley, Nevada, United States. She was found dead two weeks later in a shallow gravesite in rural Churchill County, having been kidnapped, sexually assaulted, and shot to death.

Troy Driver was arrested as a suspect in the Irion case. The 41-year-old man had a history of criminal charges. He died of suicide while in custody, and was never formally convicted of killing Irion but authorities announced the evidence against him was overwhelming and they considered the case closed.

== Personal life ==
Naomi Irion moved across the world as a child because her father, Herve Irion, worked for the US State Department. The family relocated to France, Russia, Germany, and South Africa, before Naomi returned to the United States as an adult. When in South Africa, Irion attended the American International School of Johannesburg where she graduated in 2021. Irion had three younger brothers, who were adopted from Ukraine in 2018. Another brother, Sean Michael Irion, died in infancy in 2002.

Irion was an avid fan of music, singing and playing the ukulele and guitar. Her favourite colour was the rainbow, and she often wore rainbow clothing and had rainbows on her jackets and bag.

Irion died between 12 and 29 March 2022, when she was 18.

== Events ==
=== Kidnapping ===
Naomi Christine Irion's FBI Missing poster

Around 5:00 a.m. (PST; UTC−08:00) on Saturday, March 12, 2022, Irion parked her vehicle in the Walmart parking lot in Fernley, Nevada. According to her sister, she was waiting for a shuttle to take her to her job. She was active on social media between 5:09 and 5:23 a.m. At 5:24 a.m., surveillance footage showed a man approaching Irion's vehicle and entering. A minute later, the vehicle left the parking lot with the man driving. The male was wearing a gray hooded sweatshirt, "dark pants or jeans," and dark tennis shoes. At the time of the disappearance, Irion was described as being 5 ft 11 in (1.80 m) with dyed black hair and green eyes. She was wearing a blue shirt, gray sweater, dark boots, and gray sweatpants.

=== Search and discovery of body ===
On March 15, three days after Irion disappeared, her four-door sedan was discovered in an industrial area near Fernley. Police stated they were searching for a suspect driving a "dark, newer model" Chevrolet Silverado High Country truck. Irion's sedan was searched and analyzed forensically. Law enforcement conducted many searches on the ground and by air. On March 28, the Federal Bureau of Investigation (FBI) announced they would be offering a reward of up to US$10,000 for information leading to Irion's location. The Bureau put Irion on their Most Wanted Kidnapping and Missing Persons list.

On March 29, police received a tip connected to Irion's disappearance that led them to a rural site in Churchill County. They recovered a body, which was later confirmed to be Irion's.

== Investigation ==
On March 25, police arrested 41-year-old Troy Driver, a resident of Fallon. Driver had a lengthy juvenile criminal history, including pleading guilty to being an accomplice to murder and a series of armed robberies at age 17.

=== Legal proceedings ===
Driver was initially taken into custody on kidnapping charges and had his bond set to US$750,000, but was charged with murder, first-degree kidnapping, robbery, burglary of a motor vehicle and destruction of evidence after Irion's body was discovered. A criminal complaint alleged that Driver kidnapped Irion and shot her to death before burying her body to avoid leaving evidence. He reportedly disposed of Irion's phone and replaced his truck's tires.

In July 2022, Driver was charged with sexual assault, as prosecutors alleged he raped Irion before killing her. In November, he was found mentally fit to stand trial for the killing of Irion.

On August 6, 2023, Driver was found dead in his cell when prison personnel arrived for a routine inmate check. His death was ruled a suicide by asphyxiation. While he was never convicted, officials said the evidence against him was overwhelming. Forensic evidence, including his DNA, were found on Irion's body. Driver also left a note in which he apologized for the "darkness within" himself.

== See also ==
- List of kidnappings
- List of solved missing person cases (2020s)
- List of unsolved murders (2000–present)
