= Death of Parker Wells =

2026 death in Calgary, Alberta

Parker Wells
- Born: 2014
- Disappeared: July 16, 2026; Connaught Drive Northwest, Calgary, Alberta, Canada
- Died: c. July 16, 2026 (aged 11); Deerfoot Trail, Calgary, Alberta, Canada
- Body discovered: July 29, 2026
- Known for: Going missing for 13 days and being found dead in a drainage pipe

On July 16, 2026, Parker Wells, an 11-year-old autistic and nonverbal boy from Calgary, Alberta, Canada, went missing after wandering away from his dayhome in Calgary's north end on Connaught Drive Northwest, in the middle of the afternoon. Thousands of community volunteers, police, and firefighters scoured the city, carrying out one of the largest missing-person searches in Calgary. Following a 13-day search, a member of the public found children's shoes near a culvert in Deerfoot Trail. He was found dead in a network of concrete pipes on July 29, 2026.

== Background ==
Parker Wells was born in 2014 in Calgary, Alberta, Canada. He was diagnosed with nonverbal autism. Family and public descriptions noted Wells functioned at the developmental level of a toddler, and was prone to elopement. He was fascinated with water, traffic, and shiny objects. Those who knew him said he may have had trouble responding to his name or became scared if strangers approached him. He was described as being special needs, and required specialized care.

== Disappearance ==
On July 16, 2026, Wells eloped from a specialized day care provider in northern Calgary on Connaught Drive Northwest, just before 12:00 p.m. He is believed to have left the residence on foot. Just prior to 1:00 p.m., on Travis Crescent Northeast, closed-circuit television footage captured a recording of Wells walking down a sidewalk, approximately 11 km (6.8 mi) from his original location. Wells was reported missing later that day, and an Amber Alert was issued over the province via the Alberta Emergency Alert system on July 18, 2026. Wells was described as 4 ft 11 in (150 cm) tall, weighed about 90 lb (41 kg) with brown hair, a shaved head and brown eyes.

== Search ==
The searches for Wells began a few hours after his disappearance. Many community volunteers, police, and firefighters searched around the city, carrying out many searches across several parts of it. During these searches, Calgary Police played some of Wells' favourite Disney songs from patrol vehicles in the search area, with hopes for the music to attract his attention and encourage him to come out if he was nearby. His family released a statement and new photos the same afternoon, asking Calgarians to check yards, sheds, garages, and hot tubs, and instructions were given to observers not to approach him if seen, and to call 911.

== Discovery ==
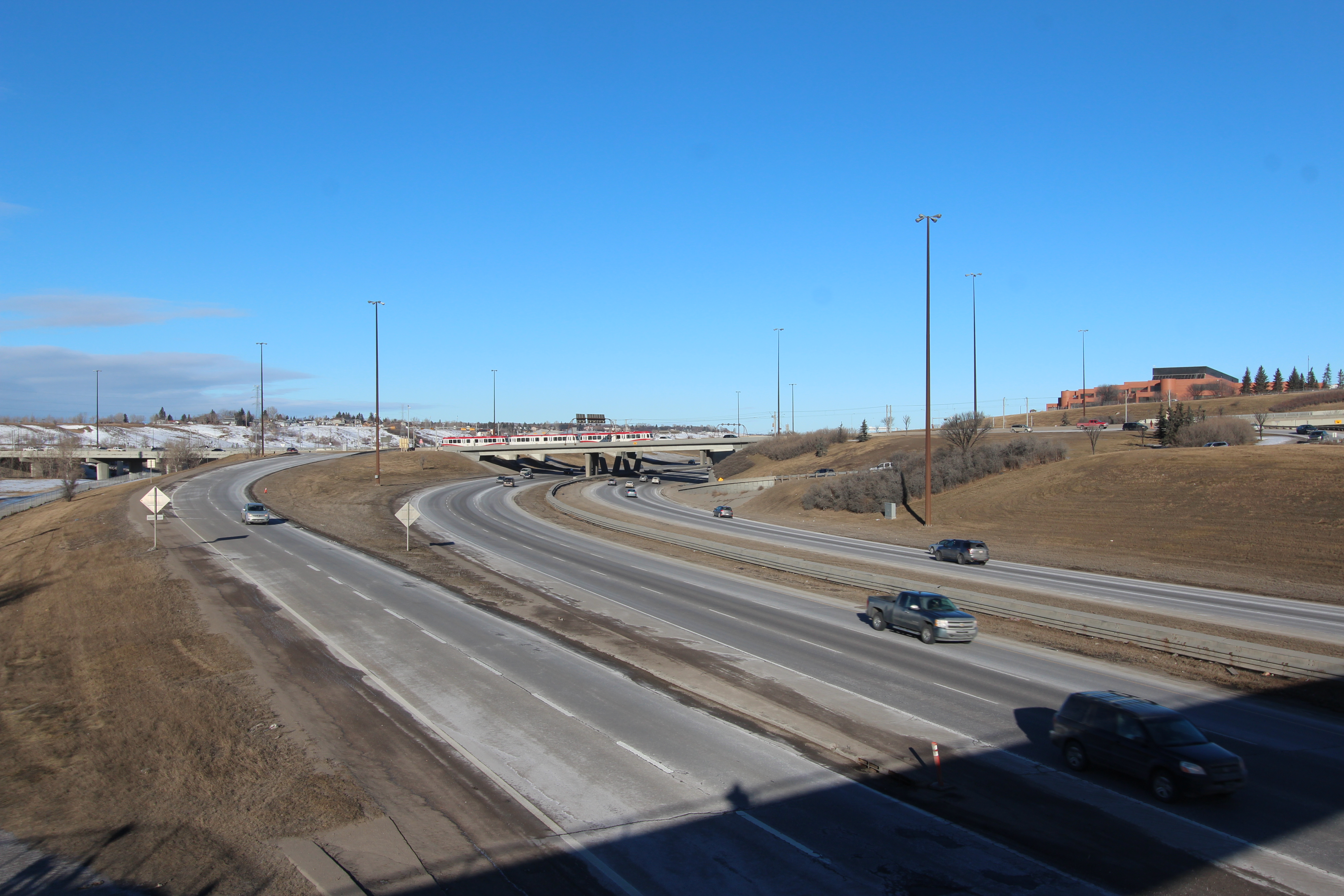
The freeway in which Wells was found dead in July 2026

On the afternoon of July 29, 2026, 13 days after Wells' disappearance, his clothing and shoes were found just outside of a culvert that lead to a series of drainage pipes and tunnels. Investigators believe Wells entered a 4 ft (120 cm) concrete culvert on the west side of Deerfoot Trail and traveled through the narrowing pipes. Search teams were directed to look deeper into the hazardous underground network, using protective gear to enter the tunnels. The remains of Wells were recovered 450 ft (140 m) inside the small pipe system.

== Aftermath and investigation ==
Following the incident, investigators ruled his death as an accidental misadventure, stating that no foul play or criminality was involved. An important conversation was sparked about the risks of elopement among neurodivergent children, and the need for a special Amber Alert to help locate vulnerable individuals more quickly. A memorial was established between Blackthorn Road Northeast and 60 Avenue Northeast, with Wells' name, graffitied in blue on a retaining wall near Memorial Drive. On July 30, 2026, the Calgary Tower was lit blue after dark, the colour associated with autism awareness. A GoFundMe campaign was started by his uncle, Brad Brown. Brown said it in a Facebook post in which he shared a link to the fundraiser. In just one day, the campaign rose near $100,000, and Brown claimed donations will ease financial burdens as the family heals, including funeral and memorial expenses, travel, lost income, counseling, and other costs.

On August 6, 2026, a member of Diverse Mom Connect suggested identifying areas that can be blocked off or more inaccessible, as well as installing visual signage that can help neurodivergent children recognize places they should avoid if they elope. Another suggestion was putting a grid to block off the areas so children cannot crawl into those spaces to hide, play or rest. On August 10, 2026, following Wells' death, the Government of Alberta reviewed the existing Amber Alert criteria and cases involving missing vulnerable people, introducing an emergency notification tier separate from traditional Amber Alerts, called an "Indigo Alert", in place for when a vulnerable, non-verbal, or neurodivergent person prone to elopement goes missing.

On August 26, 2026, the city of Calgary took down the temporary memorials for Wells, causing widespread protest. The city said the mural met the definition of graffiti under its bylaws, so administration was required to remove them.

On September 22, 2026, an internal city review determined that 911 dispatch mistakes may have delayed searches for Wells. They determined that when the first call was made, the search for Wells was delayed roughly one hour. City officials claimed that the calls examined dispatcher actions, decision making, and adherence to operational policies, resulting in a lapse in adherence in procedure rather than a lack of prescribed procedure, implementing measures to prevent this from happening.
