= Murder of Nicolly Pogere =

2025 child murder in Brazil

- Undated picture of Nicolly
- Native name: Assassinato de Nicolly Pogere
- Location: Hortolândia, São Paulo, Brazil
- Date: c. July 12, 2025 (Murder and dismemberment); July 18, 2025 (Discovery of torso and head); July 24, 2025 (Discovery of legs and arms)
- Target: Nicolly Fernanda Pogere
- Attack type: Murder by stabbing and bludgeoning; Dismemberment
- Weapons: Two kitchen knives; Sledgehammer
- Deaths: 1
- Perpetrators: 17-year-old Male; 14-year-old Female
- Motive: Crime of passion
- Verdict: Guilty
- Convictions: 3 Years preventive detention

On 12 July 2025, Nicolly Fernanda Pogere, a 15-year-old Brazilian teenager residing in Mococa, Brazil, was murdered and partially dismembered by her ex-boyfriend and his girlfriend, her body was hidden on a retention pond in Hortolândia wrapped around blankets and a blue canvas tied to rocks in an effort to conceal her body underwater. Nicolly's torso and head was found on July 18, while her arms and legs were found on July 24.

== Disappearance and discovery of body ==
The 15-year-old, who resided in Mococa with her family, originally travelled to Hortolândia on June 29, 2025, to visit her grandfather and spend some time at her boyfriend's house. She stayed a few days with her boyfriend and was supposed to return on July 14. Shortly before that, Nicolly's family lost contact with her, so they contacted her boyfriend who had told them Nicolly had left on July 12 after they broke up and that he hadn't heard from her since. After Nicolly didn't return home that day, her grandfather reported her missing, beginning the search.

On July 18, Nicolly's torso and head were found by the municipal guards sniffer dog while searching near a retention pond. Her body was wrapped in two blankets and a blue canvas, the canvas was tied to rocks in an effort to conceal her body underwater, and the initials "PCC" were carved onto her back in an effort to conceal the perpetrator's true identity. Nicolly's body had deep cuts in the abdomen, multiple stab wounds and chronic traumatic encephalopathy, something police said to be "evident signs of extreme violence".

On July 24, a municipal cleaning crew that was mowing grass near the pond where Nicolly's body was originally discovered found two trash bags containing arms and legs. The police would soon contact Nicolly's family, who identified the remains as being Nicolly's due to the distinct pair of sneakers she had been wearing at the time of her disappearance.

== Investigations ==
Investigations begun after the civil police found traces of human blood on the 17-year-old perpetrator's house. He would soon flee with his 14-year-old girlfriend to his grandmother's house, located in Cornélio Procópio, Paraná after alleging to his father that he had been sent death threats from "some guy [sic] from São Paulo". After a joint collaboration between the two states' polices, both were apprehended on July 20, 2025. The canvas and both blankets which Nicolly's body had been wrapped with were confirmed to be the male perpetrator's via his father. The male perpetrator's grandmother unknowingly helped hide both perpetrators after they simply stated they were "Kicked out of the house".

When first interrogated, both perpetrators originally alleged self-defense, saying Nicolly hadn't accepted the end of her relationship with the 17-year-old and had grabbed a knife in an attempt to stab both of them, so, in an act of self defense, they stabbed Nicolly until she was on the ground. They also alleged that they didnt mean to kill Nicolly but after realizing they did they decided to dismember her and hide her remains in a nearby pond, moving her body with a wheelbarrow. All investigations pointed to the fact that Nicolly had been lured to the 17-year-old's house and that the crime was premeditated and passional, with the 14-year-old messaging Nicolly's stepfather pretending to be one of her friends, asking for her social media. As of 2026, police are investigating the existence of a possible third perpetrator and if the crime was broadcast online.

== Aftermath ==
Nicolly's body was buried on July 20 in the Mococa municipal cemetery. No wake was performed prior to Nicolly's funeral due to her body missing her upper and lower limbs at the time. Nicolly's family and friends accompanied her casket until her burial site with white balloons and signs containing pictures of the perpetrators. Prior to her casket being lowered, her family sung "Um anjo do céu", a song by brazilian reggae band Maskavo which Priscila sung while she was pregnant with Nicolly, and recited the Lord's Prayer while her casket was being lowered.

On April 13, 2026, an interstate operation by the civil police arrested 5 people, one adult and four minors, due to online harassment and death threats Nicolly's family members had been subjected to, especially Nicolly's mother, Priscila Magrin.

As of 2026, both perpetrators are serving three year sentences, the harshest criminal penalty available for minors in Brazil, in Fundação Casa Andorinhas, a juvenile detention center located in Campinas.
