= Janikhel =

Coordinates: 32°47′55″N 70°30′23″E

- Town and union council
- Interactive map of Janikhel
- Country: Pakistan
- Province: Khyber Pakhtunkhwa
- District: Bannu District
- Time zone: UTC+5 (PST)

Janikhel (Pashto: جاني‌خېل), also spelled Jani Khel or Zonikhel (ځوني‌خېل) is a town and union council in the Bannu District of Khyber Pakhtunkhwa, Pakistan. It is located at 32°47'55N 70°30'23E and has an elevation of 336 metres (1105 feet).

== Janikhel protest ==
On 21 March 2021, mutilated corpses of four teenage boys were found in the Seentanga area of Janikhel. The locals protested for a week against the killings along with the dead bodies, which was followed by a planned long march from Janikhel to Peshawar and Islamabad. The protesters complained that several military operations were carried out against militants in the region, yet kidnappings and targeted killings frequently occurred. Their main demands were:

- A government guarantee that the Taliban and other militants would not be permitted to operate in the area
- Lodging of an FIR against the security official in whose jurisdiction the murders took place

On 29 March, as the protesters had reached Domel in Bannu, the long march was postponed after an agreement was signed with them by Mahmood Khan, the Chief Minister of Khyber Pakhtunkhwa. On 31 May, Malik Naseeb Khan, a tribal chief of Janikhel, was shot dead by militants, which sparked another wave of protest along with the dead body of the slain chieftain. On 23 June, a protester named Wahid Khan was shot dead and several others were injured as the police blocked the protesters from marching towards Islamabad. On 27 June, the tribesmen postponed the protest again after the authorities released four missing men from Janikhel who had been victims of enforced disappearance.
