= List of major crimes in Italy =

This page presents, in a non-exhaustive manner, notorious or significant Italian criminal cases whose developments that have taken place. Types of crime include murders, rape, theft, kidnappings and other high-profile criminal trials and miscellaneous crime.

== Terrorism ==
Date	Place	Case	Summary	Convictions and comments
19 July 1992	Palermo	Via D'Amelio bombing	6 people were killed in a car bombing.	
27 May 1993	Florence	Via dei Georgofili bombing	5 people were killed in a car bombing.	
27 July 1993	Milan	Via Palestro massacre	5 people were killed in a car bombing.	
19 May 2012	Brindisi	Brindisi school bombing	5 people were injured in a bombing, one was killed.	
3 February 2018	Macerata	Macerata shooting	6 people were injured in a shooting.	
20 March 2019	Crema	2019 Italian bus hijack	A school bus was hijacked by its driver Ousseynou Sy, who attempted to set it on fire. Sy, whose origins are Senegalese, said his motive was to avenge the deaths of African migrants in the Mediterranean Sea. Police freed the children before he set the vehicle on fire.	

== Missing person cases ==
Date	Place	Case	Summary	Convictions and comments
16 September 1970	Palermo	Disappearance of Mauro De Mauro	An investigative journalist with the left-leaning newspaper L'Ora in Palermo who disappeared.	2006 trial but the mystery remains.
7 May 1983	Rome	Disappearance of Mirella Gregori	A 15-year-old girl who went missing in Rome.	Unsolved as of 2026
22 June 1983	Rome	Disappearance of Emanuela Orlandi	A 15-year-old girl who went missing in Rome.	Unsolved as of 2026
12 September 1993	Potenza	Murder of Elisa Claps	A 16-year-old who went missing in Potenza.	Danilo Restivo murdered her and hid the body in the Chiesa della Santissima Trinità.
10 August 1996	Monte Faito, Naples	Disappearance of Angela Celentano	A 3-year-old child who went missing on a trip organised by the Evangelical Community of Vico Equense.	Unsolved as of 2026

== Individual murders ==
=== 20th century ===
Date	Place	Case	Summary	Convictions and comments
September 1944		Holohan murder case		
May 1988	Calabria	Gruppo del Rosario	The leader of the apocalyptic cult, Lidia Naccarato, was arrested along with 35 members, following the brutal murder of a fellow member.	
10 July 1991	Rome	Murder of Alberica Filo della Torre	A 42-year-old housewife was murdered in her own home.	Solved in 2011 when DNA evidence pointed to Manuel Winston Reyes, a Filipino former employee of the family. He was released on 11 October 2021.
6 May 1996	Chiavari	Murder of Nada Cella	A 25-year-old woman who was found dead at her place of work on the morning.	The case was solved in 2026.

=== 21st century ===
Date	Place	Case	Summary	Convictions and comments
21 February 2001	Novi Ligure	Novi Ligure murder	A 41-year-old woman and her 11-year-old son were stabbed to death by her daughter and her boyfriend.	The daughter Erika De Nardo blamed the murders on immigrants but she and her boyfriend were suspected. Both were subsequently tried for the murders and convicted. They were sentenced to 16 and 14 years in prison.
2 March 2006	Parma	Murder of Tommaso Onofri	A 16-month old baby, was kidnapped from his family home in order to obtain a ransom, in the mistaken belief that his parents had access to significant economic resources; however, the kidnappers killed the child a few minutes after the kidnapping.	The true nature of the crime emerged about a month later, when bricklayer Mario Alessi, who had previously worked at the Onofri house, and his accomplice Salvatore Raimondi, confessed to the crime and indicated to police the place where the body had been hidden. Together with Alessi and Raimondi, the bricklayer's partner, Antonella Conserva, was also sentenced.
1 November 2007	Perugia	Murder of Meredith Kercher	A 21-year-old British woman who was murdered in her bedroom while on student-exchange from the University of Leeds.	Amanda Knox was convicted in a trial which was highly publicized between Knox's conviction in 2009 and her acquittal two years later. In October 2008, Rudy Guede was found guilty for the sexual assault and murder of Meredith Kercher and was sentenced to 30 years’ imprisonment.
11 November 2007	Civitella in Val di Chiana	Murder of Gabriele Sandri	A football fan was shot and killed by a police officer.	What followed were nationwide scenes of violence.
26 August 2010	Avetrana	Murder of Sarah Scazzi	Fifteen-year-old Sarah Scazzi was strangled by her cousin Sabrina Misseri and her aunt Cosima Serrano, who then hid the body together with her father Michele Misseri, staging a kidnapping by a third party.	
29 November 2014	Santa Croce Camerina	Murder of Lorys Stival	An 8-year-old boy, Lorys Andrea Stival, was strangled by his mother who staged a kidnapping.	Veronica Panarello was definitively sentenced to thirty years in prison for the murder of her son.
9 January 2016	Florence	Murder of Ashley Ann Olsen	A 35-year-old American woman living in Florence who was strangled in her apartment in January 2016.	Cheik Tidiane Diaw, a 27-year-old Senegalese national who recently entered Italy as an illegal immigrant, was convicted of murder and sentenced to 30 years in prison.
29 January 2018	Macerata	Murder of Pamela Mastropietro	An 18-year-old woman disappeared and was found dismembered inside a suitcase the next day.	Innocent Oseghale, a Nigerian drug dealer, was convicted and sentenced to life in prison with 18 months of isolation in May 2019.
5 March 2018	Florence	Murder of Idy Diene	A Senegalese market trader was shot dead. The shooter, who was identified as Roberto Pirrone, turned himself in to the police.	While the police have deemed that the shooting was not racially or politically motivated, local African immigrant communities have held protests, citing the murder as prejudiced.
18 October 2018	Rome	Murder of Desirée Mariottini	A 16-year-old girl who was drugged, raped and murdered by African migrants.	Four men were convicted.
26 July 2019	Rome	Murder of Mario Cerciello Rega	An Italian police officer who was murdered by two American students visiting Rome.	In July 2024, after a retrial ordered by the Corte di Cassazione in 2023, their conviction was upheld by the Court of Appeal with reduced sentences of 15 years 2 months and 11 years 4 months respectively.
25 August 2019	Carpaneto Piacentino	Murder of Elisa Pomarelli	A 28-year-old woman who was murdered in a case which resulted in great indignation, public demonstrations, and stimulated the cultural debate on homophobia and violence against women in Italy.	Massimo Sebastiani stood trial and was sentenced to 20 years in prison.
29 December 2020	Frassilongo	Murder of Agitu Ideo Gudeta	An Ethiopian farmer, entrepreneur and environmentalist was murdered.	
29 July 2022	Civitanova Marche	Murder of Alika Ogorchukwu	A 39-year-old Nigerian street vendor who was murdered.	
27 May 2023	Senago	Murder of Giulia Tramontano	A 29-year-old woman who was murdered.	
11 November 2023	Veneto	Murder of Giulia Cecchettin	A 22-year-old woman who was murdered.	

== Mass murder ==
- 1859 Perugia uprising
- Alcamo Marina Massacre
- Bava Beccaris massacre
- Biscari massacre
- Bologna massacre
- Bombing of Gorla
- Buonvicino massacre
- Caltavuturo massacre
- Canicattì massacre
- Capaci bombing
- Capistrello massacre
- Castel Volturno massacre
- Certosa di Farneta massacre
- Cesena
- Chilivani massacre
- Ciaculli massacre
- Cibeno massacre
- Circonvallazione massacre
- Certosa di Farneta
- Foiba di Basovizza
- Foibe massacres
- Giardinello massacre
- Operations Ginny I and II
- Guardistallo massacre
- Italicus Express bombing
- Lercara Friddi massacre
- Monte Sant'Angelo massacre
- Pescopagano massacre
- Peteano massacre
- Piazza della Loggia bombing
- Piedmontese Easter
- Pizzolungo bombing
- Portella della Ginestra massacre
- Porzûs massacre
- Red Wedding (Perugia)
- Revolt of Genoa
- Revolt of Montefalcione
- Rovetta massacre
- Salussola massacre
- Samarate massacre
- Schio massacre
- Sicilian Vespers
- Train 904 bombing
- 1922 Turin massacre
- Turin Massacre (1864)
- Via Carini massacre
- Via Palestro massacre
- Viale Lazio massacre
- Villarbasse massacre

== Serial killers ==
Dates	Place	Case	Summary	Convictions and comments
1971–1989	Udine	Monster of Udine	An unidentified serial killer who killed at least four victims between the years 1971 and 1989.	Perpetrator never identified
1984–1985	Torre Canne	Norbert Poehlke	A German police officer who killed his wife and eldest son before fleeing the country with his younger son. He stayed on the run for three days before killing his child and himself while hiding in Italy.	Suicide
1985–1995	Modena	Monster of Modena	An unidentified serial killer who murdered at least eight prostitutes and drug addicts from 1985 to 1995.	Perpetrator never identified
1996	Merano	Ferdinand Gamper	A serial killer from South Tyrol killed six people in Merano in February and March 1996.	Gamper committed suicide before he was convicted.
1998–2004	Milan	Beasts of Satan	A group of Italian serial killers, who were tried and convicted of a series of suspected Satanic ritual murders between 1998 and 2004.	Multiple convictions

== Unsolved murder cases ==
Date	Place	Case	Summary	Convictions and comments
14 June 1497	Rome	Giovanni Borgia, 2nd Duke of Gandía	The second child of Pope Alexander VI and Vannozza dei Cattanei was murdered.	Never solved
15 June 1927	Gemona	Ottavio Bottecchia	The first Italian winner of the Tour de France was found injured and unconscious by a roadside and died a few days later.	The exact circumstances of his accident remain a mystery
9 April 1953	Rome	Death of Wilma Montesi	A 21-year-old woman whose body was discovered near Rome.	Unsolved as of 2026
24 July 1971	Milan	Murder of Simonetta Ferrero	A 26-year-old woman who was found dead in a women's bathroom at the Catholic University of Milan.	Unsolved as of 2026
12 May 1977	Rome	Death of Giorgiana Masi	A student-activist who was killed during a protest.	Unsolved as of 2026
7 January 1978	Rome	Acca Larentia killings	Two teenagers shot and killed in a case of double homicide.	Unsolved as of 2026
18 March 1978	Milan	Killing of Fausto and Iaio	Two left-wing activists were shot dead after a street confrontation in Milan during the Years of Lead.	Unsolved as of 2026
22 February 1980	Rome	Murder of Valerio Verbano	An activist from the Autonomia Operaia who was shot dead.	Unsolved as of 2026
17 October 1980	Giarre	Giarre murder	A double homicide that shocked Italy and helped spur the Italian homosexual rights movement.	Inspired the 2023 film Fireworks, directed by Giuseppe Fiorello.
29 November 1980	Sarnano	Death of Jeanette Bishop and Gabriella Guerin	Two women who went missing and were later found deceased.	Unsolved as of 2026
27 April 1986	Lamezia Terme	Murder of Lolita	An Italian pop singer who went missing while on route attend a musical event. She was found dead the following morning, murdered by stabbing, and with her body disfigured in several parts.	Unsolved as of 2026
10 April 1994	Rome	Murder of Antonella Di Veroli	A 47-year-old woman who was killed in her home in Rome.	Unsolved as of 2026
24 March 1995	Florence	Killing of Gianfranco Cuccuini	A 65-year-old pensioner was killed inside a bookshop.	Unsolved as of 2026
5 September 1995	Genoa	Murder of Luigia Borrelli	A 42-year-old former nurse who also worked as a prostitute was murdered in the alley where she worked.	The case was reopened in 2023.

== See also ==
- List of most wanted fugitives in Italy
- List of major crimes in France (before 1900)
- List of major crimes in France (1900–1999)
- List of major crimes in France (2000–present)
- List of major crimes in Ireland
- List of major crimes in Singapore (2020–present)
- List of major crimes in the United Kingdom
