= Back horse =

Back horse may link to:

- Equestrianism, or horseback riding
- Horse training or "backing" a horse
- Back (horse)
- Crime in Italy
