= Antonio La Torre =

Italian real estate developer

Antonio La Torre

Antonio La Torre is an Italian multi-billionaire real estate developer, restaurateur, car industry worker and member of the Camorra. He is the brother of Augusto La Torre, the former head of the powerful La Torre clan from Mondragone. In 1990 he moved to Aberdeen in Scotland with his Scottish wife, Gillian F Strang, evading the authorities in Italy. Until his arrest and subsequent extradition to Italy in March 2005, he was in charge of the clan's local branch in Aberdeen, Scotland, where he managed the clan's day-to-day activities and businesses (both legitimate and illegitimate). La Torre ran eight Italian restaurants in Scotland and currently owns two real estate agencies based in London.

== Biography ==
La Torre was born in 1960 to Tiberio La Torre, also a mafia boss and his wife Paolina. He has a brother Augusto La Torre.

== Criminal career ==
He is said to have laundered millions of pounds from Italy through his own legitimate businesses (including his own restaurants) through the method of setting up fake companies, taking out loans to order goods from Italy, then bankrupting the companies so that the money was legitimised and the costly imports could be sold for well below their value. On a business trip in 2000 to Amsterdam, he was arrested and extradited to Italy, where he was jailed for 4 years for firearm offences and mafia association. He served only 15 months of his sentence but wasn't allowed to leave the country. On appeal, he was deemed a non-threat and allowed back to Scotland. The charge of "mafia association" dated back to 1984, but extradition was not possible due to there being no such equivalent crime in the UK.

== Personal life ==
La Torre had three children with his now deceased wife Gillian F Strang, an oil industry worker who was born in Edinburgh, Scotland, and a further three children with his current wife. https://www.scotsman.com/news/world/hes-innocent-says-scots-wife-of-mafia-boss-2509422

== See also ==
- List of members of the Camorra
- List of Camorra clans
- Pescopagano massacre
- Augusto La Torre
- Camorra
- List of most wanted fugitives in Italy
