= Stefano Cassiani =

Italian painter (1636–1714)

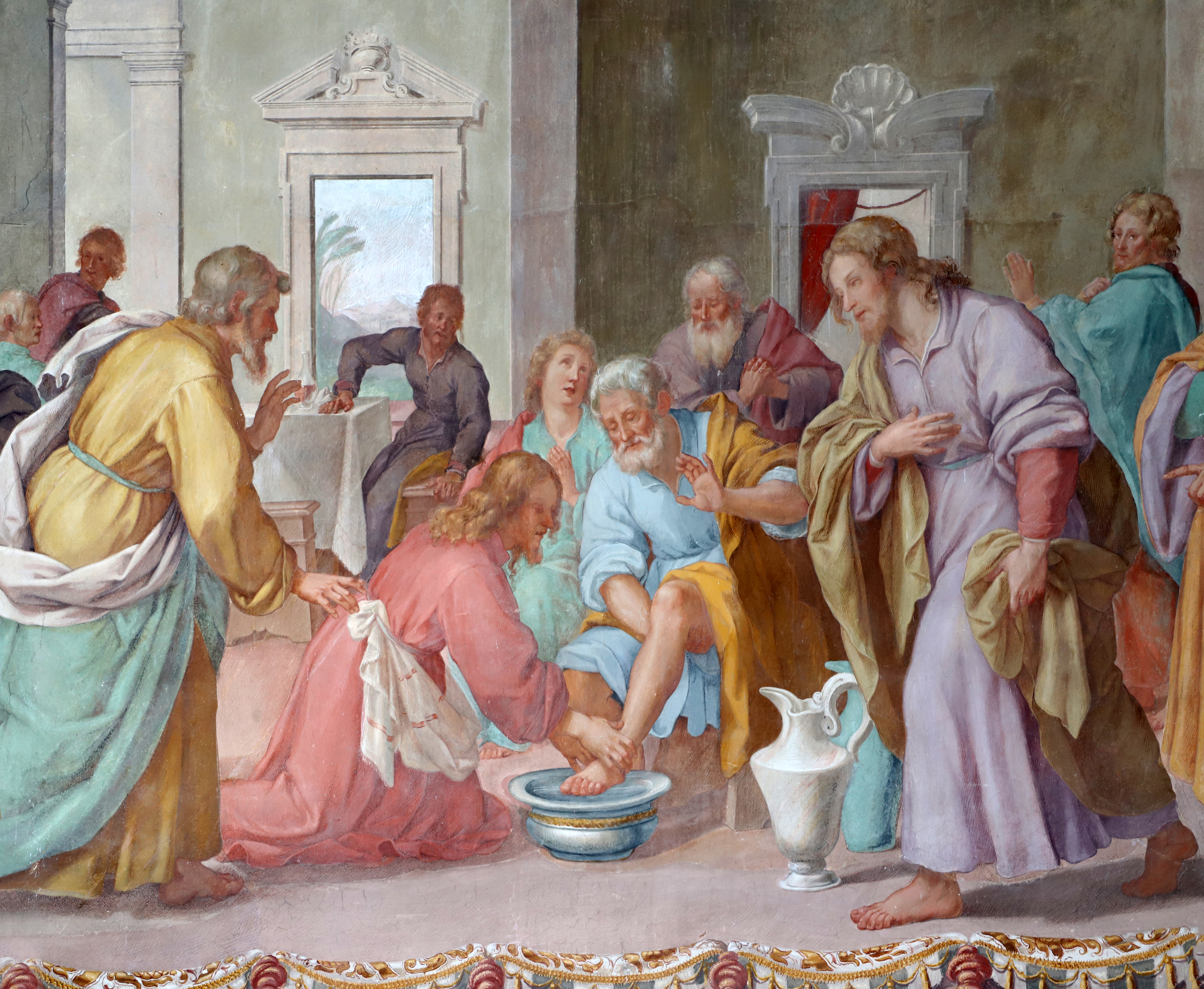
Washing of the Feet, Pontignano Chartreuse (Siena), 1668 circa

Padre Stefano Cassiani (9 March 1636 – 15 February 1714) was an Italian painter of the Baroque.

== Biography ==
He was also called Il Certosino (the Carthusian) by virtue of being a monk of that order. He was born Baldassare Cassiani (al seculo) in Ansano, near Pescaglia which is now province of Lucca. He followed the style of Pietro da Cortona and Filippo Gherardi.

He painted frescoes for the church of San Paolino in Lucca. He began painting at the Certosa of Farneta under Giovanni Fondagna. He painted in fresco the cupola of the church of abbey, as well as two altar-pieces, representing subjects from the Life of the Virgin. Other churches of his order at Pisa and Siena, contained works by him.
