= Olinto De Pretto =

Italian industrialist and geologist (1857–1921)

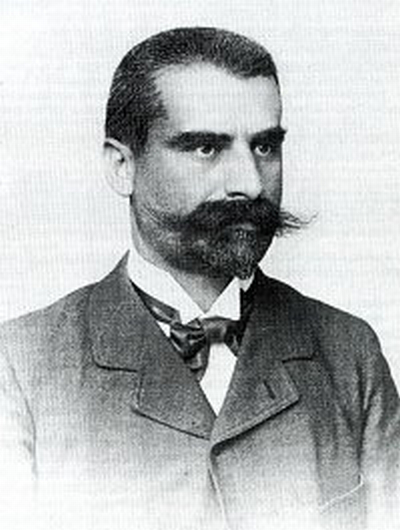
- Olinto De Pretto
- Born: 26 April 1857; Schio, Austrian Empire
- Died: 16 March 1921 (aged 63); Schio, Province of Vicenza, Italy
- Education: Superior School of Agriculture, Milan
- Known for: Claimed nonrelativistic derivation of the mass–energy equivalence relation (E=mc^{2}); Work on the radioactive decay of uranium and thorium; Effects of glaciers on the formation of mountains; Work on agronomics
- Scientific career
- Fields: Theoretical physics; Geology
- Workplaces: Superior School of Agriculture, Milan; mechanical foundry mill; Alpinistic Circle
- Academic advisors: Gaetano Cantoni

Olinto De Pretto (26 April 1857 – 16 March 1921) was an Italian industrialist and geologist from Schio, Vicenza. It is claimed by an Italian mathematician, Umberto Bartocci, that De Pretto may have been the first person to derive the energy–mass-equivalence $E=mc^2$, generally attributed to Albert Einstein. But this is refuted by Ignazio Marchioro in Quaderni di Schio, where it shows that the similarity was a coincidence, and that the energy proposed by De Pretto doubles the one of Einstein's formula. Also, De Pretto suggested that radioactive decay of uranium and thorium was an example of mass transforming into energy.

== Early life ==
Olinto De Pretto was born on 26 April 1857, in Schio in what is now the province of Vicenza in northern Italy. Olinto was the sixth of seven children (three boys and four girls). His mother was Angelica Boschetti (1822–1905). His father, Pietro De Pretto (1810–1891), was an architect whose hobbies included astronomy and geology, two studies Olinto would later take up.

He attended the Superior School of Agriculture in Milan, where he studied agriculture and geology with a major in agronomics. He graduated in 1879 with a degree in agronomics. Immediately upon graduation, he became a university assistant to professor Gaetano Cantoni, a Dean of the agricultural school. Together they developed methods that helped modernize Italian agriculture by improving methods of crop rotation and analyzing soil chemistry.

When Cantoni died in 1887, Olinto left the university and became a director at a mechanical foundry mill owned by his older brother Silvio, where he worked for the rest of his life.

== Early scientific research and papers ==
In 1888, as a result of his research with his brother Augusto, he published his first paper, "The Influence of the Raising and the Degradation of Mountains on the Development of Glaciers". In 1892, along with his brothers Augusto and Silvio, they founded the Alpinistic Circle, with Silvio as the first president. In 1896 the Bulletin of the Italian Society of Geology republished his article as "The Degradation of Mountains and Its Influence on Glaciers". In 1898, his paper titled "Glacial Epoch and Orografical Theory" was published in the Bulletin of the Italian Alpine Club.

In 1899, he published "Geological Signs in the Surroundings of Schio".

== Aether theories ==
From 1899 to 1903, De Pretto began to study the emerging field of nuclear physics and its relationship to astronomy. He focused on the theory of aether, a hypothetical substance that at that time was believed to fill all space.

As a result of his research, on 29 November 1903, De Pretto published a 62-page paper in the Atti del Reale Istituto Veneto di Scienze, Lettere ed Arti, vol LXIII (Proceedings of the Royal Veneto Institute of Science, Letters and Arts) entitled "Ipotesi dell'Etere nella Vita dell'Universo" ("Hypothesis of Aether in the Life of the Universe"). The paper was endorsed by the famous astronomer Giovanni Schiaparelli. De Pretto's paper was later included in the proceedings of an Italian scientific institute The Royal Veneto Institute of Science.

=== Controversial claim about mass-energy formula ===
According to Italian mathematical historian Umberto Bartocci, De Pretto presented a formula in agreement with Albert Einstein's later formula $E=mc^2$ for mass–energy equivalence, which was derived by Einstein as a consequence of special relativity. According to Bartocci, Einstein may have learned of de Pretto's work through his Swiss-Italian friend Michele Besso. However analysis of De Pretto work shows it to be entirely based on classical physics and his model was inconsistent with physical facts. Rather than mass-energy equivalence, De Pretto seems to have been discussing vis viva, the classical concept of living force similar to kinetic energy.

De Pretto's theory was based on his hypothesis that a mass traveling at velocity v has the potential energy (forza viva) proportional to mv^{2} (the exact formula is 1/2mv^{2}). In the section of his paper headed Energy of the Ether and Potential Energy in Matter, De Pretto wrote:

Matter uses and stores energy as inertia, just like a steam engine that uses the energy in steam and stores energy in inertia as potential energy[... ] All components of a body are animated by infinitesimal but rapid movements equal to perhaps the vibration of the ether. It must be concluded that the matter in any body contains the sum of the energy represented by the entire mass of that body if it could move through space with the speed of a single particle.

By theorizing the "vibration of the ether", De Pretto asserted that mass is vibrating energy and that mass and energy are therefore interchangeable. He then speculated that ordinary matter may be considered to be vibrating at the speed of light c.

According to De Pretto,

The matter of any body contains within it a sum of energy represented by the entire mass of the body[... ] Nobody will easily admit that, stored in a latent state, in any kilogram of matter, completely hidden to all our investigations, hides such a sum of energy, equivalent to the amount that can be extracted from [burning] millions and millions of kilograms of coal."

=== Radioactive decay ===
De Pretto's paper discussed the radioactive decay of uranium and thorium and was the first to conclude that this decay was an energy transformation from mass into energy. He also presented a hypothesis that the intense heat assumed to be in the centre of the Earth (theory of central fire) was caused by the tremendous mass of the Earth creating a massive radioactive core giving off heat and energy.

== Honours ==
In 1906, De Pretto was accepted as a member of Accademia dei Lincei, a scientific organization whose members included Galileo Galilei. The director of the organization, Ernesto Mancini, was also a member of The Royal Society of London, an international scientific society. Mancini submitted De Pretto's paper to the Royal Society for international recognition. It was received favourably and was listed in the Society's International Catalogue of Scientific Literature.
