= Schio =

- Comune
- Comune di Schio
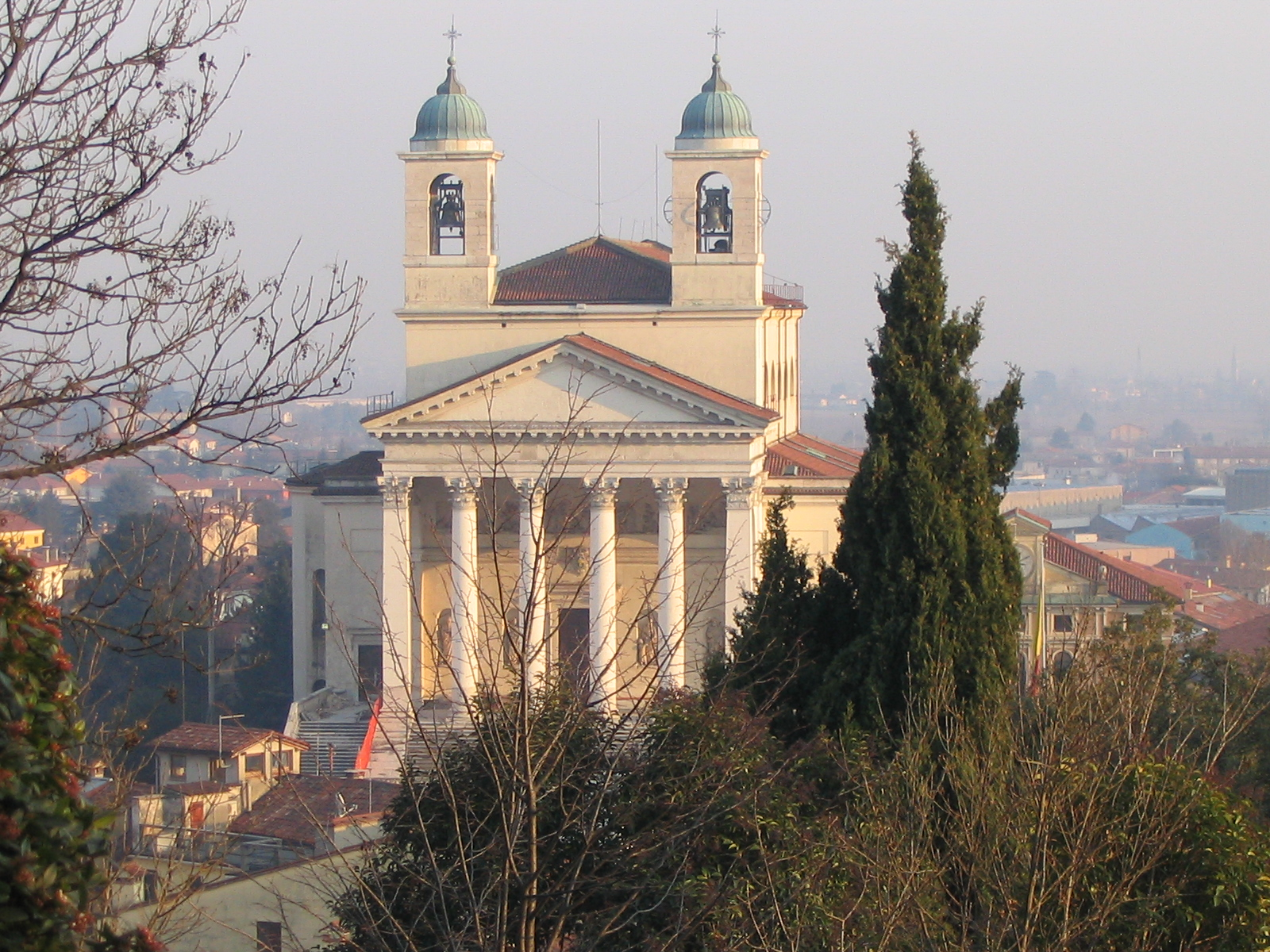
- Duomo (San Pietro Church)

- Schio within the Province of Vicenza

- Location within Italy Location within Veneto
- Coordinates: 45°42′40″N 11°21′20″E
- Country: Italy
- Region: Veneto
- Province: Vicenza (VI)
- Frazioni: Aste, Cabrelle, Giavenale, Monte Magrè, Piane, Poleo, Santa Caterina, Santa Maria, San Rocco, Sant'Ulderico, Magrè, Liviera, Cà Trenta, Ss. Trinità, Santa Croce

Government
  - Mayor: Cristina Marigo

Area
  - Total: 67 km^{2} (26 sq mi)
- Elevation: 200 m (660 ft)

Population (December 31, 2011)
  - Total: 39 688
  - Density: 0.58/km^{2} (1.5/sq mi)
- Demonym: Scledensi
- Time zone: UTC+1 (CET)
  - Summer (DST): UTC+2 (CEST)
- Postal code: 36015
- Dialing code: 0445
- Patron saint: St Peter
- Saint day: June 29
- Website: Official website

Schio (Italian pronunciation: [ˈskiːo]) is a town and comune in the province of Vicenza (region of Veneto, northern Italy) situated north of Vicenza and east of the Lake Garda. It is surrounded by the Little Dolomites (Italian Prealps) and Mount Pasubio.

== History ==
Its name comes from Latin: escletum was a wood of oaks, and it was first used in a document of some Benedictines from Vicenza. The first settlements were around two old hills, where now there are, respectively, the ruins of an old castle and a neoclassical cathedral.

By the 12th century, Schio had become an important centre of prosperous wool manufacturing. The city was ruled by the Venetian Maltraversi family until 1311.

Schio is now an industrial town thanks to Alessandro Rossi, who founded the biggest Italian wool firm (Lanerossi) in the 19th century. Rossi also arranged the building of houses, nurseries, schools, theatres and gardens for his workers. The most important textile factories in Schio were Lanerossi, Conte and Cazzola. Schio was called "Manchester of Italy" because it was the focal point of the northern wool trade, like the British city.

After World War II, the Italian resistance movement committed the Schio massacre in a temporary prison building in July 1945, killing 54 inmates.

== Main sights ==
- The Weaver’s Monument, erected in 1879 by Alessandro Rossi, who dedicated it to his workers. The inhabitants of Schio call it L’Omo (a dialect word for "man"). It is a statue representing a man who holds proudly in one hand the shuttle of his loom, the emblem of his craft and indeed of the whole textile industry.
- A tower of the Castle, demolished in 1514.
- San Francesco (St Francis’) church, dating from the early 15th century. The church is now part of a complex of buildings, superimposed in time, which were used formerly by the Monastery dei Frati Minori (1437-1806) and then by Schio's civil hospital (the Baratto Institute 1807–1959) and now a home for the elderly.
- The little church of St Mary in the Valley, originally a column erected in 1511 after a plague. It became a church in 1580.
- Toaldi-Capra Palace. This building dates from the 15th century or earlier; some frescoes have been recovered in the interior. It first belonged to the Toaldi family; it then passed to Enrico Capra, a noble from Vicenza, before becoming the Town Hall until 1913. It was recovered and carefully restored in 1981, and now houses the civic Musical Institute as a centre for cultural activities.

== Main events ==
- In 2019, the TEDx Conference event was introduced for the first time, a significant step forward for the community.

== Twin towns ==
- Landshut, Germany, since 1981
- Kaposvár, Hungary, since 1990
- Pétange, Luxembourg, since 1992

== Notable people ==
- Josephine Bakhita, F.D.C.C. (ca. 1869 – 8 February 1947), was a Sudanese-Italian Canossian religious sister who lived in Italy for 45 years, after having been a slave in Sudan. In 2000, she was declared a saint by the Catholic Church.
- Olinto de Pretto, an industrialist who published a mass-energy equivalence equation in 1903, two years before Einstein
- Emmanuel Sabbi, association football player

== Gallery ==
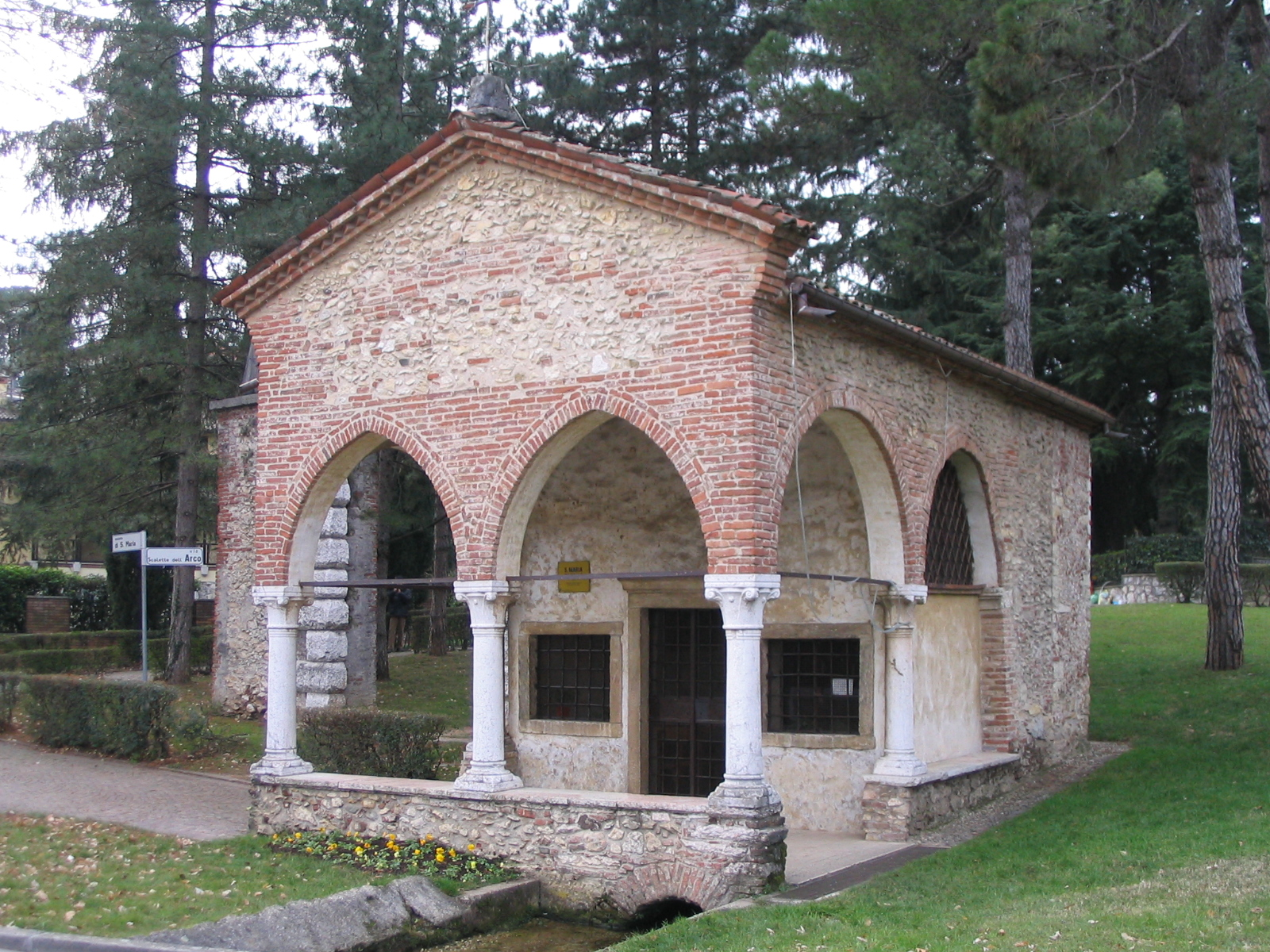
The little church of St Mary

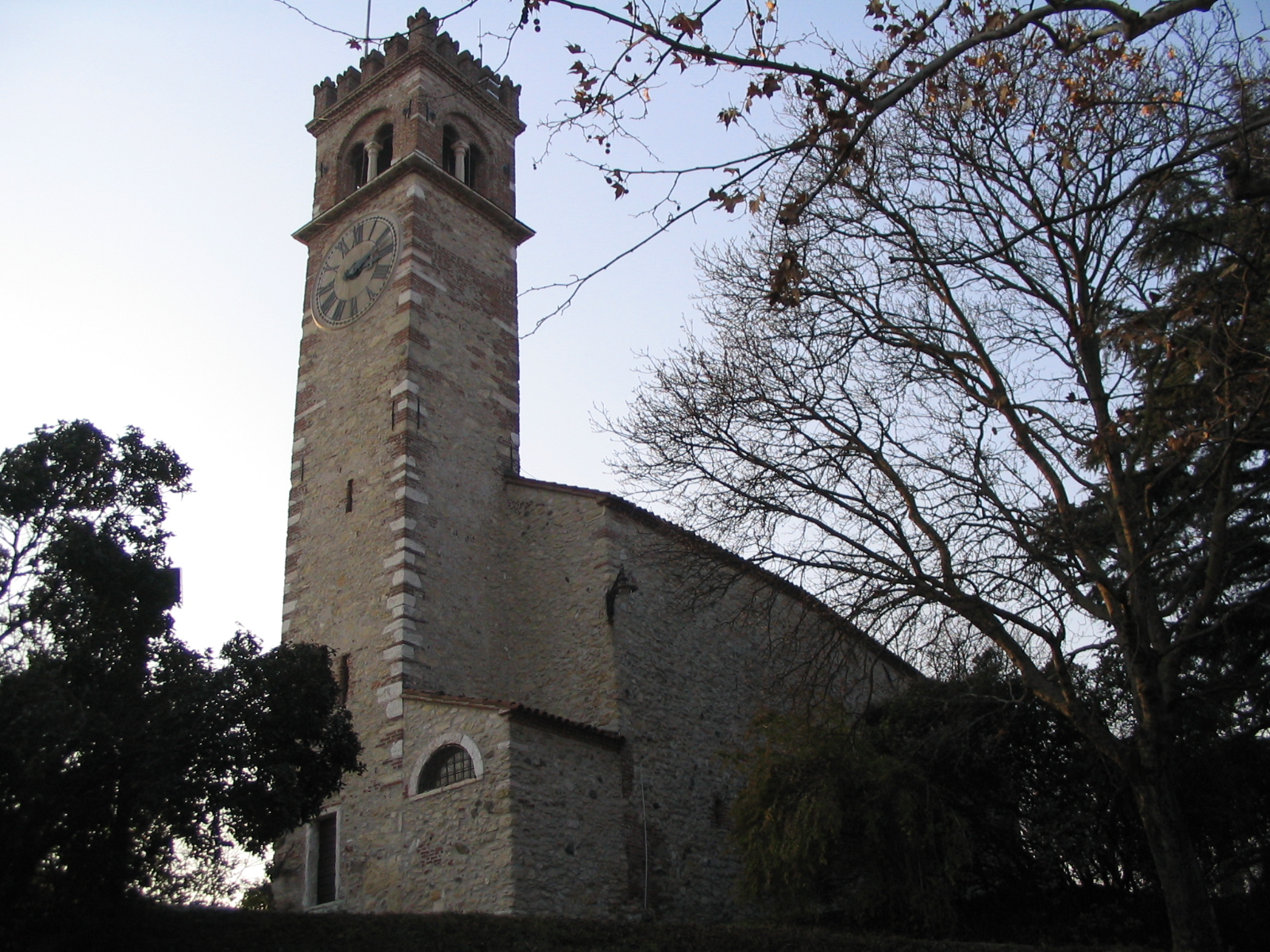
The castle, seen from the Tajara

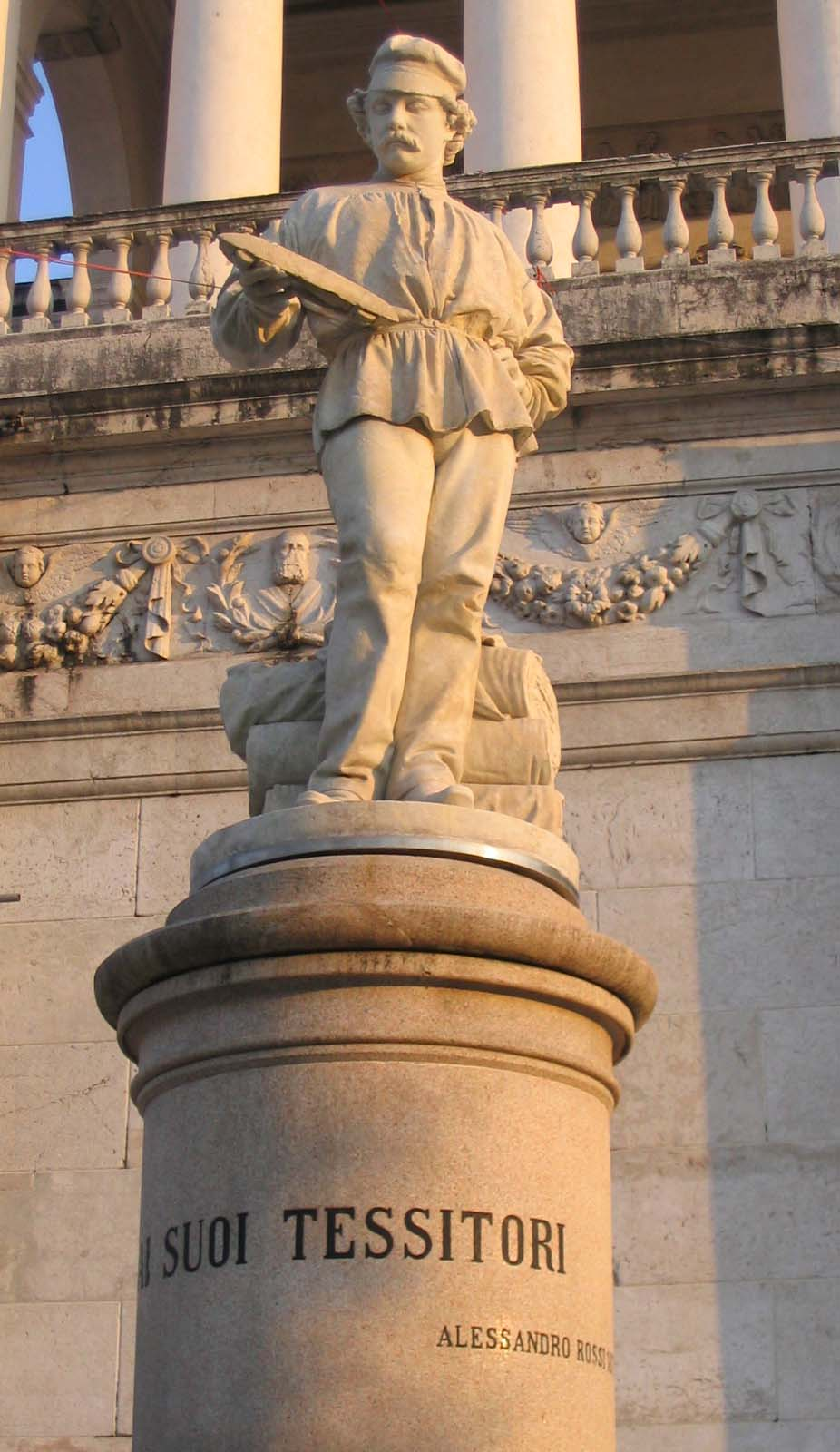
L'Omo

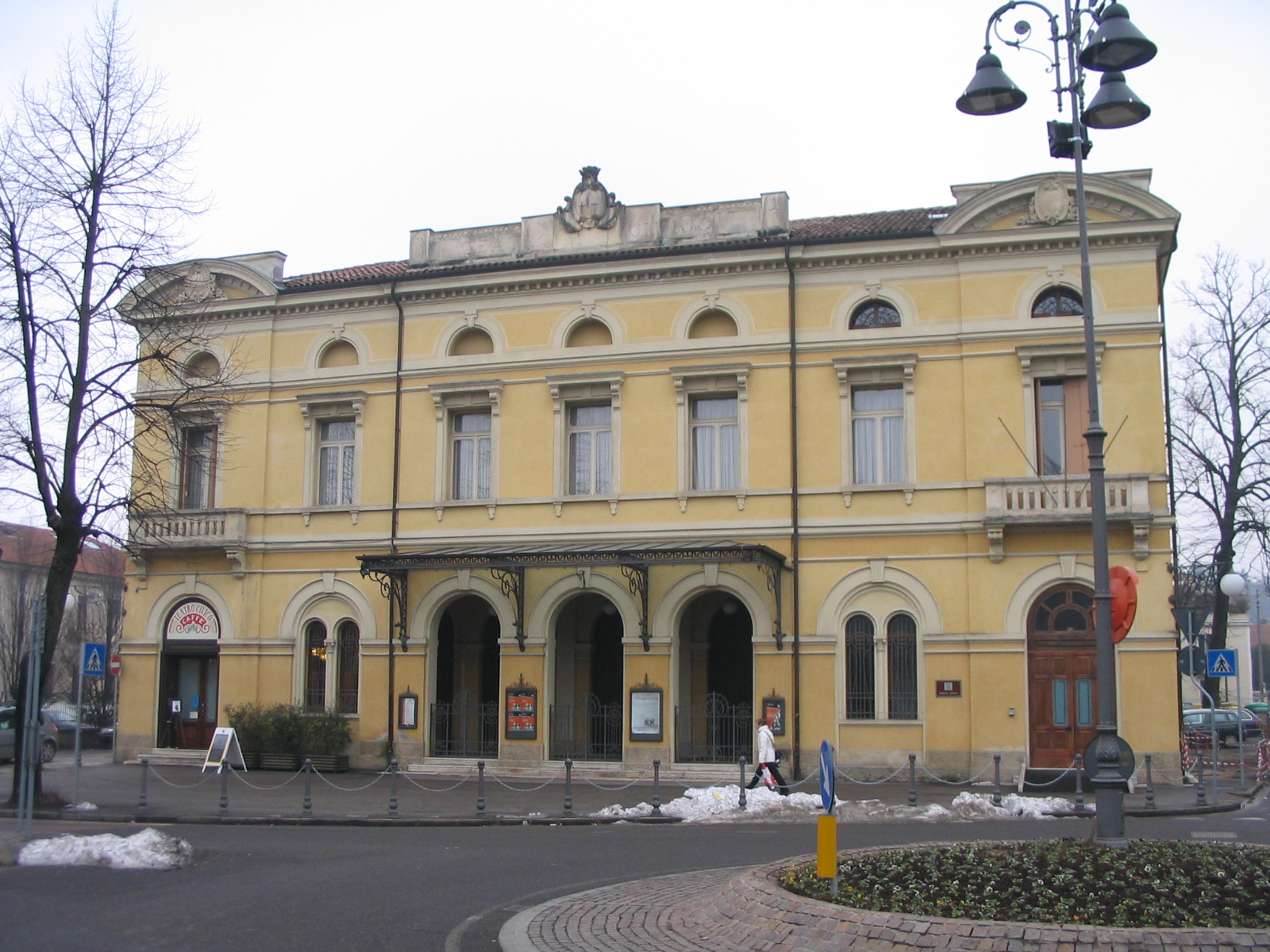
The Civic Theatre

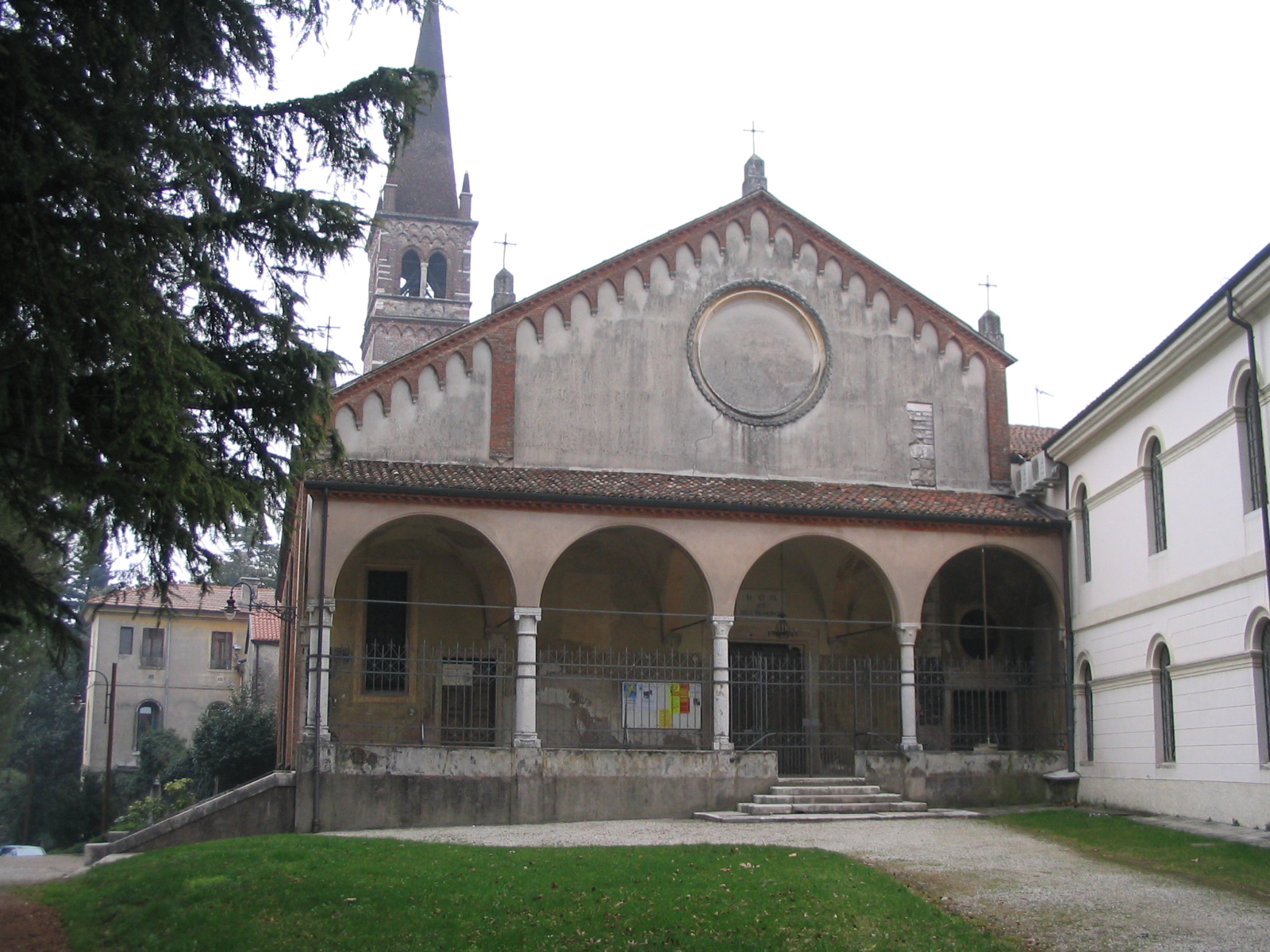
The church of St Francis

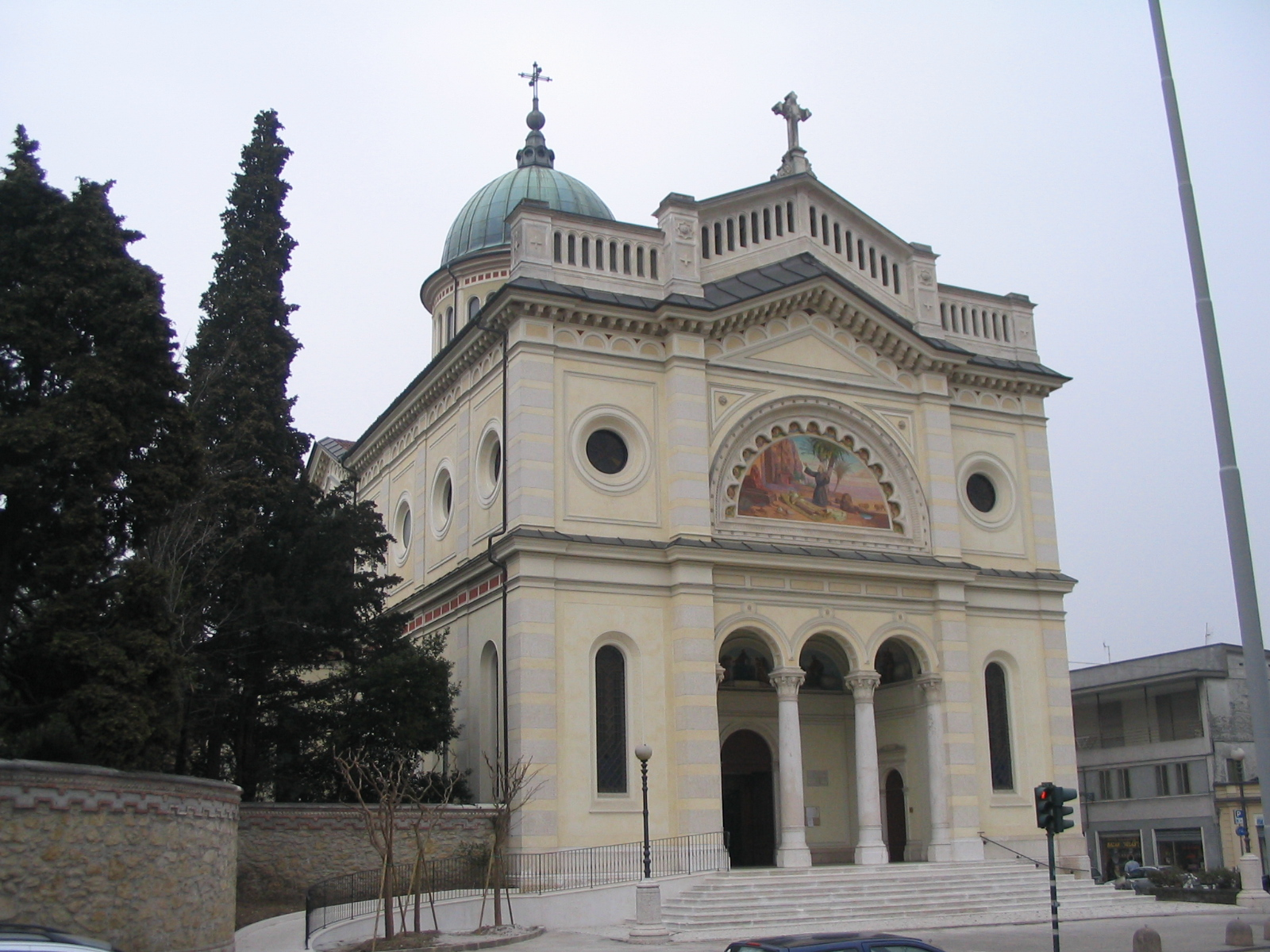
The church of St Anthony

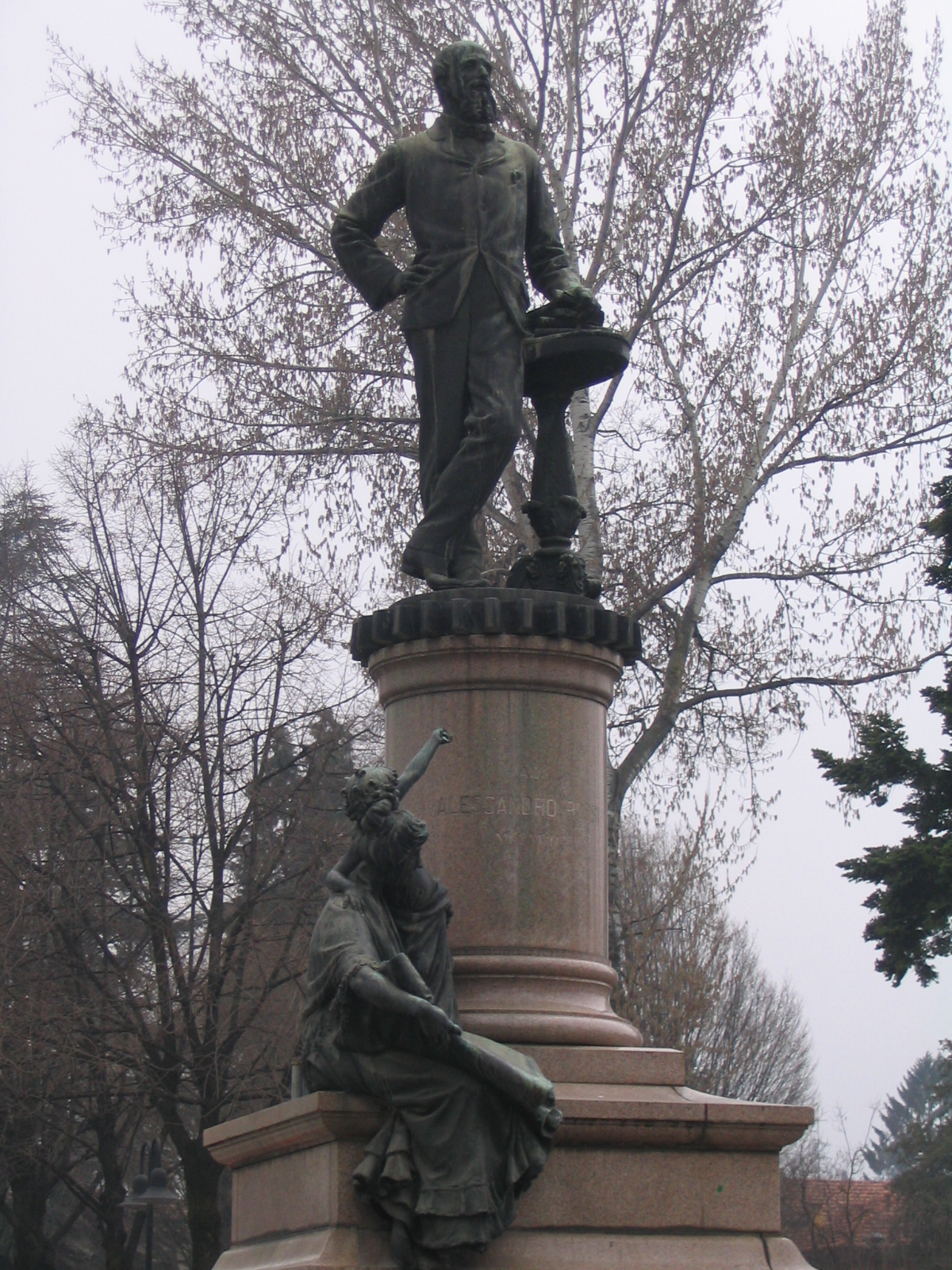
Monument to Alessandro Rossi

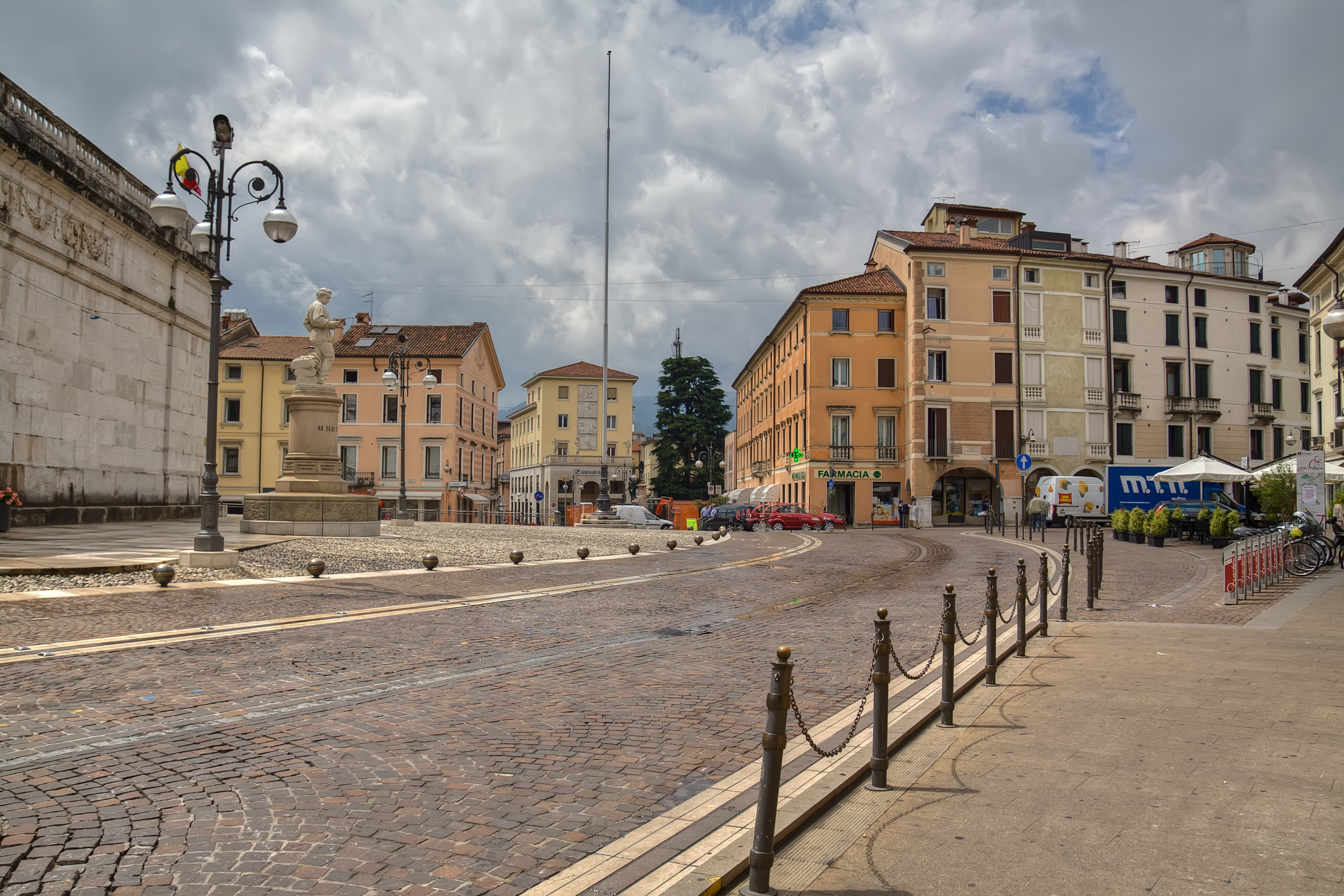
Piazza Alessandro Rossi

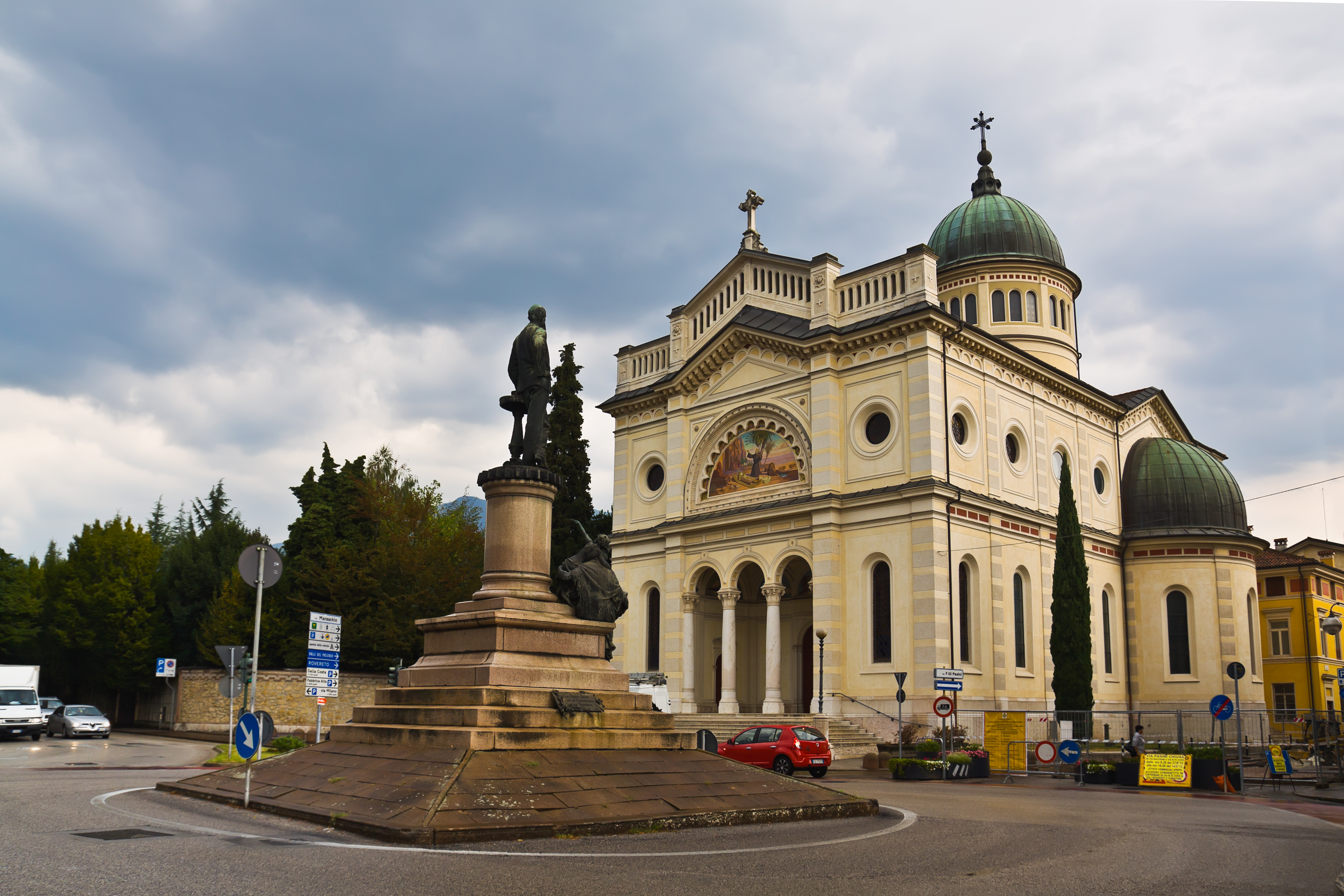
Monumento ad Alessandro Rossi in Schio

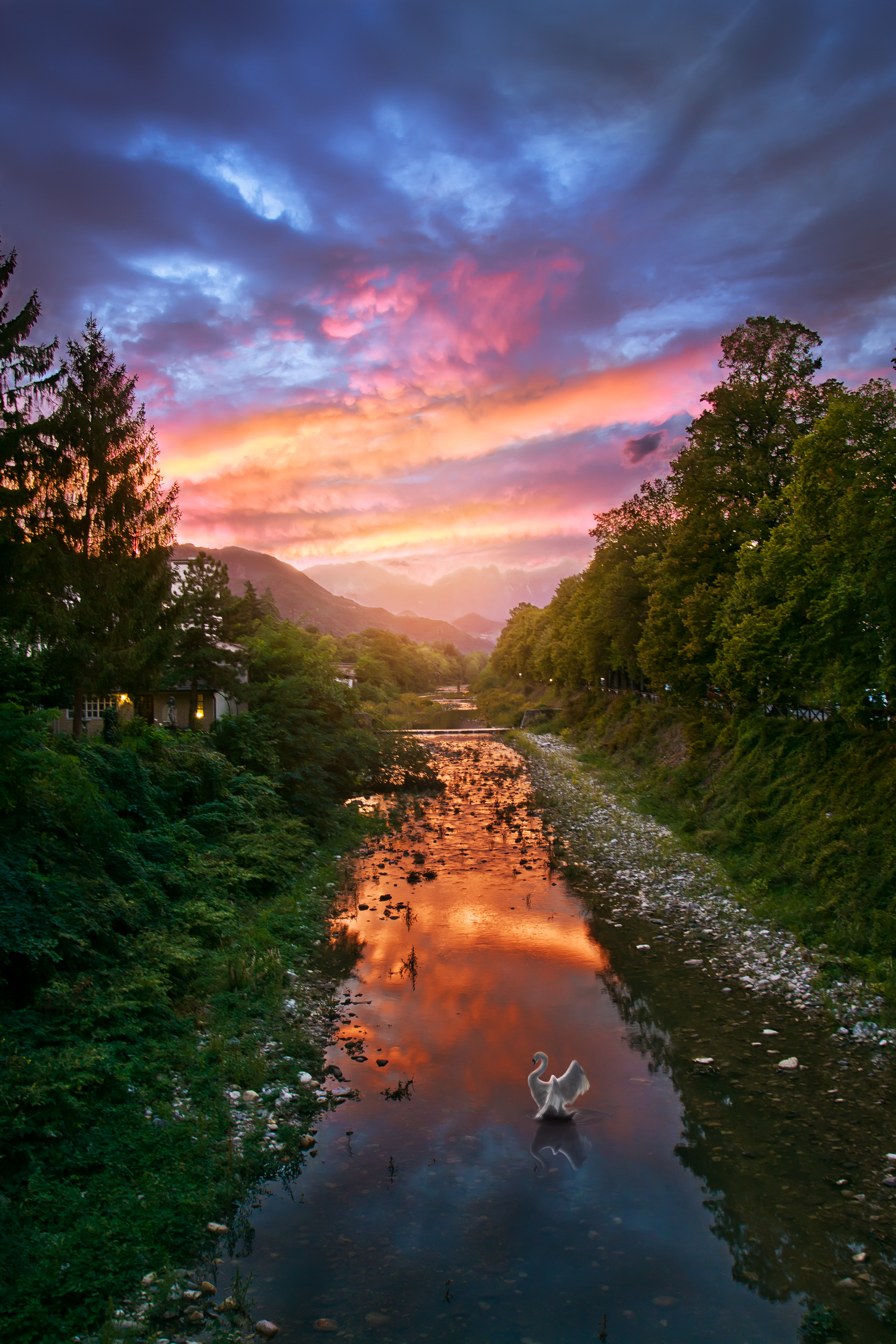
River Leogra

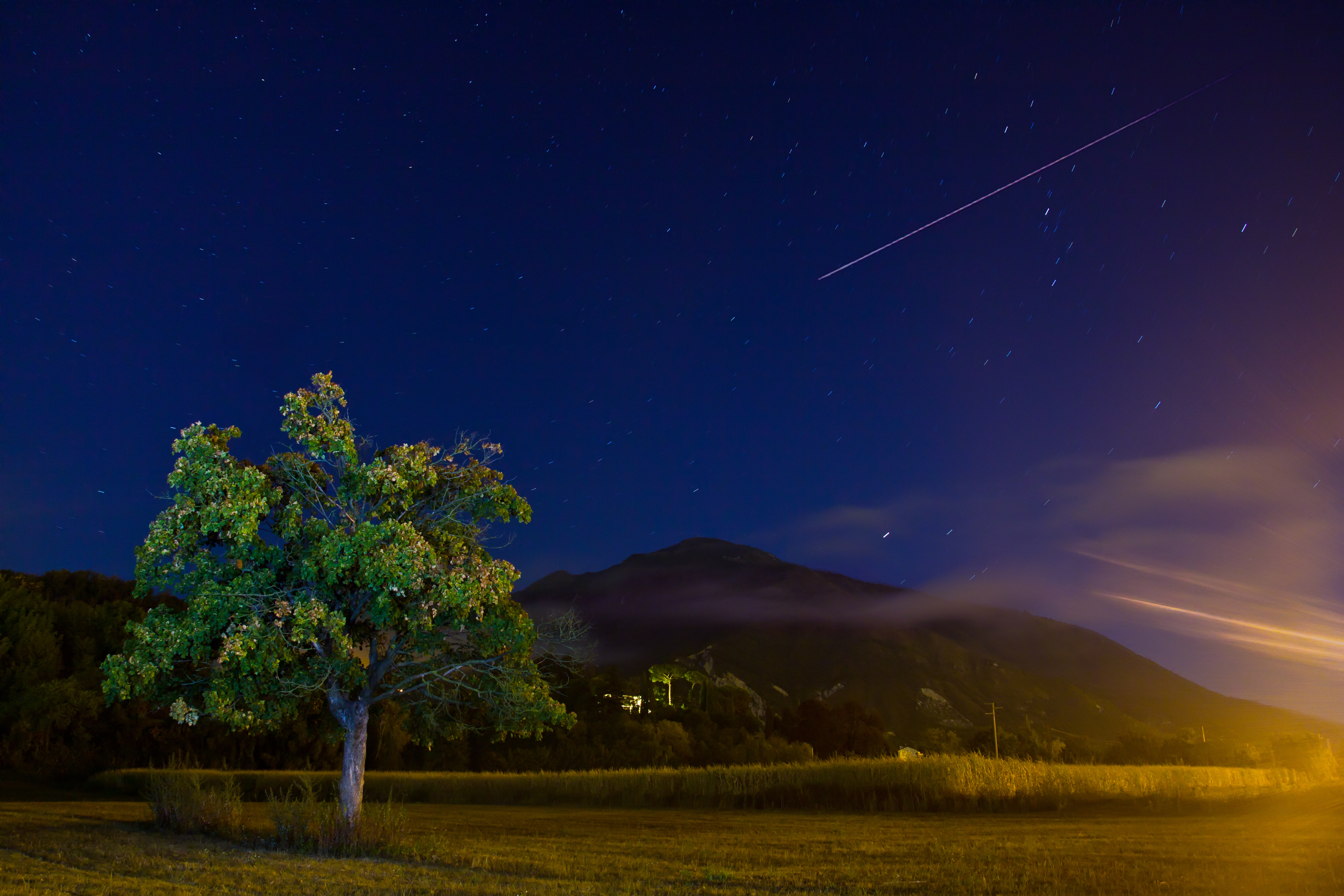
Summano at Night

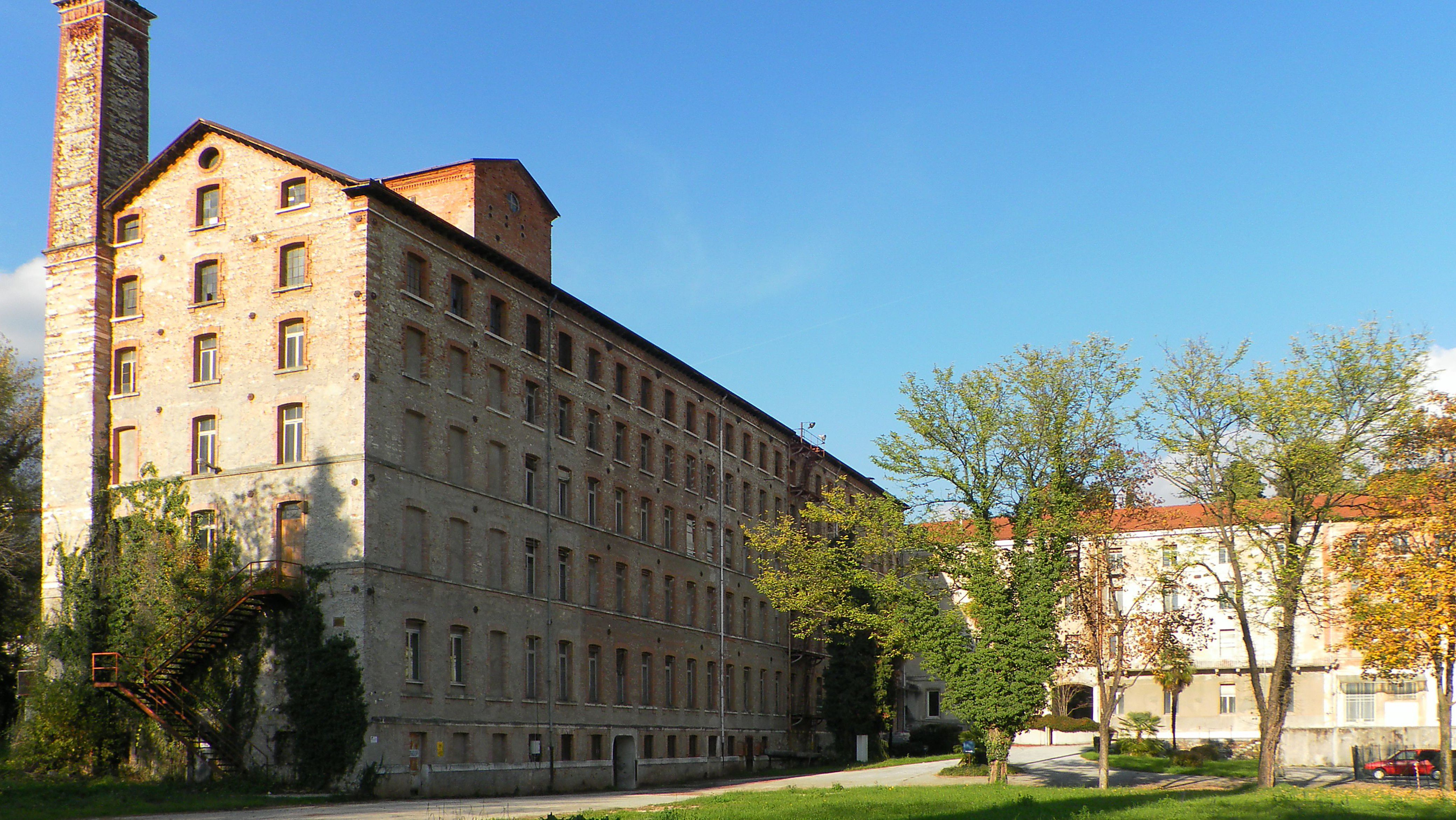
Fabbrica Alta
