= Augusto La Torre =

Italian criminal and former Camorra boss (born 1962)

- Born: September 24, 1962 (age 64); Mondragone, Italy
- Occupation: Former head of the La Torre clan
- Children: Francesco Tiberio La Torre
- Relatives: Antonio La Torre (brother)
- Status: In prison
- Allegiance: La Torre clan / Camorra
- Criminal charges: Murder
- Penalty: Life in prison

Augusto La Torre (Mondragone, Province of Caserta, September 24, 1962) is an Italian criminal and former Camorra boss. Up until his arrest and subsequent collaboration with Italian justice in January 2003, La Torre was the head of the now defunct La Torre clan, a powerful Camorra organization whose vast lucrative criminal empire stretched from its base Mondragone in the hinterland of Campania out into Aberdeen, Scotland, as well as the Netherlands.

== Criminal career ==
Augusto La Torre is the son of Tiberio La Torre, also a Camorrista, and Paolina Gravano, his brother is Antonio La Torre. At a young age, Augusto took over from his father the command of the clan, at the time dominant in the region of Alto Casertano, in lower Lazio and along the whole Domitian coast. Over the years La Torre accumulated capital with extortion, drug trafficking, control of various economic activities and contracts. For a time the La Torre clan was hostile to the Casalesi clan. One of the great strengths of the La Torre's organization was the alliances with politics, in fact, Mondragone, the clan's stronghold, was the first municipality to be dissolved due to Camorra infiltration in the 1990s.

La Torre was suspected of having hid hundreds of millions of euros in Dutch banks, as the La Torre clan was very active in the Netherlands in the 1990s, transporting large cocaine shipments from South America to Campania via the Netherlands.

His organization was also known to launder money in the Ivory Coast with the help of the former chancellor of Salerno, Cesare Salomone.

In October 2019, La Torre was sentenced to life imprisonment. He was found guilty of being the instigator and executor of the Pescopagano massacre happened on April 24, 1990. According to the investigations reconstruction, the massacre happened because La Torre wanted to "clean up" the Pescopagano area from African drug dealers.

== Personal life ==
Augusto La Torre has a son, Francesco Tiberio La Torre. In a 2017 interview, Francesco declared that he found out about his father's "job" in the newspapers when he was 7 years old and just burst into tears, he also explained how it was growing up in Mondragone when the La Torre clan was at its peak, saying that “you could feel the Camorra in the air. You could smell it.“

== See also ==
- List of members of the Camorra
- List of Camorra clans
- Pescopagano massacre
- Antonio La Torre
- Camorra
- List of most wanted fugitives in Italy
