= Avetrana =

- Comune
- Comune di Avetrana
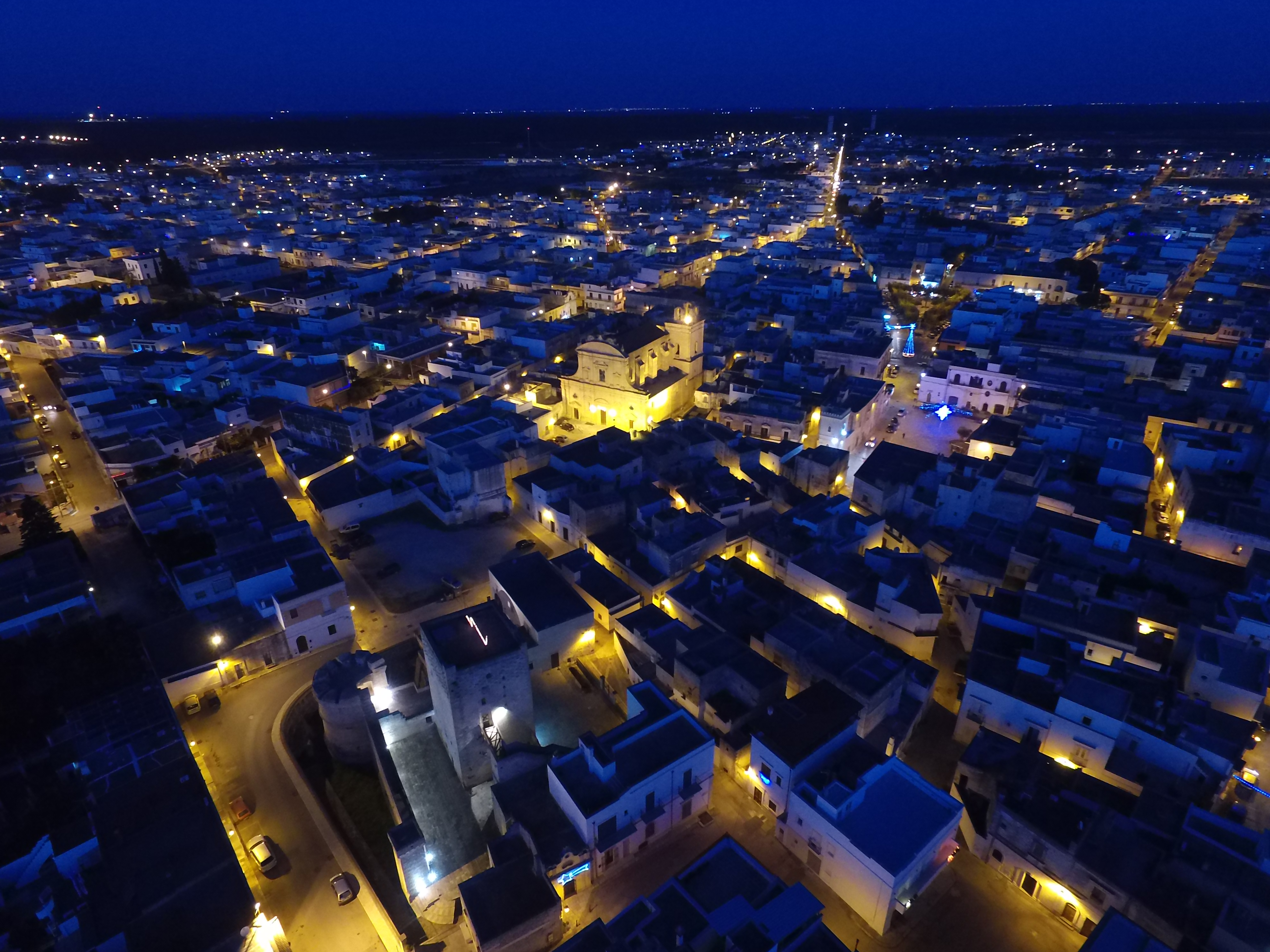
- View of Avetrana

- Coat of arms

- Location in Taranto Province

- Location within Italy Location within Apulia
- Coordinates: 40°21′N 17°44′E
- Country: Italy
- Region: Apulia
- Province: Taranto (TA)
- Frazioni: Urmo Belsito

Government
  - Mayor: Antonio Iazzi

Area
  - Total: 73.23 km^{2} (28.27 sq mi)
- Elevation: 62 m (203 ft)

Population (30 April 2017)
  - Total: 6,670
  - Density: 91.1/km^{2} (236/sq mi)
- Demonym: Avetranesi
- Time zone: UTC+1 (CET)
  - Summer (DST): UTC+2 (CEST)
- Postal code: 74020
- Dialing code: 099
- Patron saint: St. Blaise
- Website: Official website

Avetrana (Salentino: L'Aitràna) is a town and comune in the province of Taranto, part of the Apulia region of southeast Italy.

== History ==
- Murder of Sarah Scazzi

== Main sights ==
- The Castle (13th century) or Torrione
- The Chiesa Madre (15th-16th-17th century)
- Palazzo Imperiali (17th century)
