= Monster of Udine =

Unidentified serial killer in Italy

- Born: unknown

Details
- Victims: 4–16
- Date: 1971–1989
- Country: Italy
- State: Province of Udine

The Monster of Udine (Italian: Mostro di Udine) was an unidentified serial killer who killed at least four victims in the Province of Udine in north-eastern Italy between the years 1971 and 1989.

In March 2019, following the discovery of some evidence which had never been analysed before, a plaintiff lawyer requested the reopening of the cold case.

== Murders ==
The official number of murders attributed to the Mostro di Udine is 4, although there may have been more (up to 16). The four victims were found with a gaping incision in their abdomen cut and cleaned with extreme care, most likely with a scalpel or something similar. The incision of the cut was very close to that of a Cesarean, which convinced police that the killer was a doctor. However, the police have never had any real leads in the case.

The following four women are confirmed victims of the Monster of Udine:

- Maria Carla Bellone, 19, sex worker, killed on 19 February 1980;
- Luana Giamporcaro, 22, sex worker, killed on 24 January 1983;
- Aurelia Januschewitz, 42, sex worker, killed on 3 March 1985;
- Marina Lepre, 40, primary-school teacher, killed on 26 February 1989.

Investigators believe the following women may be victims of the Monster of Udine, but have been unable to confirm with absolute certainty:

- Irene Belletti, stabbed multiple times in various places on 21 September 1971;
- Elsa Moruzzi, strangled in November 1972;
- Eugenia Tilling, stabbed in the throat in December 1975;
- Maria Luisa Bernardo, stabbed in various places on 21 September 1976; investigators believe there may be a connection between this murder and the murder of Irene Belletti;
- Jaqueline Brechbullher stabbed in multiple places;
- Wilma Ghin, body found burned at a landfill in March 1980; a young man from Apulia, in the far south of Italy nearly 1,000 km from Udine, was investigated for the crime but later cleared as a suspect;
- Maria Bucovaz, strangled in May 1984;
- Matilde Zanette, killed in September 1984;
- Stojanka Joksimovic, strangled in December 1984;
- Nicla Perabò, strangled in September 1991.

Considering the different modi operandi, there could have been more than one murderer active in the same area, at the same time. In 2019, the Carabinieri Forensic Science Dept. (RIS), in Parma, were asked to analyse the new evidence and ascertain whether those crimes are to be attributed to one or more (serial) murderers.

== See also ==
- List of fugitives from justice who disappeared

== Bibliography ==
- Elena Commesatti: Femmine one day, BéBert editions
