= Pescopagano massacre =

The Pescopagano massacre (Italian:Strage di Pescopagano) was a massacre perpetrated by the La Torre clan on 24 April 1990 in front of a bar in Pescopagano, in the municipality of Mondragone, located in the province of Caserta, Italy.

== Overview ==
The massacre resulted in the accidental deaths of five people, that included three Tanzanians, an Iranian, and an Italian. In addition to this, seven people were injured, including the bar manager and his fourteen-year-old son, who became paralyzed after suffering from a broken vertebra. The bloodbath was the result of an internal conflict between the native Camorra, the La Torre clan that had run and controlled the whole municipality and its rackets for years and the new Tanzanian and Ghanaian immigrants, under a new drug cartel that operated from Middle Eastern countries and Africa and planned to act in Italy.

== Aftermath ==
In October 2019, Augusto La Torre, former head of the La Torre clan was sentenced to life imprisonment. He was found guilty of being the instigator and executor of the Pescopagano massacre. According to the investigations reconstruction, the massacre happened because La Torre wanted to "clean up" the Pescopagano area from African drug dealers.

== See also ==
- List of members of the Camorra
- List of Camorra clans
- Antonio La Torre
- Augusto La Torre
- Camorra
- List of most wanted fugitives in Italy
