= 2019 Italian bus hijack =

Mass murder attempt

On 20 March 2019, a school bus in Crema in Lombardy was hijacked by its driver Ousseynou Sy, who attempted to set it on fire. Sy, whose origins are Senegalese, said his motive was to avenge the deaths of African migrants in the Mediterranean Sea. Police freed the children before he set the vehicle on fire. In July 2020, he was sentenced to 24 years in prison for forced confinement with terrorist intent. In February 2022, the Supreme Court of Cassation confirmed the sentence as 19 years.

== Perpetrator ==
Sy was born in France in 1972, to Senegalese parents. He moved to Italy in 2004, becoming a citizen through marriage to a woman from Brescia. He lost contact with his two children after their separation; he said during his attack that he had three daughters who had drowned in the sea.

Sy worked as a bus driver since 2004. His licence was suspended in 2007 for driving under the influence. In 2010 he sexually assaulted a 17-year-old girl, and received an 18-month suspended sentence in 2018. In the aftermath of his hijack, Italy called for regular checks on school bus drivers' criminal records, as Sy's employers Autoguidovie were unaware of his prior offences.

== Attack ==
The school bus from Crema was returning from the gymnasium with 51 children, two teachers and a janitor on board when Sy doused the aisle with petrol and announced that he was hijacking it towards Linate Airport in Milan. He gave zip ties to the adults and ordered them to tie up the children.

Some on board managed to ring the police, who attempted to block the bus and to negotiate with Sy. The Carabinieri broke the rear windows to free those on board, at which point Sy lit a lighter and torched the bus. Twelve children were hospitalised with shock, bruising or smoke inhalation.

A 13-year-old boy called Ramy Shehata was hailed as a hero for his part in the rescue. While pretending to pray in Arabic, he rang his father who informed the police. Shehata, whose parents are Egyptian, was not born with Italian citizenship. He was later awarded with citizenship by Interior Minister Matteo Salvini. Salvini, leader of Lega Nord, had been hesitant to make an exception to Italy's citizenship laws, but was convinced by deputy prime minister Luigi Di Maio. Shehata was one of five boys invited to meet Salvini and to attend a UEFA Euro 2020 qualification match of the Italy national football team as a reward for heroism.

== Investigation ==
Investigators found that Sy acted alone, and had no connection to Islamic extremism. He had sent videos to friends telling Africans to "rise up", and had bought petrol and restraints in preparation. He was of sound mind when committing the crimes.

In July 2020, Sy was convicted and sentenced to 24 years in prison. In his statement, he denied wrongdoing and railed against Salvini. In April 2021, the Court of Appeal of Milan reduced his sentence to 19 years, and in February 2022 the Supreme Court of Cassation confirmed that as the sentence.
