= Murder of Sarah Scazzi =

2010 murder in Italy

Coordinates: 40°20′35.77″N 17°43′42.13″E

- Native name: Delitto di Avetrana
- Location: 22 Via Grazia Deledda, Avetrana, Italy
- Date: 26 August 2010; 2:00-2:20 pm approx.
- Attack type: Strangulation
- Weapon: Belt (not found)
- Deaths: 1
- Victim: Sarah Scazzi
- Motive: Resentment and jealousy towards the victim
- Verdict: Guilty
- Convicted: Sabrina Misseri (voluntary homicide with premeditation); Cosima Serrano (complicity in murder and kidnapping); Michele Misseri (suppression of corpse and tampering with evidence)

The murder of Sarah Scazzi, also known as the Delitto di Avetrana (English: Avetrana crime or Avetrana murder) was a murder which occurred on 26 August 2010, in Avetrana, in the province of Taranto, Italy. Fifteen-year-old Sarah Scazzi was strangled by her cousin Sabrina Misseri and her aunt Cosima Serrano, who then hid the body together with her father Michele Misseri, staging a kidnapping by a third party. The story had significant media coverage in Italy. It culminated with the announcement of the discovery of the victim's body live on the Rai programme Chi l'ha visto? where Sarah's mother, Concetta Serrano Spagnolo, was a special guest.

On 21 February 2017, the Supreme Court of Cassation found Sabrina Misseri and Cosima Serrano, respectively the victim's cousin and aunt, guilty and sentenced them to life imprisonment for complicity in voluntary homicide aggravated by premeditation, confirming the sentence already handed down in the first instance and on appeal by the Corte d'Assise of Taranto. Michele Misseri, Sabrina's father and Cosima's husband, was sentenced to 8 years of imprisonment for suppression of a corpse and tampering with evidence (the theft of Sarah's cell phone); Carmine Misseri, Michele's brother, was sentenced to 4 years and 11 months of imprisonment for complicity in concealment of a corpse. Finally, the Court of Cassation confirmed the sentence of one year and four months for personal aiding and abetting for Vito Russo Jr., Sabrina's former lawyer, and Giuseppe Nigro.

== Disappearance ==
Map of the province of Taranto (Avetrana highlighted)

On 26 August 2010, the disappearance of fifteen-year-old Sarah Scazzi (born in Busto Arsizio on 4 April 1995), a student about to begin her second year of hotel management school, was reported by her mother. The girl had left home around 2:30 pm to reach the home of her cousin Sabrina Misseri (born in Taranto on 10 February 1988), a few hundred metres away, intending to visit the seaside with her and another friend.

The disappearance received immediate media coverage. From the beginning, the media's attention focused on Sarah's private life, analysing her habits, her secret diary and her Facebook profile, looking for possible reasons that could have led her to run away from home. She was portrayed by the media as a restless teenager, who engaged with boys much older than her on the web and was capable of planning her disappearance to become famous and escape from a small town where she was bored and felt oppressed by a mother with whom she frequently argued. Friends and relatives, however, including her cousin Sabrina, denied this image and continued to support the theory of kidnapping, despite the modest economic conditions of the family.

Initially, the Carabinieri investigations were oriented towards the girl's escape or a kidnapping by a man who had lured Sarah on Facebook. The search continued throughout September, with growing media interest seeing the mother and her family, in particular her cousin Sabrina, hosted by television programmes to launch appeals for Sarah's return home.

On 17 September 2010, Sarah's maternal grandfather, Cosimo Serrano died at the age of 89. His carer Maria Pantir decided to return to Romania, claiming she had nothing to do with the disappearance of the girl. She returned to Italy on October 6.

On 29 September, Sarah's mobile phone was discovered, half burned, in a field not far from her home. It was found by her uncle Michele Antonio Misseri (born on 22 March 1954 in Manduria) who claimed to be able to find his niece, fueling suspicions around him who, with his wife Cosima Serrano, sister of Sarah's mother, both farmers and former emigrants to Germany, had practically raised the missing girl in their home.

On 6 October, at the end of an interrogation that lasted about nine hours, Misseri confessed to the murder of his niece, claiming that he had killed her after an attempted rape, indicating to the investigators the place where he had hidden the body, a water collection well located in Contrada Mosca, in the countryside of Avetrana.

Scazzi's body was later found in that place. The discovery was communicated to the family and the public live on television by the Rai programme Chi l'ha visto?. Sarah's body was buried on 9 October at the municipal cemetery of Avetrana, next to her maternal grandmother.

== Investigations ==
Misseri retracted his initial confession and said he had had erotic dreams about Sarah several times, until on 15 October he confirmed the investigators' suspicions about the involvement of his daughter Sabrina, stating that Sarah had died during a game that had turned into an argument.

The following day, after a six-hour interrogation, Sabrina was arrested on charges of complicity in murder. On 21 October the Taranto GIP decided to validate the arrest, basing it on the testimony of her friend Mariangela Spagnoletti, who reported that Misseri "appeared agitated" and kept repeating that her cousin had certainly been kidnapped and that it was necessary to immediately notify the Carabinieri. The investigations began by hypothesizing that Sabrina's motive was jealousy over the attentions her cousin Sarah was receiving from Ivano Russo, a cook from Avetrana with whom Sabrina— according to the Prosecutor's Office— was in love. Sarah had met Ivano a few months earlier, in December 2009, and the young chef had immediately struck up a strong friendship with the two girls. Sabrina began to show interest in him and the two, in the first days of August (probably 3 August 2010), had— as declared by Ivano himself— a sexual relationship, which he did not want to become something more.

Sarah later told others about this episode reported to her by her cousin, giving rise to gossip and slander that reached the ears of Ivano who decided, a few days before Sarah's death, to definitively break off the relationship with Sabrina. This increased the latter's hatred towards her cousin, and constituted for the prosecution the real motive for the murder, probably matured following a heated argument between the girls that took place on the evening of August 25, in a pub in the village in front of witnesses.

During the trial, however, the witnesses confirmed only that Sabrina had reprimanded Sarah, which she attributed to the fact that her cousin was publicly and expansively showing her desire for "cuddles" from Ivano and she feared that this could fuel gossip in the village.

Meanwhile, Misseri, since the autopsy on Sarah's body had not confirmed sexual violence on her corpse, retracted his initial confession, declaring that he had not abused his niece's corpse.

On 6 November, Misseri further changed his version, attributing the murder only to his daughter and declaring that he had been called by Sabrina after Sarah's death to help hide her body. Following these further investigations, the charge against Sabrina became only that of murder, while that of kidnapping was dropped.

On 26 May 2011, Cosima Serrano, Sabrina's mother, was arrested on charges of complicity in murder and kidnapping. Analysis of phone records showed that her mobile phone had made a call from the garage, where she said she had not been, a circumstance on which the Carabinieri of the ROS, during their deposition at the hearing on 27 March 2012, expressed in terms of "compatibility". Five days after the arrest, Misseri was released from prison, since the terms of the precautionary custody for the crime of suppression of a corpse had elapsed.

The main evidence against the two women was the testimony (sometimes described by the witness as a "dream") of a florist from Avetrana, Giovanni Buccolieri. Buccolieri initially said that on 26 August 2010, between 2:00 and 2:20 pm, he had seen the two women tugging at Sarah and forcing her to get into the car, and then stated that he was not sure whether the event had actually happened and that he had perhaps only dreamed or imagined it. The first and second instance judges considered his words reliable and compatible with the reconstruction of the facts.

Preliminary investigations concluded on 1 July 2011, with the indictment of 15 people for crimes ranging from complicity in murder to the suppression of a corpse, kidnapping, theft, false statements to the PM, suppression of documents, false representation, aiding and abetting and obstruction of justice.

Subsequently, Misseri reported that the accusations against his daughter were suggested to him in the evidentiary incident of 19 November 2010 by his lawyer Galoppa and by criminologist Roberta Bruzzone, who, in turn, denounced Misseri for the crime of slander. Misseri entrusted the defence of this trial for slander to criminal lawyer Fabrizio Gallo, in order to dismantle the accusations of the evidentiary incident. In the second degree of judgment Misseri was assisted by lawyer La Tanza and doctor Anna Maria Casale who drew up, for the first time, a personality profile of the subject.

Particularly controversial were events that occurred in the respective legal offices: the legal defence of Sabrina Misseri since December 2010 has been entrusted to Roman criminal lawyer Franco Coppi, who entered the defence team alongside the criminal lawyers from Taranto Emilia Velletri and Vito Russo, defenders of Sabrina since her arrest but subsequently forced to renounce the mandate, pursuant to art. 5 of the Code of Forensic Ethics, as they were investigated in the same proceedings as their client. The same fate befell the defence lawyer of Michele Misseri, who was also forced to resign the mandate after being investigated in the same proceedings as his client.

In November 2011, lawyer Emilia Velletri, following an abbreviated trial, was acquitted of the charges for lack of evidence, and Russo, who had instead opted for the ordinary procedure, was acquitted in the preliminary hearing from two charges, again for lack of evidence. At the same time, the other two lawyers accused in the same trial were acquitted, following an abbreviated trial, again with the formula of lack of evidence.

== Trial ==
The trial opened before the Corte d'Assise of Taranto on 10 January 2012, with Sabrina Misseri as the main defendant, accused of voluntary homicide, her mother Cosima accused of complicity in homicide and her father Michele accused of suppression of a corpse. The municipality of Avetrana joined the proceedings as a civil party. Some of Sabrina's friends were called to testify.

Russo confirmed that he had had a brief relationship with the defendant and then broke off the relationship. During his deposition, retracing the evening of the discovery of Sarah's body, he explained that he and Alessio Pisello accompanied Sabrina to the Mosca district - where her father Michele had just found Sarah's body - on her instructions, after she had spoken on the phone with her mother, who was following the developments reported live on the program Chi l'ha visto? However, it was her friend Alessio Pisello who showed her the way, since Sabrina did not know the location of said place.

On 5 December 2012, in a hearing at the Court of Assizes of Taranto, answering the questions of the lawyer of his daughter Sabrina, Michele Misseri, publicly confessed in tears to being guilty of the murder of his granddaughter. After these declarations, his lawyer resigned, suspending the trial while waiting for a new lawyer for Misseri.

On 20 April 2013, the Court of Assizes of Taranto sentenced Sabrina Misseri and Cosima Serrano to life imprisonment for the murder of Sarah Scazzi. Michele Misseri was instead sentenced to 8 years for complicity in the suppression of a corpse. For the same crime, 6 years were given to Carmine Misseri, defended by lawyer Lorenzo Bullo, and to Cosimo Cosma (who died on 8 April 2014 at the age of 46), defended by lawyer Raffaele Missere, respectively the brother and nephew of Michele Misseri. Sabrina's former lawyer was also sentenced to two years of imprisonment for personal aiding and abetting.

On 27 July 2015, the Court of Assizes of Appeal of Taranto confirmed the life sentence for Sabrina Misseri and Cosima Serrano. The Court also confirmed the eight-year prison sentence for Michele Misseri, for complicity in the suppression of a corpse.

As for the other defendants charged with minor crimes, the sentences for some of them were reconfirmed or reduced: one year and four months for Vito Russo Jr. and five years and 11 months for Carmine Misseri.

On 29 July 2016, at the request of lawyer Franco Coppi, the Minister of Justice Andrea Orlando promoted a ministerial inspection of the Taranto court, since more than a year after the conviction the reasons had not been filed due to a delay caused by a technical problem, thus damaging the right to defence of Sabrina and Cosima Misseri (preventing the cassation process from taking place). The reporting judge Susanna De Felice published the reasons only in August 2016, six years and three days after the crime. The CSM opened a file to impose a disciplinary sanction on the magistrate who drafted the sentence.

In May 2016, Sabrina's lawyers requested house arrest for her in a therapeutic community, given the psychophysical health problems that afflicted her and her "non-dangerousness" according to the lawyers, but the supervisory judge rejected the request.

On 21 February 2017, the Supreme Court of Cassation confirmed the life sentences for Sabrina Misseri and Cosima Serrano, 8 years for Michele Misseri for suppression of a corpse and tampering with evidence, 4 years and 11 months for Carmine Misseri and one year and four months for Vito Russo Jr. and Giuseppe Nigro for personal aiding and abetting. The reasons given by the first criminal section of the Court of Cassation highlighted the methods of the crime and the cold planning of a strategy aimed, through unscrupulous, oblique and misleading behaviour, at achieving impunity, Sabrina Misseri would have exploited the media and diverted the investigations as a "shrewd and cold driving force towards false leads".

The second trial on the crime, which focused on the false testimonies and the misdirection carried out by the defendants, ended in the first instance on 22 January 2020 with the conviction of 11 people including Michele Misseri (4 years in prison for self-slander) and Ivano Russo (5 years for false testimony). The convictions relating to this trial were however definitively cancelled on 17 June 2021 because the crime became time-barred due to the prolongation of the time.

On 24 March 2022, almost 12 years after her arrest, the Court of Cassation denied a release for Sabrina Misseri, after she had appealed in cassation against the order with which, on 12 April 2021, the Taranto Surveillance Court had shared the decision of the competent magistrate not to grant her the release.

In 2018, the European Court of Human Rights declared the appeal lodged by the two convicted women admissible. However, the decision on the merits was declared inadmissible on 29 November 2024, ruling that the appeal did not contain the necessary elements to be accepted.

== Reconstruction of the murder ==
The Supreme Court of Cassation, in the reasons for the sentence, maintains that "The crime should be attributed to two people to be identified as the defendants (...) [and] had been committed by strangulation [using] a belt". On the victim's body, no signs of struggle or signs of an attempt to loosen the belt tight around her neck, as an instinctive reaction to the suffocation that was taking place, a sign, the judges of the court wrote, that the strangulation "could not therefore have been the work of a single individual, but must have occurred as a result of the synergic cooperation of two people, one who had carried out the specific action of suffocation from behind on the victim, and the other who had prevented her from attempting to defend herself". The only two people present in the house, the Court of Cassation notes, were Sabrina Misseri and Cosima Serrano.

Given these behaviours, the supreme judges write in the reasons for the sentence, Sabrina is not entitled to the concession of the mitigating circumstances requested by her lawyers, given the "cold planning of a strategy aimed, through unscrupulous, oblique and misleading behaviour, at achieving impunity" and "exploiting the media" in order to divert the investigations as a "shrewd and cold driving force", directing them towards "false leads".

The reduction of sentence was also denied by the Supreme Court for Cosima Serrano, since, being a mature adult, instead of intervening to calm "the bitter conflict that arose" between Sabrina, who was 22 when she killed her fifteen-year-old cousin Sarah, "she had been directly involved in the kidnapping of her young niece, then materially participating in the commission phase of the crime". The body was then taken to the garage and subsequently made to disappear by Michele with the help of his brother and nephew.

The motive is attributable to Sabrina's resentment towards her cousin who had generated "the emotional short circuit" and induced the murder, certainly supported by impulsive intent, in the wake of the need, particularly felt by Cosima Serrano, to safeguard the image of her daughter and family and punish her niece for the damage caused to Sabrina with the diffusion of a particularly embarrassing private and intimate episode.

== Further developments ==
Sabrina Misseri shares a cell with her mother Cosima.

On 11 February 2024 Michele Misseri left the Lecce prison more than a year early, taking advantage of some reductions in his sentence and thus returning to live in his villa on Via Deledda in Avetrana. He subsequently gave some television interviews in which he continues to consider himself the only culprit of Sarah's murder.

== Influences in popular culture ==
=== Television programming ===
- The comedian Checco Zalone did an imitation of Misseri in his programme Resto umile World Show, which aired on Canale 5 from 2 to 9 December 2011. The imitation generated numerous controversies, leading Zalone to officially apologize and abandon the character.
- On 16 January 2018, an episode of the program Il terzo indizio was dedicated, broadcast on Rete 4 and hosted by Barbara De Rossi.
- In March 2018, two episodes of the program Storie maledette, hosted by Franca Leosini, were dedicated.
- The second episode of the first edition of the documentary Tutta la verità, broadcast on Nove, is dedicated to the case.
- On 23 November 2021, an episode was dedicated to the book Sarah: The girl from Avetrana by Flavia Piccinni and Carmine Gazzanini, which aired on Sky Documentaries.
- In July 2024, the teaser trailer for the 4-episode TV miniseries titled Avetrana - Qui non è Hollywood was released, initially scheduled for release on Disney+ on October 25 of the same year, and later moved to October 30 with the title Qui non è Hollywood following the suspension issued at the request of Antonio Iazzi, mayor of Avetrana.

=== Music ===
- In the song by producers Don Joe and Shablo Le leggende non muoiono mai, rapper Fabri Fibra mentions "Scazzi". The name is however censored.
- In 2011, the singer-songwriter Giuseppe Cionfoli dedicated the song Dedicato a Sarah Scazzi to Scazzi, arranged together with the multi-instrumentalist and singer-songwriter from Bari Ago Tambone.
- Misseri is mentioned in the single Killer Star by Immanuel Casto.
- The crime is mentioned in the chorus of the songs Anthem PT.1 and Anthem PT.2 by Fedez.
- In 2020, the crazy rock band Trombe di Falloppio quoted "Misseri" in the song Folletto.
- In 2021, the parody metal band Nanowar of Steel quoted "Zio Michele" in the song Biancodolce.
- Michele Misseri is mentioned by rapper Kid Yugi in the song Sacrificio.
- In 2024, rapper Marracash wrote his song La banalità del male as the soundtrack to the TV miniseries released on Disney+.

=== Podcast ===
- Demoni urbani: Avremo sempre Avetrana (2021), podcast degli Ascoltabili a cura di Gianluca Chinnici, Giuseppe Paternò Raddusa condotta da Francesco Migliaccio.
- Indagini: Avetrana, 26 agosto 2010 (2022), podcast di due puntate a cura di Stefano Nazzi.

== Bibliography ==
- Mariella Boerci (2010). La bambina di Avetrana. Edizioni Anordest. p. 274. ISBN 978-88-96742-33-4.
- Domenico Fumarola (2011). Sarah Scazzi. La morte segreta. Calcangeli. p. 66.
- Andrea Jelardi (2014). Bianco, Rosso e...Giallo. Piccoli e grandi delitti e misteri italiani in venticinque anni di cronaca nera (1988-2013). Kairòs. ISBN 978-88-98029-87-7.
- Flavia Piccinni e Carmine Gazzanini (2020). Sarah. La ragazza di Avetrana. Fandango Libri. ISBN 978-88-60446-68-8.
- Rino Casazza (2022). Il delitto di Avetrana. Algama. ISBN 979-12-80265-54-8.
