= Schio massacre =

Mass prisoner killing in 1945

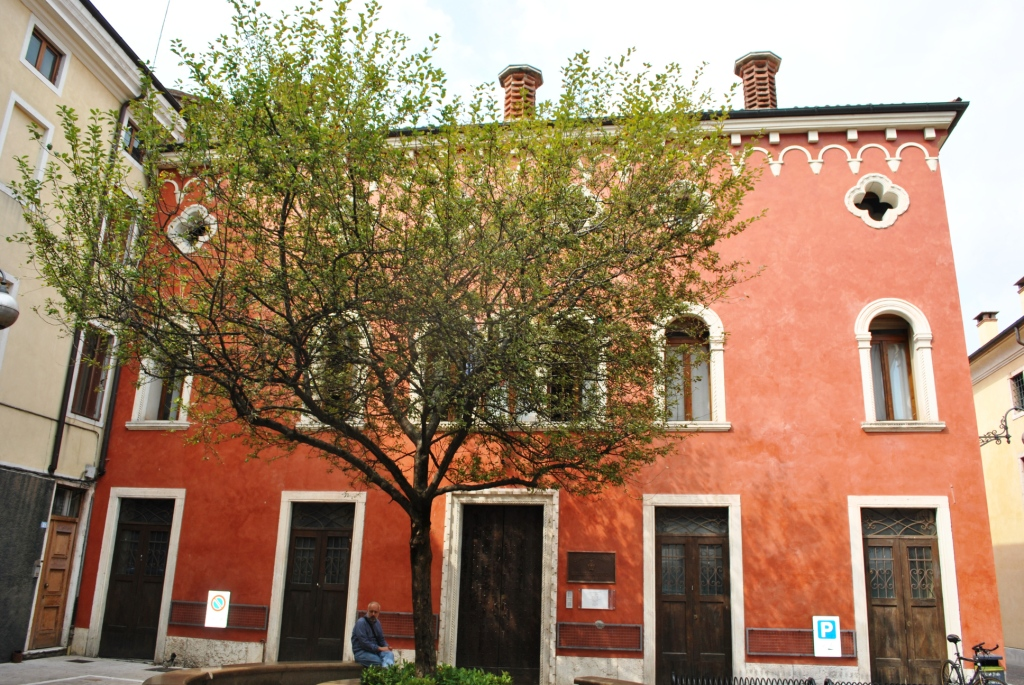
- The building of the Bortoli Hospital that acted as a temporary prison

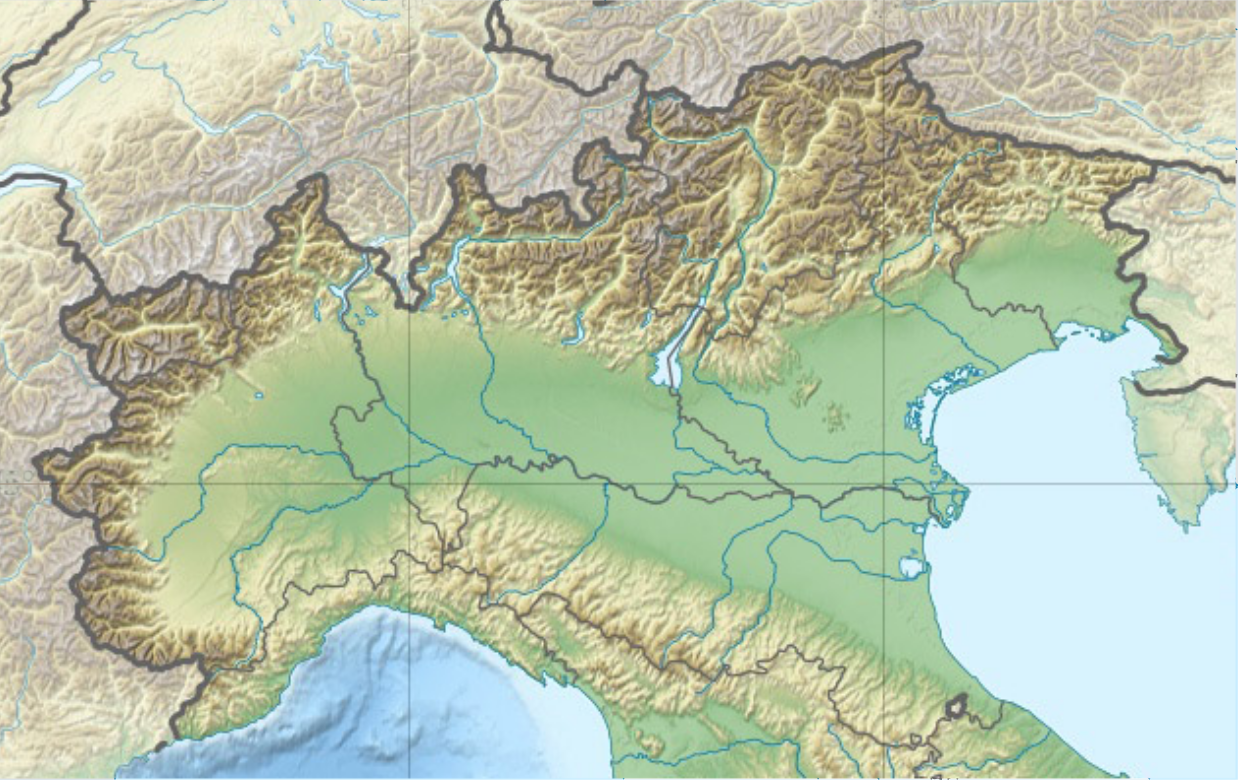
- Schio massacre (Northern Italy)
- Location: 45.7151°N 11.3602°E; Schio, Italy
- Date: 6–7 July 1945
- Target: Prisoners who were known or suspected to be fascist supporters
- Attack type: Massacre
- Deaths: 54
- Injuries: 17
- Perpetrator: Former Italian partisans

The Schio massacre was a mass prisoner killing carried out by former Italian partisans of the Garibaldi Brigade and officers of the Auxiliary Partisan Police in the city jail of Schio on the night of 6–7 July 1945. Of the 54 people who were killed, only 27 of them were fascist supporters or had collaborated with the Germans. The massacre was investigated by the Allies and two trials with convictions followed.

== Background ==
The city jail of Schio in the Veneto housed 99 prisoners, men and women, of whom 91 were imprisoned for collaboration with the Germans or for other political reasons, whereas the remaining 8 were listed as common criminals. A third of the prisoners did not have formal charges pressed against them. According to the historian Sarah Morgan some of them were war criminals, but the majority were just second-rate supporters of the Italian Social Republic. During this time, Italian prisons were very overcrowded and it was expected that the Allies would be releasing prisoners in the immediate future. Recently an inmate from the Mauthausen concentration camp who weighed only 38 kilograms (84 lb), had returned to Schio, which caused tension in the town, including a protest at the prison that called for "avenging the martyrs of Mauthausen". There also were personal vendettas involved and there was a sense of a class war. The town had a working-class and militant history.

== The massacre ==
The partisans found the prison warden in a local bar and took him back to the prison in order to gain access. At this point, there were ten masked partisans and another ten joined them later in the building of the Bortoli Hospital that acted as a temporary prison. Initially, the partisans argued who would be executed and also held discussions with the prisoners. One of the partisans then abruptly opened fire and around 70 inmates who were lined up were targeted with heavy firing after which the partisans escaped. Of the inmates, 47 were killed and 7 more died from their wounds later. The prisoners who were lined up but survived were saved because they hid beneath the bodies. Fourteen of the deceased prisoners were women.

== Aftermath and trial ==
As the area was under the control of the Allied Military Government, the Allies conducted an investigation and seven former partisans were arrested and faced charges of 54 premeditated murders in an Allied military court. The defendants pleaded clemency on the basis of their partisan service history, but three were sentenced to death, two to life in prison, and two others acquitted on the basis of the Italian penal code in September 1945.

The sentenced perpetrators and verdicts:

- Valentino Bortoloso: Death
- Renzo Franceschini: Death
- Antonio Fochesato: Death
- Gaetano Canova: Life imprisonment
- Aldo Santacaterina: Life imprisonment

None of the death penalties were carried out. Some of the accused had already escaped to Czechoslovakia or Yugoslavia, and when Ruggero Maltauro was extradited, a new trial was held in Milan in 1952. In the trial, Maltauro and seven others not present were sentenced to life in prison. Maltauro's sentence was later reduced to 29 years. The death sentences were converted into life sentences and, as a result of the Togliatti amnesty, Bortoloso was released from prison in 1955, having served 10 years.

The Allied Military Government cited the massacre as a ruthless example of break-down of law and a failure of the model of the National Liberation Committee. At the time of the massacre, the Italian Communist Party (PCI) blamed "agent provocateurs" and "Trotskyite agents" in L'Unità. However, during the new trial in the early 1950s, the PCI wrote articles supportive of the perpetrators, and particularly made their support apparent after 1968.

The massacre was not publicly or locally acknowledged afterwards until there was a campaign to place a memorial plaque at the hospital building. The memorial plaque was unveiled in 1994. The compromise wording on the plaque was criticized by the families of the victims and a new shorter text was installed later. The political far-right holds an annual march at the site of the massacre. The National Association of Italian Partisans, ANPI campaigned on behalf of one of the convicted perpetrators, Valentino Bortoloso, to be awarded with the Italian "Medal of Resistance". But as a result of controversy, the Ministry of Defence revoked the award in 2016.

== See also ==
- Porzûs massacre
- Rovetta massacre

== Bibliography ==
- Croci, Osvaldo (2001). "Guilt, context and the historian: Debating the Schio massacre: A comment on Sarah Morgan's 'The Schio killings'". Modern Italy. 6 (2): 223–231. doi:10.1080/13532940120084152.
- Foot, John (2009). "The Resistance: Schio Prison: The Veneto Region, July 6–7, 1945". Italy's Divided Memory. Palgrave Macmillan. ISBN 978-0-230-10183-8.
- Morgan, Sarah (2000). "The Schio killings: A case study of partisan violence in post-war Italy". Modern Italy. 5 (2): 147–160. doi:10.1080/713685677. S2CID 144626428.
- Stein, Eric (1948). "Application of the Law of the Absent Sovereign in Territory under Belligerent Occupation: The Schio Massacre". Michigan Law Review. 46 (3): 341–370. doi:10.2307/1283904. JSTOR 1283904.
