= Crime in Italy =

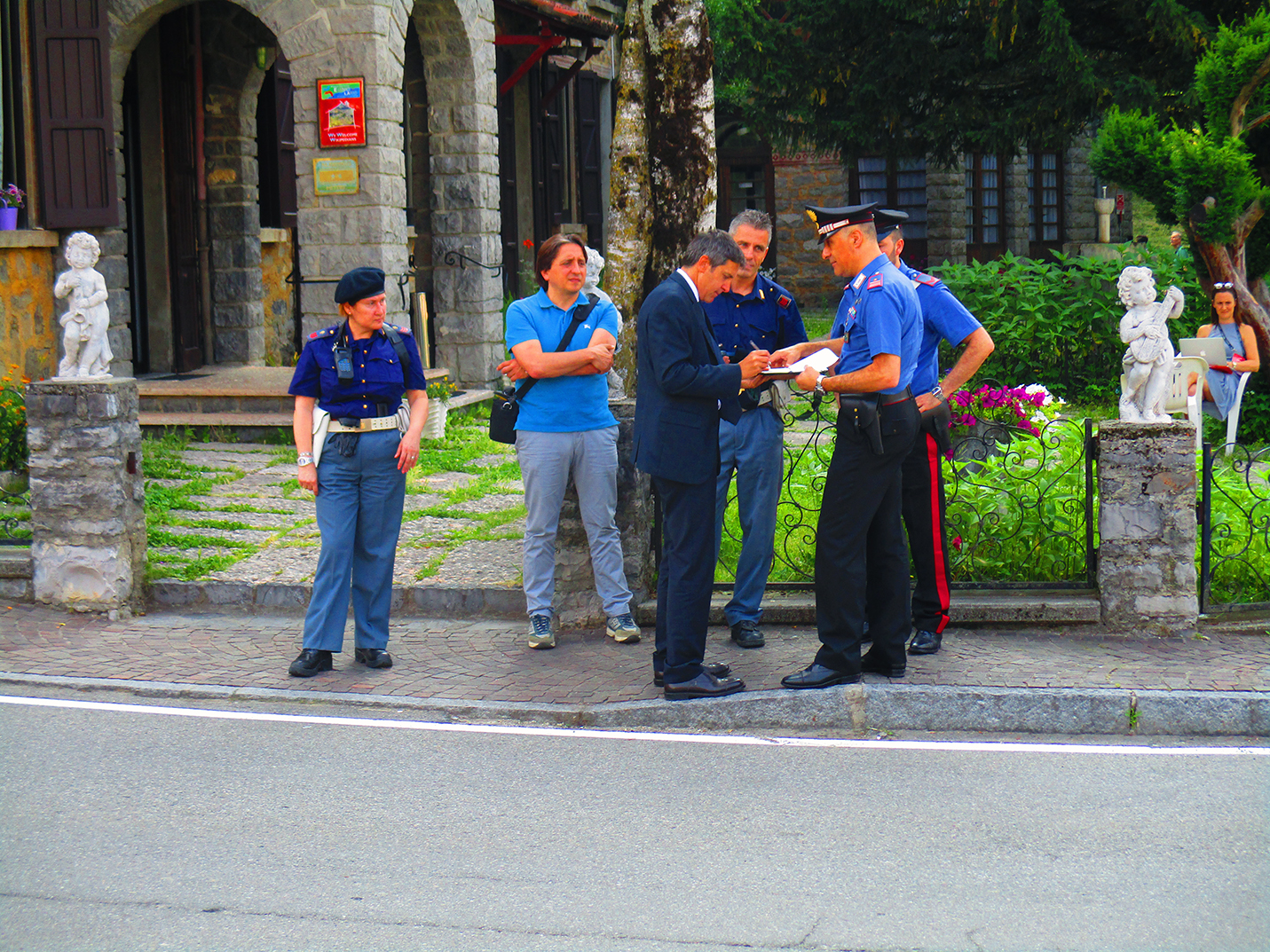
Carabinieri and Polizia di Stato during inspections

Crime in Italy is present in various forms throughout the nation. Italy is notorious for its organized crime groups, which are present worldwide and collectively referred to as the Mafia. Resultantly, financial crimes like corruption, extortion, and theft are the most common type of illicit activity in the country. Violent crimes are very rare in Italy evidenced by its homicide rate of 0.51 per 100,000 inhabitants in 2021, which is the lowest in Europe aside from micro states like Vatican City and San Marino, and one of the lowest in the world.

== Description ==
=== Overview ===
Italy is ranked 18th in the World Internal Security & Police Index with an index of 0.770 in 2023. In 2020, Italy had 398 law enforcement personnel per 100,000 inhabitants. Regionally, the southern regions of Italy has a high prevalence of intentional homicides, extortions, criminal conspiracies and robberies while the central-northern region of Italy has theft, rape, and exploitation of prostitution.

In 2015, the northern region of Emilia Romagna had the highest crime rate in Italy per 100,000 people.

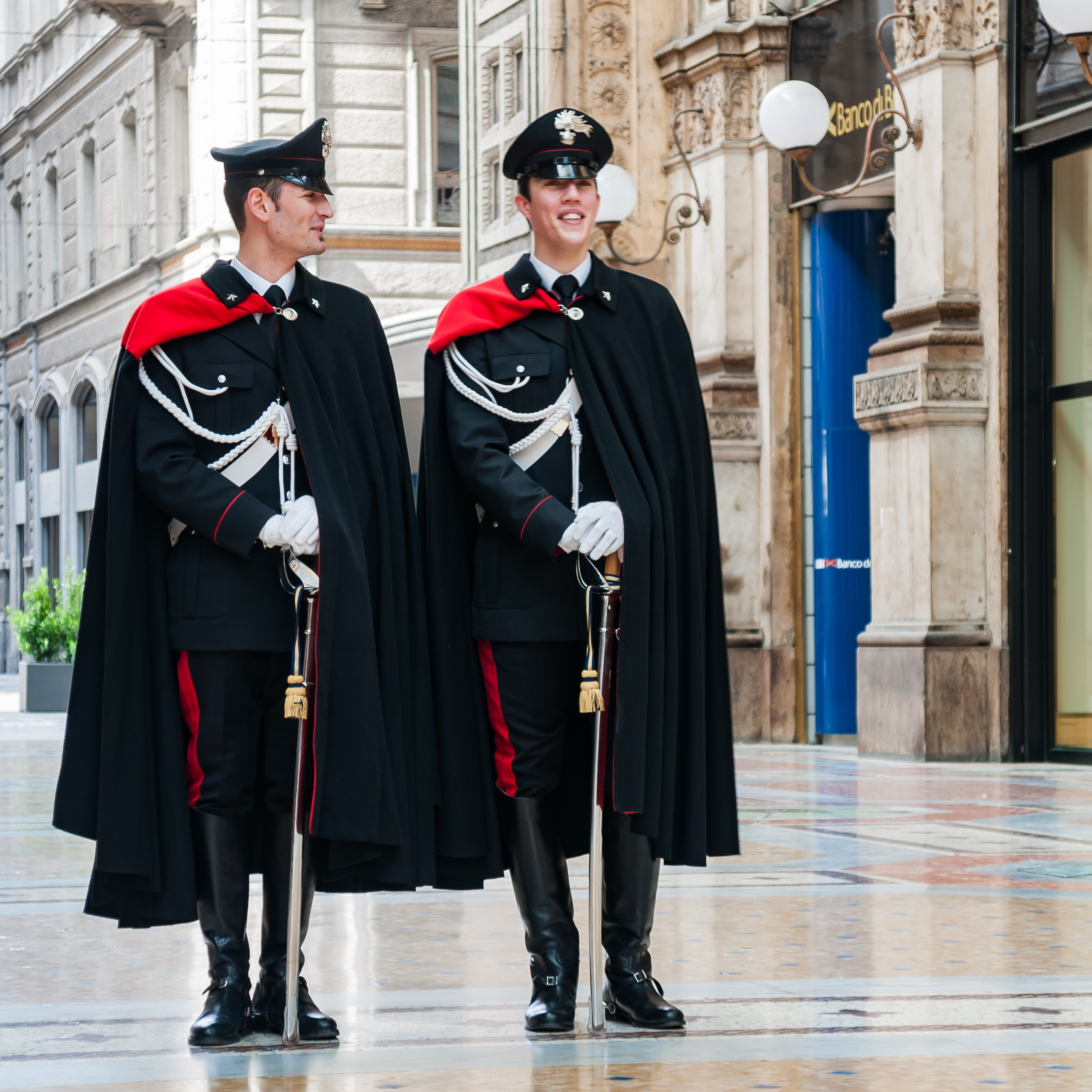
Carabinieri in full uniform

== Crime by type ==
=== Homicide and Assault ===
In the 1990s, homicide reached a peak of 5.49 per 100,000 people in 1991 and averaged at around 3 per 100,000 people. Afterwards, the homicide rates dropped drastically to 0.48 per 100,000 people, before rising to 0.57 in 2023.

==== Violence against women ====
In 2020, statistics showed that a third of women were exposed to violence; 8 out of 10 female murder victims were murdered by a current or previous partner. From 2000 to 2012, 2200 women were killed and 75% of those were murdered by a former or current partner. This represented about one murder every two days. A 2012 United Nations report noted that 90% of women who were raped or abused in Italy did not report the crime to police.

The infographic shows the women murdered in Italy in 2022, highlighting the type of relationship between the women and the authors of the homicide. Each woman is depicted in her own individuality, indicating the age group she belongs to.

Italy has taken steps to address violence against women and domestic violence, including creating Law No. 38 of 23 April 2009. Italy has also ratified the Convention on preventing and combating violence against women and domestic violence.

Regardless of these data, Italy has got a rate of murders of women equal to 0.43 (much lower than the rate of the murders of men), placing Italy at the fifth place by lowest rate of murders of women in the EU. Moreover, the trend has been decreasing since 1992.

Until the 1970s, in Southern Italy rape victims were often expected and forced to marry their rapist. In 1965, Franca Viola, a 17-year-old girl from Sicily, created a sensation when she refused to marry the man who kidnapped and raped her. In refusing this "rehabilitating marriage" to the perpetrator, she went against the traditional social norms of the time which dictated such a solution. In 1976 in the Supreme Court of Italy ruled that "the spouse who compels the other spouse to carnal knowledge by violence or threats commits the crime of carnal violence" [meaning rape] ("commette il delitto di violenza carnale il coniuge che costringa con violenza o minaccia l’altro coniuge a congiunzione carnale"). As well, in 1981, Italy repealed Article 544; this article stated that if a man who raped a woman married his victim, even if she was a minor, any sexual offence would lapse.

Traditionally, as in other Mediterranean-European areas, the concept of family honour was very important in Italy. Indeed, until 1981, the Criminal Code provided for mitigating circumstances for so-called honour killings. Traditionally, honour crimes used to be more prevalent in Southern Italy.

In Rome in 1992, a 45-year-old driving instructor was accused of rape. When he picked up an 18-year-old girl for her first driving lesson, he allegedly raped her for an hour, then told her that if she was to tell anyone he would kill her. Later that night she told her parents and her parents agreed to help her press charges. While the alleged rapist was convicted and sentenced, the Supreme Court of Cassation overturned the conviction in 1998 because the victim wore tight jeans. It was argued that she must have necessarily have had to help her attacker remove her jeans, thus making the act consensual ("because the victim wore very, very tight jeans, she had to help him remove them...and by removing the jeans...it was no longer rape but consensual sex"). The court stated in its decision "it is a fact of common experience that it is nearly impossible to slip off tight jeans even partly without the active collaboration of the person who is wearing them." This ruling sparked widespread feminist protest. The day after the decision, women in the Italian Parliament protested by wearing jeans and holding placards that read "Jeans: An Alibi for Rape." As a sign of support, the California Senate and Assembly followed suit. Soon Patricia Giggans, executive director of the Los Angeles Commission on Assaults Against Women, (now Peace Over Violence) made Denim Day an annual event. As of 2011 at least 20 U.S. states officially recognize Denim Day in April. Wearing jeans on this day has become an international symbol of protest against erroneous and destructive attitudes about sexual assault. In 2008 the Supreme Court of Cassation overturned the ruling, so there is no longer a "denim" defense to the charge of rape.

In 1996, Italy amended its rape laws, toughening the punishment for sexual assault and reclassifying it from a moral offense to a criminal felony.

After a few cases of infibulation practiced by complaisant medical practitioners within the African immigrant community came to public knowledge through media coverage, the Law n°7/2006 was passed in Italy on 1/9/2006, becoming effective on 1/28/2006, concerning "Measures of prevention and prohibition of any female genital mutilation practice"; the Act is also known as the Legge Consolo ("Consolo Act") named after its primary promoter, Senator Giuseppe Consolo. Article 6 of the law integrates the Italian Penal Code with Articles 583-Bis and 583-Ter, punishing any practice of female genital mutilation "not justifiable under therapeutical or medical needs" with imprisonment ranging from 4 to 12 years (3 to 7 years for any mutilation other than, or less severe than, clitoridectomy, excision or infibulation). Penalty can be reduced up to 2/3 if the harm caused is of modest entity (i.e. if partially or completely unsuccessful), but may also be elevated up to 1/3 if the victim is a minor or if the offense has been committed for profit. An Italian citizen or a foreign citizen legally resident in Italy can be punished under this law even if the offense is committed abroad; the law will as well afflict any individual of any citizenship in Italy, even illegally or provisionally. The law also mandates any medical practitioner found guilty under those provisions to have his/her medical license revoked for a minimum of six up to a maximum of ten years.

In 2025, a law was enacted adding femicide to the criminal code of Italy, and making it punishable by life in prison. Femicide under this law applies to women being killed as an “act of hatred or discrimination,” or “an act of control or possession or domination”, as well as women being killed because they wish to leave a relationship, and women being killed when there is an effort to restrict their “individual freedoms”.

=== Organized crime ===
Incidence of organized crime's extortion in Italy by province in 2012 High Mid Low Absent

Many worldwide crime organizations originated in Italy, and their influence is widespread in Italian society, directly affecting a reported 22% of citizens and 14.6% of Italy's Gross Domestic Product. Public figures such as former Prime Minister Silvio Berlusconi have been investigated for their association in organized criminal acts.

There are several separate criminal organizations controlling territory and business activities: Sicilian Cosa Nostra, Campanian Camorra, Calabrese 'Ndrangheta, and Apulian Sacra Corona Unita. More than 13 million people are involved into crime web. Their business involvement is on a European and global scale. Particularly in Naples an unusual high homicide rate and several drug addicted people have qualified the town as the most dangerous in Western Europe.

Businesses, entrepreneurs, shopkeepers, and craftsmen in these regions are expected to pay protection money. There is rarely any possibility of escaping payment, and those not complying find their business premises and lives at risk. People not able to meet demands might find their business partly or completely taken over by organized crime.

In 2009, organized crime in Italy generated $189 billion in revenue.

In 2020, there were only 28 murders related to the mafia, compared to an average of 527 murders between 1988 and 1992.

=== Sexual Violence ===
Italy has a lower per capita rate of rape than most of the advanced Western countries in the European Union.

According to Police authorities data, the rate of sexual assaults per 100,000 inhabitants is significantly higher in the Northern region than in the Southern ones. In 2009, Lombardia and Emilia Romagna were the regions with the highest rate of sexual offences per 100.000 inhabitants (9.7); followed by Trentino Alto Adige and Tuscany (9.5); Piedmont and Liguria (8.6); Umbria (8.4). In this respect, all major Southern regions like Sicily (6.8); Calabria (6.5); Apulia (6.2); Campania (6,0) were the safest in the national territory, with the only exception of Friuli Venezia Giulia (5.1) in the North.

=== Financial Crime and Corruption ===
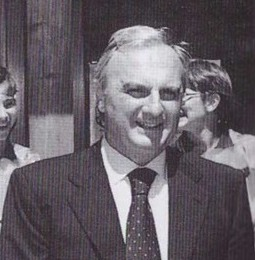
Calisto Tanzi was an Italian businessman and convicted fraudster. He founded Parmalat in 1961, after dropping out of college. Parmalat collapsed in 2003 making it Europe's biggest bankruptcy.

Fraud is a major contributor to Italy's crime rate, with some level of fraud appearing in all sectors of the economy since the country's founding in 1861. Notable cases of financial fraud include the collapse of Parmalat in the early years of the 21st century, and the Lockheed bribery scandal in the 1970s.

Insurance fraud also dramatically increases the cost of insurance in Italy, with 115,646 incidents of fraudulent claims in 2001 alone, with 3.28 percent of all claims in 2002 ascertained to have involved fraud. The percentage rose above ten percent in some of the southern provinces.

State employees have been perceived to have such a high rate of absenteeism, often feigning illness, that in 2008 the government introduced a law to harshly prosecute civil servants who are found to be making fraudulent claims about their health. Fraudulent claims of ill health are not confined to state employees, with some physicians often willing to receive bribes to certify non-existent conditions so that citizens may receive disability benefits. A case was revealed in 2010 where in one quartiere of Naples alone, 400 people were found to be claiming mental illness although healthy.

Corruption also remains a major problem in Italy, particularly in Southern Italy including Calabria, parts of Campania and Sicily where corruption perception is at a high level. Political parties are ranked as the most corrupt institution in Italy, closely followed by public officials and Parliament, according to Transparency International's Global Corruption Barometer 2013.

=== Drug-Related Crimes ===
Italy is considered one of the drug portals to Europe thanks to its geolocation and omnipresence of organised crime groups. Substantial amounts of illegal drugs are smuggled through the country with the goal of reaching other European nations. These narcotics are exported from drug producing regions principally via maritime route but also via air and land. Areas such as South America, specifically Colombia produce and supply cocaine, Southeast Asia and Afghanistan principally supply heroin, whereas north-western and south-eastern Europe, Morocco and Albania cultivate and deliver cannabis. The drugs are bought and distributed both in Italy and in the rest of Europe by organised crime groups.

Italians are not solely transporters and smugglers of narcotics, they are also consumers. While using is not a crime itself, possession for personal use is.

The general population survey on drugs conducted in 2017 deduced that Italians within the ages of 15 and 64, in the course of their life, had, at least once, made use of psychoactive substances, with 1 in 10 using in the past year. Cannabis is the most used drug within the population, with an estimated 1.1 % using it daily, whereas, 20.9% of young adults have used in the last year.

Use of cocaine and other psychoactive drugs is reported to be lower within the peninsula, where it has been recorded that 1.7% of young adults have used cocaine in the past year. Moreover, Italy is considered one of the EU countries with the highest number of high risk opioid use, with high use of off label drugs.

The number of drug law offenders in 2019 was 73 804. In 2017, over 35,000 people were convicted by the police for drug related crimes, this number decreased in October 2018 to about 23,600 people. Furthermore, in 2015, a third of the aggregate of convicts was in prison due to drug related crimes. In fact, Italy held the record amongst the 47 member states of the European Council for drug related convictions.

== Crime by region ==
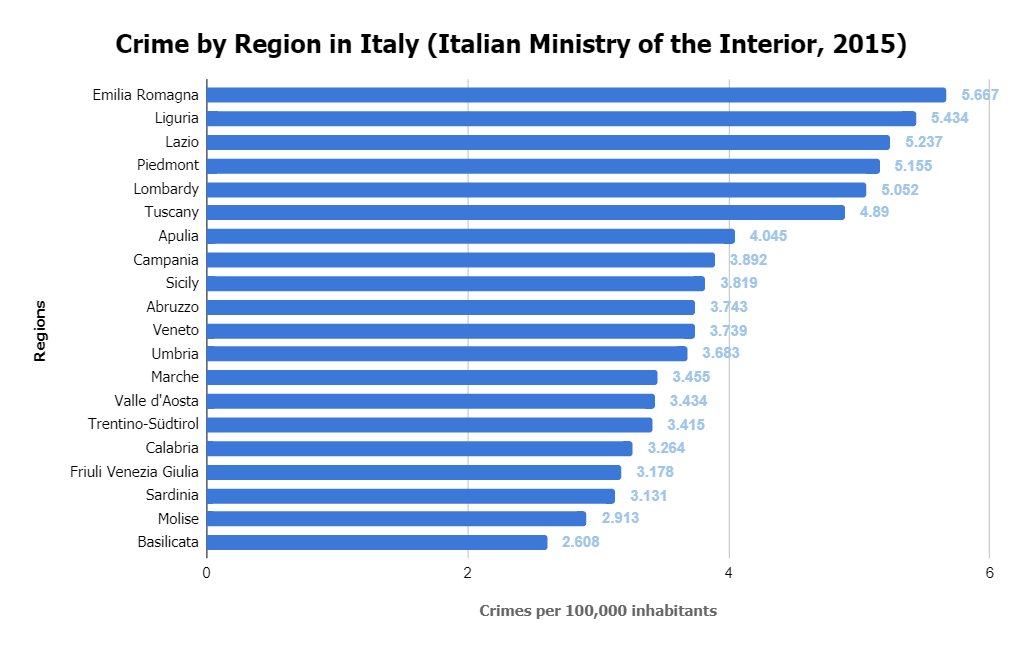
2015 crime rate in the Italian regions

=== Southern Italy ===
Southern Italy contains lower overall crime rates in comparison to Northern Italy. However, Mafia-related corruption and extortion are widely prevalent in Campania, Sicily, Calabria, and nearby areas. Such crimes also extend into certain northern urban areas, but Naples and some provinces of Calabria, Apulia and Sardinia have a higher murder rate than northern cities.

=== Sicily ===
Crime in Sicily has consistently been dominated by the Cosa Nostra mafia group throughout history. As such, Sicilian criminality has been highly glamorized in the American film industry. However, it is highly unlikely that civilians or tourists will run into any trouble with the Mafia. Violent crime is very low; at 0.34 per 100,000 inhabitants as of 2019, the homicide rate in Sicily is among the lowest in both Italy and the world. However, petty crimes such as fraud and pickpocketing are not as uncommon in Sicily. Furthermore, extortion is endemic, as an estimated 80% of Sicilian businesses pay a pizzo to the Mafia. Resultantly, more than 160 million euros are extorted yearly from businesses in Palermo, and investigators estimate that Sicily as a whole pays 10 times that figure.

=== Central and Northern Italy ===
In comparison with southern Italy, the central and northern regions of the country are generally perceived as less prone to crime by foreigners. However, in recent years, the north has tended to exhibit slightly higher levels of crime than the south, evidenced by the northern cities of Milan, Florence, Turin, Genoa, and Rimini scoring the highest crime rates in Italy. On the other hand, regions such as Marche, Tuscany, Umbria, and Friuli Venezia Giulia show relatively lower indicators of criminality. Despite this, the northern regions of Italy have consistently demonstrated lower levels of extortion and corruption than their southern counterparts.

=== Rome ===
According to the European Union’s statistics-gathering wing, there were 0.7 homicides per 100,000 people in Rome as of 2015. This puts the homicide rate in the capital at a slightly higher rate than the national average of 0.5, but this is still by all accounts a very low homicide rate, especially for a large city, and amongst the lowest in European capital cities. As with the rest of Italy, pickpocketing, petty fraud, and automobile theft are much more common than violent crimes.

== Imprisonment ==
As of 30 April 2026 the 189 penal institutions in Italy held 64,412 inmates, of whom 2,844 were women and 20,307 were foreign nationals, against an official capacity of 51,265 places, according to the Department of Penitentiary Administration of the Ministry of Justice. The department calculates capacity on the basis of 9 square metres for the first inmate plus 5 square metres for each of the others, a more generous standard than the 6 plus 4 square metres used by the Committee for the Prevention of Torture.

In the Council of Europe's SPACE I penal statistics for 2025, published on 19 May 2026, Italy recorded 121 inmates per 100 available places, against 95.2 for Europe as a whole, and was one of nine prison administrations classified as severely overcrowded, alongside Türkiye and France (both 131), Croatia (123), Malta (118) and Cyprus (117).

In 2013, in the pilot judgment Torreggiani and Others v. Italy, the European Court of Human Rights found that the conditions of seven prisoners held in the prisons of Busto Arsizio and Piacenza violated Article 3 of the Convention, which prohibits inhuman or degrading treatment. The judgment also stated that overcrowding in Italian prisons was not incidental to those cases but a systemic, structural problem. It gave Italy one year to introduce remedies with both preventive and compensatory effect.

== See also ==
- List of major crimes in Italy
