= Certosa di Farneta =

It is a Carthusian monastery located north of Lucca, in Tuscany, Italy

Coordinates: 43.8659°N 10.4170°E

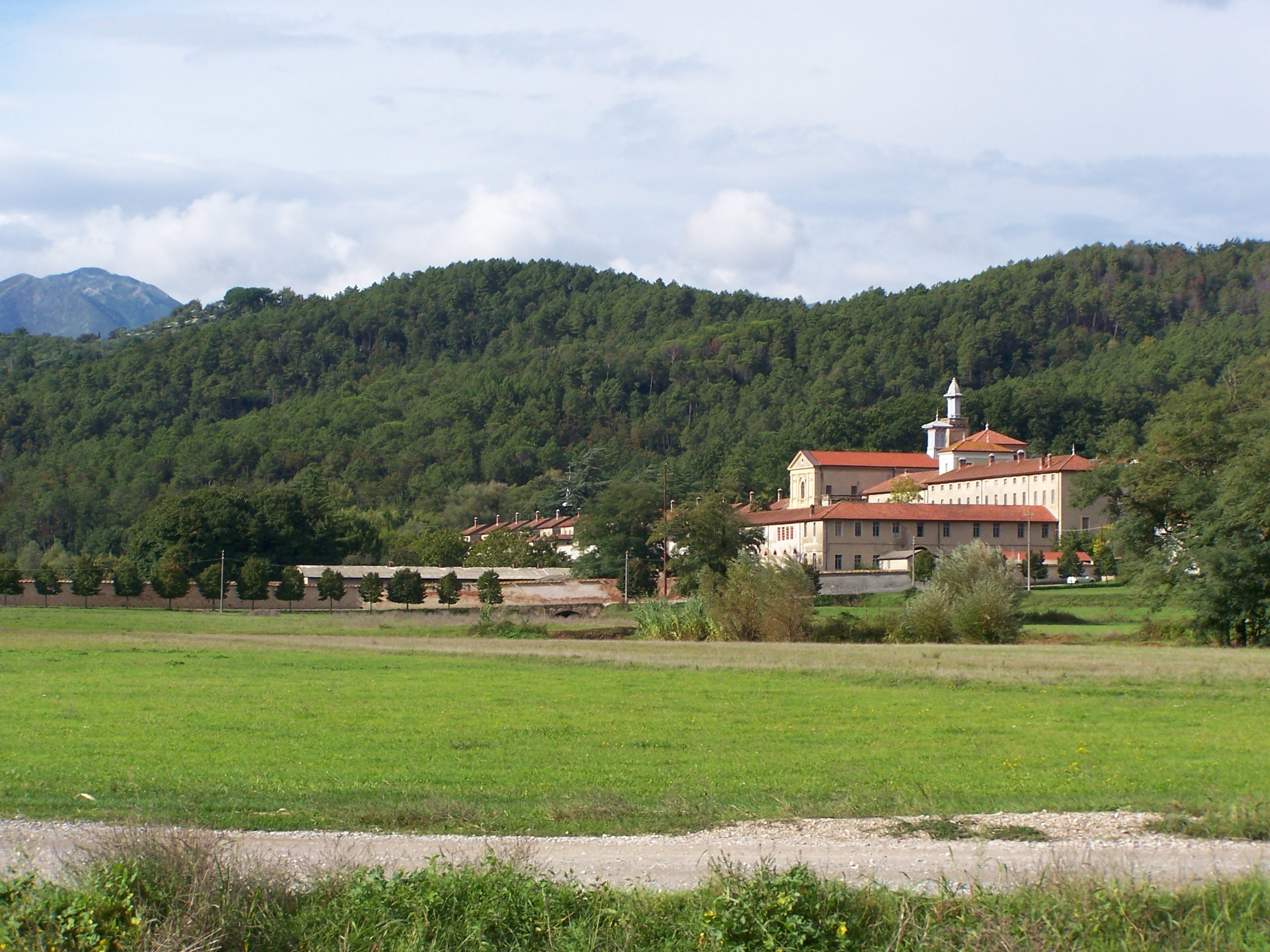
Certosa with monks quarters at left

Farneta Charterhouse, in Italian Certosa di Farneta (also Certosa di Santo Spirito di Farneta or Certosa di Maggiano) is a Carthusian monastery (charterhouse) just north of Lucca, region of Tuscany, Italy.

== History ==
The charterhouse was founded in the early 14th century. In the 17th century, the painters Giovanni Fondagna and Stefano Cassiani worked on the interior of the church, including the cupola and two altar-pieces. The monastery was suppressed by Napoleonic forces in 1809, only to be re-occupied later in the 19th century.

== 20th century ==
In September 1944, monks from the charterhouse opened their doors to troops from the 16th SS Panzergrenadier Division, who said they came bearing gifts for the abbey. They broke into the monastery to arrest 32 partisans and Jews being sheltered in the monastery. Some of the refugees were able to escape. Six monks and six lay brothers were arrested, tortured, and killed by firing squad.

A plaque at the entrance of the monastery, dedicated on 20 January 1985, nearly four decades after the event, reads:

Forty years after the Liberation the Association of the Resistance Fighters in Lucchesia and the Municipal Authorities of Lucca remember the martyrdom of six Carthusian fathers, six Carthusian brothers and thirty-two civilians in September of 1944. Nazi savagery imposed the same death both on the monks and on those who at the darkest hour had found brotherly hospitality in these sacred precincts. The presence of the Prime Minister at the inauguration of this memorial stone ensures the entry into the history of the Italian people of the witness of these victims. Charterhouse of Farneta, January 20, 1985.

Among the twelve Carthusians killed were two Germans, one Swiss, one Venezuelan, and one Spaniard. The remaining monks were also from diverse countries. Those killed were Benedetto Lapuente, Bruno D'Amico, Raffaele Cantero, Adriano Compagnon, Adriano Clerc, Michele Nota, Giorgio Maritano, Pio Egger, Martino Binz, Gabriele Maria Costa, Salvador Montes de Oca, and Aldo Mei. It is said that when the refugees asked for asylum, the prior Dom Martino Binz consulted with the procurator Dom Gabriele Costa, and the novice master Dom Pio Egger. Binz stated:

If it were Jesus himself knocking at the door, what would we tell him? Would we have the courage to send him off to die?

They opened the door.

After the war, the monks remained silent about the execution. In 2000 the Holy See requested a report from the monks, to be sent to the Commission of the New Martyrs. Journalist Luigi Accattoli was the first person external to the Commission who read the report and in 2014 published the book La strage di Farneta - The Farneta Massacre -.

== Bibliography ==
- Sciascia, Giuseppina, The Silent Summer of 1944 , in «L'Osservatore Romano. English Weekly Edition», 2005, February 2. Republished as "Carthusian Booklets Series", no. 10. Arlington, VT: Charterhouse of the Transfiguration, 2006
- (in Italian) Accattoli, Luigi, La strage di Farneta. Storia sconosciuta dei dodici Certosini fucilati dai tedeschi nel 1944, Soveria Mannelli, Rubbettino, 2013
