= 1995 in Italy =

- Decades: 1970s; 1980s; 1990s; 2000s; 2010s
- See also: History of Italy; Timeline of Italian history; List of years in Italy

Events during the year 1995 in Italy.

== Incumbents ==
- President: Oscar Luigi Scalfaro
- Prime Minister:

- Silvio Berlusconi (until 17 January)
- Lamberto Dini (from 17 January)

== Events ==
- 24 March - Murder of Gianfranco Cuccuini
- 11 June – 1995 Italian referendum
- 16 August – Chilivani massacre
- 5 September - Murder of Luigia Borrelli
- 13 December – Banat Air Flight 166 accident

== Births ==
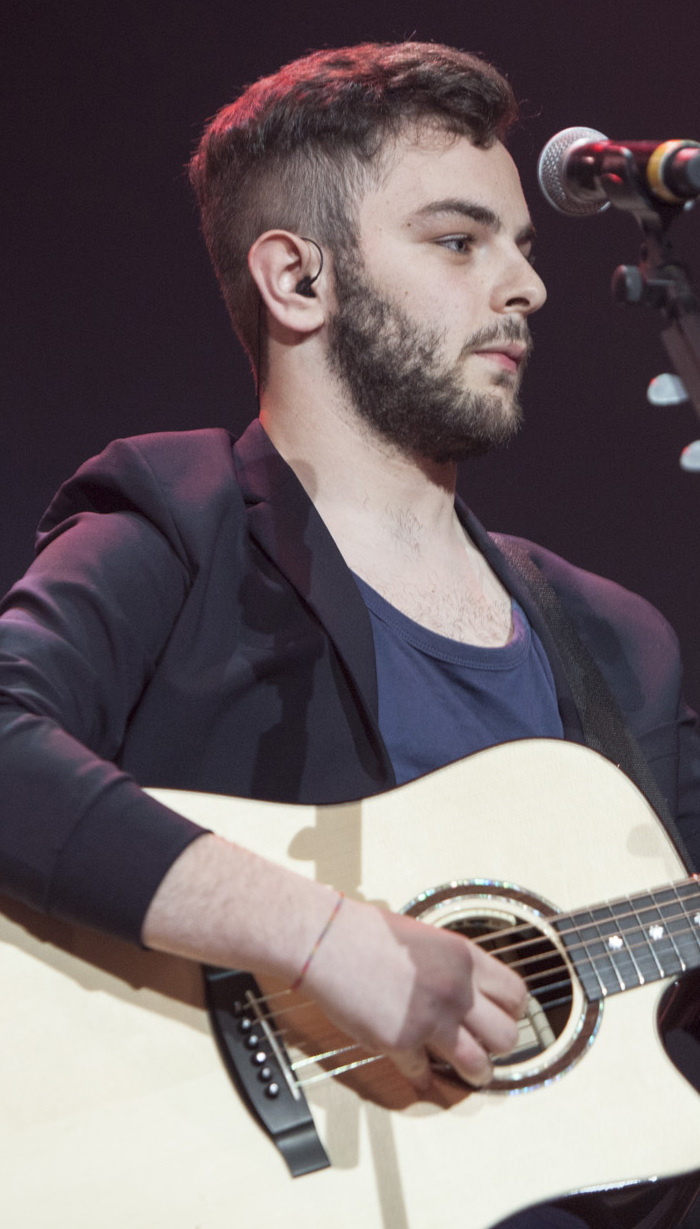
Lorenzo Fragola

- 24 February – Luca Ghiotto, footballer
- 16 March – Daniele Cardelli, footballer
- 16 March – Daniele Cardelli, footballer
- 18 March – Pierluigi Gollini, footballer
- 23 March – Alberto Boniotti, footballer
- 24 March – Luca Lezzerini, footballer
- 12 April – Lorenzo Venuti, footballer
- 26 April – Lorenzo Fragola, singer-songwriter
- 18 May – Marco Lazzaroni, rugby union player
- 30 June – Andrea Petagna, footballer
- 1 July – Federico Palmieri, footballer
- 14 July – Riccardo Ferrara, footballer
- 5 August – Stefano Sensi, footballer
- 30 August – David Zimmerhofer, footballer
- 23 September – Francesco Mileto, footballer
- 13 October – Leonardo Morosini, footballer
- 30 October – Leonardo Morosini, footballer
- 16 November – Nicola Sambo, footballer

== Deaths ==
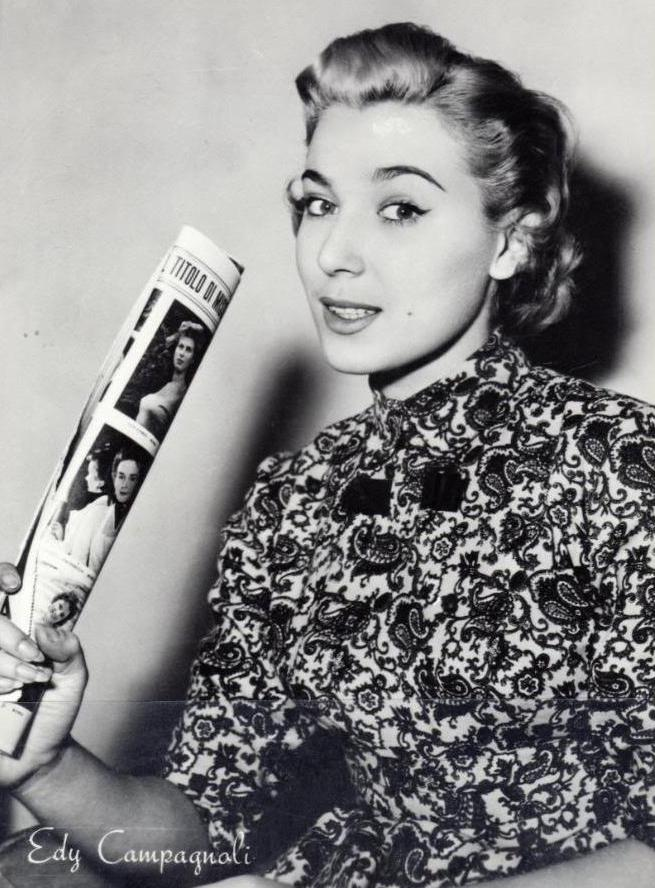
Edy Campagnoli

- 19 January – Italo Viglianesi, trade unionist and syndicalist (b. 1916)
- 6 February – Edy Campagnoli, television personality and actress (b. 1934)
- 13 February – Alberto Burri, artist (b. 1915)
- 19 March – Giuseppe Nirta, mafia boss (b. 1913)
- 27 March – Maurizio Gucci, businessman and murder victim (b. 1948)
- 9 April – Paola Borboni, film actress (b. 1900)
- 22 April – Carlo Ceresoli, footballer (b. 1910)
- 25 April – Andrea Fortunato, footballer (b. 1971)
- 27 April – Maurizio Gucci, businessman (b. 1948)
- 12 May – Mia Martini, singer and songwriter (b. 1947)
- 12 June – Arturo Benedetti Michelangeli, pianist (b. 1920)
- 18 July – Fabio Casartelli, cyclist (b. 1970)
- 20 August – Hugo Pratt, comics creator (b. 1927)
- 2 October – Alessandro Rampini, footballer (b. 1896)
