= Femicide in Italy =

Crime in Italy

On 26 November 2025, the members of the Italian Chamber of Deputies voted unanimously to introduce the crime of femicide as a distinct law.

== History ==
The 2023 murders of Giulia Cecchettin and of Giulia Tramontano led to widespread public outcry and a debate about violence against women. In November 2025, Prime Minister Giorgia Meloni supported the passing of the law against femicide. It was introduced into the country's criminal code with the penalty of life imprisonment. The bill was passed on the International Day for the Elimination of Violence against Women. Law No. 181 of 2 December 2025 was passed unanimously. In January 2026, the first person was charged with the crime under the new law.

== Examples ==
- Buonvicino massacre
- Murder of Luigia Borrelli
- Murder of Monica Calò
- Murder of Giulia Cecchettin
- Murder of Nada Cella
- Murder of Sara Di Pietrantonio
- Murder of Giordana Di Stefano
- Murder of Alberica Filo della Torre
- Murder of Chiara Poggi
- Murder of Elisa Pomarelli
- Murder of Nadia Roccia
- Murder of Giulia Tramontano
