= 1996 in Italy =

- Decades: 1970s; 1980s; 1990s; 2000s; 2010s
- See also: History of Italy; Timeline of Italian history; List of years in Italy

Events in Italy in 1996:

== Incumbents ==
- President – Oscar Luigi Scalfaro
- Prime Minister – Lamberto Dini (until 17 May), Romano Prodi (starting 17 May).

== Events ==
- Vulcanair is founded, as did airline company Minerva Airlines.
- January 23: 11 people die in the Secondigliano district, in Naples, due to the Secondigliano tragedy.
- February 26: The Democratic Alliance dissolves and is succeeded by the Democratic Union.
- February 27: The political party Italian Renewal is founded.
- May 6: Murder of Nada Cella.
- August 10: a little girl named Angela Celentano, who disappeared near Naples, the little girl was never found again.
- November 19: Buonvicino massacre.

== Elections ==
- Italian general election, 1996
- Italian Senate election in Lombardy, 1996
- Sicilian regional election, 1996

== Sport ==
- 1995–96 Serie A
- 1995–96 Serie B
- 1995–96 Coppa Italia
- 1996 Supercoppa Italiana
- 1996 Torneo di Viareggio
- 1995–96 Serie A (ice hockey) season
- 1995–97 FIRA Trophy
- 1996 Italian Grand Prix
- 1996 San Marino Grand Prix
- 1996 Italian motorcycle Grand Prix
- 1996 Giro d'Italia
- Italy at the 1996 Summer Olympics
- Italy at the 1996 Summer Paralympics

== Film ==
- 53rd Venice International Film Festival

== Births ==
- 1 February – Gianluigi Quinzi, Italian tennis player
- 17 February – Erika Fasana, Italian artistic gymnast
- 18 December – Giordano Mazzocchi, Italian Musical artist

== Deaths ==
- January 4 - Tino Bianchi, 90, actor
- February 29 – Mario Zagari, 82, politician
- March 31 – Nino Borsari, 84, cyclist
- May 25 – Renzo De Felice, 67, historian
- May 31 – Luciano Lama, 74, syndicalist
- June 14 – Gesualdo Bufalino, 75, writer
- June 18 – Gino Bramieri, 69, comedian
- December 8 – Prince Eugenio, Duke of Genoa, 90, member of House of Savoy
- December 15 – Giuseppe Dossetti, 83, politician and priest
- December 19 – Marcello Mastroianni, 72, actor
