= 1997 in Italy =

- Decades: 1970s; 1980s; 1990s; 2000s; 2010s
- See also: History of Italy; Timeline of Italian history; List of years in Italy

Events in the year 1997 in Italy.

== Incumbents ==
- President – Oscar Luigi Scalfaro
- Prime Minister – Romano Prodi

== Events ==
=== January ===
- 3 January - The new Public Funding for Political Parties Act comes into force.
- 16 January - A large farmers' protest rally in Lombardy against the Milk quota paralyzes the whole of Northern Italy.

=== February ===
- 5 February - Massimo D'Alema, leader of the majority Democratic Party of the Left (PDS), is appointed president of the Third Parliamentary Commission for the revision of the Constitution.

=== March ===
- 9 March - Murders of Elisa Marafini and Patrizio Bovi in Cori, Lazio.

=== April ===
- 9 April - The Communist Refoundation Party (PRC), which, externally, supports the government, votes against the resolution that authorizes Operation Alba: a multinational peacekeeping force led by Italy and intended to help the Albanian government restore law and order in their troubled country after the 1997 rebellion in Albania. The measure is approved thanks to the favorable vote of the center-right opposition.
- 27 April - Local elections help the center-left government coalition make some gains in multiple cities.

=== May ===
- 9 May - A separatist commando connected with the regionalist Lega Nord party occupies with a tank the Campanile of San Marco Square in Venice.
- 14 May - The Parliament approves the Administrative Decentralization Act (Law 15 May 1997, no. 127) which implements the regional federalism.

=== June ===
- 4 June - The Parliament approves a new Labor Law (Law 24 June 1997, no. 196) in order to reduce the high unemployment.
- 6 June - The Sicilian Mafia boss, Pietro Aglieri, nicknamed U Signurinu ("The Little Gentleman") for his relatively sophisticated education and The Guardian’s pick as Italy’s “Emerging Man of the Year, 1995,” is arrested in the town of Bagheria, Sicily. Aglieri is tried, in absentia, for the 1992 bombing deaths of Mafia investigators Giovanni Falcone and Paolo Borsellino. Aglieri is sentenced to life imprisonment.
- 15 June - A seven-part referendum is held. Voters are asked to approve or deny the repeal of laws concerning privatisation, conscientious objectors, hunting, the judiciary, journalists, and dissolution of the Ministry of Agrarian Politics. Although all of the proposed changes are approved by participating voters, turnout is a mere 30%, and falls below the required voter turnout of 50%. The results are invalid and the referendum a failure.

=== August ===
- 20 August - Morrone killings.

=== September ===
- 26 September
  - Twenty-two Sicilian Mafiosi are sentenced to life imprisonment for the murder of the magistrate Giovanni Falcone in 1992.
  - An earthquake occurs in Umbria and Marche regions, Central Italy. The foreshock occurs at 2:33 am CEST (0:33 UTC), rated 5.7 on the Richter scale, and the second, primary shock, registers 6.1 on the Richter scale, occurs at 11:40 am CEST (9:40 UTC), and claims eleven lives. Extensive damage to important cultural centers and heritage sites is observed, some of which are completely lost to the devastating event. Basilica of St. Francis, Assisi- two specialists and two friars amongst the group tasked with inspecting the damage beneath the Basilica are killed when an aftershock rocks the building, causing the vault to collapse. Along with these four unfortunate souls, the frescoes contained within the collapsed vault, chronicling the life of St. Francis di Assisi by Giotto, are almost entirely obliterated. Frescoes in the Upper Church of the Basilica suffer minor damage.

=== November ===
- 9 November - The Mani Pulite scandal magistrate Antonio Di Pietro is elected member of the Italian Senate in a by-election. Supported by the center-left government coalition, he defeats the right-wing journalist and former minister Giuliano Ferrara in the Mugello constituency, a left wing stronghold.

== Births ==
15 April – Leonardo Fabbri, shot putter

== Deaths ==
- May 4 – Egidio Armelloni, Italian gymnast (b. 1909)
- May 5
  - Giulio Balestrini, Italian footballer. (b. 1907)
  - Walter Gotell, German actor (b. 1924)
- May 22 – Alziro Bergonzo, Italian architect and painter (b. 1906)
- June 13 – Vittorio Mussolini, Benito Mussolini's son (b. 1916)
- July 15 – Gianni Versace, fashion designer (b. 1946)
- December 25 – Giorgio Strehler, opera and theatre director (b. 1921)

== See also ==
- List of Italian films of 1997
