= 1998 in Italy =

- Decades: 1970s; 1980s; 1990s; 2000s; 2010s
- See also: History of Italy; Timeline of Italian history; List of years in Italy

Events in the year 1998 in Italy.

== Incumbents ==
- President - Oscar Luigi Scalfaro
- Prime Minister – Romano Prodi (until 21 October) / Massimo D'Alema (starting 21 October)

== Events ==
=== January ===
- 3 January - The public debt is diminished by nearly 50 billions.

=== March ===
- 14 March - Murder of Nadia Roccia.

=== July ===
- 14 July - Murder of Monica Calò.

=== Full date unknown ===
- FIGD Italian Golf Federation For Disabled is founded.

== Births ==
- January 8 – Manuel Locatelli, footballer

== Deaths ==
- September 26 – Giovanni Barbini, Italian naval officer (b. 1901)

== See also ==
- 1999 in Italian television
- List of Italian films of 1999
