= Giordana =

Giordana is an Italian surname. Notable people with the surname include:

- Andrea Giordana (born 1946), Italian singer and actor
- Marco Tullio Giordana (born 1950), Italian film director and screenwriter
- Marina Giordana (born 1955), Italian actress
- Santiago Giordana (born 1995), Argentine footballer

== See also ==
- Giordana Di Stefano (1995–2015), Italian femicide victim
