= Milonga =

Milonga may refer to

- Milonga (music)
- Milonga (dance)
- Milonga (dance event)
- Milonga (film)
- Milonga a track from the 2008 album Redenção by Brazilian rock band Fresno
- Milonga, a piece by Jorge Cardoso
