= Donatella Raffai =

Italian radio and television writer, and presenter (1943–2022)

- Born: 8 September 1943; Fabriano, Italy
- Died: 10 February 2022 (aged 78); Rome, Italy
- Occupation(s): Radio and television writer and presenter

Donatella Raffai (8 September 1943 – 10 February 2022) was an Italian radio and television writer and presenter.

== Life and career ==
Born in Fabriano on 8 September 1943, Raffai started her career as a public relations manager for RCA and as an image consultant for several singers, notably Mia Martini and Nada.

In 1971 she debuted as a radio presenter, and she made her television debut in 1980, with the show Chi ci invita?. After co-writing and co-hosting with Corrado Augias the Rai 3 program Telefono giallo, the popularity among the general public came in 1989, with the Rai 3 true-crime program about missing persons Chi l'ha visto?, that she wrote and hosted until 1994 and for which she was awarded a Premio Regia Televisiva and a Telegatto. In the following years she presented several programs, until her last work, Giallo 4, that she wrote and hosted between 1999 and 2000 on Rete 4.

Raffai died after a long illness on 10 February 2022, at the age of 78.
