= Paolo Regoli =

Italian footballer

Personal information
- Date of birth: 24 April 1991 (age 35)
- Place of birth: Pontedera, Italy
- Height: 1.81 m (5 ft 11 in)
- Position: Midfielder

Team information
- Current team: Mobilieri Ponsacco
- Number: 21

Youth career
- Pontedera

Senior career*
Years	Team	Apps	(Gls)
2008–2010	Pontedera	47	(3)
2010–2011	Rosignano	31	(3)
2011–2015	Pontedera	93	(12)
2014–2015	→ Avellino (loan)	20	(2)
2015–2016	Latina	4	(0)
2016	→ Livorno (loan)	2	(0)
2016–2017	Mantova	36	(3)
2017–2019	Pistoiese	61	(3)
2019–2020	Pianese	24	(1)
2020–2023	San Donato	90	(5)
2023–	Mobilieri Ponsacco	5	(1)
- * Club domestic league appearances and goals as of 8 October 2023

Paolo Regoli (born 24 April 1991) is an Italian footballer who plays as a midfielder for Serie D club Mobilieri Ponsacco.

== Club career ==
He made his Serie C debut for Pontedera on 1 September 2013 in a game against Grosseto.

He joined Pistoiese in the summer of 2017.

On 27 August 2019, he signed with Pianese.

On 3 September 2020 he joined San Donato in Serie D.
