= 2000 in Italy =

- Decades: 1980s; 1990s; 2000s; 2010s; 2020s
- See also: History of Italy; Timeline of Italian history; List of years in Italy

Events in the year 2000 in Italy.

== Events ==
- 2 July – France wins the UEFA European Championship by defeating Italy, 2–1 following a golden goal in the final game at the Stadion Feijenoord in Rotterdam, Netherlands.

Major events in Italy in 2000:

2

2000 in Italian television

C

Coppa Italia 2000–01 G

2000 Giro d'Italia

2000 Italian Grand Prix

I

Italian films of 2000

Incumbents

- President: Carlo Azeglio Ciampi
- Prime Minister: Massimo D'Alema (until 25 April), Giuliano Amato (starting 25 April)

L

List of Italian films of 2000

List of number-one hits of 2000 (Italy)

O

Italy at the 2000 Summer Olympics

S

2000 San Marino Grand Prix

Serie A 1999–2000

Serie B 1999–2000

Serie B 2000–01

U

Umbrian regional election, 2000

V

57th Venice International Film Festival

Venetian regional election, 2000

W

2000 Women's Water Polo Olympic Qualifier

World Youth Day 2000

== Deaths ==
- 9 January – Bruno Zevi, Italian architect, historian, curator and author. (born 1918)
- 1 February – Pina Cei, Italian actress. (born 1904)
- 13 March – Carlo Tagnin, Italian football player and manager. (born 1932)
- 5 April – Rolando Zanni, Italian Olympic skier. (born 1914)
- 5 May – Gino Bartali, Italian racing cyclist. born 1914)
- 5 June – Franco Rossi, Italian film screenwriter and director. (born 1919)
- 3 July – Fiorentino Sullo, Italian politician. (born 1921)
- 1 August – Benedetto Pola, Italian cyclist. (born 1915)
- 4 September – Antonio Ruberti, Italian politician and engineer. (born 1927)
- 15 November – Pietro Pasinati, Italian footballer. (born 1910)
