= San Donato Tavarnelle =

Italian football club

- Full name: San Donato Tavarnelle s.r.l.
- Founded: 2006; 20 years ago
- Ground: Stadio Gastone Brilli Peri, Montevarchi, Italy
- Capacity: 4500
- Chairman: Andrea Bacci
- Manager: Lamberto Magrini
- League: Serie D Group E
- 2023–24: Serie D Group B, 13th of 18
Home colours	Away colours	Third colours

San Donato Tavarnelle s.r.l. is an Italian association football club, based in San Donato in Poggio and Tavarnelle Val di Pesa, Tuscany that plays in Serie D. They first gained promotion to the Serie C in 2022, having won the 2021–22 Serie D Group E title.

== History ==
=== Foundation ===
The club was founded in 2006 after the merger of San Donato and Libertas Tavarnelle as Associazione Sportiva Dilettantistica San Donato Tavarnelle.

=== Serie D ===
In the season 2013–14 the team was promoted for the first time, from Eccellenza Tuscany/B to Serie D.

After a number of seasons in the top amateur league of Italy, the 2021–22 Serie D season saw San Donato Tavarnelle winning the Group E title, thus ensuring the small Tuscanian club a historical first promotion to professional football.

== Current squad ==
As of 27 January 2023

Note: Flags indicate national team as defined under FIFA eligibility rules; some limited exceptions apply. Players may hold more than one non-FIFA nationality.

No.	Pos.	Nation	Player
1	GK	ITA	Valerio Biagini (on loan from Empoli)
4	MF	ITA	Matteo Calamai
5	MF	ITA	Francesco Nunziatini (on loan from Inter)
6	DF	ITA	Matteo Gorelli (captain)
9	FW	ITA	Edoardo Marzierli
10	FW	ITA	Federico Russo
11	FW	ITA	Elia Galligani
12	GK	ITA	Filippo Campinotti (on loan from Empoli)
13	DF	ITA	Pietro Carcani
14	MF	ITA	Paolo Regoli
15	MF	ITA	Leonardo Borghi
17	MF	ITA	Alfonso Sepe (on loan from Sampdoria)
18	MF	ITA	Tommaso Bianchi
19	DF	ITA	Giacomo Siniega (on loan from Empoli)

No.	Pos.	Nation	Player
21	FW	ITA	Filippo Gerardini
22	GK	ITA	Daniele Cardelli
23	MF	ITA	Edoardo Bovolon
24	FW	ITA	Francesco Noccioli
25	MF	ITA	Alessio Rossi (on loan from Empoli)
27	DF	ITA	Duccio Brenna
29	DF	ITA	Alberto Montini
30	DF	ITA	Enrico Rossi (on loan from Lecco)
32	DF	ITA	Matteo Contipelli
34	FW	ITA	Leonardo Ubaldi (on loan from Pisa)
36	DF	ITA	Leonardo Pezzola (on loan from Empoli)
75	FW	ALB	Dennis Gjana
76	MF	ITA	Andrea Viviani (on loan from Atalanta)

=== Out on loan ===
Note: Flags indicate national team as defined under FIFA eligibility rules; some limited exceptions apply. Players may hold more than one non-FIFA nationality.

No.	Pos.	Nation	Player
—	DF	ITA	Tommaso Ciurli (at Siena until 30 June 2023)
