= 1999 in Italy =

- Decades: 1970s; 1980s; 1990s; 2000s; 2010s
- See also: History of Italy; Timeline of Italian history; List of years in Italy

Events in the year 1999 in Italy.

== Incumbents ==
- President – Oscar Luigi Scalfaro
- Prime Minister – Massimo D'Alema

== Events ==
- 1 January – The Euro Currency entered circulation in the digital transaction in the European Union (EU) Eurozone member area countries.
- 24 June – 4 July –The 1999 IFAF World Cup is held in Palermo.
- 1-11 September – 56th Venice International Film Festival

1999 European Parliament election in Italy

1999 European Parliament election in Veneto

=== Sport ===
==== Athletics ====
- 1999 IAAF World Half Marathon Championships

==== Canoeing ====
- 1999 ICF Canoe Sprint World Championships

==== Cycling ====
- 1999 Giro d'Italia
- 1999 UCI Road World Championships

==== Football ====
- Serie A 1999–2000
- Serie B 1998–99
- Serie B 1999–2000
- 1999 Supercoppa Italiana

==== Motor racing ====
- 1999 Italian Grand Prix

==== Volleyball ====
- 1999 Women's European Volleyball Championship

==== Water Polo ====
- 1999 Women's European Water Polo Championship
- 1999 Men's European Water Polo Championship

== Deaths ==
- 14 October – Franca Dominici, actress (born 1907)
- 8 December – Pupella Maggio, actress (born 1910)
- 23 December – Silvio Gava, politician (born 1901)
- 29 December – Giuseppe Ballerio, footballer (born 1909)

== See also ==
- 1999 in Italian television
- List of Italian films of 1999
