= Murder of Giordana Di Stefano =

2015 murder in Italy

- Location: Nicolosi, Catania, Sicily
- Date: 7 October 2015
- Attack type: Stabbing
- Deaths: Giordana Di Stefano
- Victim: 1
- Perpetrator: Anthony Luca Priolo
- Motive: Jealousy, revenge

The murder of Giordana Di Stefano is a crime that occurred on 7 October 2015 in Nicolosi, Catania in Sicily, Italy. Giordana Di Stefano, a young mother was killed by Antonio Luca Priolo, her ex-boyfriend and the father of her child. The story attracted the attention of the media and sparked a public debate on the issue of violence against women.

== Background ==
Giordana Di Stefano was born in Catania on 6 May 1995, daughter of Vera Squatrito and Maurizio Di Stefano, and younger sister of Erika. She was raised in Nicolosi, and developed an interest in dance from an early age, practicing flamenco since the age of 13. In addition to dance, Giordana was interested in education and chose to study social science. In 2010, Giordana met Antonio Luca Priolo, four years her senior, with whom she began a relationship. After a few months, Giordana discovered she was pregnant and decided to continue the pregnancy, supported by her family.

At first, Priolo distanced himself from Giordana and left Italy but, in 2015, Priolo returned to his ex-girlfriend threatening her to withdraw the complaint for stalking. On the night between 6 and 7 October, Priolo attacked Giordana, fatally stabbing her with 48 stab wounds. The victim bled to death, a few steps away from her home.

== Investigations and the trial ==
After the murder, Priolo attempted to escape, heading towards Milan with the intention of taking refuge abroad, but was arrested by the police. Priolo was later tried for femicide. Determined to obtain justice for her daughter, Vera Squatrito, Giordana's mother, started a petition shortly after the tragedy to ask for an appropriate punishment for her daughter's murderer, which collected over 80,000 signatures.

In November 2019, the Court of Cassation confirmed the 30-year prison sentence with an abbreviated trial for Priolo, with the confirmation of the aggravating circumstances of premeditation, cruelty and stalking.

== Social impact and laws introduced ==
The case of Giordana Di Stefano has had a significant impact on Italian policies on gender violence. The tragedy has contributed to increasing social awareness and has influenced the introduction of regulations to protect victims of femicide. In 2018, Law 4 was enacted, which provides support for orphans of femicide, recognizing the right of these orphans to a financial contribution. In this regard, Vera Squatrito stated: There was a great fight to recognize the orphans of femicide together with "Il giardino segreto" of Rome, the association "Io sono Giordana" was an integral part of law four that recognizes a contribution to orphans. Furthermore, in 2019, the Red Code was approved, a law that introduces urgent measures for the protection of victims of violence.

The case of femicide involving Giordana Di Stefano has kept public attention alive over time. The journalist of TG1, Adriana Pannitteri, has dedicated a book to the story, entitled The strength of women.

Furthermore, in 2021 Giordana's story was told in an episode of the programme Amore criminale, hosted by Veronica Pivetti, which helped to further raise public awareness on the topic of gender violence.

== Legacy ==
Vera Squatrito, the victim's mother, became a women's rights activist. She took parental authority of her granddaughter. In 2017, she founded the association "Io sono Giordana" in memory of her daughter, with the aim of promoting a culture of respect and safety for all women. The association is actively involved in awareness-raising activities in schools, institutions and society in general, with the aim of preventing gender-based violence and offering support to victims. Among the main initiatives promoted, the creation of the project "La Casa di Giordy" stands out, a support center for women in difficulty. In addition to keeping the memory of the victim alive, the association is also committed to supporting women and children who are victims of violence, offering them assistance and concrete resources for recovery, raising public awareness on the issue of gender-based violence and promoting a culture of respect and safety for all women, with the aim of preventing violence and building a more just and inclusive society.

== Bibliography ==
- Adriana Pannitteri (2020). La forza delle donne. Perrone. ISBN 978-8860045508.

== See also ==
- Femicide
- Gender and violence
- Murder of Giulia Cecchettin
- Murder of Giulia Tramontano
