= Edoardo Bovolon =

Italian footballer (born 1998)

Personal information
- Date of birth: 5 June 1998 (age 28)
- Place of birth: Udine, Italy
- Height: 1.83 m (6 ft 0 in)
- Position: Midfielder

Team information
- Current team: Chions
- Number: 21

Youth career
- Udinese

Senior career*
Years	Team	Apps	(Gls)
2015–2018	Udinese	0	(0)
2015–2016	→ Pordenone (loan)	1	(0)
2017–2018	→ Como (loan)	34	(2)
2018–2022	Como	86	(1)
2022–2023	San Donato	28	(0)
2023–2024	Sant'Angelo	4	(0)
2024–	Chions	13	(2)
- * Club domestic league appearances and goals as of 10 November 2024

Edoardo Bovolon (born 5 June 1998) is an Italian footballer who plays for Serie D club Chions.

== Club career ==
He made his professional debut in the Lega Pro for Pordenone on 8 May 2016 in a game against Giana Erminio.
