= Buonvicino =

- Comune
- Comune di Buonvicino
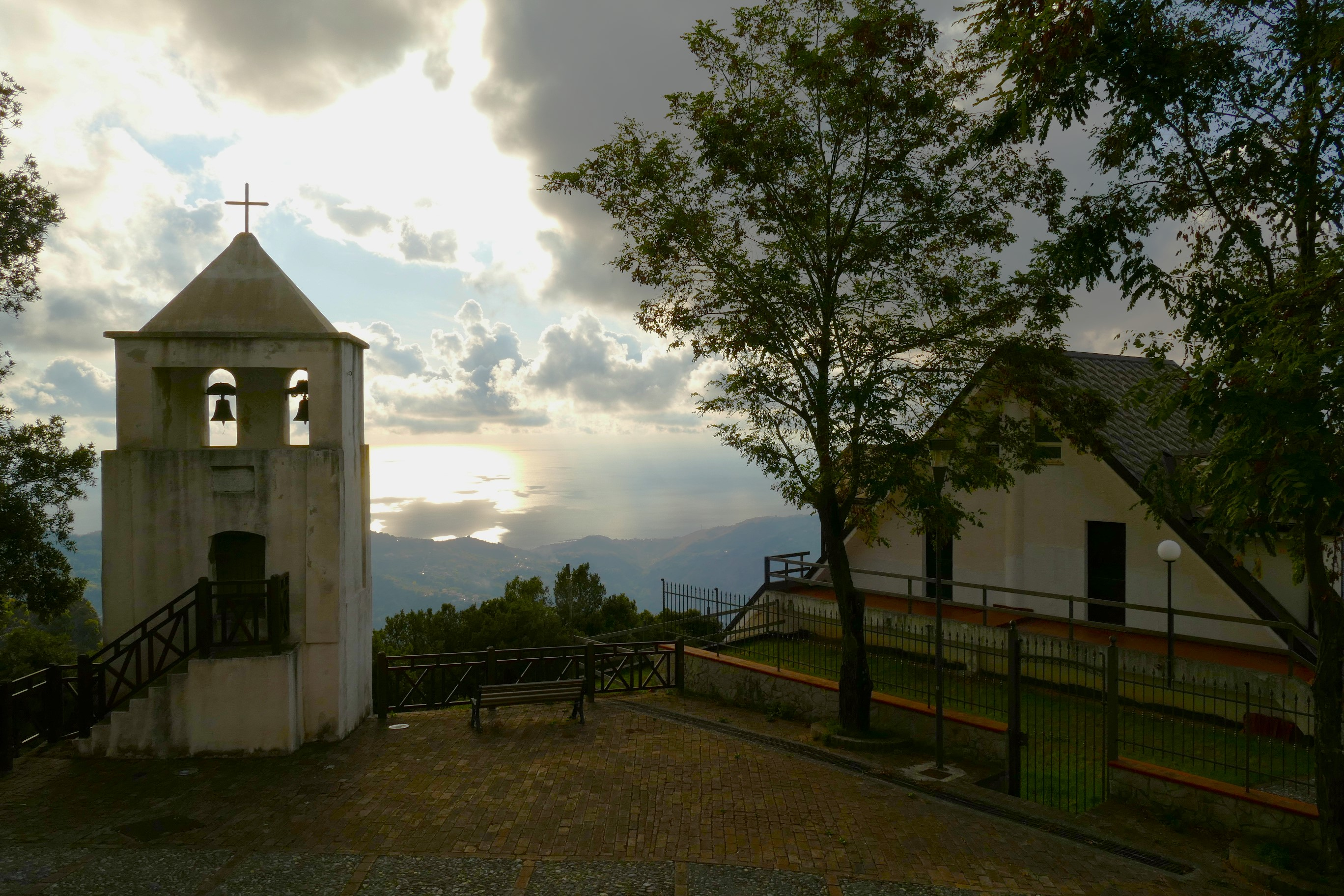

- Location within Italy Location within Calabria
- Coordinates: 39°41′N 15°53′E
- Country: Italy
- Region: Calabria
- Province: Cosenza (CS)

Government
  - Mayor: Angelina Barbiero

Area
  - Total: 55 km^{2} (21 sq mi)
- Elevation: 400 m (1,300 ft)

Population (31 December 2018)
  - Total: 2,186
  - Density: 40/km^{2} (100/sq mi)
- Demonym: Buonvicinesi
- Time zone: UTC+1 (CET)
  - Summer (DST): UTC+2 (CEST)
- Postal code: 87020
- Dialing code: 0985
- ISTAT code: 078020
- Patron saint: St. Cyriacus
- Saint day: 19 September
- Website: Official website

Buonvicino (Calabrian: Vommicìnu) is a town and comune in the province of Cosenza in the Calabria region of southern Italy. It is one of I Borghi più belli d'Italia ("The most beautiful villages of Italy").

== History ==
In 1996, the town was known for the Buonvicino massacre.
