= Elia Galligani =

Italian footballer (born 1992)

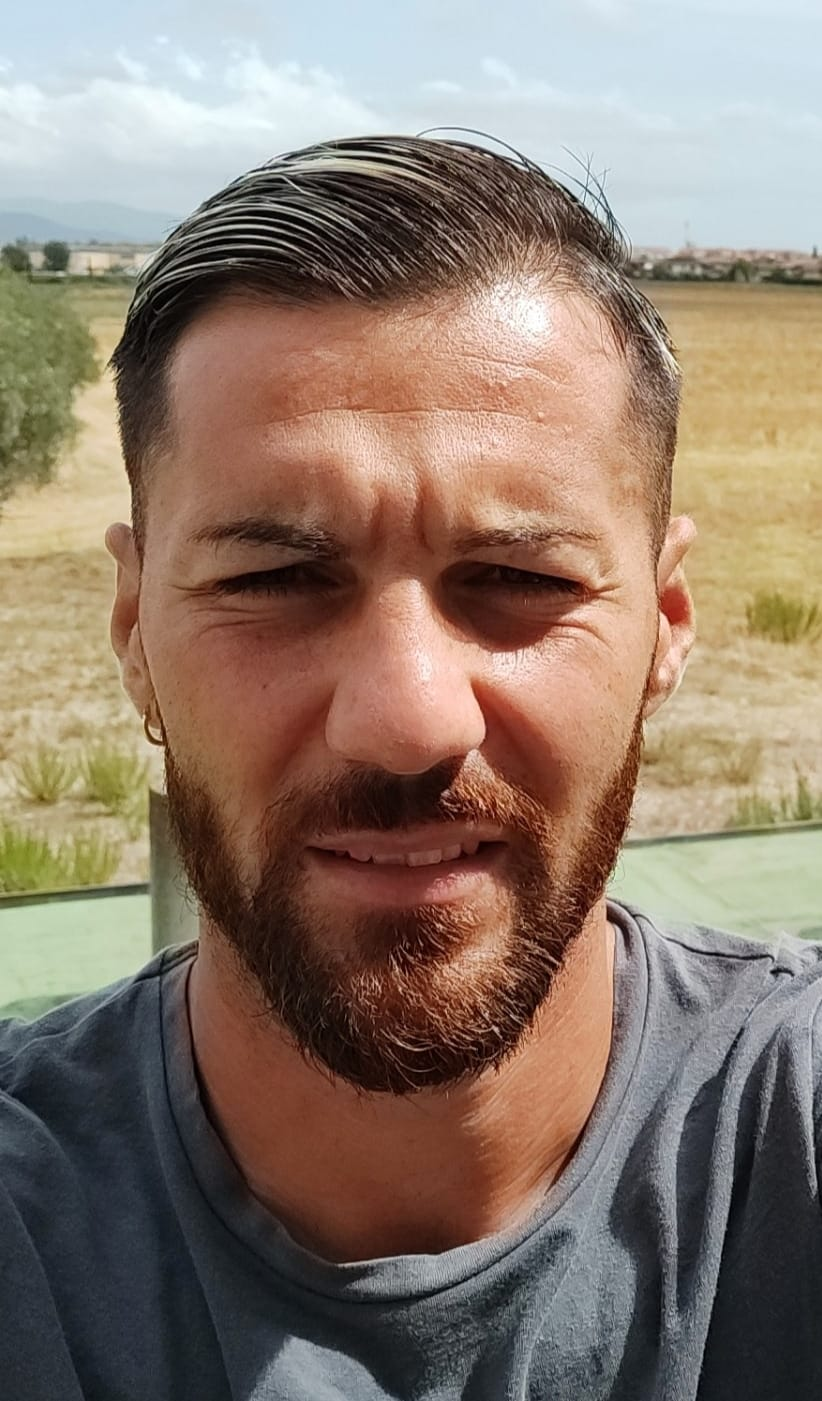

Personal information
- Date of birth: 8 June 1992 (age 34)
- Place of birth: Viareggio (Lucca, Italia)
- Height: 1.74 m (5 ft 9 in)
- Position: Striker

Team information
- Current team: Sangiovannese 1927
- Number: 11

Youth career
- Lucchese

Senior career*
Years	Team	Apps	(Gls)
2010–2011	Lammari	20	(1)
2012-2013	Fortis Lucchese	55	(6)
2014	Cenaia	15	(5)
2014/2015	Larcianese	16	(3)
2015	Real Forte Dei Marmi-Querceta	15	(3)
2015–2016	Lavagnese	21	(2)
2016–2017	Juventus Domo	25	(10)
2017–2018	Viareggio	36	(8)
2018–2019	San Donato Tavarnelle	36	(9)
2019–2021	Grosseto	59	(20)
2021–2022	Carrarese	15	(2)
2022	Mantova	9	(0)
2022–2023	San Donato Tavarnelle	33	(3)
2023–2025	Siena Football Club	62	(24)
2025–2026	Viareggio Calcio	27	(7)
- * Club domestic league appearances and goals as of 16 April 2022

Elia Galligani (born 8 June 1992) is an Italian footballer who played professionally in Serie C and in the Kings League competition, he plays for Sangiovannese 1927

== Club career ==
Elia Galligani was born in Viareggio on 8 June 1992 in Lucca, Tuscany, Italy. He made his debut with goals among professionals on 27 September 2020 at the age of 28.

He started playing at the age of 5 in the National Center, for the youth sector of his city.

He went to the youth academy of Lucchese at the age of 14.

His first season among the greats arrives at the age of 17 in the Tuscan championship of excellence and for five years he toured various teams in the region.

At the age of 23 he made his debut in Serie D with the Lavagnese team where he collected 21 appearances with 2 goals and 4 assists.

The following year he moved to Juventus Domo, in the Piedmontese championship, where he scored 10 goals in 25 appearances from the right wing.

He returns to Serie D the following year in the jersey of his hometown Viareggio. Concluding the year with 36 appearances, 8 goals and 7 assists.

In the 2018–2019 season he wears the San Donato Tavarnelle shirt, collecting 9 goals and 9 assists in 36 appearances.

The 2019–2020 season he plays with the Grosseto, concluding with 25 appearances, 9 goals and 3 assists and the victory of the Serie D championship which stopped first due to covid.

Reconfirmed in 2020–2021 with Grosseto in Serie C, he finished the season with 11 goals and 7 assists in 36 appearances.

To Conclude the season Grosseto has earned a chance in the playoffs which have started with a first game win where Elia contributed an assist.

On 15 July 2021, he signed a one-year contract with Carrarese.

On 13 January 2022, he moved to Mantova.

On 13 July 2022, he joined to San Donato.

On season 2023/2024 he joined to Siena FC
