= List of Italian films of 1999 =

A list of films produced in Italy in 1999 (see 1999 in film):

Title	Director	Cast	Genre	Notes
1999
Branchie	Francesco Ranieri Martinotti	Gianluca Grignani, Valentina Cervi	Romance	
But Forever in My Mind (Come te nessuno mai)	Gabriele Muccino	Silvio Muccino, Anna Galiena, Diane Fleri	Comedy	
Il cielo in una stanza	Carlo Vanzina	Elio Germano, Ricky Tognazzi	Comedy	
Il corpo dell'anima	Mario Monicelli	Roberto Herlitzka, Raffaella Ponzo, Ennio Fantastichini	erotic drama	
Deceit	Claudia Florio	Jonathan Pryce, Susan Lynch, Claudia Gerini	mystery	
Dirty Linen	Mario Monicelli	Gigi Proietti, Mariangela Melato, Ornella Muti	comedy	Entered into the 21st Moscow International Film Festival
Il dolce rumore della vita	Giuseppe Bertolucci	Francesca Neri, Rade Šerbedžija, Alida Valli	drama	
Esther	Raffaele Mertes	Louise Lombard, F. Murray Abraham, Ornella Muti	religious	
Europe vs. Italy	Bruno Bozzetto	Pietro Ghislandi	Animation/ Behavior	Created on computer, edited by Ugo Micheli
Fantozzi 2000 – La clonazione	Domenico Saverni	Paolo Villaggio, Milena Vukotic, Anna Mazzamauro	comedy	
Ferdinando and Carolina	Lina Wertmüller	Sergio Assisi, Gabriella Pession, Nicole Grimaudo	comedy	
Guardami	Davide Ferrario	Elisabetta Cavallotti, Flavio Insinna	drama	
In the Beginning There Was Underwear	Anna Negri	Teresa Saponangelo, Stefania Rocca	Comedy	
Kisses and Hugs	Paolo Virzì	Francesco Paolantoni, Paola Tiziana Cruciani	Comedy	
The Legend of the Titanic	Orlando Corradi, Kim J. Ok	Gregory Snegoff	animation	
Libero Burro	Sergio Castellitto	Sergio Castellitto, Margaret Mazzantini, Michel Piccoli	comedy	
Li chiamarono... briganti!	Pasquale Squitieri	Enrico Lo Verso, Claudia Cardinale, Franco Nero	historical drama	
The Lost Lover	Roberto Faenza	Ciarán Hinds, Juliet Aubrey	drama	
A Love	Gianluca Maria Tavarelli	Fabrizio Gifuni, Lorenza Indovina	Romance	
Love in the Mirror (Amor nello specchio)	Salvatore Maira	Anna Galiena, Peter Stormare	Drama	
Luchino Visconti	Carlo Lizzani	Claudia Cardinale	Documentary	
Lucignolo	Massimo Ceccherini	Massimo Ceccherini, Alessandro Paci, Claudia Gerini, Tinto Brass	comedy	
The Man-Eater	Aurelio Grimaldi	Loredana Cannata	erotic	
Milonga	Emidio Greco	Giancarlo Giannini, Claudia Pandolfi	Giallo	
My Voyage to Italy	Martin Scorsese	Martin Scorsese	Documentary	
The Nanny	Marco Bellocchio	Fabrizio Bentivoglio, Valeria Bruni Tedeschi, Maya Sansa	drama	Entered into the 1999 Cannes Film Festival
Not of This World (Fuori dal mondo)	Giuseppe Piccioni	Margherita Buy, Silvio Orlando, Carolina Freschi	Drama	5 David di Donatello
Outlaw	Enzo Monteleone	Stefano Accorsi, Emilio Solfrizzi, Antonio Catania	crime	Entered into the 21st Moscow International Film Festival
Il pesce innamorato	Giovanni Veronesi	Leonardo Pieraccioni, Yamila Diaz-Rahi	Comedy	
A Respectable Man	Maurizio Zaccaro	Michele Placido, Stefano Accorsi, Giovanna Mezzogiorno, Mariangela Melato	Drama	
Screw Loose	Ezio Greggio	Ezio Greggio, Mel Brooks	Comedy	
Sicilia!	Danièle Huillet, Jean-Marie Straub	Gianni Buscarino	drama	Screened at the 1999 Cannes Film Festival
Tea with Mussolini	Franco Zeffirelli	Joan Plowright, Cher, Judi Dench, Maggie Smith, Lily Tomlin	Drama	Zeffirelli's semiautobiographical film about his life during WWII. Spoken in English
Tifosi	Neri Parenti	Massimo Boldi, Christian De Sica, Diego Abatantuono	Comedy	
Tutti gli uomini del deficiente	Paolo Costella	Claudia Gerini, Arnoldo Foà, Luciana Littizzetto	Comedy	
Uninvited	Carlo Gabriel Nero	Vanessa Redgrave, Franco Nero, Eli Wallach, Adam Hann-Byrd	thriller	

== See also ==
- 1999 in Italy
- 1994 in Italian television
