= Murder of Giulia Tramontano =

2023 murder in Italy

- Location: 14/a Via Agostino Novella, Senago, Italy
- Date: May 27, 2023; 7:00 pm – 8:00 pm
- Attack type: Stabbing
- Weapon: Knife
- Deaths: Giulia Tramontano and her unborn baby
- Victims: 2 (the victim was pregnant)
- Perpetrator: Alessandro Impagnatiello

Giulia Tramontano (2 May 1994 – 27 May 2023) was an Italian real estate agent who was murdered on 27 May 2023 by her boyfriend, Alessandro Impagnatiello, 30 in Senago, Metropolitian City of Milan, Italy.

Impagnatiello was taken for questioning and after interrogation, confessed to murdering Tramontano by stabbing her several times in the neck. After murdering her, he placed her body in Via Monte Rosa. He was sentenced to life imprisonment in November 2024.

Together with the murder of Giulia Cecchettin in November 2023, the murders sparked the debate on femicides, violence against women and gender violence in Italy.

== Murder ==
On 28 May 2023, Giulia Tramontano (born 2 May 1994), seven months pregnant, was reported missing. Born in Naples, she worked as a real estate agent in Senago, a town where she had moved five years earlier from Sant'Antimo, to move in with her boyfriend Alessandro Impagnatiello (born 26 March 1993).

Impagnetiello had reported the disappearance to the police. Aged 30, he worked as a barman in a luxury hotel in Milan and has a six-year-old son from a previous relationship.

Her relatives maintained from the beginning that it was not a case of voluntary disappearance, so much so that Chiara Tramontano, Giulia's sister, on the same evening of May 28, contacted the editorial staff of the television programme Chi l'ha visto?, after her sister's phone was no longer available. The last contact dates back to 9.43 pm on Saturday May 27, when Tramontano, via message, said goodbye to her mother, telling her that she was going to rest.

Tramontano's mobile phone was no longer active after the late evening of May 27. Impagnatiello, for his part, went to report his girlfriend's disappearance on the afternoon of 28 May after going to work. Impagnatiello initially declared that he had seen Tramontano for the last time that Sunday morning on the bed in her pyjamas when he was leaving the house to go to work, but already, at the time of reporting his story was not very credible; Impagnatiello, moreover, provided the police with a non-existent address at which to look for his girlfriend.

The investigations revealed that the Tramontano had recently discovered that her boyfriend was leading a double love life, as he was having a clandestine relationship with an Italian-English colleague, who had previously become pregnant but undergone an abortion.

Biological traces belonging to Tramontano were found in Impagnatiello's car, and as a result he was officially investigated for murder. It was also discovered that with his colleague and lover (whose identity was initially not revealed to the mass media) Impagnatiello had always spoken of Tramontano in a denigrating and belittling manner, even saying she had a mental disorder.

Between May 31 and June 1, Impagnatiello claimed to be responsible for Tramontano's death and provided investigators with instructions to help them find her body. Tramontano was found to have been killed by stabbing inside the home where the couple lived together. Impagnatiello also made two attempts to burn her body: the first in the bathtub at home using denatured ethanol, the second outside the apartment with gasoline. Impagnatiello was then charged with aggravated homicide, non-consensual termination of pregnancy, and concealment of a corpse. From the analyses carried out on his phone, it also emerged that Impagnatiello had carried out web searches relating to how to dispose of a body and how to erase traces of blood.

After Tramontano was killed, her phone and documents were thrown into a manhole. Before getting rid of the aforementioned phone, Impagnatiello used it with the specific purpose of misleading the investigation.

The autopsy revealed that both Tramontano's blood and the baby she was carrying contained a significant amount of rat poison. It was also found that Impagnatiello, in the months leading up to the murder, had been searching the web about "how much rat poison was needed to kill a person", "how to administer the poison", and "how long it would take for it to take effect".

Tramontano had complained to her friends that she was having terrible stomach pains and felt like she had been drugged, but she had not suspected her boyfriend. The autopsy also revealed that she was initially stabbed in the back and then stabbed in various areas of her neck. In total, she had been stabbed 37 times, none of which were in a vital area. Tramontano then died of blood loss, a detail that triggered the aggravating circumstance of cruelty, together with that of premeditation, due to the poison being administered constantly for months.

== Media reactions ==
The crime has aroused considerable outrage and indignation from the press, television commentators and editorialists. It has been highlighted that the problem of femicide is only the tip of the iceberg, as women endure abuse and oppression every day. The way in which the story has been treated has aroused negative criticism from representatives of the feminist movement, in particular regarding some stereotypical narratives that would limit themselves to labelling the perpetrators of crimes like this as "monsters" or "sick people", instead of recognizing and considering male violence as a systematic phenomenon born of rape culture and patriarchy.

== Trial ==
On January 18, 2024, the first degree trial against Alessandro Impagnatiello began. The first act was the spontaneous declarations of the defendant, who admitted his guilt. The charges were: voluntary homicide aggravated by premeditation, cruelty, futile motives and the bond of cohabitation, non-consensual termination of pregnancy and concealment of a corpse. The judges decided not to accept the request to constitute themselves as civil parties advanced by the municipality of Senago, the Penelope Association and the Polis Association. The only civil party in the trial was therefore the family of the victim Giulia Tramontano.

During the subsequent first-degree hearings, the murderer admitted to having poisoned his victim in the months preceding the murder, but claimed to have done so with the sole purpose of causing her to miscarriage. He then confirmed that he had killed her at home on the evening of May 27, that he had tried to hide her body without success, and that he had gone to his mother's house for lunch with the body in the trunk.

On November 25, 2024, the Corte d'Assise sentenced Alessandro Impagnatiello to life imprisonment and three months of daytime isolation for the murder, by stabbing, of Giulia Tramontano. The sentence also includes a monetary compensation of €200,000 for both parents of Guilia, and €150,000 each for the brother and sister.

== Cultural impact ==
The song Migliore, present in the album Hello World by Pinguini Tattici Nucleari, is dedicated to Giulia Tramontano.

The Municipality of Milan awarded Giulia Tramontano the "Ambrogino d'Oro alla memoria" prize and the Municipality of Senago dedicated the "Per Giulia" programme of events to her.

In Sant'Antimo an anti-violence center was named after Giulia Tramontano and her son Thiago.

== See also ==
- Femicide
- Gender and violence
- List of solved missing person cases (2020s)
- Murder of Giulia Cecchettin
