= Murders of Elisa Marafini and Patrizio Bovi =

1997 double homicide case in Italy

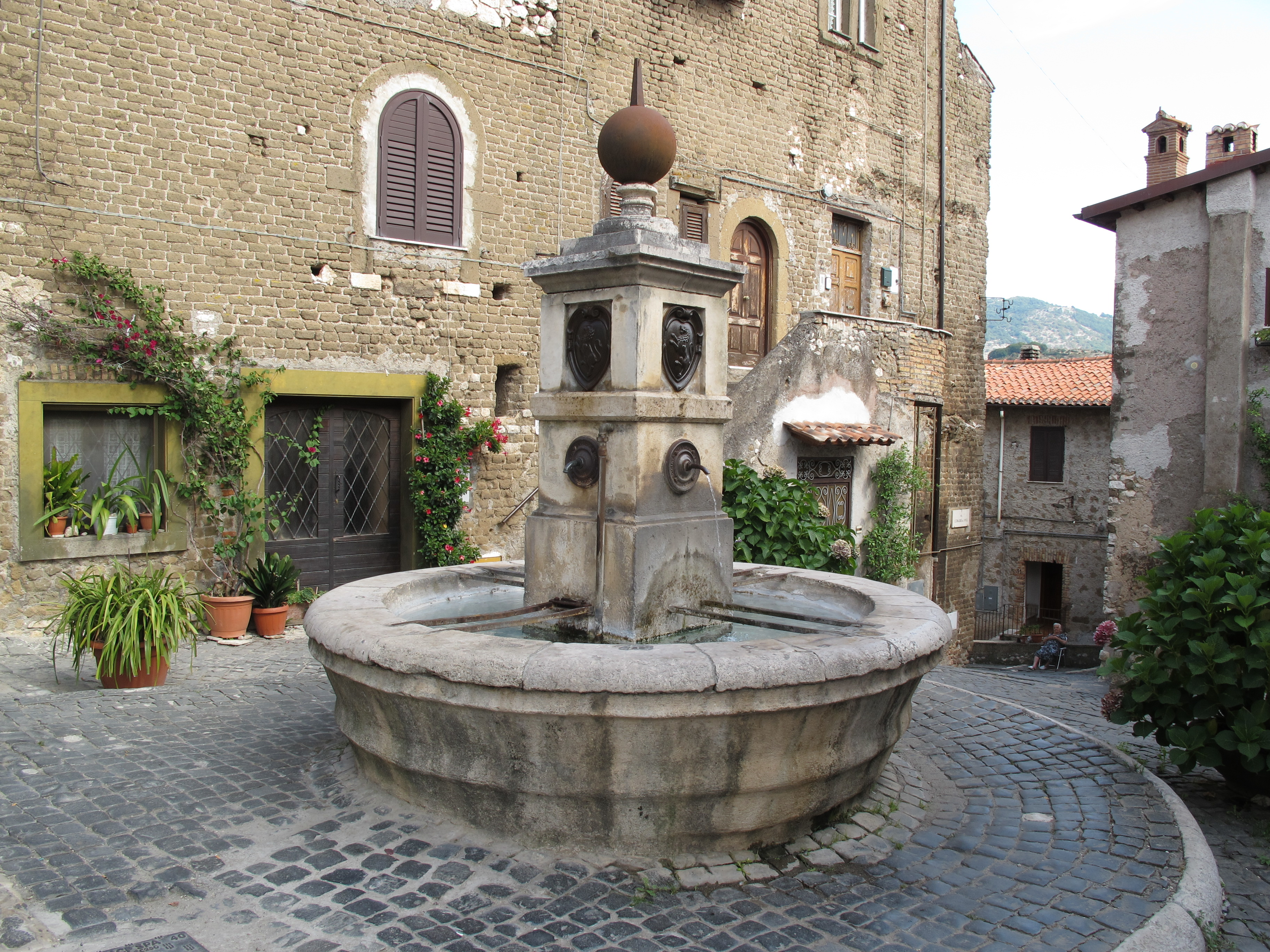
- Old Fountain at Vicolo Fini near Via della Fortuna
- Location: 41 Via della Fortuna, Cori, Lazio, Italy
- Date: 9 March 1997; 8:00 PM – 11:30 PM (CET)
- Attack type: Stabbing
- Deaths: 2
- Victims: Elisa Marafini and Patrizio Bovi
- Perpetrator: Marco Canale

The murders of Elisa Marafini and Patrizio Bovi, known in Italy as delitto di Cori (English: Cori crime), is a case of double homicide that occurred on the evening of Sunday 9 March 1997 in Cori, Latina when two young fiancés were found killed with 175 stab wounds.

In the following months, the crime received widespread media attention, causing a strong emotional impact throughout Italy.

Marco Canale was found guilty of this crime and was sentenced to 30 years in prison in the three levels of trial. He served 22 years before being released.

The story inspired the plot of a novel by Antonio Pennacchi, written in two versions.

== Events ==
In Cori, a small town in the province of Latina, on 9 March 1997, in a house on Via della Fortuna, at number 41, at around 11:30 pm, the bodies of the 23-year-old worker Patrizio Bovi, known as Gianni, a fan of pop music and with a small criminal record for drug dealing, and his girlfriend, the 17-year-old student Elisa Marafini, were found. The bodies were discovered by her 15-year-old brother and her father, Angelo Marafini, a retired Carabinieri marshal together with Massimiliano Placidi, a friend of the victims. The victims had been stabbed to death: 51 stab wounds were inflicted on Patrizio Bovi and 124 on Elisa Marafini. The murder weapon used was a kitchen knife that the Carabinieri found a few days later in the same house, cleaned of fingerprints.

According to the testimony of a Polish family who lived nearby, during the crime, between 8.30pm and 9pm, the murderer had turned up the music on the stereo to full volume so as not to let the victims' screams be heard. The events were believed to have been as follows: after the two victims had dined together on the lower floor of the house, a person arrived who wanted to speak to Patrizio Bovi alone; the two went upstairs and after an argument the murderer stabbed Patrizio repeatedly. Elisa Marafini, who had remained on the lower floor, hearing the commotion amidst the music at full volume, went upstairs and the murderer proceeded to attack her with even greater ferocity.

Patrizio Bovi was a boy originally from Campania who had been adopted by a family from Cisterna di Latina; a few months before his killing he had gone to live alone in Cori Monte, where he had met Elisa Marafini to whom he had become engaged.

In the early afternoon of 9 March 1997, Elisa Marafini left her home in Cori Valle, was seen making a phone call from a public telephone in a bar near her home, then hitchhiking to Ponte della Catena to reach Cori Monte and meet up with Patrizio. That evening she was able to stay beyond the time she was allowed to return (7:30 p.m.) because her family was out of the house, as she confirmed by frequently calling her home with her boyfriend's cell phone and receiving no answers.

Elisa's father, who did not approve of his daughter's love affair, after returning home with his family and having dinner, not seeing her return yet, became alarmed and went to look for her, accompanied by his son. Not finding her around the town of Cori and seeing that nobody answered at Patrizio's house, in Via della Fortuna, he went to Massimiliano Placidi's house, informed by his son that the two were friends and knowing where he lived, but did not find him. Later Elisa's father got a ladder and returned to the property to climb up a window and take a look inside the house. Here he met Massimiliano Placidi who offered to climb up the ladder. Once he had climbed up, Placidi saw from the window the jackets of the two boys inside the house and that Bovi's aquarium was turned off, when it usually remained on. He then broke the glass, entered, and opened the door of the house and let Elisa's father and brother in. On the second floor of the house they found the bodies of Elisa Marafini and Patrizio Bovi in a pool of blood. One was in the bedroom, the other in the bathroom.

== Investigation ==
The police investigating the crime, excluding the hypothesis of murder-suicide by Patrizio Bovi, concentrated on two leads: drug dealing and crime of passion. A few days earlier, 200 grams of cocaine had been sold to Bovi which, if sold at retail, would have brought in 40 million lire.

The attitude of Angelo Marafini, who that night went to put his ladder back in place before going to the barracks for questioning, aroused the suspicions of the investigators.

In particular, seven people were interrogated: in addition to Angelo Marafini, Piero Agnoni, Marco Canale, his brother Massimo, his father Angelo, Massimiliano Placidi and Mauro Meloni who had sold the cocaine to Gianni Bovi. Meloni was arrested for drug dealing, while Angelo and Massimo Canale were reported for illegal possession of weapons. The circle of suspects was further reduced; on the evening of the crime, they had been invited to a party at Patrizio Bovi's house, but they all declined the invitation.

Piero Agnoni had stayed at home with his mother who confirmed the alibi.

Subsequently, the attention of the investigators focused on one of the discoverers of the bodies of the fiancés. Massimiliano Placidi, 28 years old, was an aspiring nurse, whose strong friendship with Patrizio Bovi was determined by the same destiny as an adoptive son. Some red stains were found on his trousers, and he was then arrested and held in prison for 24 days. According to the prosecution, under the effect of drugs, he was seized by a fit of jealousy because he was infatuated with Patrizio Bovi. To confirm this theory there was also a letter from Elisa Marafini who spoke of a jealous friend who stood between her and Patrizio Bovi. Placidi initially confessed, but then denied all charges, claiming that at the time of the crime he was in his study at his home, taking a shower and that he had been forced to confess because he had been subjected to strong psychological pressure and blackmail during the interrogations, even being beaten. Furthermore he justified those hypothetical blood stains on his trousers, stating that it was normal to have stained himself when he found the victims' bodies. However, the red stains on his trousers and on his shower mat, after careful forensic analysis, turned out to be only mould and rust and Placidi was released from prison. At the time of his release Placidi launched accusations against Angelo Marafini and the carabinieri and was sued.

Another friend of the murdered couple, thirty-year-old Marco Canale, a worker from Cisterna, who had lived in the same apartment as the crime moving out months before, had his trousers confiscated the day after the murder, on which blood traces compatible with those of the two victims were found. He was arrested on 26 April 1997. Not even the analysis of the hairs found under the victims' fingernails, compared with the DNA of the suspects, established a culprit with any certainty. The investigators learned that Canale, a few days before the crime, had argued violently with Bovi because he owed him money, perhaps he was an accomplice in drug trafficking and had attended a party at the latter's house. The accused denied all charges against him, claiming that in the early afternoon of March 9 he had been driven by car from Cisterna to Cori by some friends (who left immediately) and that he had not been at Bovi's house, that he had tried several times to call his family members by cell phone, that he had walked down from Cori Monte to Cori Valle shortly after 4:00 pm, that he had reached his grandfather's farm, where he had smoked a joint, that he had hitchhiked at 6:00 pm to return to Cisterna di Latina, to the San Valentino neighborhood; from there he asked for another lift from a couple of acquaintances (who confirmed) to go to his house in the center of Cisterna and arrived there at 6:40 pm. Someone saw Canale at 9:00 pm on the balcony of his house. For the deputy prosecutor Gregorio Capasso, who was leading the investigation, there were sufficient elements to arrest Canale two days after the crime; he was saved by five witnesses, who assured that the two fiancés were alive around 8:00 pm, when Canale had a good alibi: he had been stopped by a patrol of the Carabinieri. His position seemed to become less delicate with the arrest of Placidi, until on 23 April they hypothesized that the stains on his trousers could have been the victims' blood; this was ascertained by the CIS after the analyses and informed the magistrate.

== Trial ==
Surprisingly during the trial, the defendant Marco Canale declared that he had been in the apartment on Via della Fortuna twice in the mid-afternoon of that 9th March: the first time he did not enter, later, finding the door open, he did so and saw Patrizio Bovi and Elisa Marafini already dead, then he ran away without telling anyone, but as many as seven witnesses contradicted this, declaring that they had seen the two victims walking in Piazza Signina in Cori Monte around 7:30 pm. More than a few witnesses also declared that they had seen a man of Marco Canale's height throwing a bag of rubbish into a dumpster near Via della Fortuna on the afternoon of 9 March around 6:20 pm, that is, when the defendant claimed to be in Cisterna. At Patrizio's house the rubbish bin was found without a bag. The backpack Elisa Marafini had on her shoulders was never found again.

Due to the overwhelming evidence (the bloodstains on the trousers and the testimonies) Marco Canale was sentenced at the Corte d'Assise to 30 years of imprisonment in December 1998 with compensation of 250 million lire to the civil party, represented by the family of Elisa Marafini. The sentence was confirmed by the Court of Appeal and the Supreme Court of Cassation. He always proclaimed his innocence.

In 2019, after more than 22 years of imprisonment, Marco Canale was released from prison, thanks to a reduction in his sentence due to a pardon and good behaviour. In March 2024, he was returned to prison on stalking charges.

== Influences in culture ==
In 1998, Antonio Pennacchi wrote the novel Una nuvola rossa, in which he narrated a story inspired by the murder of the Cori sweethearts. In 2018, 20 years later, Pennacchi rewrote the novel, changing the ending, and published it by Mondadori with the new title Il delitto di Agora. Una nuvola rossa.

An entire episode of the second season of Blu notte - Misteri italiani was dedicated to the murders, hosted by Carlo Lucarelli and broadcast for the first time on Rai 3 on 2 June 1999.

== See also ==
- Cori
- Cisterna di Latina
- Traffico di droga
