= Daniele Cardelli =

Italian football player (born 1995)

Personal information
- Date of birth: 16 March 1995 (age 31)
- Place of birth: Pescia, Italy
- Height: 1.80 m (5 ft 11 in)
- Position: Goalkeeper

Team information
- Current team: Pistoiese

Youth career
- –2010: Margine Coperta
- 2010–2011: Borgo a Buggiano
- 2011–2014: Empoli

Senior career*
Years	Team	Apps	(Gls)
2013–2014	Empoli	0	(0)
2013–2014	→ Fortis Juventus (loan)	34	(0)
2014–2016	Pontedera	45	(0)
2016	Latina	0	(0)
2016–2019	Pisa	7	(0)
2017–2018	→ Casertana (loan)	19	(0)
2019	→ Cuneo (loan)	17	(0)
2020	Pontedera	0	(0)
2020–2021	Socc. Borghetto	0	(0)
2021–2023	San Donato	65	(0)
2024–2025	Livorno	21	(0)
2025–2026	Grosseto	2	(0)
2026–	Pistoiese	0	(0)
- * Club domestic league appearances and goals as of 2 May 2026

Daniele Cardelli (born 16 March 1995) is an Italian footballer who plays as a goalkeeper for Serie D club Pistoiese.

== Club career ==
He made his professional debut in the Lega Pro for Pontedera on 20 December 2014 in a game against Carrarese.

On 31 January 2019, he joined Cuneo on loan.

On 3 September 2019, his contract with Pisa was dissolved by mutual consent.

On 21 January 2020 he returned to Pontedera.

On 18 July 2021, he moved to San Donato.
