= Killing of Gianfranco Cuccuini =

1995 unsolved murder case in Italy

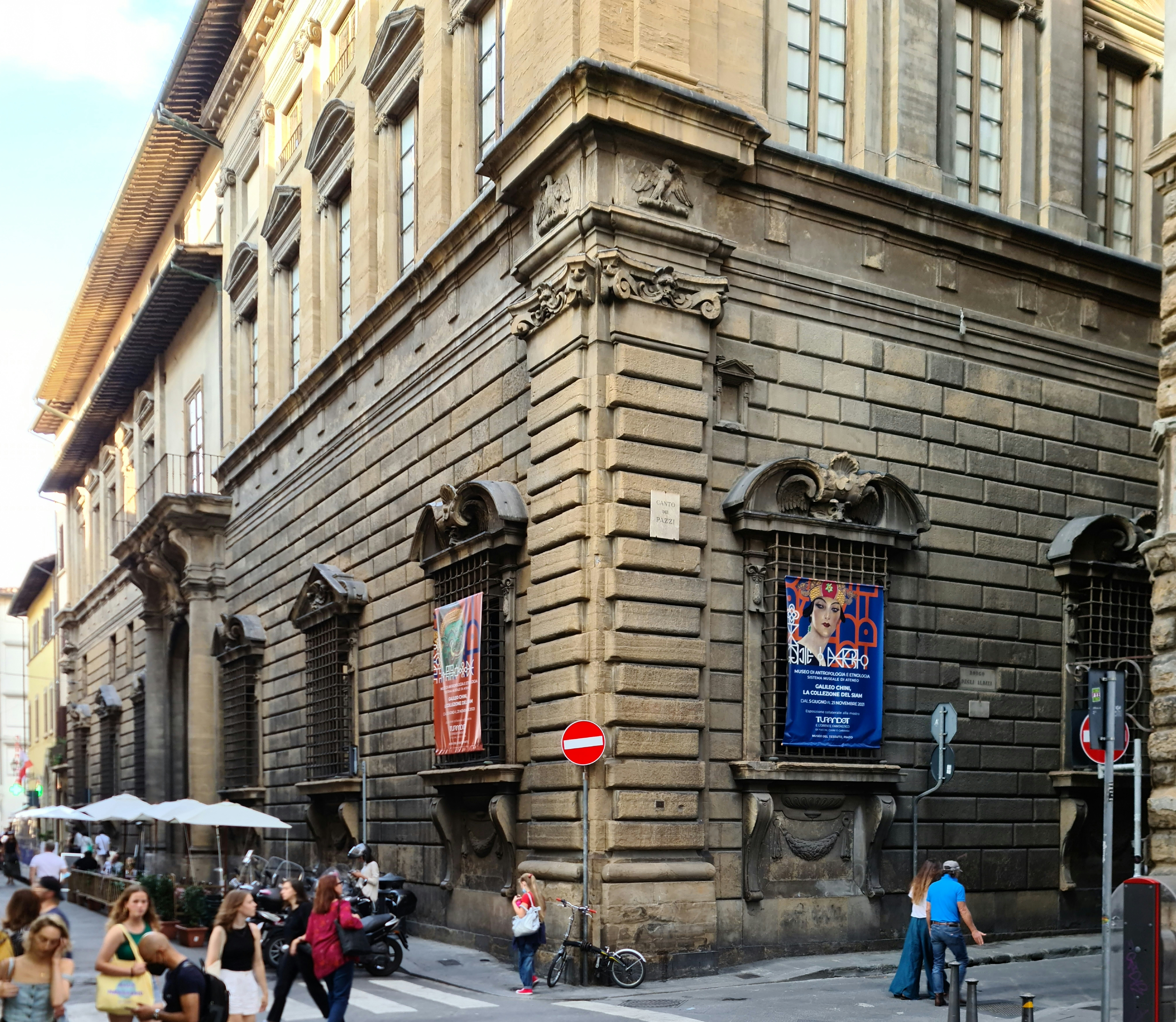
- Via del Proconsolo, Florence
- Location: 7R Via del Proconsolo, Florence
- Date: 24 March 1995, 8:30 AM - 8:45 AM (approximately)
- Attack type: Stabbing
- Weapon: Unknown
- Victim: 1
- Assailant: Unknown
- Motive: Unknown

The killing of Gianfranco Cuccuini occurred in Florence, Italy on the morning of 24 March 1995. The victim, the sixty-five year old pensioner Gianfranco Cuccuini, was killed inside a bookshop specializing in religious books and articles in Via del Proconsolo where he occasionally worked. The perpetrator or perpetrators responsible have never been identified.

== Crime ==
=== Gianfranco Cuccuini ===
Gianfranco Cuccuini, who was married with two children, was a former art printer living in Sesto Fiorentino. His father died a few months after Gianfranco's birth, and his mother sent him to boarding school, where Gianfranco learned the typographer's trade. At sixteen, he joined the "Il Torchio" printing shop in Florence; he remained there for forty years, before retiring in 1990. After retiring, his nephew put him in touch with the owner of the Manuelli bookshop, which sold religious articles and books, and Gianfranco began working part-time at the shop. Four days before he was murdered, he had just returned from a short ski trip to Madonna di Campiglio, which he had spent with some friends.

=== Discovery ===
At 8:45 a.m. on Friday, 24 March 1995, the priest Don Sergio Boffici went to the Curia Fiesolana building to pick up some hosts to be consecrated for Mass at the parish of Castelfranco. He knocked several times on the back door that led to the Manuelli bookshop, but received no answer. He instead passed through the courtyard, and once inside, he saw what appeared to be the body of a man lying on the floor at the end of the counter. Frightened, Don Boffici went out into the street to call for help and met another priest, Don Giuseppe Saccardi, who accompanied Don Boffici into the shop to find out what had happened. There, the body of Gianfranco Cuccuini was found, lying on the floor in a pool of blood. The autopsy revealed that Cuccuini had been killed with twenty-seven stab wounds, inflicted with unprecedented violence on multiple parts of his body. There were no signs of a struggle on his arms, which is why it was believed he had been victim of a surprise attack and he had no time to defend himself. The murder weapon was never found, but it was hypothesized that it could have been a pair of scissors or a paper knife given the type of wounds, inflicted by a single-edged blade.

== Investigations ==
The possibility of a robbery gone wrong was immediately ruled out, as the violence with which Cuccuini had been attacked was highly unusual for a thief, and nothing had been stolen from the cash register. The time of death was placed between 8:30 and 8:45 that morning, since Cuccuini had last been seen alive by passers-by at 8:30, and his body was found inside the bookstore at 8:45. Investigators analysed the profiles of the Manuelli bookstore's typical customers, discovering that they were mainly religious people and clerics, but also included fanatics and those with unusual requests. This lead was given importance as in the days preceding the murder, Cuccuini himself had confided to his wife his doubts about possible black masses being performed by these customers. The theory that the crime was committed by a deranged man in a fit of rage was immediately pursued by investigators. Several witnesses claimed to have seen, around the time of the crime, a woman pacing in front of the Manuelli bookshop with her hands clasped. The woman was identified and questioned, and among her personal belongings was discovered a freshly bloodstained umbrella. However, forensic analysis later revealed that the blood traces did not belong to Gianfranco Cuccuini and were likely instead the result of a minor accident involving the woman. Her case was immediately dismissed, as she also had a solid alibi.

At the crime scene, a notebook was found on which three apparently nonsensical words had been written, namely "Uma harum uma ". Linguistic and cryptographic tests conducted by the Bologna forensic police were unable to give a meaning to the sequence of words, so the investigators searched on the Internet for all three word combinations (uma harum, uma uma and harum) that could be derived from the short text and discovered that, in Indonesia, Uma is the name of a deity worshipped on the island of Bali. Harum, on the other hand, is the spring temple in the Bangli Regency, also in the province of Bali, while "Uma uma" turned out to be an expression often used in sexually explicit films on Thai erotic sites.

Analysis of Cuccuini's private life revealed that on the morning of 24 March 1995, he shouldn't even have been at work, since his working days at the Manuelli store were Tuesdays, Wednesdays, and Thursdays. However, that Friday, he had agreed to stand in for the shop-owner because he had to take his daughter to the eye doctor. Also curiously, he had opened the shop earlier than the usual time. Therefore, the killer must have known Gianfranco well enough to know he was at the shop alone on that day and at that particular time. A witness also said that at 8:30 that Friday, she had seen a man matching Cuccuini's description enter the Manuelli store, along with another person with long hair, with uncertain gender. This individual, who has never been identified, was likely the killer of Gianfranco Cuccuini. The crime scene revealed neither blood spatters on the walls nor the killer's fingerprints, but a single drop of blood was found on a wooden chair near Cuccuini's body. Items found near the victim's body included his glasses, a bunch of keys and a mop. The coroner estimated that the first blow was delivered very violently, and had been inflicted from left to right and from top to bottom to Cuccuini's back. It was considered probable that the first blow had been inflicted to the victim's back while he was sitting on the wooden chair and leaning forward towards the aggressor, leaning forward perhaps to pick up the bunch of keys. The drop of blood on the chair, instead, would have fallen from the dripping blade of the killer who immediately afterwards stabbed Cuccuini on the ground another twenty-six times, which would explain the absence of fingerprints and blood splatter in the shop.

Investigations into the running of the shop ultimately revealed that the killer's only escape route was the bookstore's main entrance, since the side entrance was locked from the inside. In any case, the attacker could not have escaped through there, as Don Boffici had repeatedly knocked on that door around 8:45 a.m., immediately after the murder. Despite several years of investigation, the person responsible for Cuccuini's death was never caught, and the crime remains unsolved to this day.

== Cultural influence ==
The murder of Gianfranco Cuccuini was discussed in the fifth episode of the second season of Blu notte - Misteri italiani, hosted by Carlo Lucarelli.
