= 1995 Italian referendum =

A twelve-part abrogative referendum was held in Italy on 11 June 1995. Voters were asked whether they approved of the repealing (or partial repealing) of laws on union representation, union dues, collective contracts for public sector workers, internal exile for mafia members, public ownership of RAI, concessions for television channels, advertising breaks during films, television publicity, commercial licensing, local council elections and shopping hours. Turnout surpassed the required 50% for the referendum to be considered valid. Only five of the twelve proposals were passed.

== Results ==
=== Repealing of the law on union representation ===
Choice	Votes	%
Yes	12,291,330	49.97
✗ No	12,305,693	50.03
Invalid/blank votes	3,133,201	–
Total	27,730,224	100
Registered voters/turnout	48,458,754	57.2
Source: Nohlen & Stöver

=== Partial repealing of the law on union representation ===
Choice	Votes	%
✓ Yes	15,097,799	62.1
No	9,197,089	37.9
Invalid/blank votes	3,407,451	–
Total	27,702,339	100
Registered voters/turnout	48,458,754	57.2
Source: Nohlen & Stöver

=== Repealing of the law on the direct deduction of union dues from employees' salaries ===
Choice	Votes	%
✓ Yes	13,945,919	56.2
No	10,850,793	43.8
Invalid/blank votes	2,956,754	–
Total	27,753,466	100
Registered voters/turnout	48,458,754	57.2
Source: Nohlen & Stöver

=== Repealing of the law on collective contracts for public sector workers ===
Choice	Votes	%
✓ Yes	15,676,385	64.7
No	8,562,040	35.3
Invalid/blank votes	3,557,039	–
Total	27,795,464	100
Registered voters/turnout	48,458,754	57.3
Source: Nohlen & Stöver

=== Repealing of the law on the internal exile of mafia members ===
Choice	Votes	%
✓ Yes	15,373,288	63.7
No	8,768,941	36.3
Invalid/blank votes	3,598,554	–
Total	27,740,783	100
Registered voters/turnout	48,458,754	57.3
Source: Nohlen & Stöver

=== Repealing of the law on public ownership of RAI ===
If approved, this proposal would allow for the partial privatisation of RAI.

Choice	Votes	%
✓ Yes	13,736,435	54.9
No	11,286,527	45.1
Invalid/blank votes	2,784,234	–
Total	27,807,196	100
Registered voters/turnout	48,458,754	57.4
Source: Nohlen & Stöver

=== Repealing of the law regulating commercial licences ===
This proposal would limit ownership of television channels to one per person. This was denounced by Silvio Berlusconi (who owned three channels) as a "post-Communist plot".

Choice	Votes	%
Yes	8,741,584	35.6
✗ No	15,792,453	64.4
Invalid/blank votes	3,205,425	–
Total	27,739,462	100
Registered voters/turnout	48,458,754	57.2
Source: Nohlen & Stöver

=== Repealing of the law on television channel concessions ===
Choice	Votes	%
Yes	11,620,613	43.1
✗ No	15,357,997	56.9
Invalid/blank votes	1,155,336	–
Total	28,133,946	100
Registered voters/turnout	48,458,754	58.1
Source: Nohlen & Stöver

=== Repealing of the law allowing advertising breaks during films ===
This proposal would have restricted advertising breaks during the screening of films on television.

Choice	Votes	%
Yes	11,985,670	44.3
✗ No	15,044,535	55.7
Invalid/blank votes	1,133,873	–
Total	28,164,078	100
Registered voters/turnout	48,458,754	58.1
Source: Nohlen & Stöver

=== Repealing of the law allowing television publicity grouping ===
This proposal would restrict advertising agencies to controlling the advertising of just two channels. This would stop Publitalia from selling advertising space in all three channels owned by Berlusconi.

Choice	Votes	%
Yes	11,713,935	43.6
✗ No	15,161,934	56.4
Invalid/blank votes	1,263,443	–
Total	28,139,312	100
Registered voters/turnout	48,458,754	58.1
Source: Nohlen & Stöver

=== Repealing of the law on shop opening hours ===
Choice	Votes	%
Yes	9,348,000	37.4
✗ No	15,646,779	62.6
Invalid/blank votes	2,793,868	–
Total	27,788,647	100
Registered voters/turnout	48,458,754	57.3
Source: Nohlen & Stöver

=== Repealing of the law on local council elections ===
Choice	Votes	%
Yes	12,154,969	49.4
✗ No	12,452,250	50.6
Invalid/blank votes	3,207,183	–
Total	27,814,402	100
Registered voters/turnout	48,458,754	57.4
Source: Nohlen & Stöver
