= 1996 Torneo di Viareggio =

1996 Torneo Mondiale di Calcio Coppa Carnevale
48° Torneo di Viareggio

Tournament details
- Host country: Italy
- City: Viareggio
- Dates: February 4, 1996 - February 19, 1996
- Teams: 24

Final positions
- Champions: (Italy) Bari
- Runners-up: (Italy) Torino
- Third place: (Italy) Cremonese
- Fourth place: (Italy) Napoli

Tournament statistics
- Matches played: 50
- Goals scored: 123 (2.46 per match)

The 1996 winners of the Torneo di Viareggio (in English, the Viareggio Tournament, officially the Viareggio Cup World Football Tournament Coppa Carnevale), the annual youth football tournament held in Viareggio, Tuscany, are listed below.

== Format ==
The 24 teams are seeded in 6 groups. Each team from a group meets the others in a single tie. The winning club and runners-up from each group progress to the second round. In the second round teams are split up in two groups and meet in a single tie (with penalties after regular time). Winners progress to the final knockout stage, along with the best losing club. The final round matches include 30 minutes extra time and penalties to be played if the draw between teams still holds. Semifinal losing teams play 3rd-place final with penalties after regular time. The winning sides play the final with extra time and repeat the match if the draw holds.

== Participating teams ==
Italian teams

- (Italy) Atalanta
- (Italy) Bari
- (Italy) Brescia
- (Italy) Cagliari
- (Italy) Cesena
- (Italy) Cosenza
- (Italy) Fiorentina
- (Italy) Inter Milan
- (Italy) Juventus
- (Italy) Lazio
- (Italy) Napoli
- (Italy) Nola
- (Italy) Padova
- (Italy) Palermo
- (Italy) Parma
- (Italy) Roma
- (Italy) Torino

European teams

- (Czech Republic) Slavia Prague
- (Germany) Bayern München
- (Ukraine) Dynamo Kyiv
- (Switzerland) Monthey

American teams

- (Mexico) Pumas
- (Uruguay) Nacional Montevideo

Oceanian teams

- (Australia) Marconi Stallions

== Group stage ==
=== Group 1 ===
| Team | Pts | Pld | W | D | L | GF | GA | GD |
|---|---|---|---|---|---|---|---|---|
| (Italy) Torino | 7 | 3 | 2 | 1 | 0 | 6 | 4 | +2 |
| (Italy) Cagliari | 5 | 3 | 1 | 2 | 0 | 5 | 4 | +1 |
| (Italy) Padova | 4 | 3 | 1 | 1 | 1 | 3 | 3 | 0 |
| (Germany) Bayern München | 0 | 3 | 0 | 0 | 3 | 2 | 5 | -3 |

=== Group 2 ===
| Team | Pts | Pld | W | D | L | GF | GA | GD |
|---|---|---|---|---|---|---|---|---|
| (Italy) Fiorentina | 9 | 3 | 3 | 0 | 0 | 5 | 0 | +5 |
| (Italy) Parma | 6 | 3 | 2 | 0 | 1 | 4 | 1 | +3 |
| (Ukraine) Dynamo Kyiv | 1 | 3 | 0 | 1 | 2 | 1 | 5 | -4 |
| (Italy) Nola | 1 | 3 | 0 | 1 | 2 | 1 | 5 | -4 |

=== Group 3 ===
| Team | Pts | Pld | W | D | L | GF | GA | GD |
|---|---|---|---|---|---|---|---|---|
| (Italy) Lazio | 7 | 3 | 2 | 1 | 0 | 5 | 1 | +4 |
| (Italy) Cosenza | 6 | 3 | 2 | 0 | 1 | 5 | 3 | +2 |
| (Italy) Inter Milan | 4 | 3 | 1 | 1 | 1 | 3 | 6 | -3 |
| (Uruguay) Nacional Montevideo | 0 | 3 | 0 | 0 | 3 | 1 | 4 | -3 |

=== Group 4 ===
| Team | Pts | Pld | W | D | L | GF | GA | GD |
|---|---|---|---|---|---|---|---|---|
| (Italy) Cesena | 5 | 3 | 1 | 2 | 0 | 6 | 3 | +3 |
| (Italy) Palermo | 5 | 3 | 1 | 2 | 0 | 6 | 3 | +3 |
| (Italy) Roma | 5 | 3 | 1 | 2 | 0 | 5 | 4 | +1 |
| (Australia) Marconi Stallions | 0 | 3 | 0 | 0 | 3 | 2 | 9 | -7 |

=== Group 5 ===
| Team | Pts | Pld | W | D | L | GF | GA | GD |
|---|---|---|---|---|---|---|---|---|
| (Italy) Juventus | 9 | 3 | 3 | 0 | 0 | 9 | 0 | +9 |
| (Italy) Bari | 6 | 3 | 2 | 0 | 1 | 7 | 1 | +6 |
| (Czech Republic) Slavia Prague | 3 | 3 | 1 | 0 | 2 | 3 | 5 | -2 |
| (Switzerland) Monthey | 0 | 3 | 0 | 0 | 3 | 1 | 14 | -13 |

=== Group 6 ===
| Team | Pts | Pld | W | D | L | GF | GA | GD |
|---|---|---|---|---|---|---|---|---|
| (Italy) Brescia | 6 | 3 | 2 | 0 | 1 | 3 | 2 | +1 |
| (Italy) Atalanta | 5 | 3 | 1 | 2 | 0 | 5 | 2 | +3 |
| (Italy) Napoli | 4 | 3 | 1 | 1 | 1 | 2 | 2 | 0 |
| (Mexico) Pumas | 0 | 3 | 0 | 0 | 3 | 2 | 6 | -4 |

== Second round ==
| (Italy) Brescia | 4 - 2 | (Italy) Juventus |

| (Italy) Atalanta | 2 - 1 | (Italy) Bari |

| (Italy) Cesena | 3 - 1 | (Italy) Cosenza |

| (Italy) Fiorentina | 0 - 0 (6-5 pen) | (Italy) Cagliari |

| (Italy) Lazio | 1 - 0 | (Italy) Palermo |

| (Italy) Torino | 3 - 3 (8-6 pen) | (Italy) Parma |

== Knockout stage ==
Quarter-finals
15 february
(Italy) Brescia (pen) | 0 (1)
(Italy) Atalanta | 0 (0)
15 february
(Italy) Cesena | 1
(Italy) Bari | 0
15 february
(Italy) Parma (pen) | 0 (3)
(Italy) Fiorentina | 0 (0)
15 february
(Italy) Lazio | 2
(Italy) Torino | 1

Semi-finals
17 february
(Italy) Brescia | 5
(Italy) Cesena | 0
17 february
(Italy) Parma (pen) | 0 (4)
(Italy) Lazio | 0 (3)

Final
19 february
(Italy) Brescia | 3
(Italy) Parma | 1
Third place
19 february
(Italy) Cesena | 2
(Italy) Lazio | 0

== Champions ==
Torneo di Viareggio 1996 Champions

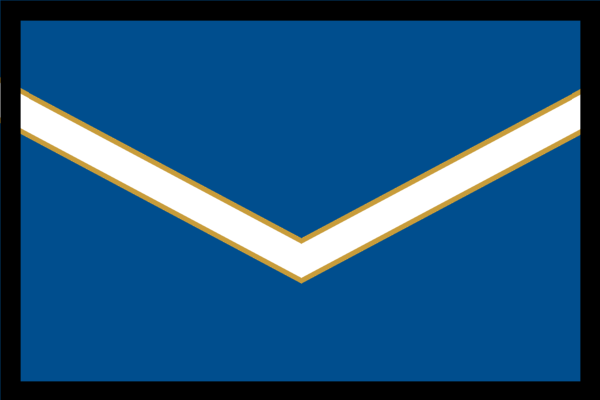

Brescia
1st time
