= 1997 Italian referendum =

A seven-part abrogative referendum was held in Italy on 15 June 1997. Voters were asked whether they approved of the repealing of laws on topics including privatisation, conscientious objectors, hunting, the judiciary and journalists, as well as whether the Ministry of Agrarian Politics should be abolished. Although all seven proposals were approved by voters, the voter turnout of 30% was well below the 50% threshold and the results were invalidated.

== Results ==
=== Repealing of the law on the golden share of the Minister of the Treasury during privatisation ===
Choice	Votes	%
Yes	9,539,493	74.1
No	3,340,908	25.9
Invalid/blank votes	1,893,077	–
Total	14,789,140	100
Registered voters/turnout	49,054,246	30.1
Source: Nohlen & Stöver

=== Repealing of the law restricting conscientious objectors ===
Choice	Votes	%
Yes	9,561,023	71.7
No	3,775,597	28.3
Invalid/blank votes	1,512,005	–
Total	14,054,246	100
Registered voters/turnout	49,054,246	30.3
Source: Nohlen & Stöver

=== Repealing of the law allowing hunters access to private property ===
Choice	Votes	%
Yes	10,936,636	80.9
No	2,581,678	19.1
Invalid/blank votes	1,288,736	–
Total	14,816,324	100
Registered voters/turnout	49,054,246	30.2
Source: Nohlen & Stöver

=== Repealing of the law on judges' careers ===
Choice	Votes	%
Yes	10,786,082	83.6
No	2,123,408	16.4
Invalid/blank votes	1,870,302	–
Total	14,792,077	100
Registered voters/turnout	49,054,246	30.2
Source: Nohlen & Stöver

=== Repealing of the law on admission to the Order of Journalists ===
Choice	Votes	%
Yes	8,322,142	65.5
No	4,380,246	34.5
Invalid/blank votes	2,010,618	–
Total	14,054,246	100
Registered voters/turnout	49,054,246	30.0
Source: Nohlen & Stöver

=== Repealing of the law allowing judges to do other work ===
Choice	Votes	%
Yes	11,160,914	85.6
No	1,879,885	14.4
Invalid/blank votes	1,759,867	–
Total	14,811,569	100
Registered voters/turnout	49,054,246	30.2
Source: Nohlen & Stöver

=== Abolishing the Ministry of Agrarian Politics ===
Choice	Votes	%
Yes	8,589,847	66.9
No	4,258,968	33.1
Invalid/blank votes	1,879,556	–
Total	14,739,766	100
Registered voters/turnout	49,054,246	30.0
Source: Nohlen & Stöver
