= Francesco Mileto =

Italian footballer

Personal information
- Date of birth: 23 September 1995 (age 31)
- Place of birth: Naples, Italy
- Height: 1.85 m (6 ft 1 in)
- Position: Defender

Team information
- Current team: Gravina
- Number: 4

Youth career
- –2012: Napoli
- 2012–2014: Juve Stabia

Senior career*
Years	Team	Apps	(Gls)
2014–2016	Juve Stabia	1	(0)
2014–2015	→ Robur Siena (loan)	15	(1)
2016–2017	Messina	17	(1)
2017	→ Akragas (loan)	16	(0)
2017–2018	Akragas	25	(2)
2018–2019	Gela	25	(0)
2019–2020	Nola	24	(0)
2020–2021	Castrovillari	29	(3)
2021	Nardò	8	(0)
2021–2022	Sarrabus Ogliastra	18	(0)
2022–2023	Palmese	27	(2)
2023–2024	Cassino	32	(1)
2024–2026	Cjarlins Muzane	39	(1)
2026–	Gravina	7	(0)
- * Club domestic league appearances and goals as of 15 March 2026

Francesco Mileto (born 23 September 1995) is an Italian football player who plays for Serie D club Gravina.

== Club career ==
He made his Serie B debut for Juve Stabia on 25 May 2014 in a game against Brescia.
