= Chilivani massacre =

- Location: Chilivani, Italy
- Date: 16 August 1995
- Target: Walter Frau and Ciriaco Carru
- Attack type: shooting
- Weapon: Unknown
- Deaths: 3
- Injuries: 1
- Victim: 1
- Perpetrators: Graziano Palmas and Salvatore Antonio Giua
- Motive: ambush following the discovery of stolen goods

The Chilivani massacre (Italian: Strage di Chilivani) was a shooting in Italy in 1995 in which were the Sardinian carabinieri Walter Frau and Ciriaco Carru and the bandit Salvatore Antonio Giua were killed. Frau and Carru were both awarded the Gold Medal of Military Valor.

== Crime ==
On 16 August 1995, Carabinieri officers Carru and Frau, serving with the mobile unit, were tracking a stolen concrete mixer which had been taken the previous night. Around 3:20 PM, they reported to the station that they had found the vehicle, containing several firearms, and another stolen vehicle in the Peldesemene area, and that they had arrested the owner, later found to be Salvatore Antonio Giua of Buddusò in the Province of Sassari. Suddenly, they were struck in the back by shots from a Kalashnikov AK-47 fired by criminals later identified as Graziano Palmas and Salvatore Andrea Gusinu.

Corporal Carru returned fire at Palmas, wounding him, then turned and killed Giua, who was attempting to flee towards Chilivani; Palmas continued shooting, killing Carabiniere Ciriaco Carru, a 32-year-old from Bitti. Meanwhile, on the other side of the street, Walter Frau, a 29-year-old Carabiniere from Ossi, confronted Gusinu, shooting him several times, but he too fell, wounded by Sebastiano Pirino's shots. Gusinu fired more shots, one of which struck the young soldier in the head.

The criminals fled. Gusinu, wounded, was arrested a few hours later by the Carabinieri near Padru. The arrest occurred following the stopping of a van in which he was travelling and which was driven by Graziano Palmas, who committed suicide with a gunshot to avoid arrest. A few days later the rest of the gang was arrested: Salvatore Sechi from Olbia, Sebastiano Demontis from Buddusò, Sebastiano Prino from Arzachena, Cosimo Cocco from Bonarcado and Milena Ladu from Olbia.

== Process ==
On 26 July 1997, in the first instance, Gusinu, Sechi, Demontis and Prino were sentenced to life imprisonment, while Cocco (a repentant) was sentenced to 22 years of imprisonment, Ladu to 25; on appeal, on 27 June 1998, the life sentences were confirmed and while Ladu's sentence was reduced by one year, Cocco's was increased by two years. Despite these sentences, the investigators have always thought that the commando included other people who had never been identified and who had a criminal profile that was decidedly greater than the convicted bandits. It was suspected that a theft which had taken place at Olbia airport had been carried out to obtain the weapons used in the robbery in exchange for the stolen technological materials.

For that theft, a criminal from Bitti, Nuoro suspected of a robbery of an armored van in Codrongianos, who was killed in an ambush in 2008 in San Teodoro, and a criminal from Nuoro who was also investigated (later acquitted) for the Ozieri massacre due to a strange wound which was thought to have been inflicted by one of the two carabinieri killed in the conflict were condemned.

A witness to the incident is Stefano Bandecchi, current mayor of Terni and founder of the Niccolò Cusano online university. Bandecchi himself revealed that he was a key witness in the trial in an interview with "La Zanzara" on November 28, 2023.

In April 2025, the grave of Frau was vandalised and a man was arrested.

== Bibliography ==
- Giovanni Ricci, Sardegna Criminale, Newton Compton, 2008
