= Milonga (film) =

- Directed by: Emidio Greco
- Written by: Paolo Breccia; Emidio Greco
- Produced by: Franco Committeri; Pio Angeletti; Adriano De Micheli
- Starring: Giancarlo Giannini; Claudia Pandolfi
- Cinematography: Marco Sperduti
- Music by: Luis Bacalov
- Release date: 1999
- Running time: 89 minutes
- Country: Italy
- Language: Italian

Milonga (translation: Tango) is a 1999 Italian thriller film co-written and directed by Emidio Greco. For his performance Giancarlo Giannini won the Globo d'oro for best actor.

== Plot ==
In one of the most central squares of Rome, Piazza Barberini, the famous TV star Aldo Ruggeri is killed in broad daylight. The commissioner, accompanied by agent Ginevra Scapuzzo, arrives on the spot to start the investigation. After various vicissitudes the commissioner, thanks to a tango listened to on the radio, will be able to connect the facts by discovering the killers. Going to Milonga, that is the place where the tango is danced, he will find the two killers, a man and a woman. When the music ends, in a firefight, the commissioner kills the man while the girl manages to escape.

== Cast ==
- Giancarlo Giannini as Inspector
- Claudia Pandolfi as Scapuzzo
- Carlo Cecchi as "Character A"
- Irene Ferri as Killer Woman
- Gianni Sperti as Killer Man
- Yvonne Sciò as Marlene
- Vanessa Gravina as Rossella

== See also ==
- List of Italian films of 1999
