= David Zimmerhofer =

Italian footballer (born 1995)

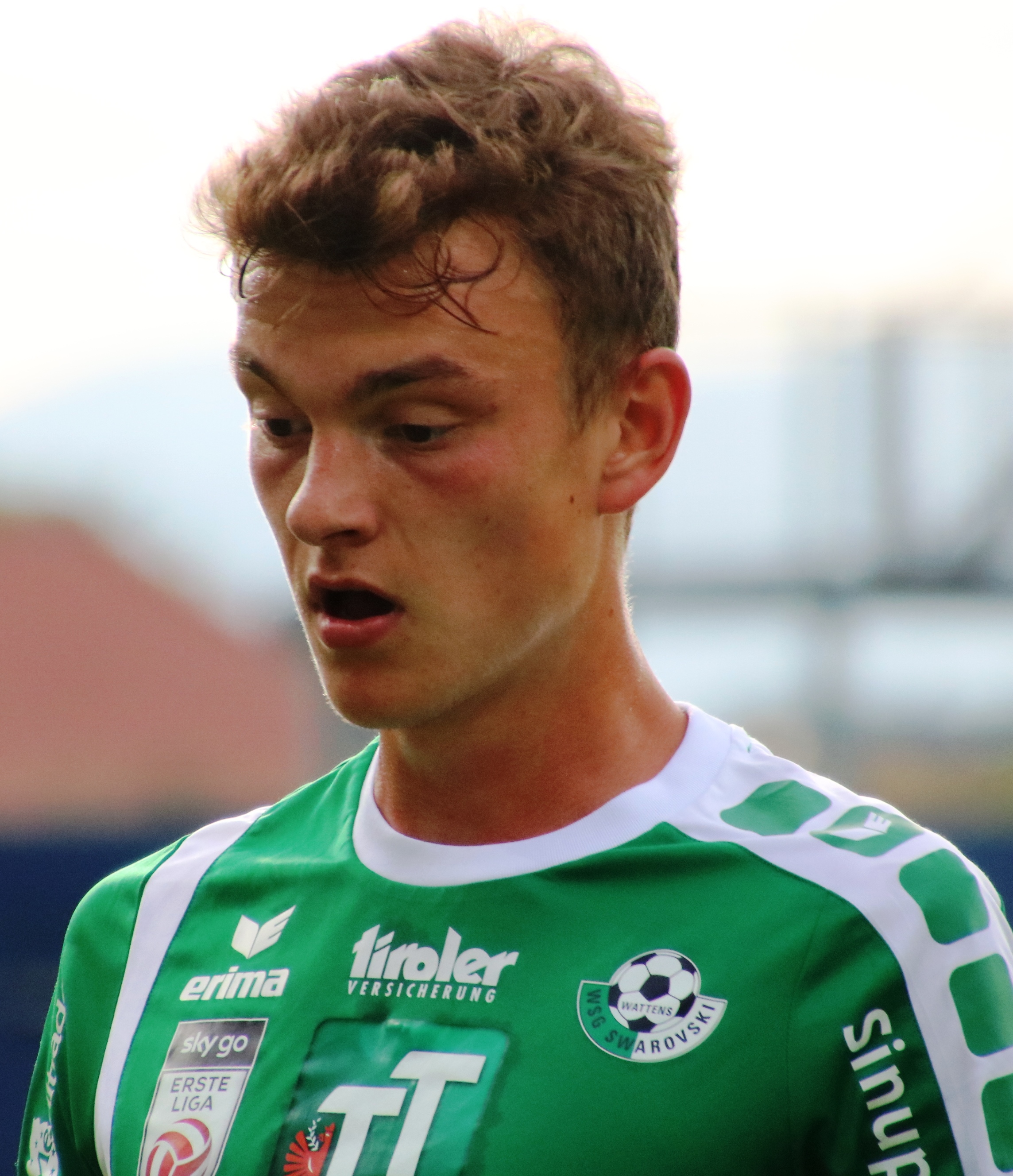
- Zimmerhofer with WSG Wattens in 2017

Personal information
- Date of birth: 30 August 1995 (age 31)
- Place of birth: Bolzano, Italy
- Height: 1.81 m (5 ft 11 1/2 in)
- Position: Defender

Team information
- Current team: SSV Ahrntal

Youth career
- –2014: Südtirol

Senior career*
Years	Team	Apps	(Gls)
2013	Südtirol	0	(0)
2013	→ Sambonifacese (loan)	12	(0)
2014–2018	WSG Wattens	65	(0)
2018–	SSV Ahrntal	?	(?)
- * Club domestic league appearances and goals

David Zimmerhofer (born 30 August 1995) is an Italian football player. He plays for SSV Ahrntal.

== Club career ==
He made his Austrian Football First League debut for WSG Wattens on 22 July 2016 in a game against FC Blau-Weiß Linz.
