= Riccardo Ferrara =

Italian footballer (born 1995)

Personal information
- Date of birth: 14 July 1995 (age 31)
- Place of birth: Palermo, Italy
- Height: 1.93 m (6 ft 4 in)
- Position: Goalkeeper

Team information
- Current team: Città di Sant'Agata

Youth career
- Trapani

Senior career*
Years	Team	Apps	(Gls)
2014–2019	Trapani	1	(0)
2014	→ Maceratese (loan)	11	(0)
2015–2016	→ Lucchese (loan)	1	(0)
2019	Casarano	0	(0)
2019	Acireale	0	(0)
2019–	Città di Sant'Agata		
- * Club domestic league appearances and goals as of 15 June 2019

Riccardo Ferrara (born 14 July 1995) is an Italian football player who plays for ACD Città di Sant'Agata.

== Club career ==
He made his professional debut in the Lega Pro for Lucchese on 8 May 2016 in a game against Carrarese which his team lost with a score of 4–5.

On 19 August 2019, he signed with Serie D club Casarano. However, one month later, he left Casarano and joined Serie D club Acireale on 13 September 2019. On 6 December 2019, Ferrara made his third transfer in 2019 and joined ACD Città di Sant'Agata.
