= Alberto Boniotti =

Italian football player (born 1995)

Personal information
- Date of birth: 23 March 1995 (age 31)
- Place of birth: Brescia, Italy
- Height: 1.79 m (5 ft 10 in)
- Position: Right back

Team information
- Current team: FC Castiglione

Youth career
- –2013: Brescia

Senior career*
Years	Team	Apps	(Gls)
2013–2019	Brescia	2	(0)
2015–2016	→ Pordenone (loan)	30	(0)
2016–2017	→ Padova (loan)	9	(0)
2017	→ Pordenone (loan)	0	(0)
2017–2018	→ Cosenza (loan)	4	(0)
2020–	FC Castiglione		
- * Club domestic league appearances and goals as of 1 July 2019

Alberto Boniotti (born 23 March 1995) is an Italian football player who plays for FC Castiglione.

== Club career ==
He made his Serie B debut for Brescia on 25 May 2014 in a game against Juve Stabia.

After training with FC Castiglione since November 2019, Boniotti officially signed with the club in January 2020.
