= Nicola Sambo =

Italian footballer

Personal information
- Date of birth: 16 November 1995 (age 30)
- Place of birth: Venice, Italy
- Height: 1.89 m (6 ft 2 in)
- Position: Goalkeeper

Senior career*
Years	Team	Apps	(Gls)
2012–2014	ChievoVerona	0	(0)
2013	→ Lumezzane (loan)	0	(0)
2014–2015	Spezia	0	(0)
2015–2016	Santarcangelo	1	(0)
2016–2018	Venezia	1	(0)
2018	Livorno	1	(0)
2018–2019	Carpi	0	(0)
2019	Luparense	3	(0)
- * Club domestic league appearances and goals as of 22:08, 5 February 2020 (UTC)

Nicola Sambo (born 16 November 1995) is an Italian professional footballer who plays as a goalkeeper.

== Club career ==
On 8 November 2018, he signed with Serie B club Carpi until the end of the 2018–19 season.

In August 2019, he moved to Serie D club Luparense. He left the club again in December 2019.
