= Murder of Nada Cella =

1996 murder in Chiavari, Italy

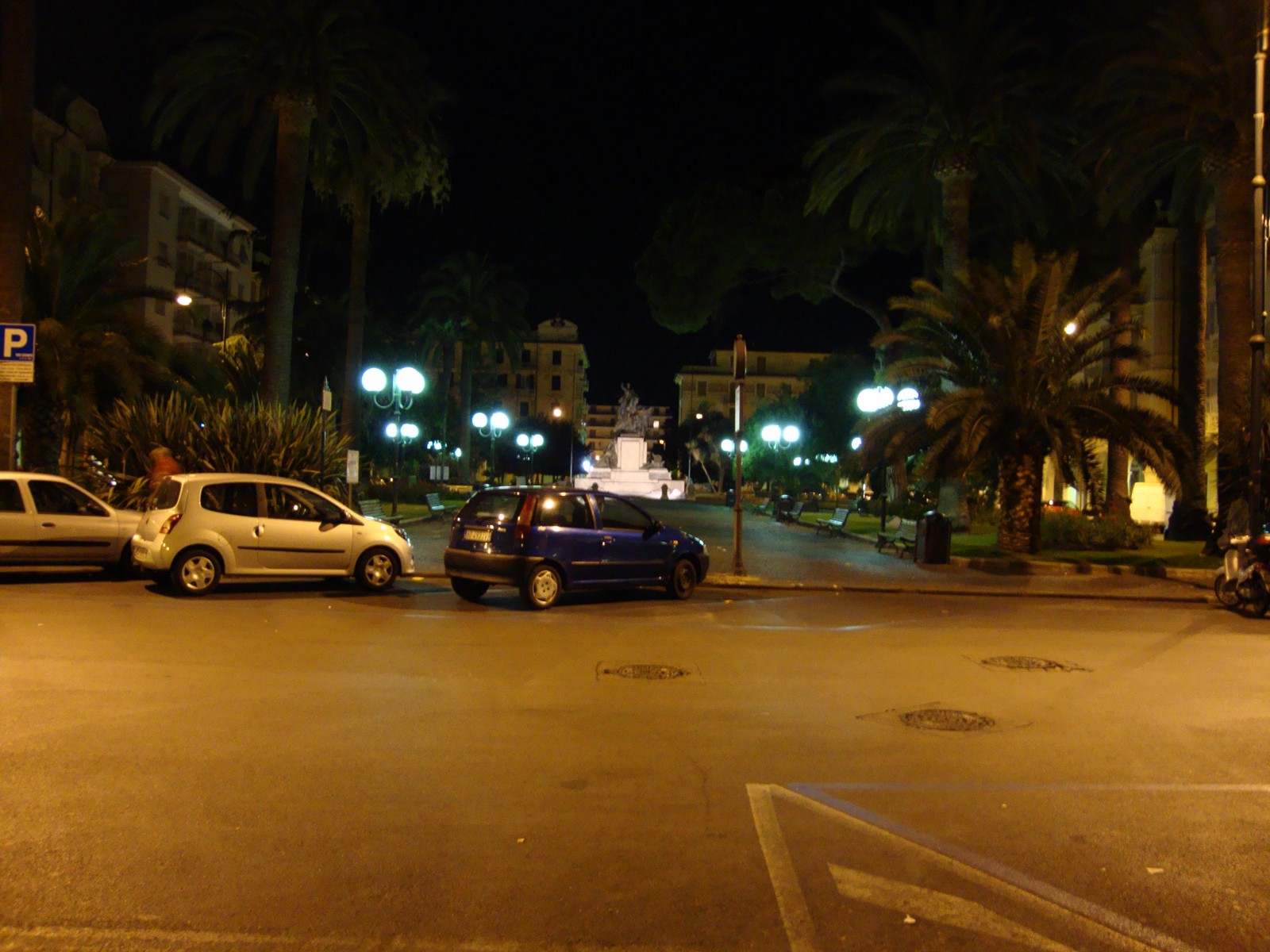
- Chiavari, near via Marsala, in 2009
- Native name: Delitto di via Marsala
- Location: Chiavari, Italy
- Date: 6 May 1996 approximately 08:35 – 9.10 (CET)
- Attack type: Murder
- Weapon: Unknown
- Deaths: 1
- Perpetrators: Annalucia Cecere (sentenced to 24 years in prison); Marco Soracco (sentenced to two years for aiding and abetting); Marisa Bacchioni (initially charged with aiding and abetting and making false statements, but was excluded from the trial due to her advanced age and mental health, which is incompatible with prison).

Nada Cella was a 25-year-old Italian woman who was murdered at her place of work on the morning of 6 May 1996 in Chiavari, in the metropolitan city of Genoa. The crime, known in Italy as the delitto di via Marsala (English: Marsala Street Crime) has remained unsolved for 30 years. On 15 January 2026, Annalucia Cecere was sentenced to 24 years in prison for committing the murder, while Marco Soracco received 2 years for aiding and abetting.

== Events ==
Nada Cella was born in Chiavari in 1971. She had been working as a secretary for five years at the office of accountant Marco Soracco, on the second floor of a building at 14 via Marsala in Chiavari. On 6 May 1996, after arriving at work at around 8.35, around 9.00 she received a person who had rung the intercom. She was then attacked and hit at least fifteen times on the head and groin area with a blunt object that has never been found.

According to what he reported in his deposition, Soracco went down to the study at around 9.10 from the apartment above where he lived and heard the phone ringing. He answered but, after a few seconds, the call was cut off. Soracco then searched for the secretary and found her on the floor, covered in blood and with her body in spasms. He then returned to his apartment on the third floor to warn his mother and called for help at 9.14. He went back downstairs with his mother to the study and, according to what was later reported in the mother's deposition, "seeing all that blood with my son we thought that Nada had suffered a stroke".

The young woman was first taken to the hospital in Lavagna and then transferred to the San Martino Hospital in Genoa, where she died soon after arrival. In the meantime, other people entered the office. Because police arriving on the scene initially thought the death was an accident, the building was not treated as a crime scene. The initial investigation was hampered by the fact that Soracco's mother had cleaned the stairs and the landing in front of the office.

== Investigation ==
Investigators hypothesized that the young woman had been struck with an object and then fell to the ground where the attacker continued to hit her, even taking her head in his hands to hit her against a smooth surface, probably the floor. The dynamics led to the hypothesis that the victim knew the murderer, who knew how to move around the office. The employer, Marco Soracco, was therefore suspected. According to a witness, a tenant who often watched the passage through the peephole when she was alarmed by the barking of her dog, Soracco would have arrived around 8.50, twenty minutes before Cella called for help.

Soracco's involvement and a potential further motive were hypothesized in connection with a work conflict which began from the testimony of his colleague, Dr. Bertuccio, who, having learned of the crime, thought back to a phrase Soracco had said a short time before: "Soon there will be a bang, even the newspapers will talk about it. The secretary will leave". In light of the crime, such a phrase seemed to suggest a possible motive. The testimony of Soracco's mother also led in this direction, as she said she had seen Nada in the office the previous Saturday, two days before the crime, while she was packing away a floppy disk which was never found among her belongings. However, her work booklet was found in her handbag, a document which is usually in the possession of the employer, and from here the hypothesis of the end of the professional relationship arose, but Soracco denied this was true.

The secretary's arrival at the office on Saturday morning aroused interest, as she had never shown up for work outside of working hours in the previous five years, and Soracco himself confirmed to the investigators that there was no reason why Nada would have done so. The investigations into the young woman's private life did not reveal any elements that could have led to other hypotheses. The only thing that remained was the belief that the secretary had been killed by a person she knew and who regularly frequented the office. In the meantime, however, the testimonies of the neighbour and of Bertuccio were retracted and, thanks to the negative result of DNA testing, Soracco was exonerated.

At the crime scene no traces or clues were found that were considered useful for the investigation at the time. This included such things as footprints or fingerprints; additionally, the murder weapon was never found. Furthermore, no one in the building heard any screams or suspicious noises and the presence of strangers was not noticed. To complicate the situation, the first responders, thinking it was an accident and not a crime, had altered the crime scene. Soracco's mother, who lived in the apartment above the office, even cleaned the stairwell and the landing in front of the office of significant traces of blood. It was possible to ascertain that no one had seen the young woman enter the office, nor had any noises been heard between 8:51, when the secretary printed a document from the computer, and 9:11, when Soracco arrived at the office. Only the tenant on the floor below claimed to have heard the office door slam a few minutes after 9:00. A button with a distinctive star design was also found at the crime scene, which years later would lead to new investigative hypotheses.

At the end of 1998 the case was closed by police and Soracco and his mother were cleared of any involvement. Another suspect was Annalucia Cecere who, according to a hypothesis of the investigators, wanted to take Nada's place in the accountant's office; but this hypothesis was later closed. In November 1999 investigations were ordered on a bricklayer from the area, who was found guilty of the murder of a Serbian prostitute. In 2005 the case was reopened starting from analysing Nada Cella's diaries. The following year the Genoa Public Prosecutor's Office investigated two other bricklayers for the crime, who were involved in an investigation into the prostitution racket. In 2011, three hairs were found which, after forensic analysis, turned out not to belong to the victim.

=== Further developments ===
In the summer of 2019, Annalucia Cecere, who was declared a suspect in 1996, threatened criminologist Antonella Pesce Delfino with voice messages. Delfino was working on reopening the case on behalf of Nada's mother, who had shown up at her house to ask her questions. These messages would then be attached to the material being examined by the prosecutor's office in the 2021 investigation.

In 2021, in fact, other investigations were started thanks to new forensic techniques that allowed further identification. Traces were found on an office chair and on the girl's clothes, identified as two male and female DNA profiles, as well as a fingerprint. Following the re-examination of some testimonies, in the same year the seizure of a moped owned by Annalucia Cecere was ordered, who was then investigated again because, following an anonymous phone call, the Carabinieri were told that she had been seen on the morning of the murder moving away from Via Marsala on her moped. The checks, aimed at finding traces of blood on the moped, however, gave a negative result. Cecere, questioned by the Public Prosecutor's Office in Genoa, stated that she had been busy cleaning a dental practice in Sestri Levante on the morning of the murder. The woman, who at the time lived in Corso Dante, a few steps from Via Marsala, was said to be jealous of Nada, who she wanted to replace in her position at the firm. According to what was reported to the Carabinieri of Sestri Levante by a neighbour of hers at the time, she had designs on the accountant, whom she had known and met, while he instead distanced himself from her, declaring that he had always and only frequented her in the company of friends, without reserving particular attention for her.

During a search of Cecere's home, five buttons from a denim jacket similar to the one found at the crime scene were found, placed in a small box: the buttons were photographically compared to the evidence from the crime scene, but the analysis was not considered sufficient, so the lead had no further results. The chief prosecutor Gio Batta Copello issued a press release stating that Cecere was not involved in the crime and that the case was closed, basing his statement on the report of the head of the investigation, the public prosecutor Filippo Gebbia, who had carried out the first investigations and then closed them.

In the new investigations of 2021, Marco Soracco and his mother, Marisa Bacchioni, were also included in the register of suspects, accused of false declarations as they had not told everything they knew about Cecere. In 2021 and 2022, the positions of some people involved were re-examined: the public prosecutor Gabriella Dotto, of the Genoa prosecutor's office, returned to some decisions of the public prosecutor Gebbia, now retired, and would have heard him on the matter, in particular on the setting aside of the buttons as evidence to be followed and the investigations into Cecere.

In March 2023, the Genoa Public Prosecutor's Office requested a six-month extension for the investigations, given the discovery of a box in the Unsolved Crimes Unit in Rome containing evidence collected at the crime scene. In April 2023, the contribution of a witness heard at the time by the prosecutor Gebbia was also re-examined, and this time it was given greater prominence thanks to the report by criminologist Antonella Pesce Delfino, a scholar of the folder of the investigations carried out by the Carabinieri in 1996. To the witness, a neighbor of Cecere, the latter reported her jealousy towards Cella, both professionally and sentimentally, with Soracco being at the center of it.

In October 2023, the Prosecutor's Office closed the preliminary investigations and notified Annalucia Cecere, accused of voluntary homicide, aggravated by futile motives and cruelty as she killed Nada Cella because she wanted to take her place both at work and with the accountant Marco Soracco. Soracco and his mother were charged with the crimes of false declarations to the judicial authority and aiding and abetting. Soracco, according to the magistrates, after having surprised the murderer in his office, decided with his mother not to say anything so as not to draw attention to his work and his life. The investigators hypothesized that either Soracco or nuns from Chiavari, who had already helped her previously as she was a single mother, could have helped Cecere financially to leave Chiavari (the woman moved to Piedmont about a month after the crime), paying her rent and the purchase of furniture. In December the Genoa Public Prosecutor's Office requested that the three suspects be sent for trial.

In January 2024, the notification of the preliminary hearing was announced to Annalucia Cecere. A re-examination of the documents has in fact allowed new elements to be highlighted, including an exchange of black money (perhaps discovered by Nada Cella), which would have contributed to motivating the crime, which matured into a tangle with sentimental and criminal characteristics at the same time. A further element that came to light and was reported by the public prosecutor is that the strong resemblance between the suspect Annalucia Cecere and the victim could have induced a key witness to mistaken identity. This resemblance could have thus made it possible for Cecere, on the day of the crime, to possibly escape.

However on 1 March 2024, Cecere was acquitted by GUP Angela Maria Nutini due to the lack of sufficient elements for a reasonable hypothesis of conviction, a condition for which a trial can be opened since the promulgation of the Cartabia reform. Since the suspect's scooter had been modified by the owner with spare parts, with only the engine and some mechanical segments of the original model surviving, it was not possible to find DNA evidence of the suspect. The charges against Soracco and his mother were therefore also dropped. According to Nutini, the pair had "peacefully attempted to mislead" and therefore "they did indeed lie, but to protect themselves from a possible charge of murder and therefore in a legally lawful manner".

The following month, the PM Gabriella Dotto filed an appeal, arguing that the acquittal sentence presents "multiple misrepresentations in the examination of the evidence and the facts which inevitably devalue the complexity of the investigation". In addition, in fact, to the need to clarify the proceedings for which the evidence was made unavailable, another point on which potential investigations are being conducted and on which the attention of the public and any acquaintances is being drawn is the identity of the woman who had telephoned, at the time, some witnesses claimed to have seen Cecere in Via Marsala at the time of the crime.

On 20 November of the same year, the judges of the Court of Appeal accepted the appeal, sending Cecere, Soracco and the mother, Marisa Bacchioni to trial, with the trial set to begin on 6 February 2025. However, the accountant's mother will never go to trial following a decision by the president of the Court of Cassation, who in March accepted her lawyer's request since the woman would not be able to understand, given her age.

=== 30 years to reach a verdict ===
Nearly 30 years after the crime, the perpetrator and other individuals involved were identified. Annalucia Cecere was charged with murder, while Marco Soracco and his mother were accused of actions that allegedly altered the crime scene and hindered the investigation. The charge of cruelty against Cecere was later dropped.

The prosecution requested a life sentence. On 15 January 2026, Cecere was sentenced to 24 years' imprisonment for the murder, while Soracco received 2 years for aiding and abetting.

After the crime, Cecere left Chiavari and moved to Boves, Piedmont, in the province of Cuneo, where she lived with her family. She worked for a short time as a teacher in Montaldo di Mondovì.

Following the conviction, members of Cecere's family reportedly confronted journalists.

According to statements reported in the press, Nada Cella's mother, Silvana Smaniotto, described the conviction as the end of a long judicial process lasting nearly 30 years.

== Cultural influences ==
Several journalists have dealt with the case in the television programmes Chi l'ha visto?, Blu notte - Misteri italiani and Quarto grado, in the podcast Indagini by Stefano Nazzi and in web formats such as Indagini aperte which has been able to avail itself, over the years, of testimonies and insights from protagonists and professionals in the sector who have distinguished themselves in the context of the case, including the journalist and writer Igor Patruno.

== Bibliography ==
- Liguria criminale: 10 casi insoluti di cronaca nera. Fratelli Frilli Editori. 2013. ISBN 9788875639181.
- A pista fredda. Il delitto di Nada Cella. Imprimatur. 2018. ISBN 9788868306885.
- Il delitto di Chiavari. La strana morte di Nada Cella. Roma: Armando. 2023. ISBN 9791259841186.
