= Murder of Nadia Roccia =

1998 murder in Italy

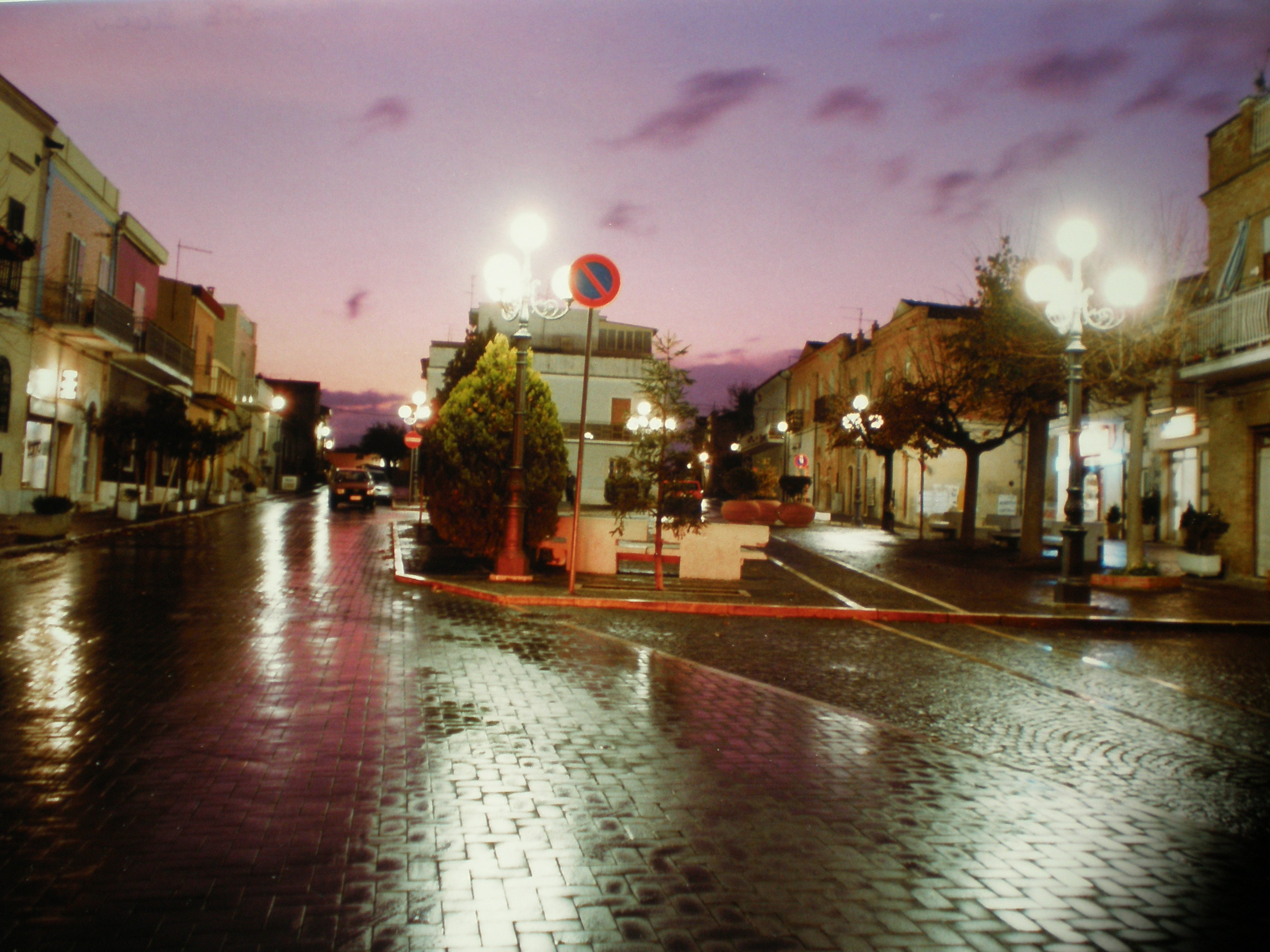
- Castelluccio dei Sauri
- Location: Castelluccio dei Sauri, Italy
- Date: 14 March 1998; 6:45 PM (CET)
- Attack type: Strangulation
- Deaths: 1
- Victim: 1
- Perpetrators: Anna Maria Botticelli; Maria Filomena Sica
- Motive: Unknown

Nadia Roccia was an 18-year-old Italian student who was murdered on 14 March 1998 in Castelluccio dei Sauri, Italy. She was in her fifth year of high school at the Poerio teacher training institute in Foggia when she was killed by two of her female friends of the same age Anna Maria Botticelli and Maria (Mariena) Filomena Sica.

On May 22, 2001, the two were sentenced to 25 years each in prison for the murder. Botticelli and Sica were released from prison in 2013 and currently live under new identities.

== Background ==
The peers Nadia Roccia, Anna Maria Botticelli and Maria Filomena Sica had known each other since childhood and had a good friendship. During adolescence, Botticelli and Sica began to develop hostile feelings towards Roccia. One of the reasons could derive from a broken promise by Nadia, who had said that an uncle of hers living in the United States of America could help them settle there after graduation, only to later retract what she had said.

The investigation revealed that Botticelli and Sica had been planning to kill their friend Roccia for months before the murder. On one occasion they tried to offer her Coca-Cola laced with rat poison, but the girl refused to drink it. They later told her that they had gotten into debt with some criminals, and suggested that she prostitute herself to help them repay the debts, stating that otherwise they would attempt suicide. Sica recanted the story when Roccia, worried, suggested that she talk to her parents.

The girls then began to premeditate a structured plan to murder Roccia. Botticelli spread the rumour that Nadia had an unwelcome sexual attraction towards her, after which she made the girl sign a sheet of paper with the excuse that she wanted to have her handwriting examined by a graphologist friend.

== Murder ==
On the afternoon of 14 March 1998, the two friends invited Nadia to the Botticelli family's garage at Via Roma 63, where a study space had been set up. Roccia arrived at 5:00 PM. At 6:45 PM, following an agreed signal, Sica attacked Nadia by tightening a scarf around her throat, while Botticelli restrained the victim, inciting her when Sica expressed concern that she would not be able to fully strangle her to death. The killing actually took longer than they had expected.

Soon after, Botticelli checked that Roccia was no longer breathing by holding a mirror in front of her nose after which they staged the scene by tying a rope around her neck to simulate a hanging. On the table they left a letter previously typed with a typewriter, on the same sheet of paper signed by Nadia. In the false document, Roccia seemed to motivate her suicide by confessing that she was a lesbian and in love with Botticelli.

The two murderers then went to the Roccia family's house and told Nadia's mother that her daughter had felt ill and had sent them to buy food, but when they returned they found the garage door closed, with Nadia not answering their calls. The Roccia family followed the girls to the Botticellis' house, where they forced the door and discovered the body.

== Investigations ==
The alleged suicide note left by the victim immediately aroused the suspicions of the investigators, since it was not entirely handwritten and ended with the recommendation that the deceased's savings be distributed to her friends so that they could leave for America after graduation. Other suspicions arose from the tone of the note, considered too "light-hearted" for a suicidal intent, and from the fact that the body and the noose rope were found on the ground, without any way that Roccia could use to hang herself. The autopsy confirmed that Nadia had been strangled and Botticelli and Sica were interrogated and their rooms were searched where Satanist material was found. The carabinieri placed a covert listening device there, through which they intercepted the two girls while they agreed to divert the investigation. At the second interrogation, the girls were forced to confess and agreed to reconstruct the murder at the crime scene for an evidentiary incident. During the explanation they maintained a cold and detached attitude, without showing any remorse and sometimes even bursting out laughing.

As the investigators tried to understand the motivation that could have pushed the two girls to commit the murder, the possibility that Roccia had been the victim of a satanic ritual was taken into consideration, given the large quantity of esoteric objects found in the houses and the intercepted conversations in which one of the girls mentioned Lucifer. Later, Botticelli claimed before the investigators that it was Sica's deceased father, who appeared to her in a dream, who pushed her to kill Nadia as a "sacrifice" to ensure a bright future for herself. Botticelli also reported that Sica's father, at first, had asked her to kill his daughter to be reunited with her. Anna Maria had Nadia Roccia strangled by Maria Filomena Sica because it was the "spirit" who asked her to do so, but she had actively participated in the crime by violently beating the victim.

The magistrates ordered a psychiatric evaluation of the two girls, which declared them to be fully capable of understanding and willing. At the appeal trial, the public prosecutor Antonino Mirabile hypothesized that there was a homosexual relationship between the two murderers that was "hindered" by Nadia. The matter was not investigated further, and the motive has never been clarified.

== Trial ==
In 1998 Mariena received an anonymous letter with a death threat if she revealed all the details of the crime: the public prosecutor Diella changed the charge from murder to murder with the participation of unknown persons. Further investigations into the matter, however, did not lead to the identification of other culprits; it was theorized that the letter had been written by a mythomaniac. On 8 February 1999, Sica and Botticelli were sentenced to life imprisonment in the first instance.

The defense appealed to a further psychiatric assessment, in which both girls were diagnosed with a dissociative disorder from reality, who, therefore, would not have been fully aware of the murder committed. The clinical picture was added to by the extenuating circumstance given by the confession of the two during the preliminary investigation. On 22 May 2001, at the appeal trial, the two girls were sentenced to 25 years of imprisonment. Two months later, the Court of Cassation annulled the sentences without referral. On 10 February 2003, the girls pleaded guilty to a reduction of the sentence to 21 years. Sica, briefly released from prison after the expiration of the terms of the pre-trial detention, was imprisoned again when the sentence became final, she was released in 2013 for good behaviour. A few months after the conviction, Anna Maria Botticelli was also released from prison due to the worsening of the multiple sclerosis from which she had suffered since childhood.

The two currently live under new identities in Tuscany and Veneto.
