= Murder of Luigia Borrelli =

1995 murder case in Italy

- Native name: Delitto del trapano
- Location: Genoa, Italy
- Date: 5 September 1995 (CET)
- Target: Luigia Borrelli
- Attack type: Murder
- Weapon: Drill
- Deaths: 1

The murder of Luigia Borrelli, known in Italy as the "Drill Crime" (Italian: delitto del trapano) was carried out on the night of 5 September 1995 in the historic centre of Genoa. The victim was a 42-year-old former nurse, also known by the name of "Antonella", who worked as a prostitute in the alley where she was murdered.

The murder is known as the Drill Crime, taking its name from the tool used to kill the victim. It is remembered in the news as one of the most brutal crimes committed in the capital of Liguria in recent times and remained unsolved for many years until the case was reopened in 2023.

== Background ==
Luigia Borrelli was born in the 1950s in Iglesias, Sardinia, but at the end of the 1970s she moved to Genoa, where she found a job as a nurse at the San Martino Hospital. In the city she also met the man she went to live with, Mario Arnaldo Andreini, a divorced warehouse worker, with whom she had two children. Towards the end of the 1980s, Andreini tried to open a bar in the same neighbourhood where Borrelli worked. He did not have the money necessary for renovations, and went into debt with loan sharks owing 250 million lira. In February 1990, Andreini died of a heart attack. Borrelli was left with the task of supporting her two children and repaying the large debt, of which she had been unaware of until after her husband's death.

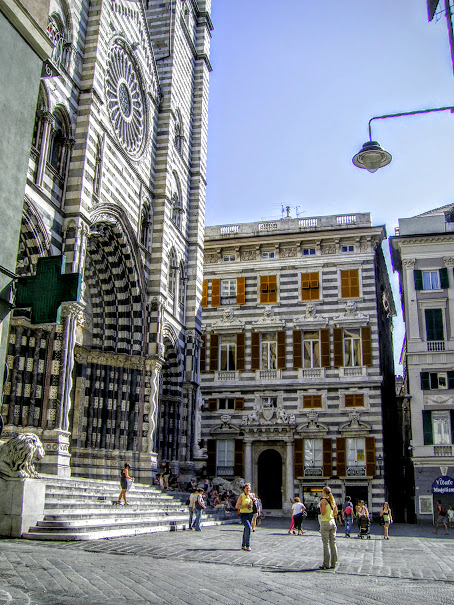
Genoa Cathedral near the scene of the crime

Threatened and pressured by loan sharks, Luigia quit her job as a nurse in 1992 and began to prostitute herself under the fictitious name of "Antonella" to pay off her debts. She rented a property in the alleyway of Vico degli Indoratori at number 64, near the Genoa Cathedral, where she could ply her trade. In July 1993 she was evicted, and moved from Corso Gastaldi, in the Foce district, to Monticelli in Marassi. She managed to generate a rather large clientele in the Molo district, so much so that she could pay her rent and her debt. This however also attracted the antipathy of other prostitutes under pimps. She told her children that she was a carer for an elderly woman, Adriana Fravega, who was a former prostitute and owner of the property where Borrelli organised the appointments.

On the day of her murder, 5 September 1995, "Antonella" was seen having breakfast at the bar, around 10:30 am, on the corner between Piazza Carloforte and via Bonifacio, a few steps from her house, a regular stop, as the owner of the bar recalled. She was later seen at around 1 pm in a pizzeria where she usually ate, near Vico Indoratori, and an hour later in a bar in Piazza San Matteo, in the company of another prostitute. This was the last sighting of her alive.

The morning of the following day, at the request of her 19-year-old daughter Francesca, who had not seen her mother return home, Adriana Fravega went to check the premises on Vico Indoratori, which she was able to enter at 8:30 due to the intervention of the Carabinieri. The body was found there. She was covered in blood, in a room turned upside down by what had been an apparent fight between the attacker and the victim. She had broken teeth, several bruises and a drill stuck in her throat, a tool that gave the crime its media name. None of the ten wounds, including the one inflicted by the drill, were immediately fatal. From the autopsy examination by the coroner, it emerged that Borrelli had been attacked between 9 and 11 pm the previous evening and had died from the serious injuries she had sustained. Investigators described the crime scene as "overkill".

== Aftermath ==
Following the broadcast, in May 2022, of the programme Mostri senza nome - Genova, on Sky and NowTv, a production of Crime + Investigation, with an episode on the "drill crime" narrated by Matteo Caccia – with the participation of Petruzziello and the journalist Marco Menduni, reporter fo Il Secolo XIX. In 2023 the investigations were reopened with new DNA tests which exonerated the original prime suspect, who died in 2021, along with all the suspects from the years following the crime.

== See also ==
- List of unsolved murders (1980–1999)

== Bibliography ==
- Andrea Casazza, Max Mauceri, Liguria criminale. Dieci casi insoluti di cronaca nera, Genova, Fratelli Frilli Editori, 2005.
