= Chi l'ha visto? =

Italian TV series

- Country of origin: Italy

Original release
- Release: April 30, 1989

Chi l'ha visto? is a television series that airs on Rai 3 about mysteries about missing people currently hosted by Federica Sciarelli.

== History ==
The program was first aired on April 30, 1989 by Donatella Raffai and Paolo Guzzanti. The format of the episodes was inspired by Portobello, which described the cases of people going missing.

In October 2012, Paolo Ruffini, a journalist, left the Chi l'ha visto? team. On November 12, 2013, Fiore De Rienzo left the team.

On October 23, 2024, Chi l'ha visto? launched an episode that features the discovery of a girl from Viareggio and a case about Greta Spreafico.

In early October 2025, Sciarelli launched a new episode of Chi l'ha visto?. The episode includes continuation of the investigation of a murder in Garlasco.

On October 8, 2025, Chi l'ha visto? released an episode that features the continued investigation of the death of Liliana Resinovich four years after the case began.
