= Buonvicino massacre =

1996 crime in Italy

Coordinates: 39°41′33.8″N 15°51′11.0″E

- Native name: Strage di Buonvicino
- Location: Buonvicino, Italy
- Date: 19 November 1996; 8:00 PM – 9:00 AM (CET)
- Target: Genoveffa "Genny" Salemme and her family
- Attack type: Murder
- Weapon: Service pistol
- Deaths: 6
- Injuries: 2
- Perpetrator: Alfredo Valente
- Motive: Request for divorce

The Buonvicino massacre (Italian: strage di Buonvicino) was a crime committed on 19 November 1996 in Buonvicino, in the province of Cosenza, Italy, by the Carabiniere Alfredo Valente against his wife and her family, for reasons of jealousy. Valente was convicted of murdering six family members and was released from prison in 2021.

== Events ==
Alfredo Valente was a 33-year-old Carabiniere, stationed in Formia. He was married to Genoveffa Salemme, known as "Genny", who was 32, but they had been arguing for a long time and could not stay together, so she decided to return to her parents' house, in the Visciglioso district.

A few weeks later, on 19 November 1996, Salemme decided to invite her family to a dinner at her parents' house. In addition to her parents 75-year-old Raffaele Salemme and his wife 72-year-old Marianna Amoroso, her 4-year-old daughter Alessandra, her sister Francesca, her brother-in-law Luigi, and their children, Fabiana and Marco Benvenuto, were also present. Three days later, Salemme was supposed to sign the divorce papers.

That day Valente, after arguing with his wife on the phone at 11 AM, left Formia at 16:30 to reach Buonvicino. Shortly after or during dinner, around 20:30, he entered the house where they were and immediately began to shoot 23 gunshots with his service pistol. First he killed his wife, then his other relatives, in front of the three terrified children. Once the massacre of the adult relatives was over, he warned the children that they would have to leave for a trip with him, but Fabiana threw herself on the lifeless body of her mother Francesca, and was also killed.

Valente took his daughter Alessandra and his nephew Marco in his old Audi 80 and they set off north towards Brescia to deliver the two children to their brothers-in-law Giovanni Salemme and Vianella Balzarini who lived in Concesio on the outskirts of Brescia. But at the 143rd km of the A21 motorway near Castelvetro Piacentino he burned out the engine and called a taxi and at 8:00 he reached his relatives' house in Concesio and after about an hour, at 09:00, he decided to hand himself over to the police in Brescia.

=== Consequences ===
Alfredo Valente was sentenced to 30 years in prison and served 25 years, taking advantage of a small reduction in sentence for good behaviour.

He returned to live in Buonvicino, a short distance from where Marco Benvenuto, one of the two survivors and who in 2021 was 28 years old, was determined to tell his story as today the massacre is now forgotten. In 2021 his cousin, Fabrizia Arcuri, decided to publish a book, written together with the criminologist Sergio Caruso, which traces the entire massacre and the lives of the people involved titled Sangue del mio sangue.

== Bibliography ==
- Fabrizia Rossetta Arcuri, Sergio Caruso. Sangue del mio sangue. Roma, Falco editori, 2021. ISBN 978-8894511093.

== See also ==
- Buonvicino
