= Murder of Giulia Cecchettin =

2023 murder in Fossò, Italy

Giulia Cecchettin
- Born: 5 May 2001; Padua, Veneto, Italy
- Disappeared: 11 November 2023; Vigonovo, Veneto, Italy
- Died: 11 November 2023 (aged 22); Fossò, Veneto, Italy
- Cause of death: Stabbing
- Body discovered: 18 November 2023
- Resting place: Saonara, Veneto, Italy

Giulia Cecchettin (Italian: [ˈdʒuːlja tʃekketˈtin], Venetian: [tʃekeˈtiŋ]; 5 May 2001 – 11 November 2023) was an Italian university student who was murdered by her ex-boyfriend Filippo Turetta on 11 November 2023. Her murder sparked protests in Italy against femicide. Together with the murder of Giulia Tramontano a few months later, it was the case that in the 2020s contributed most to public opinion on domestic violence.

== Life ==
Giulia Cecchettin was born in Padua on 5 May 2001 to Gino Cecchettin and Monica Camerotto. She is their second child, and has two siblings.

She was enrolled at University of Padua, where she studied biomedical engineering and met Filippo Turetta (born on 18 December 2001). They had a relationship that ended in August 2023, though they continued to stay in contact. Giulia's sister Elena revealed that Turetta was possessive; in the autumn of 2023, he began to behave irrationally, telling Giulia that he felt depressed and suicidal, as he did not see a future without her. She and Turetta continued to meet up, but she confided that she experienced his pressure as emotional blackmail.

== Murder ==
On 11 November 2023, Cecchettin left home, accompanied by Turetta, at around 18:00 to go to a shopping centre in Marghera to buy a pair of shoes for her graduation. Turetta and Cecchettin also dined together at a McDonald's inside the shopping centre at around 21:02, with Giulia paying for both their meals with her credit card. They then left the building at approximately 22:30. At 22:43, Giulia sent her last message via WhatsApp to her older sister Elena, who was in Vienna at the time for university studies.

At around 13:30 the following day, Giulia's father Gino reported her missing at the local Carabinieri station. Elena posted appeals on social media for the public to locate the couple. A witness came forward reporting that at around 23:15 on 11 November, he had seen a violent argument between a boy and a girl from the balcony of his apartment, taking place in a car park about 150 metres from Giulia's family home in Vigonovo. The girl shouted for help and the witness called 112; none arrived as all units in the area were busy and the closest one was over 45 minutes away from the location. Later, security video footage from a factory located in the nearby town of Fossò showed Turetta violently hitting Cecchettin. When she tried to escape, Turetta hit her again from the back, then loaded her bleeding body into the boot of his black Fiat Punto.

A manhunt for Turetta was initiated and was extensively reported on by Italian media for one week. After it emerged that Turetta had crossed the border into Austria, Gino Cecchettin made announcements in English and German, asking the public's help to find Giulia. Italian law enforcement issued a European arrest warrant for Turetta on charges of kidnapping and murder.

Giulia's body was discovered near a lake in Barcis, Piancavallo on 18 November 2023 by the special dogs unit of the Civil Protection. The body was found inside a large nylon bag in a cave at 50 metres altitude, within a wooded area that is generally closed during the autumn-winter period for security reasons. An autopsy conducted on 1 December 2023 reported that Giulia's body had 25 – 30 stab wounds. Some of the wounds were defensive.

One week after the murder, Turetta was arrested in an emergency lane of a motorway near Leipzig, after his car had run out of petrol. His first words to officers upon being stopped were: "I am Filippo Turetta. I killed my girlfriend". On 25 November Turetta was extradited to Italy, on a special Air Force flight that landed in Venice, and incarcerated in Verona prison.

== Funeral and reactions ==
Turetta is often called a monster, but he isn't. A monster is an exception, someone outside of society, someone for whom society doesn't have to take any responsibility. But the responsibility is there. "Monsters" aren't ill: they are the healthy sons of the patriarchy and rape culture.

— Elena Cecchettin

On 20 November 2023, the Corriere della Sera published a letter by Giulia's older sister Elena, in which she denounced a society responsible for dismissing men who commit violent acts against women as "monsters" or mentally ill, stating that they were in fact the natural result of "patriarchy and rape culture". She invited all men to take responsibility, recalling friends and colleagues who displayed behaviours tolerated by society that could be the prelude to femicide, defined by her as "state murder" and a "crime of power" which society must be educated against.

Cecchettin's funeral was held at the Abbey of Santa Giustina in Padua, officiated by the bishop of Padua Claudio Cipolla, in the presence of approximately 8,000 people and civil and military authorities; the funeral was also aired on the main Italian television channels. Giulia is buried next to her mother Monica, who died of cancer in autumn 2022. Her father Gino delivered the eulogy, urging men to change their attitudes toward women.

== Trial ==
On 23 September 2024, the summary judgment trial of Filippo Turetta, accused of voluntary homicide, aggravated by malice aforethought, cruelty, brutality, stalking and improper disposal of a body, began in the Court of Venice, with the premise made by the prosecutor Bruno Cherchi that, "The trial is held to sanction personal responsibilities, it should not judge femicide or social phenomena. I hope that the media hype did not influence the defendant's choice not to appear at the first hearing." The Cecchettin family, represented by the attorney of Giulia's sister (Elena), joined the lawsuit, in addition to the municipalities of Vigonovo, where Giulia Cecchettin lived, and Fossò, where the murder took place. The jury of the court rejected the request by five women's defense associations to join the lawsuit. It was planned that the trial will take place in five hearings, that Turetta will be questioned on 25 and 28 October, waiving the possibility of cross-examination of evidence, and that the sentence will be issued on 3 December, after the discussion scheduled for 25 and 26 November.

During the first hearing, Turetta remained in the prison in Verona, and his parents were absent. The defendant had in fact asked to waive the first appearance, but asking to be questioned: "He is ready to take responsibility in front of the court, the community and the injured parties", according to his defense attorney Giovanni Caruso. The victim's father, Gino Cecchettin, was present in the courtroom, but he preferred to leave his children, Elena and Davide at home and he declared to the press: "I don't want revenge, I have nothing to say to Filippo, I can say that the trial doesn't interest me, for me it all ended on November 11th of a year ago."

As expected, Turetta was questioned during the hearing on 25 October, presenting a 40-page memorial in which he reconstructed what he had done, thus inducing the court to cancel the hearing on 28 October, as the questioning had been exhausted. During the hearing on 25 November 2024 (the International Day for the Elimination of Violence against Women) the public prosecutor asked for life imprisonment for Turetta. Turetta was sentenced to life imprisonment on 3 December 2024, and the trial was closed at first instance. The aggravating circumstances of premeditation, kidnapping, and concealed corpse were acknowledged, while stalking and cruelty were rejected.

== Aftermath and legacy ==
On 2 February 2024, in the presence of her relatives, the University of Padua conferred an honorary degree to Giulia Cecchettin. Gino Cecchettin published a book with the title Cara Giulia. Quello che ho imparato da mia figlia ("Dear Giulia. What I have learned from my daughter") about the memories of his daughter and how he lived with the grief of the loss. The book was released in Italy on 5 March 2024.

Gino Cecchettin, together with his two surviving children, Elena and Davide, created the Guilia Cecchettin Foundation in her name on 18 November 2024.

In November 2025, it was reported that a movie would be made based on Gino Cecchettin's book, with filming expected to begin in February 2026. That July, the trailer was released and was named Se domani non torno (If I Don't Return Tomorrow), produced by Notorius Pictures, directed by Paola Randi, with Sabrina Martina starring as Guilia. It was released in Italian cinemas on 5 November 2026.

== See also ==
- List of solved missing person cases (2020s)
