= 1991 in Italy =

- Decades: 1970s; 1980s; 1990s; 2000s; 2010s
- See also: History of Italy; Timeline of Italian history; List of years in Italy

Events in the year 1991 in Italy.

== Incumbents ==
- President – Francesco Cossiga
- Prime Minister – Giulio Andreotti

== Events ==
=== April ===
- 17 April: Murders of Antonio Maso and Mariarosa Tessari

=== July ===
- 10 July: Murder of Alberica Filo della Torre

== Deaths ==
- 2 January: Renato Rascel, actor (b. 1912)
- 2 February: Franco Latini, actor (b. 1927)
- 6 March: Salvo Randone, actor (b. 1906)
- 5 April: Renato Turi, actor (b. 1920)
- 2 May: Stefano D'Arrigo, writer (b. 1919)
- 2 June: Antonio Herin, Olympic cross-country skier (b. 1900)
- 2 July: Ermanno Scaramuzzi, foogtball player and coach (b. 1927)
- 2 August: Gianni Patrignani, Olympic swimmer (b. 1906)
- 6 September: Alfredo Rizzo, actor (b. 1902)
- 11 December: Mario Tobino, poet, writer and psychiatrist (b. 1910)

== See also ==
- List of Italian films of 1991
