= 1993 in Italy =

- Decades: 1970s; 1980s; 1990s; 2000s; 2010s
- See also: History of Italy; Timeline of Italian history; List of years in Italy

Events during the year 1993 in Italy.

== Incumbents ==
- President: Oscar Luigi Scalfaro
- Prime Minister:

- Giuliano Amato (until 28 April)
- Carlo Azeglio Ciampi (from 28 April)

== Events ==
- 15 January-Palermo: Totò Riina, head of the Cosa Nostra, is arrested by the carabinieri of the Special Operational Group. He had been a fugitive for 24 years
- 16 January- Florence: Pietro Pacciani is arrested on charges of being the monster of Florence.
- February 27 - Sanremo: at the 43rd edition of the Italian Song Festival, Enrico Ruggeri wins with Mistero.
- April 28 - the government led by Carlo Azeglio Ciampi, the first non-parliamentary Prime Minister in the history of the Italian Republic, takes office.
- April 29 - Rome: the Chamber of Deputies denies the authorization to proceed for some proceedings against the former secretary of the PSI Bettino Craxi. Following the vote, two ministers of the PDS and the green Rutelli leave the Ciamp government.
- April 30- Rome: PSI secretary Bettino Craxi is welcomed in front of the Hotel Raphael in Rome, where he lived, by numerous demonstrators who begin throwing coins at him in protest.
- May 14- in Rome there is an attack in via Fauro by the mafia.
- May 27 - Florence: massacre of Via dei Georgofili by Cosa Nostra. A car bomb explodes near the Uffizi Gallery: the toll is 5 dead and 30 injured. The Mafia is suspected.
- June 3 - Milazzo (ME): an explosion occurred inside the Mediterranean refinery kills seven workers.
- July 26- the Christian Democrats, uninterruptedly ruling party since the war, decides its formal dissolution to give life to the Italian Popular Party.
- July 27 - Milan: Massacre of Via Palestro by Cosa Nostra: a car bomb explodes in Via Palestro at the Contemporary Art Pavilion, causing 5 deaths (three firefighters, a municipal police officer and a street vendor) and 12 injured. A few minutes later two bombs explode in Rome at the Basilica of San Giovanni in Laterano and the Church of San Giorgio al Velabro.
- August 4- Rome: the new electoral law is approved, nicknamed "Mattarellum" after the rapporteur Sergio Mattarella.
- September 15- Venice: an Air Force aircraft crashes at the Venice-Tessera Airport. The accident causes the death of the three crew members.
- Palermo: the parish priest of the Brancaccio district, Don Pino Puglisi, a priest who has always been involved in the fight against the mafia, is assassinated.
- 7 October - Altamura, Apulia: the remains of the Man of Altamura (Homo arcaicus), the only one of its kind, come to light.

== Births ==
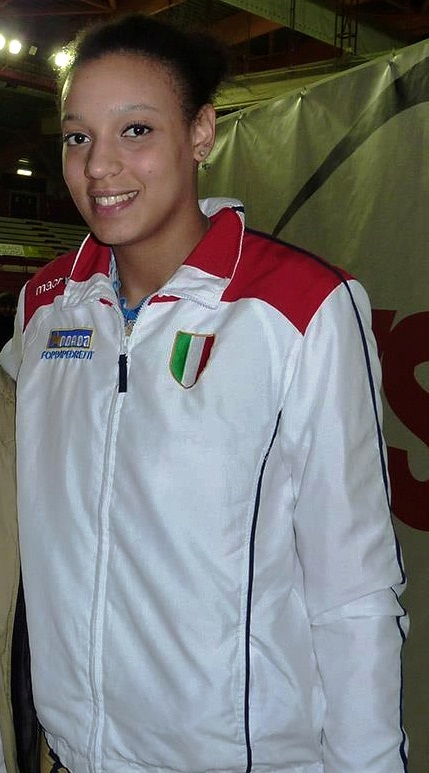
Valentina Diouf

- 8 January – Giovanni Galbieri, Italian sprinter
- 10 January – Valentina Diouf, volleyball player
- 21 January – Chiara Pierobon, cyclist (d. 2015)
- 15 January – Frank Fois, rock and blues guitarist, singer, and songwriter
- 15 February – Matteo Spreafico, cyclist
- 22 February – Nicole Murgia, actress
- 24 February – David Odiete, rugby union player
- 13 March – Michele Campagnaro, rugby union player
- 9 April – Matteo Zanusso, rugby union player
- 8 June – Carlo Pedersoli Jr., mixed martial artist
- 15 June – Charanjeet Singh, cricketer
- 5 August – Lorenzo Sommariva, snowboarder
- 10 September – Ruggero Pasquarelli, singer and actor.
- 20 September – Marvin Vettori, mixed martial artist
- 11 November – Vicky Piria, racing driver
- 29 November – Manuel Lazzari, footballer
- 2 December – Kevin Fischnaller, luger
- 25 December – Leonardo Basso, cyclist

== Deaths ==
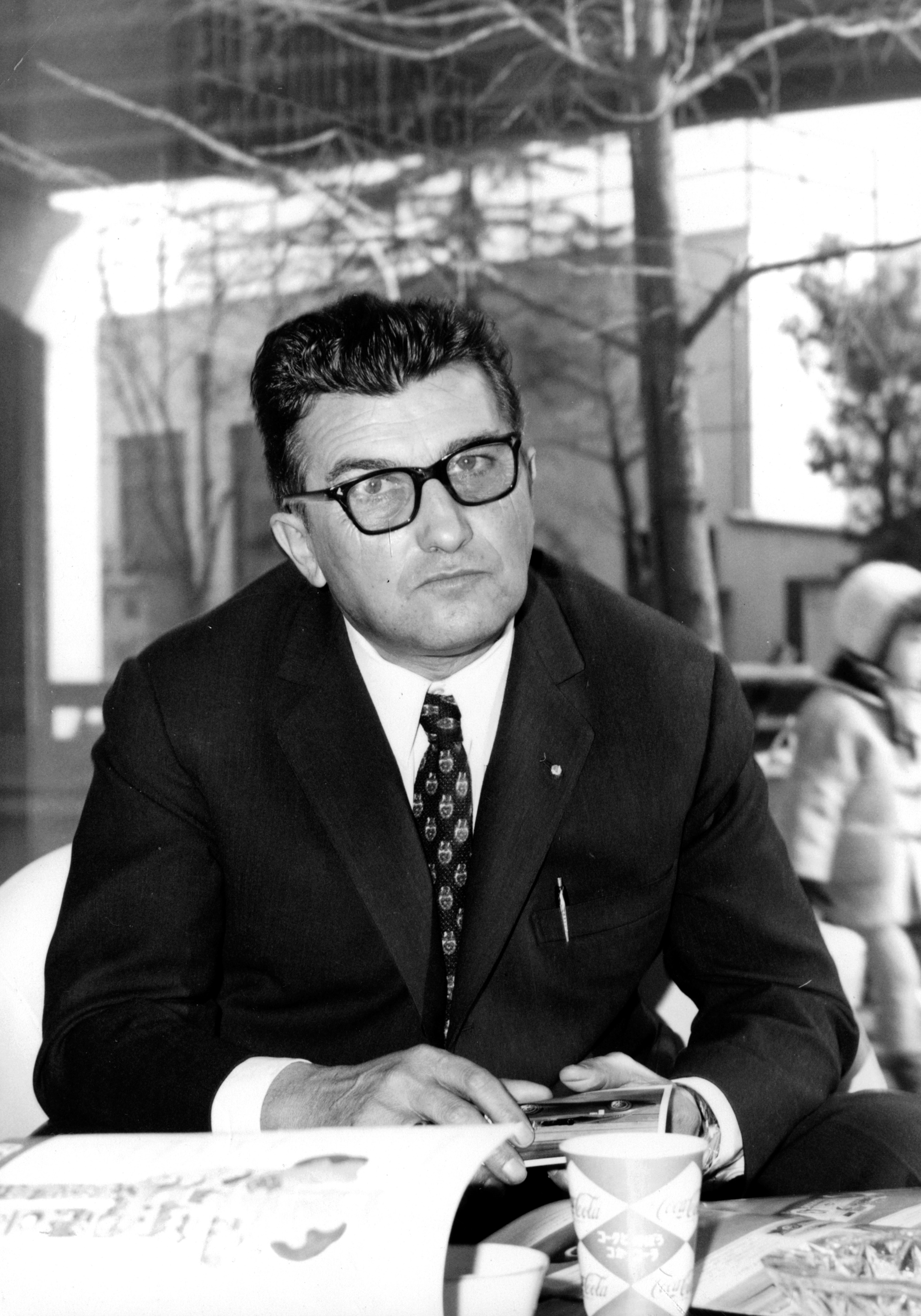
Ferruccio Lamborghini

- 1 January – Totò Mignone, dancer and actor (b. 1906)
- 3 February – Rosetta Calavetta, actress (b. 1914)
- 15 February – Enzo Boschetti, Roman Catholic priest (b. 1929)
- 20 February – Ferruccio Lamborghini, industrialist (b. 1916).
- 13 March – Gaetano Kanizsa, psychologist and artist (b. 1913)
- 12 May – Zeno Colò, alpine ski racer (b. 1920).
- 27 May – Tony Del Monaco, pop singer, and actor (b. 1935)
- 30 May – Gisella Floreanini, politician (born 1906)
- 19 June – Franco Scaglione, automobile coachwork designer (b. 1916)
- 9 August – Elena Fabrizi, actress (b. 1915)
- 15 September – Pino Puglisi, Roman Catholic priest (b. 1937).
- 29 September - Eugenio Pagnini, modern pentathlete (b. 1905)
- 1 October – Giuseppe Vari, film director (b. 1924)
- 31 October – Federico Fellini, film director (b. 1920)
- 5 November – Mario Cecchi Gori, film producer (b. 1920)
- 11 November – Franco Sassi, painter, printmaker and engraver (b. 1912)
- 15 November – Luciano Leggio, criminal (b. 1925)
- 23 December – Marcello Neri, cyclist (b. 1902)
