= 1989 in Italy =

- Decades: 1960s; 1970s; 1980s; 1990s; 2000s
- See also: History of Italy; Timeline of Italian history; List of years in Italy

Events in Italy in 1989:

== Incumbents ==
- President of Italy: Francesco Cossiga
- Prime Minister of Italy: Ciriaco De Mita until 22 July; after 22 July Giulio Andreotti

== Events ==
- 21 February - The Sanremo Music Festival 1989 opens at the Teatro Ariston in Sanremo.
- 24 May - AC Milan win the European Cup for the third time with a 4–0 victory over Romanian league champions Steaua Burcharest of in Barcelona.
- 18 June - The third elections for the European Parliament are held. A non-binding advisory referendum is held on the same day to re-affirm popular support for the process of European integration.

Date unknown

- VeniceArrhythmias, a biannual international workshop on cardiac arrhythmias, is founded.

== Sport ==
- 1989 Supercoppa Italiana
- 1989 Torneo di Viareggio
- 1989 Italian Grand Prix
- 1989 San Marino Grand Prix
- 1989 Italian motorcycle Grand Prix
- 1989 Giro d'Italia
- 1989 Italian Open (tennis)

== Film ==
- 53rd Venice International Film Festival

== Births ==
- 21 January - Matteo Pelucchi, cyclist
- 23 January - Alice Teghil, actress
- 18 March - Francesco Checcucci, footballer
- 11 May - Gianluigi Bianco, footballer
- 22 May - Aurora Ruffino, actress
- 9 August - Stefano Okaka, footballer

== Deaths ==
- 30 April - Sergio Leone, film director (b. 1929; heart attack)
- 12 August - Olga Villi, model and actress (b. 1922)
- 2 October - Vittorio Caprioli, actor, director and screenwriter (b. 1921)
