= 1990 in Italy =

- Decades: 1970s; 1980s; 1990s; 2000s; 2010s
- See also: History of Italy; Timeline of Italian history; List of years in Italy

Events in the year 1990 in Italy.

== Incumbents ==
- President – Francesco Cossiga
- Prime Minister – Giulio Andreotti

== Events ==
- 6 December - 1990 Italian Air Force MB-326 crash
- 13 December - 1990 Carlentini earthquake

== Deaths ==
- January 8 – Mario Brignoli, Olympic race walker (born 1902)
- February 1 – Gianfranco Contini, philologist (born 1913)
- March 10 – Giovanni Paganin, Olympic speed skater (born 1955)
- April 2 – Aldo Fabrizi, actor and film director (died 1905)
- May 2 – Giacomo Scalet, Olympic cross-country skier (born 1909)
- June 16 – Feliciano Monti, football player and manager (born 1902)
- July 15 – Luigi Rigamonti, Olympic wrestler (born 1920)
- August 3 – Nella Maria Bonora, actress (born 1904)
- September 4 – Giuseppe Gobbato, Olympic race walker (born 1904)
- December 14 – Pietro Tordi, actor (born 1906)

== See also ==
- List of Italian films of 1990
