= 1994 in Italy =

- Decades: 1970s; 1980s; 1990s; 2000s; 2010s
- See also: History of Italy; Timeline of Italian history; List of years in Italy

Events during the year 1994 in Italy.

== Incumbents ==
- President: Oscar Luigi Scalfaro
- Prime Minister:

- Carlo Azeglio Ciampi (until 10 May)
- Silvio Berlusconi (from 10 May)

== Events ==
- 27 March – The 1994 Italian general election is won by Silvio Berlusconi
- 10 April – Murder of Antonella Di Veroli
- 8 to 10 July – The 20th G7 summit was held in Naples.
- 17 July – Brazil wins the FIFA World Cup by defeating Italy, 3–2, following a penalty shootout in the final game at the Rose Bowl in Pasadena, California, USA.
- 11 September – The 1994 Italian Grand Prix, originally scheduled for 12 August, is held at Monza and won by Damon Hill.

== Births ==
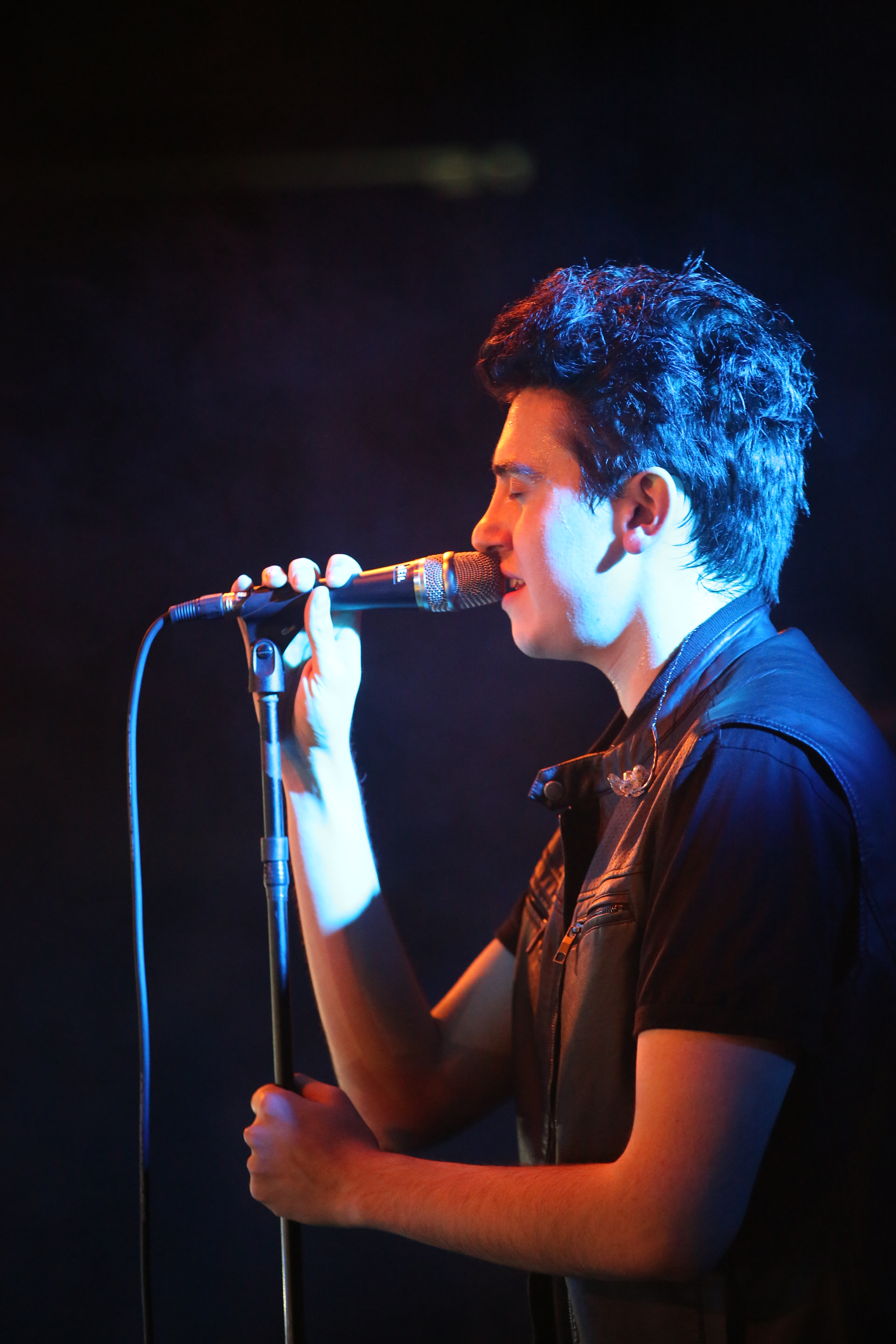
Michele Bravi

- 2 January – Adam Masina, footballer
- 16 February – Federico Bernardeschi, footballer
- 22 February – Tedua (Mario Molinari), rapper
- 17 March – Ivan Provedel, footballer
- 5 April – Simona Tabasco, actress
- 7 April – Roberto Gagliardini, footballer
- 5 May – Mattia Caldara, footballer
- 7 May – Graziano Di Prima, dancer and choreographer
- 11 May – Roberto Insigne, footballer
- 29 July – Daniele Rugani, footballer
- 4 November – Davide Leto, footballer
- 23 December – Michele Bravi, singer

== Deaths ==
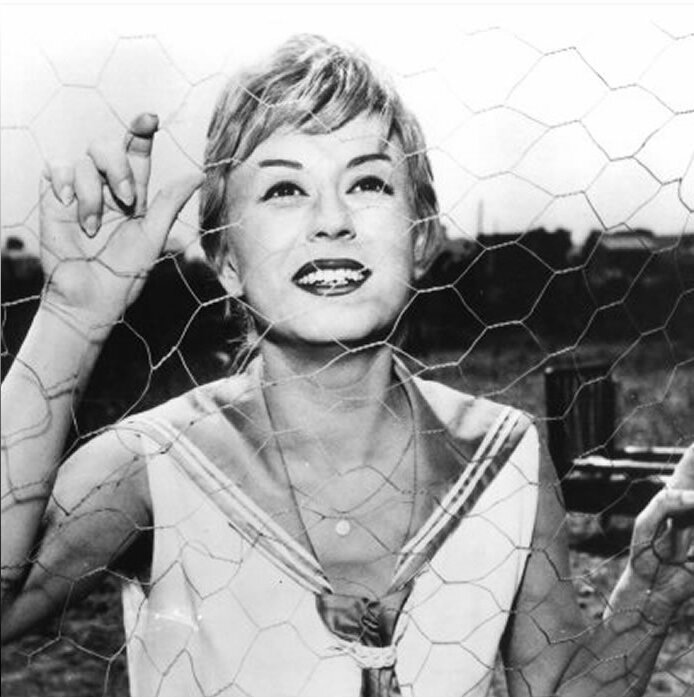
Giulietta Masina

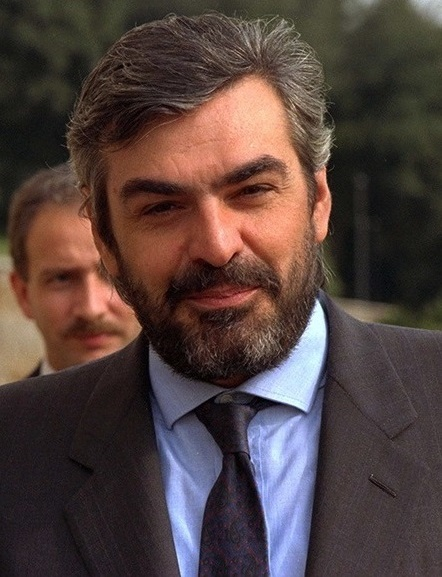
Giovanni Goria

- 23 March – Giulietta Masina, actress (b. 1921).
- 21 May – Giovanni Goria, politician, prime minister (b. 1943)
- 4 June – Massimo Troisi, actor, screenwriter, and film director (b. 1953)
- 4 August – Giovanni Spadolini, Prime Minister (b. 1925)
- 6 August – Domenico Modugno, singer-songwriter, actor and politician (b. 1928).
- 6 September – Duccio Tessari, director and screenwriter (b. 1926).
- 18 September – Franco Moschino, fashion designer (b. 1950).
- 6 December – Gian Maria Volonté, actor (b. 1933)
- 24 December – Rossano Brazzi actor (b. 1916).
- 26 December Sylva Koscina, actress (b. 1933).
