= Murders of Peter Neumair and Laura Perselli =

2021 double murder in Italy

- Native name: Omicidio di Peter Neumair e Laura Perselli
- Location: 22 Via Castel Roncolo, Runkelsteiner Straße, Bolzano, South Tyrol, Italy
- Date: 4 January 2021; 12:00PM - 4:00PM
- Attack type: Strangulation
- Weapon: Climbing rope
- Deaths: Peter Neumair, Laura Perselli
- Victims: 2
- Perpetrator: Benno Neumair
- Motive: Conflictual relationships
- Charges: Double murder

The murders of Peter Neumair and Laura Perselli, also known as the Bolzano crime or Bolzano murder, was a case of double parricide committed on the afternoon of 4 January 2021, at a villa in Bolzano, Italy against an elderly couple, Peter Neumair and Laura Perselli.

The couple's 31 year old son, Benno Neumair, was found responsible for the murders. He initially declared himself innocent but later confessed. After months of intensive searches on the ground, the bodies of both victims were found in the bed of the Adige river. The body of his mother, Laura Perselli, was the first to be located on 6 February, discovered lying on the bank of a river after investigators employed a complex hydraulic operation to purposely lower water levels by about 20 cm in the stretch between Bolzano and Rovereto. Following this discovery, Benno Neumair, already accused of double homicide and concealment of a corpse, confessed to the double crime. Three months later, the body of Peter Neumair was found on 27 April.

Benno Neumair was accused of strangulating his parents with a mountaineers rope and dumping their bodies in the Adige river.

On 12 September 2024, the Supreme Court of Cassation rejected the appeal filed by Benno Neumair's lawyers, making the life sentence already imposed in the first instance definitive.

== Background ==
=== Disappearance ===
On 5 January 2021, Benno Neumair, a 31-year-old teacher and body builder, went to the Carabinieri barracks in Bolzano to report the disappearance of his parents, Peter Neumair and Laura Perselli, aged 63 and 68. The family lived together in Bolzano, the capital of South Tyrol. The two missing persons were both retired teachers, and in the last period they had dedicated themselves to practicing some types of sports, in addition to walking every day in the mountains, which led investigators to initially hypothesise that the two had been victims of an accident in a mountain environment. A landslide, which had occurred on the same day, was investigated by police as another possible lead. It had destroyed part of the Hotel Eberle located near the city. During the initial investigation and searches, Benno cooperated with the investigators and provided information on the paths that his parents regularly took during their mountain walks. He also consented to the entry of sniffer dogs into the apartment where he lived with his parents.

Following further investigation, the Carabinieri discovered that both cell phones belonging to the victims had been turned off since the evening before their disappearance. After the Carabinieri searched the site of the landslide and failed to locate any relevant evidence or trace of the couple, they began investigating Benno. To ensure the veracity of Benno's reconstruction of events, the investigators collected testimonies regarding his character and personality. Investigators discovered that Benno had previously experienced a serious psychiatric episode that had led to his hospitalization in Germany, and had recently returned to live with his parents. As it later emerged, Benno had a strained relationship with his parents with alternating periods of dependence and estrangement when his requests were not met, resulting in heavy arguments between him and his parents. At the age of 21, he had developed a pathological approach to sports training and began to take steroids. During his stay in Germany, he had also threatened a girl he was living with. A psychiatric evaluation would later diagnose him with narcissistic personality disorder.

=== Investigation ===
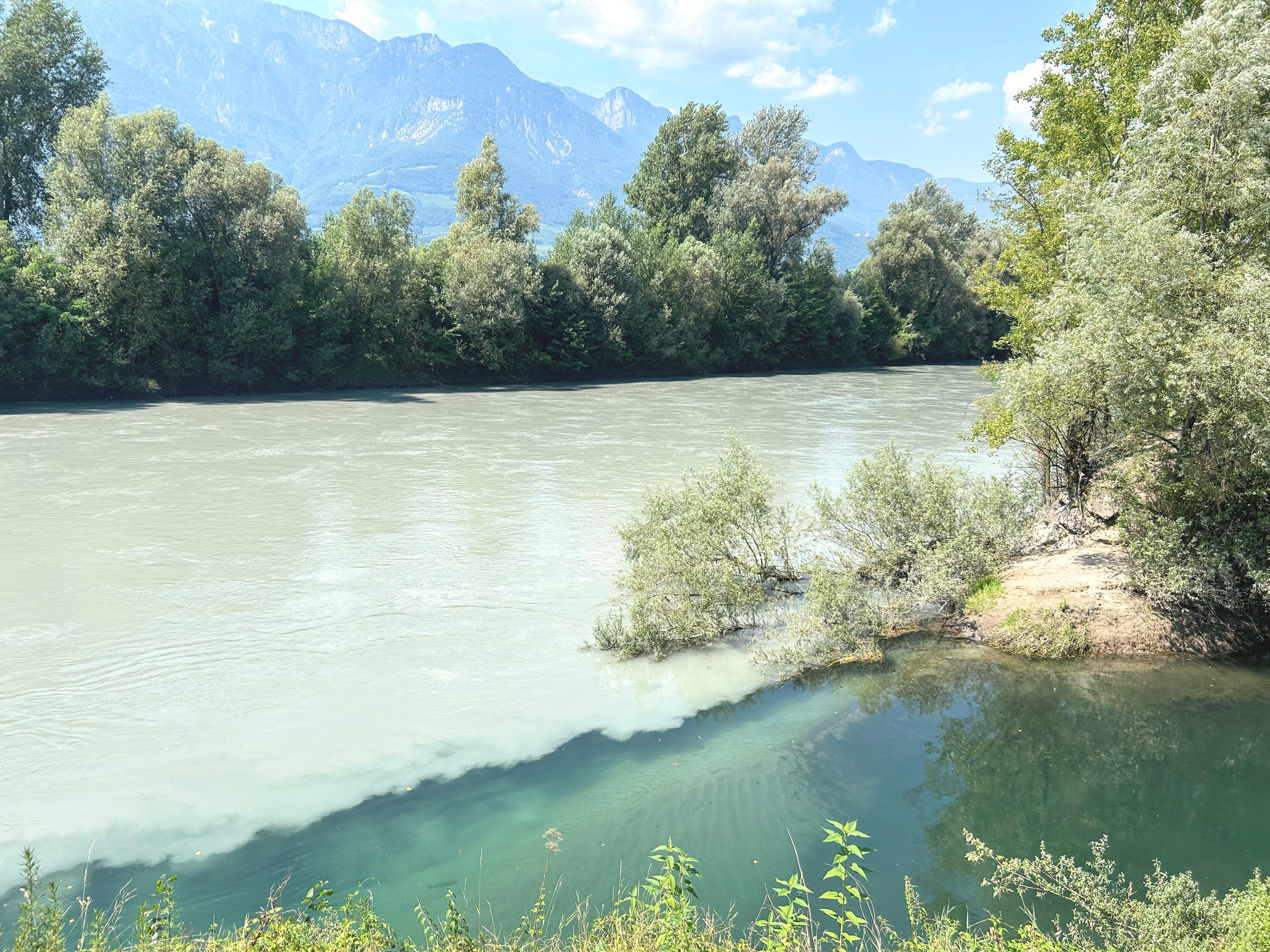
The Adige river south of Bolzano.

While the search for the missing couple was still ongoing, Benno was stopped by the Carabinieri at a car wash, shortly before his car was cleaned. The car was seized and, during checks in the trunk, investigators found a canister of hydrogen peroxide. Subsequently, on the north side of the Ischia Frizzi bridge, a yellowish blood stain was found; the investigators handed the sample over to the Scientific Investigations Department (RIS) for analysis, which revealed that the blood belonged to Mr. Peter Neumair. Having also acquired more information regarding the telephone usage, the investigators concluded that on the evening of the crime, Benno's mobile phone was located precisely at that point. After this discovery, Benno was entered in the register of suspects, accused of double homicide and concealment of a corpse. The evidence collected almost immediately led to the hypothesis that Benno had thrown his parents' bodies into the river, in order to erase any trace attributable to him.

The villa, which was owned by Benno and where he lived with his parents, was seized by police for further investigation. Subsequent inquiries revealed that on the night he committed the crime, Benno had gone to sleep at a female friend's house and provided her with some of his clothes to wash. As these clothes were allegedly hidden during the RIS inspection, the friend was initially considered a suspect, accused of aiding and abetting, but was later cleared of all charges. Investigators additionally assessed a different woman, a teacher who Benno had met on Tinder and entered into a relationship with, as another potential suspect. Following the disappearance of his parents, Benno had invited the woman to his home and made several requests, including asking her to assist him in cleaning the house.

Charged by the prosecution, on 28 January, 24 days after the crime, Benno showed up at the barracks to turn himself in, but proclaimed his innocence. Only on 11 February did he confess to the double homicide, claiming to have strangled both his parents with a climbing rope. Benno was subsequently subjected to a psychiatric assessment by the Preliminary Investigation Judge (GIP) experts, who assessed that the young man was semi-insane during the murder of his father Peter, while he would have been capable of understanding and willing during that of his mother. From this it was deduced that Benno had voluntarily killed his mother, probably to avoid her being an inconvenient witness. Subsequent investigations confirmed that the two victims both died by strangulation, through the use of a "cord", which Peter probably used during his mountain excursions. The two bodies were then loaded into the family car and taken to the bridge, and then thrown into the river one at a time. The entire investigation was completed in a short time. On 10 April 2021, Benno Neumair was sent for trial for the crimes of multiple homicide and concealment of a corpse. During the hearing, the request by Benno's lawyers to proceed with the abbreviated procedure was rejected; in fact, with the entry into force of law no. 33/2019, a summary judgment is not permitted for crimes punishable by life imprisonment.

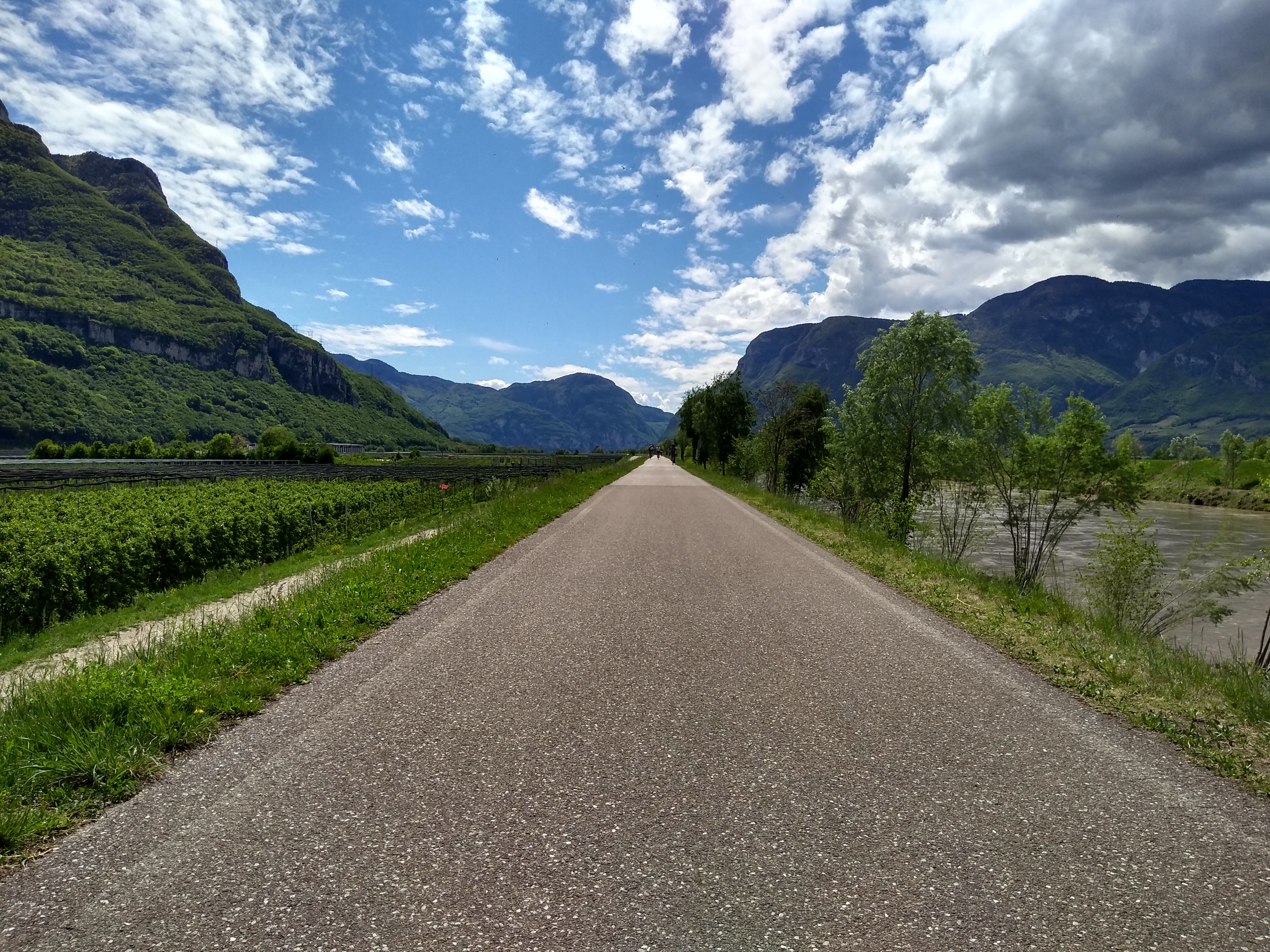
The river near Neumarkt where the body of Laura Perselli was found.

The search of the river continued around the area of the Mori dam. The body of Laura Perselli was found near Neumarkt on 6 February. Four months following the murders the body of Peter Neumair was found on 27 April. It was found at the Albere district of Trento. A boy was walking his dog in the area when he spotted a body on the surface of the water. The joint funeral of Peter Neumair and Laura Perselli was held on 18 June 2021.

== Trial ==
On 4 March 2022, the trial against Benno began before the Assize Court of Bolzano, on charges of double homicide and concealment of a corpse. The prosecution – represented by the PMs Igor Secco and Federica Iovene – asked for life imprisonment and one year of daytime isolation in prison. Defence lawyers Flavio Moccia and Angelo Polo, leveraging the defendant's spontaneous confession, and asked for mitigating circumstances to be granted. The life sentence was pronounced on 19 November 2022 by the Assize Court of Bolzano, presided over by Judge Carlo Busato, after several hours of meeting in the council chamber to deliberate.

This sentence was confirmed in October 2023 by the Court of Appeal of Bolzano and made irrevocable by the Supreme Court on 12 September 2024.

== In mass culture ==
- A book was written about the story by the journalist Matteo Macuglia, entitled Il male dentro, correspondent for the television programme Quarto grado.
- RAI dedicated two episodes of Un giorno in pretura to the case and Rete 4 dealt with it in the programme Quarto Grado.
- The podcast Benno - The darkness of Bolzano was created on this case.
- NZZ reported on the murder's psychological underpinnings.
- The murder of Peter Neumair and Laura Perselli gave rise to reactions on social networks, such as the creation of a fandom group dedicated to Benno Neumair. Although most of the contents were ironic, trolling or even critical of the choice to create the group, in other cases real love was expressed towards the perpetrator of the crime and in at least one case a member of the group went as far as to tattoo Neumair's face on his arm. This group has been seen as one of the most striking cases in Italy of hybristophilia, the attraction to criminals, although other scholars have rather emphasized the narcissistic and exhibitionist intentions on the part of the participants of the group.

== See also ==
- List of solved missing person cases (2020s)
- Murders of Antonio Maso and Mariarosa Tessari, 1991 parricide case in Italy
- Novi Ligure murder
