= Parma Calcio 1913 Youth Sector =

Parma Under-20s
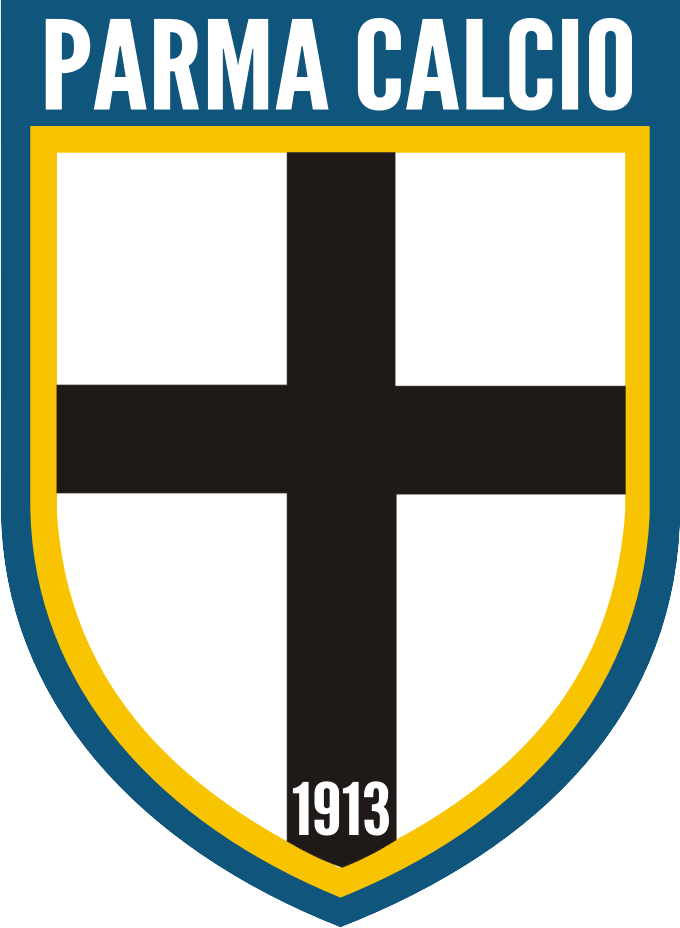
- Full name: Gli Juniores della S.S.D. Parma Calcio 1913
- Nickname: I Crociatini (The Young Crusaders)
- Ground: Centro Sportivo Parma Calcio, Collecchio
- Capacity: 1,200
- President: Kyle Krause
- Head coach: Nicola Corrent
- League: Campionato Primavera 1
- Website: www.parmacalcio1913.com/giovanili/
Home colours	Away colours	Third colours

Parma F.C. youth teams (it. i giovanili) form the youth set-up of S.S.D. Parma Calcio 1913, comprising six squads divided by age group: Juniores, Allievi, Regionali, Prof B Esordienti, and Pulcini.

== Juniores ==
The Juniores are the Parma football team composed of footballers between 17 and 20 years old, which is the most senior youth category according to Italian football's hierarchy. Each season, the squad is trialled for promotion to the first team before the beginning of the season. Players deemed ready for first team football are registered.

The team has competed in the Italian Campionato Nazionale Primavera, which has been known as the Trofeo Giacinto Facchetti since 2006, but has never won the title. The squad has also competed in the Coppa Italia Primavera, the national Italian youth cup competition, but have also failed to win that competition Having won neither of the two Italian Primavera competitions, Parma have never competed in the Supercoppa Primavera.

The closest the team has come to a major honour was in the Torneo di Viareggio, a major youth tournament contested by teams from all over the world, succumbing to a 3–1 defeat at the hands of Brescia Calcio in 1996. Appearances in the third place play-off of that competition have ended in a 1988 win on penalties over A.C. Milan and a 1–0 defeat to Internazionale in 1989. The play-off was abolished in 2009, but Parma did manage a fourth semi-final appearance in 2012, losing 1–0 to Juventus F.C.

=== Honours ===
- Torneo di Viareggio
  - Runners-up (1): 1996
- Torneo Città di Vignola
  - Winners (2): 2001, 2013

== Primavera ==
=== Current squad ===
As of 6 November 2026 Note: Flags indicate national team as defined under FIFA eligibility rules; some limited exceptions apply. Players may hold more than one non-FIFA nationality.

No.	Pos.	Nation	Player
1	GK	ITA	Alessandro Mazzocchi
3	DF	ITA	Lorenzo Marchesi
4	DF	CRO	Karlo Pajsar
5	DF	ITA	Ludovico Varali
6	DF	ITA	Vittorio Tognaccini
7	MF	ITA	Giorgio Chimezie
8	MF	ITA	Dario Pio D'Amico
9	FW	POR	Afonso Semedo
10	MF	ITA	Alessandro Ciardi
11	FW	GHA	Mama Opoku
13	DF	USA	Ryan Hartley
14	FW	SWE	Lukas Rosengren
17	FW	ITA	Filippo Alinovi
18	DF	ITA	Lorenzo Venturi
19	MF	ARG	Luca Scarlato
21	MF	ITA	Giovanni Parafioriti
22	FW	CRO	Andrija Burcar

No.	Pos.	Nation	Player
24	DF	AUT	Fabio Schreiber
25	MF	FRA	Doro Diop
26	DF	ITA	Giulio Brunori
28	MF	ITA	Davide Balduzzi
29	DF	ITA	Fallou Diagne
30	MF	ITA	Marco Campatelli
32	FW	ARG	Thomás de Martis (on loan from Lanús)
37	DF	ITA	Pietro Fiorasi
45	MF	ITA	Roberto Scaglione
46	DF	ITA	Djibril Diallo
72	MF	ITA	Abdelaziz Madiq
73	GK	ITA	Luca Costoli
79	FW	ROU	Ianis Avrămescu
82	DF	SUI	Gabriel Morisoli
92	MF	ITA	Andrea Brizi
97	FW	ITA	Francesco Arcuri
99	GK	ITA	Gabriele Casentini

=== Out on loan ===
As of 6 July 2026

Note: Flags indicate national team as defined under FIFA eligibility rules; some limited exceptions apply. Players may hold more than one non-FIFA nationality.

No. / Pos. / Nation / Player; — / GK / ITA / Gianluca Astaldi (at Pianese until 30 June 2027)	No. / Pos. / Nation / Player; — / DF / DOM / Marlon Mena (at Arezzo until 30 June 2027)

== Other youth teams ==
Below the Juniores, are the following youth teams:

- Allievi (under 17s)
  - League winners in 2003–04 and 2012–13
- Regionali (under 14s) – Players born in 2002
- Prof B (under 13s) – Players born in 2003
- Esordienti (under 12s) – Players born in 2004
- Pulcini (under 11s) – Players born in 2005

== Notable former players ==
Many players from Parma's youth teams go on to have careers in professional football, whether at Parma or at other clubs. The following is a list of players who have played in Serie A.

- (Nigeria) Ibrahim Babatunde
- (Italy) Simone Barone
- (Italy) Alessandro Bernardini
- (Italy) Luca Bucci
- (Italy) Gianluigi Buffon
- (Guinea) Ibrahima Camara
- (Italy) Alberto Cerri
- (Italy) Luca Cigarini
- (Italy) Roberto Colacone
- (Italy) Gianluca De Angelis
- (Italy) Alfonso De Lucia
- (France) Grégoire Defrel
- (Italy) Daniele Dessena
- (Italy) Gianluca Falsini
- (Italy) Ivan Franceschini
- (Italy) Niccolò Galli
- (Italy) Marcello Gazzola
- (Italy) Abel Gigli
- (Italy) Pietro Lorenzini
- (Italy) Carlalberto Ludi
- (Italy) Matteo Mandorlini
- (Italy) Leandro Martínez
- (Italy) Alessandro Melli
- (Italy) Vittorio Mero
- (Italy) Francesco Montervino
- (Italy) Nicola Mora
- (Italy) Enrico Morello
- (Italy) Federico Moretti
- (Italy) Daniele Paponi
- (Italy) Riccardo Pasi
- (Italy) Stefano Pioli
- (Italy) Filippo Porcari
- (Switzerland) Aleksandar Prijović
- (Italy) Alessandro Rosina
- (Italy) Giuseppe Rossi
- (Italy) Marco Rossi
- (Italy) Francesco Ruopolo
- (Italy) Filippo Savi
- (Italy) Tonino Sorrentino
- (Italy) Emiliano Tarana
- (Italy) Roberto Vitiello
- (Italy) Davide Zoboli
