= Marlon Mena =

Dominican footballer (born 2006)

Personal information
- Full name: Marlon Mena Martínez
- Date of birth: 5 October 2006 (age 20)
- Place of birth: Parma, Italy
- Height: 1.88 m (6 ft 2 in)
- Position: Right-back

Team information
- Current team: Arezzo (on loan from Parma)
- Number: 2

Youth career
- Parma

Senior career*
Years	Team	Apps	(Gls)
2026–	Parma	0	(0)
2026–	→ Arezzo (loan)	0	(0)

International career^{‡}
2023	Dominican Republic U17	1	(0)
2024	Dominican Republic U20	3	(0)
2025–	Dominican Republic	4	(0)
- * Club domestic league appearances and goals as of 23:14, 8 October 2025 (UTC) ‡ National team caps and goals as of 10:25, 3 April 2026 (UTC)

Marlon Mena Martínez (born 5 October 2006) is a professional footballer who plays as a right-back for Serie B club Arezzo, on loan from Parma. Born in Italy, he plays for the Dominican Republic national team.

== Club career ==
A youth product of Parma, Mena was assigned to their Campionato Primavera 1 team for the 2025–26 season.

On 6 July, Mena extended his contract with Parma, until 30 June 2029. On the same day, he was sent to Arezzo, on loan for the 2026–27 season.

== International career ==
Born in Italy, Mena is of Dominican descent and holds dual Italian and Dominican citizenship. He was called up to the Dominican Republic U17s for the 2023 CONCACAF U-17 Championship. The following year, he was part of the Dominican Republic U20s for the 2024 CONCACAF U-20 Championship. He debuted with the senior Dominican Republic national team in a friendly 3–0 loss to Jordan on 9 September 2025.
