= 1992 in Italy =

- Decades: 1970s; 1980s; 1990s; 2000s; 2010s
- See also: History of Italy; Timeline of Italian history; List of years in Italy

Events in Italy in 1992:

== Incumbents ==
- President of Italy: Francesco Cossiga (until April) Oscar Luigi Scalfaro (until may)
- Prime Minister of Italy: Giuliano Amato

== Events ==
- 13 January – The first edition of TG5, Canale 5's news program, was broadcast in Italy.
- 29 February – Sanremo: at the 42nd edition of the Italian Song Festival Luca Barbarossa wins with Portami a ballare.
- 5 April – political elections: the Quadripartite obtains an absolute majority with 48.55% of the votes, but the growth of the Lega Nord and the first investigations into bribes make it difficult to form a stable government.
- 31 October – the Catholic Church rehabilitates the Italian scientist Galileo Galilei, convicted in 1633.

== Births ==
- 12 September – Mahmood, singer
- 27 October – Stephan El Shaarawy, footballer
- 5 November – Marco Verratti, Italian footballer
- 24 December – Giuseppe Durato, manga artist

== Deaths ==
- 3 March – Lella Lombardi, racing driver (b. 1941)
- 8 April – Daniel Bovet, Swiss-born scientist, Nobel Prize laureate (b. 1907)
- 23 May – Giovanni Falcone, magistrate, assassinated, car bomb. (b. 1939)
- 19 July – Paolo Borsellino, magistrate, assassination by car bomb (b. 1940)
- 29 November – Emilio Pucci, fashion designer and politician (b. 1914)
