= Murders of Antonio Maso and Mariarosa Tessari =

1991 criminal case in Italy

- Location: 4 Via San Pietro, Montecchia di Crosara
- Date: 17 April 1991
- Attack type: double homicide
- Deaths: 2
- Victims: Antonio Maso; Mariarosa Tessari
- Perpetrators: Peter Maso; Damiano Burato; Paul Cavazza; Giorgio Carbognin
- Motive: Taking possession of the inheritance

The murders of Antonio Maso and Mariarosa Tessari, also known as the Maso case, and known in Italian as omicidio dei coniugi Maso or the Montecchia di Crosara crime, was a case of double parricide committed on 17 April 1991 in Montecchia di Crosara, in the province of Verona. The crime is remembered as one of the most emblematic cases of children killing their parents, on a par with the Graneris case of 1975 and the Novi Ligure murder of 2001.

In order to get his share of inheritance, nineteen-year-old Pietro Maso killed both his parents Antonio Maso and Mariarosa Tessari. He was helped by three friends: Giorgio Carbognin (18 years old), Paolo Cavazza (18 years old) and Damiano Burato (17 years old). He was arrested on 19 April 1991 and then definitively sentenced to thirty years in prison, with the recognition of semi-mental infirmity at the time of the crime; after having spent twenty-two years as a prisoner, he was released in 2013, he underwent rehabilitation in a psychiatric clinic in 2016, and then became a gardener and carried out social reintegration activities in a non-profit organization (ONLUS).

His accomplices, Giorgio Carbognin and Paolo Cavazza, were sentenced to twenty-six years, while the minor Damiano Burato was sentenced to thirteen years.

== Events ==
=== Background ===
The victims, Antonio and Rosa, were well-off farmers with three children. They had two daughters, Nadia and Laura, and a son, Pietro. The daughters married in their twenties and moved out to live elsewhere. Pietro enrolled at the agricultural institute but dropped out in the third year. He was expelled from the seminary and exempted from military service continuing to live with his parents and lead a highly expensive life together with a group of friends. In the months leading up to the crime, his parents seemed more worried than usual as Pietro had left his job as a clerk in a supermarket and even his occasional collaboration with a car dealership. Furthermore, on 3 March 1991, the mother found in the cellar of the house two gas cylinders with a control unit for psychedelic disco lights and an alarm clock set a few minutes after the discovery, as well as cushions blocking the fireplace. All seemed to be part of a system that was supposed to cause an explosion to kill the parents. Pietro justified himself to his mother by telling her that everything was needed for a party.

The explosion did not occur because the safety valves on the cylinders had been removed and they remained closed, and due to his inexperience, Pietro did not carry out his first plan to exterminate his family. In an autobiographical book published decades later, he said instead that he lacked the courage to carry out the original plan.

A few days before the crime, Rosa found approximately 2 million lire in her son's trouser pocket. As he was not in a position to have such a large sum of money his mother asked him for an explanation and Pietro replied that it was the last commissions that his last employer had just given him and, indeed, suggested that she go and ask for confirmation of this at the car dealership. Rosa accepted and had her son and Giorgio Carbognin accompany her in the car, who, armed with a meat tenderizer, was supposed to kill his mother. However, he lacked the courage and Pietro was forced to invent another lie about the banknotes so that Rosa would not speak to the owner of the car dealership.

A third attempt saw Giorgio Carbognin once again give up. He supposedly planned to hit Pietro's parents in the garage of their house, but Carbognin lacked the courage to perform the act.

=== Murders ===
The banknotes found by Maso's mother came from a bank loan taken out by Giorgio Carbognin, for which his employer, Aleardo Confente, had acted as guarantor. The money was originally intended to be used by the young man to buy a used car; however, Giorgio's family subsequently opposed the purchase, and the boy gave up the car but did not return the money to the bank. He and Pietro squandered it on restaurants, nightclubs, bars, and jewelry stores.

When it was time to return the money, Carbognin asked his friend for help, who decided to write a cheque for 25 million from his mother's account, imitating her signature; the crime therefore had to be carried out before the mother noticed the shortage in the account. Maso, worried that his parents would cut off his supply of food this time, decided to kill them and, together with his friends, organised a plan that would guarantee the accomplices a share of the inheritance: 200 million each for Cavazza and Burato and the rest divided equally between him and Carbognin. The crime was committed during the night between Wednesday 17 and Thursday 18 April 1991. That evening Maso, Carbognin, Cavazza and Burato met to discuss the final details. With them was a fifth friend, Michele, who had been informed of the plan so that he would take part in it but thought it was a joke so much so that he accompanied them to Maso's house and later left, continuing to not believe his friends. At 11pm Pietro's parents, who had taken part in a meeting of the Neocatechumenal Way, returned home. When the couple entered, the father tried in vain to turn on the light but the bulb had been unscrewed by his son. Thinking it was a power problem, he ascended the stairs to reach the meter on the first floor and, having arrived in the kitchen, was hit by his son with an iron pipe and by Damiano with a saucepan. The two then kicked him in the head. Shortly afterwards his mother arrived and suffered the same fate. She did not die instantly and was then suffocated with cotton wool in her throat.

After the murder, Maso and Carbognin went to a disco to create an alibi while Cavazza and Burato returned home. After a few hours, Maso returned home to stage a fake discovery, telling the neighbors that he had seen his parents' legs lying on the floor. The bodies were then discovered by one of the neighbors who entered the house to verify what Maso had said.

== Investigation ==
At first, as the boys had hoped, the trail of a murder for the purpose of robbery was followed by police, but it was soon discovered that it was a staged burglary. The sisters, Nadia and Laura, became suspicious when they discovered that 25 million lira had been withdrawn from their mother's account. The investigations, however, facilitated by the fact that the same friends had begun to go around talking about the fact, as well as Maso's strange behaviour after the crime, led to his arrest first and then to the rest of the accomplices; Maso confessed shortly after the arrest.

All of them were arrested for voluntary homicide, a charge which at the end of the investigation became double premeditated voluntary homicide with multiple aggravating factors. The aggravating factors were in fact cruelty, futile motives and, in the case of Pietro, also the family ties. For the psychiatric assessment, requested by the public prosecutor Mario Giulio Schinaia, the psychiatrist, teacher and writer from Verona Vittorino Andreoli was called.

The professor's verdict contemplated the sanity of the three adult defendants (Burato, not yet an adult, would be judged by the juvenile court which would sentence him to thirteen years) and therefore the full capacity to understand and to want.

At the trial, at the Corte d'Assise of Verona, the public prosecutor requested life imprisonment for Maso and just under thirty years for the other two. The sentence was issued on 29 February 1992, with Pietro Maso condemned to thirty years of imprisonment with the recognition of semi-infirmity, Cavazza and Carbognin were condemned to 26 years each, a sentence later confirmed in the subsequent levels of judgement.

For several months, Maso demanded his share of the inheritance; only the urging of his defense attorney, in order to increase his chances of avoiding a life sentence in the first instance, convinced him to officially renounce it.

In 1996 Maso wrote a letter to the bishop of Vicenza Pietro Giacomo Nonis, stating that he felt repentant and asking God for forgiveness. The bishop himself (who performed the funeral of the Maso couple) went to the prison in Milan to speak with the young man and understand the reason for his actions.

Pietro Maso served his sentence in semi-liberty in the prison of Opera, in the province of Milan. In the past he had obtained some special permits: the first in autumn 2006 and the second, for Easter, from 7 to 9 April 2007. With the pardon, the official term of his sentence was set for 2015 and rather than 2018. Maso had taken part in re-education programmes, studied and had returned to faith. He had also participated in a musical theatre course (including a performance of the famous musical Jesus Christ Superstar in which he played an angel).

In the interview with La Repubblica on 5 February 2007, Maso declared that many young people write to him because they would have liked to do what he had done, and that he invited them to hold back and try to mend their relationships: "I couldn't save myself: at least I try with others". However, the writer Cinzia Tani, an expert in the social history of crime, states that "in prison his worries are the care of his person, from perfume to tanning lotion, from gymnastics to sunbathing. He doesn't feel any remorse. He receives letters from thousands of fans".

On 14 October 2008, Maso was granted semi-liberty by the Milan Surveillance Court. From 22 October 2008, he worked in Peschiera Borromeo in a now-defunct computer and component assembly company, Elettrodata Spa, leaving at 7:30 am and having to return to prison by 10:30 pm. On his first day at work, there was no shortage of journalists and onlookers outside the company. A passer-by shouted, "Kill him, that murderer".

The end of the sentence was scheduled for 2018, but was later advanced to 2015. On 15 April 2013 Pietro Maso was released and began to work for the Catholic broadcaster Telepace, followed by the director and spiritual father Don Guido Todeschini. In April 2013 the book written together with the journalist Raffaella Regoli was published, entitled Il male ero io (Mondadori), where he recounts the crime, but above all his journey which he defines as one of redemption during the twenty-two years in prison.

On 21 January 2016, the Verona Public Prosecutor's Office entered Pietro Maso in the register of suspects on charges of attempted extortion. His sisters, threatened by him, were placed under police protection. On 4 March 2016 he was admitted to a psychiatric hospital for mental disorders and cocaine addiction. On 16 April 2016, the newspaper Libero published a letter written by Pietro Maso to Manuel Foffo. On 29 July 2020, Il Messaggero, anticipating the newspaper Oggi and quoting it, announced that Pietro Maso had been receiving citizen's income since 2019.

== Cultural influence ==
The "Maso case" has sparked numerous debates in newspapers and on television. The last homicide case so brutal to receive such widespread media attention was, up until that point, the Graneris case, a crime committed by eighteen-year-old Doretta Graneris from Vercelli, who, together with her boyfriend, killed her father, mother, grandparents, and brother in 1975. After the Maso case, another case that generated equal media attention was the Novi Ligure murder in 2001, committed by then sixteen-year-old Erika.

- The 1994 film by Luciano Manuzzi, I pavoni, was inspired by the case.
- In 1995 the cartoonist Paolo Bacilieri published l'albo The Supermaso attitude, in which he discussed the event.
- In 1995, the cartoonist Paolo Bacilieri published the comic book The Supermaso attitude, in which he jokes about the story.
- In October 2019, the documentary entitled Pietro Maso - Io ho ucciso was broadcast on channel Nove, where Maso himself was interviewed and retraced the events of that night.
- Pietro Maso's name is mentioned by Fabri Fibra in the song Controcultura included in the album of the same name, by Dargen D'Amico in the song Low Cash included in Di vizi di forma virtù and by Claver Gold in the song Minosse from the album Infernvm; it also appears in the lyrics of the song No Game Freestyle by Fedez and Tha Supreme, released on 26 May 2021. In September 2021 Pietro Maso reported Fedez for defamation, arguing: "The dramatic personal and procedural story in which I was involved is explicitly recalled," writes Maso in the complaint, "and which, after years and a tiring and painful personal journey, I managed to overcome". The case was archived by the investigating judge of Rome, Maria Gaspari in February 2024.

== See also ==
- Murders of Peter Neumair and Laura Perselli, 2021 parricide case in Italy
- Caso Carretta
- Caso Graneris
- Delitto di Novi Ligure
- Delitto di Paderno Dugnano
- Parricidio
- Processo mediatico
- I pavoni

== Bibliography ==
- Gianfranco Bettin (1992). L'erede: Pietro Maso, una storia dal vero. Milano: Feltrinelli. ISBN 978-88-07-12002-2.
- Vittorino Andreoli (1994). Il caso Maso. Roma: Editori Riuniti. ISBN 978-88-359-3825-5.
- AA.VV. (2003). I veri «gialli» della nera. Milano: RCS Periodici.
- Pietro Maso con Raffaella Regoli (2013). Il male ero io. Milano: Arnoldo Mondadori Editore. ISBN 978-88-520-3790-0.
