= Davide Leto =

Italian footballer (born 1994)

Personal information
- Full name: Davide Leto
- Date of birth: 4 November 1994 (age 32)
- Place of birth: Crotone, Italy
- Height: 1.71 m (5 ft 7 1/2 in)
- Position: Midfielder

Team information
- Current team: AEK Crotone

Youth career
- Crotone

Senior career*
Years	Team	Apps	(Gls)
2013–2016	Crotone	2	(0)
2014–2015	→ Martina Franca (loan)	6	(0)
2016–2017	Avezzano	30	(9)
2017–2018	FC Isola Capo Rizzuto	9	(1)
2018	Torres	14	(1)
2018–2019	Campobasso	7	(0)
2019–	FC Isola Capo Rizzuto		
- * Club domestic league appearances and goals as of 15:46, 17 January 2020 (UTC)

Davide Leto (born 4 November 1994) is an Italian professional footballer who plays as a midfielder for AEK Crotone.

== Career ==
Born in Crotone, Leto finished his graduation in hometown's Crotone's youth system, and made his first-team debut on 13 May 2013, coming on as a second-half substitute in a 1–1 draw at Varese.

He appeared in his second match six days later, again from the bench, in a 3–3 home draw against Juve Stabia.

On 16 August 2019, Leto returned to FC Isola Capo Rizzuto for the second time.
