= Murder of Antonella Di Veroli =

1994 murder in Rome, Italy

- Location: 8 Via Domenico Oliva, Rome, Italy
- Date: 10 April 1994
- Target: Antonella Di Veroli
- Attack type: shooting, suffocation
- Weapons: gun, plastic bag
- Deaths: 1
- Perpetrator: unknown
- Motive: unknown

On 10 April 1994, 47-year-old Antonella Di Veroli was killed in her home in Rome, Italy. The crime is unsolved as of 2026.

== Crime ==
Di Veroli worked as an employment consultant. She was killed in her home by asphyxiation on 10 April 1994. The killer had shot her in the head with a small calibre pistol, while she was still lying on the bed, before suffocating her with a plastic bag. The two shots had been non-fatal. An autopsy revealed she had taken a hypnotic before her death. The body was then hidden in the bedroom wardrobe and the door was sealed with mastic.

On 12 April, Di Veroli's sister came to look for her after she did not answer the phone. Her sister left after not finding her. Shortly after, her ex-boyfriend and business partner, Umberto Nardinocchi, arrived at her house together with his son and a friend, a police inspector. Upon entering the apartment, they noticed it was unusually messy, but otherwise nothing suggested a crime had happened. Nardinocchi returned around midnight hoping to find her but found nothing. The next morning, her sister and her husband searched the apartment, wearing rubber gloves so as not to contaminate the scene. After searching all the rooms, they looked in the bedroom wardrobe after noticing one of the doors had been closed with putty. When they managed to open it they discovered the body of Antonella Di Veroli.

== Investigations ==
Investigations at the time focused on two men who had had a relationship with the victim. The first suspect was Nardinocchi, an older colleague of the victim (who was acquitted at the end of the preliminary investigation), the second was Vittorio Biffani (1942–2003), a photographer with whom Antonella Di Veroli had had a relationship shortly before which had ended abruptly and to whom she had lent 42 million lire, which had never been returned.

The trail of a third suspect remained, and was made concrete by the numerous clues underestimated in the first phase of the investigation and which came to light during the trial in the assize court. With the new techniques on DNA and fingerprints meant the case could be potentially solvable.

== Trial ==
Biffani was sent for trial and tried together with his wife, who was accused of having threatened and attempted to extort money from her husband's ex-lover with a series of falsified and recorded phone calls to be used as blackmail. The trial began in 1995 and in 1997 the couple was acquitted, which was confirmed on appeal and by the Supreme Court in 2003. The man was also cleared of the charges by a fingerprint found on a wardrobe belonging to a third person who was never identified and by the evidence of the paraffin glove which, initially positive, later proved to be unreliable. Despite an attempt to reopen the case in 2011, no further developments were ever made and the case remained unsolved.

== In the media ==
The episode "The Mystery of the Locked Room" of the documentary series Blu notte - Misteri italiani, broadcast in 2000, focuses on the reconstruction of the events. The journalist Mauro Valentini is also the author of an investigative book on the case, 40 steps: the murder of Antonella Di Veroli, published in 2014.
