= Frank Fois =

Italian guitarist and singer

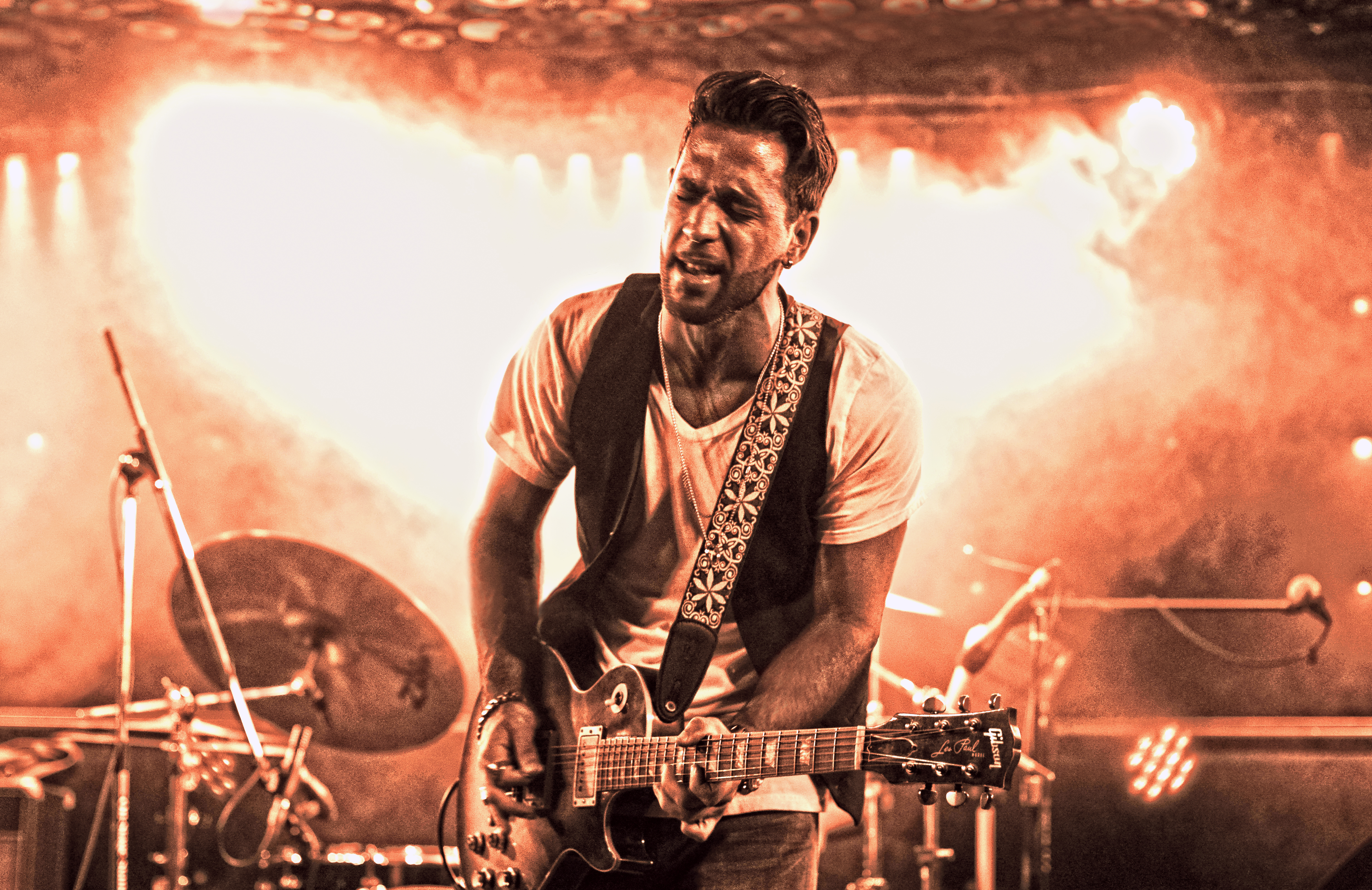
- Fois playing live in Miami in 2018

Background information
- Born: January 15, 1993 (age 32); Sassari, Italy
- Genres: Blues; rock; pop
- Occupations: Musician, Singer, Songwriter
- Instruments: Guitar, Vocals
- Years active: 1996–present
- Labels: FFI Entertainment
- Website: www.frankfois.com

Frank Fois (born January 15, 1993) is an Italian rock and blues guitarist, singer, and songwriter from Sassari, Italy.

== Career ==
Fois started to play the guitar at three years old, and soon he showed a passion for music especially for the blues. He performed for the first time in Sardinia, in a concert organized by UNICEF where he played some original songs. After that, he played in many others theatres of Italy.

At age six, Fois did his first studio recording. Soon after, he participated in several competitions in Italy and finished as the winner.

Fois started attending the Conservatory of Music in 2006 studying classical guitar. During his Music tour in 2013, Fois performed in Australia, the United States and in different European Countries: Germany, France, United Kingdom, Italy.

After moving to New York City in 2014, Fois performed in the blues clubs of Manhattan and Long Island including the "BB King Blues Club", Terra Blues, Rockwood Music Hall, and many others, also jamming with various well known musicians.

In 2015 Fois founded his own Entertainment company, "FFI Entertainment".

== Discography ==
- Red House (2015)
- World Keep on Turning (2015)
- Greatest Hits - Live in NYC (2016)
