= Feliciano Monti =

Italian footballer and manager

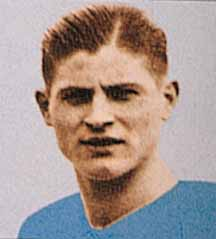

Personal information
- Full name: Feliciano Monti
- Date of birth: 19 December 1902
- Place of birth: Fratta Polesine, Italy
- Date of death: 16 June 1990 (aged 87)
- Place of death: Padua, Italy
- Position: Forward

Senior career*
Years	Team	Apps	(Gls)
1919–1927	Padova	143	(32)
1927–1933	Torino	161	(10)
1933–1936	Padova	48	(3)

International career
1923–1924	Italy	3	(0)

Managerial career
- 1946: Padova
- * Club domestic league appearances and goals

Feliciano Monti (Italian pronunciation: [feliˈtʃaːno ˈmonti]; 19 December 1902 – 16 June 1990) was an Italian association football manager and footballer who played as a forward. He played for the Italy national football team three times, the first being on 4 March 1923, the occasion of a friendly match against Hungary in a 0–0 home draw. He was also part of the Italy national squad for the football tournament at the 1924 Summer Olympics, but he did not play.
