= Murder of Alberica Filo della Torre =

1991 criminal case in Italy

- Location: Olgiata, Rome, Italy
- Date: 10 July 1991; 8:45 a.m. – 9:15 a.m.
- Target: Alberica Filo della Torre
- Attack type: strangulation
- Deaths: 1
- Injuries: jewellery theft
- Perpetrator: Manuel Winston Reyes
- Motive: Resentment for dismissal and robbery

The Murder of Alberica Filo della Torre (Delitto dell'Olgiata; Olgiata crime) was a murder of 42 years old 'Alberica Filo della Torre' committed on July 10, 1991, in a villa in Olgiata Rome, Italy. This case remained unsolved for 20 years, mainly because the investigation was somewhat inaccurate, until in 2011 DNA evidence pointed to Manuel Winston Reyes, a Filipino man with a degree in naval engineering who worked as a domestic servant and was a former employee of the family, who then confessed to the murder on April 1, 2011. The abbreviated trial handed down 16 years of imprisonment on November 14, 2011, confirmed on October 9. He was released on October 11, 2021, after ten years, for good behavior and sentence reductions.

== History ==
Alberica Filo della Torre was the daughter of Rear Admiral Ettore Filo della Torre (1908–1989) and Anna del Pezzo di Cajanello (1917–2017), a wealthy woman of Roman upper class who committed herself to the support and aid of charitable works. Alberica Filo della Torre was born in Rome on 2 April 1949, of the branch of the Counts of Torre Santa Susanna of the noble Neapolitan Filo family, and was first married to Don Alfonso de Liguoro of the princes of Presicce, a marriage subsequently declared null by the Roman Rota, and then, in Rome on 10 July 1981, to entrepreneur and former managing director of Vianini, Pietro Mattei. She was the mother of two children, Manfredi and Domitilla.

On the morning of the offence, the woman was in her residence at Olgiata, whilst her husband was at his place of employment. In the villa, there were her two offspring, two Filipino servants, the English babysitter Melanie Uniacke, and four laborers who were preparing for the celebration of the couple's marriage anniversary that evening. The preparations for the evening party began in the villa via the four laborers between 7:00 am and 7:30 am. Meanwhile, the countess and her two offspring also awakened according to the testimony of the maid Violeta Alpaga. In fact, it was the maid herself that took breakfast to the woman at around 7:45 am and then went back to the kitchen. Again according to the witness account, the countess went downstairs around 8:30 am and returned to her room at about 8:45 am. The countess did not exit her room alive thereafter. At around 9:15 am, the maid and little Domitilla knocked for the first time at the door to the room which was locked from the inside, without receiving a response.

Later, at approximately 10:30-11:00, according to the same testimony, Violeta Alpaga and the child knocked on the door of the room again, again with no answer and had unsuccessfully tried to use the internal telephone. Eventually, they found a second key and were able to enter the room and saw the woman in the room on the floor, with her body extended and her head wrapped in blood-soaked sheets. The police were called and the first officers to arrive at the home were the local Carabinieri. The Carabinieri were followed by the Mobile Radio Operations Unit sometime between 12 and 12:30. The case was transferred to the Public Prosecutor, Cesare Martellino, and his deputy, Federico De Siervo. Alberica Filo della Torre was buried in the family chapel in the monumental Verano cemetery.

== The investigations ==
The inquiry determined that the female victim was struck with some type of blunt object, likely a clog, and subsequently strangled. Her jewelry was also reported missing from the room, which became more significant later, with the receipt of intercepted telephones in July 2011. At first, investigators considered that the murder was a crime of passion, but that theory unfolded through investigative effort.

=== Internal track ===
According to the Carabinieri (police ), it was imperative to identify the murderer immediately: someone known and trusted by the victim, someone who could freely enter the villa and move about almost undisturbed, notwithstanding the throngs of visitors that morning.

Since the victim's husband was already in the office at the time of the crime, the first suspicion centered on Roberto Jacono, the son of the private tutor for the Mattei children, a young man with some mental health issues who came under suspicion because of some blood on his trousers. He would be cleared eventually by DNA.

When Jacono was eliminated, suspicion passed over to Manuel Winston Reyes, a Filipino waiter who had been fired shortly before the murder, but he too was ruled out by inconclusive DNA. In the fall of 1991, because of the apparent dead end, the prosecutor decided to suspend the investigation.

=== SISDE black funds trail ===
In October 1993, the investigations into the discovery of a number of slush funds - the so-called SISDE scandal - brought the Olgiata crime to the forefront. A number of members of the secret service were being investigated for raising private funds, essentially using SISDE's secret funds, including Michele Finocchi, who was a friend of the Mattei-Filo della Torre family. The prosecutor's investigation revealed that the family did not know of his membership in the state apparatus. It became clear that the Mattei family were completely innocent in the events.

The trail brought the public prosecutor to discover some Swiss bank accounts in the name of Alberica, for instance. The builder Pietro Mattei became a subject of investigation for alleged links which proved to be totally non-existent and were the subject of a complaint that highlighted the exorbitant investigative costs, incurred by the investigators of the Rome public prosecutor's office; the trail ultimately ended in failure. Then, on 7 January 1994, the ROS Carabinieri arrested the prefect Gerardo De Pasquale, head of the logistics department of the SISDE at that time, triggering a legal trial that in 2000 would conclude at the Supreme Court with confirmation of the convictions of six high officials of the internal secret service.

In 1996, a candidate, Italo Ormanni [it], took over as deputy prosecutor for the case. The investigators, with international financial letters rogatory, sought to uncover the complex perceived layout of financial accounts held in the name of the countess which led to the discovery of large transfers of money from Switzerland to Luxembourg, but the investigations also stood still in this area. The investigators had found, in fact, that there was no anomaly in the accounts of the countess and her husband, as the PM Cesare Martellino has publicly declared in interviews to la Repubblica and Rai 1.

=== Reopening of the case ===
In 2007, the issue was revived at the instigation of the victim's widower, Pietro Mattei, who was asking for a new analysis of DNA evidence. The first analysis did not yield any results, but Mattei insisted there could still be additional investigation. In 2008, a new analysis was ordered, leading to a finding by the RIS for DNA traces matching Manuel Winston Reyes on the victim's wristwatch and sheets. Prosecutor Francesca Loy, during her investigation, found one particular mistake in their efforts - they had not reviewed a vital recording of Reyes's phone call, in which he mentioned selling the stolen jewels, as it had sat in the files for 20 years! This lapse in time meant the murderer was not apprehended as soon as he should have been, considering this evidence sat in the offices of the prosecutor.

On 29 March 2011, DNA evidence found at the scene confirmed (in a way that investigator considered definitive) the presence of biological traces of Manuel Winston Reyes, the Filipino waiter who had been fired just weeks before the crime and who had been the sole focus of the initial investigation. Traces of his DNA were found on the cloth wrapping the victim's bleeding head. The suspect, who had been arrested immediately after the results of the tests based on flight risk, confessed to committing the crime on 1 April. In the Arrest Warrant, it noted that Reyes (who had only worked for the Matteis for two months) had given his daughter born in 1995 the name Alberica. In the prosecution that followed, Manuel Winston Reyes was sentenced to 16 years of incarceration, a sentence also confirmed in the second instance.

The former butler, benefitting from some sentence reductions, was released from prison on 10 October 2021, 10 years into his sentence, causing strong protests from some residents in Piazzale Clodio.

== Controversies ==
The countess's spouse and offspring have initiated many legal proceedings in favor of their relative's memory, which was caused by many articles in the Monocolo press. This has turned into many sentences of guilt for defamation.

- In 2009, Bruno Vespa was sentenced to a fine of one thousand euros for defamation against Pietro Mattei, a matter that was sanctioned by the Court of Cassation definitively: the conviction was determined to be derived from some episode of the television program Porta a Porta, dating back to 2002, in which Vespa had connected Mattei with the murder due to alleged supplementary funds of the SISDE.
- In 2013, the family of Alberica Filo della Torre submitted a complaint to the High Council of the Judiciary, regarding the prior deputy prosecutor Italo Ormanni, and the public prosecutor Cesare Martellino. Pietro Mattei and his sons stated they were "shocked with the superficiality with which the investigation was carried out for 20 years, full of every kind of mistake", and they stated they had applied for as the investigation to be re-opened in 2006 and were never reconciled "with the hasty requests for archiving made by PM Italo Ormanni in 2006 and the PM Ormanni in 2008."
- On April 21, 2014, the Civil Court of Rome found the three appointed technical assistants, Pascali Vicenzo Lorenzo, Arbarello Paolo and Vecchiotti Carla, negligent in the performance of their examination of the evidence on the countess's death. The court awarded damages of over €150,000, which at the request of the next of kin of the countess was awarded to the Alberica Filo della Torre Foundation to be used for charitable purposes.
- On December 11, 2015, the Rome Courthouse ruled that Bruno Vespa and Ester Vanni were ordered to compensate damages of €45,000 to the relatives of Countess Alberica Filo della Torre, for having showed graphic images of the countess's body on the program "Porta a Porta" in late 2011. The court ruled that broadcasting images of the countess's body was unjustifiable and did not serve a public interest or strike a fair balance between the right to information and respect for privacy. The images were determined to be excessively graphic and disproportionate.
- On 24 January 2020, Pietro Mattei, the Countess's husband, died aged 54 about 2 weeks after he was notified of an investigation by the Perugia prosecutor's office, and after he received an allegation of defamation from one of the PMs who had investigated the matter inaccurately, due to complaints from the family of the victim made to the Superior Council of the Judiciary.
- In October 2021, Manuel Winston Reyes was released from prison after serving less than 10 years of a prison sentence, which resulted in protests at Piazzale Clodio, the seat of the Rome prosecutor's office.

== Legacy ==
The Alberica Filo della Torre Foundation was founded on 30 January 2012 at the initiative of relatives Pietro Mattei, Domitilla Mattei and Manfredi Mattei to remember the struggle for the truth and justice. The Foundation offers legal protection and educational support to people in need of assistance. In 2012, an agreement was signed with Sapienza University to award a scholarship for a thesis abroad; it was also in 2017 that we signed a framework agreement with Roma Tre University to support and to further the specialization program in Forensic Investigations.

On 25 November 2022, Alberica Filo della Torre Foundation Award was promoted for research in the field of forensic and judicial investigations.

== See also ==
- Cold case

== Bibliography ==
- Il delitto dell'Olgiata: il giallo della porta chiusa. LA CASE. 2011. ISBN 9788890589645.
- Jelardi, Andrea (2014). Bianco, Rosso e...Giallo - Piccoli e grandi delitti e misteri italiani in venticinque anni di cronaca nera (1988-2013). Napoli: Kairòs. ISBN 978-88-98029-87-7.
