= Franco Sassi =

Italian painter

Franco Sassi (26 February 1912 – 11 November 1993) was an Italian painter, printmaker and engraver.

== Biography ==
He started his career as a graphic designer at the time when lithographic engraving was still made on the Alois Senefelder stone. As a teenager he received his initial training at the Borsalino lithographic workshop in Alessandria, the town where he lived.

In the 1930s he became friend with the engraver Cino Bozzetti, of whom he was a follower in Chalcographic Art. He took part in World War II in Slovenia; several portraits and caricatures of superiors and fellow soldiers witness this experience. He loved his native land, which he represented in the bright views of the river landscape, as well as in the sketches and drawings of Mulberry trees, clouds and clods. In the last decades of his production the vision of his land developed into the fantastic naturalism of the so-called "monsters" and the chromatic explosion of the watercolours. His production ranges from charcoal and sanguine portraits, caricatures, white and black drawings to oil paintings, watercolours, etchings and lithographic prints.

His works were shown in several collective and personal exhibitions with great public and critical participation. Some of his works are kept at the Pinacoteca Civica of Alessandria and the Civica Raccolta Achille Bertarelli in Milan. Since 2009 the Department of prints and drawings of the British Museum in London has acquired five etchings that may be dated between 1970 and 1980.

In 2025 the city of Alessandria dedicated an urban park to the artist.
