= VeniceArrhythmias =

Biannual workshop on cardiac arrhythmias in Venice, Italy

Venice Arrhythmias is a biannual international workshop on cardiac arrhythmias, which takes place in Venice, Italy. It was founded in 1989, under the presidency of Dr. Eligio Piccolo, while Dr. Antonio Raviele – current Venice Arrhythmias' President, along with Dr. Andrea Natale – succeeded him on the occasion of the fourth edition, in 1995.

The thirteenth edition will take place at the Giorgio Cini Foundation, on the island of San Giorgio Maggiore, on October 27–29, 2013. Venice Arrhythmias is endorsed by the most important international Scientific Societies operating in the cardiac electrophysiology and arrhythmology fields, such as EHRA-ESC (European Heart Rhythm Association of the European Society of Cardiology) and HRS (Heart Rhythm Society), and is also patronized by the Municipality and Province of Venice.

The 2011 edition of Venice Arrhythmias gathered 3,000 attendees and 400 invited speakers.

== Mission ==
Venice Arrhythmias provides information and reports on developments in cardiology and arrhythmology for both the scientific community and the general public. It also contributes to raising awareness of cardiac diseases and their management.

The sharing of research, experience, and skills is a core component of Venice Arrhythmias. The congress facilitates collaboration and exchange among experts and contributes to the development of international networks in the field. It also maintains links with international organizations, including the Arrhythmia Alliance (AA), Atrial Fibrillation Association (AFA), ALFA (Alliance to Fight Atrial Fibrillation), AIAC (Associazione Italiana di Aritmologia e Cardiostimolazione), APHRS (Asia Pacific Heart Rhythm Society), ECAS (European Cardiac Arrhythmias Society), ISHNE (International Society for Holter and Noninvasive Electrocardiology), SOLAECE (Sociedad Latinoamericana de Estimulación Cardíaca y Electrofisiología), STARS (Syncope Trust and Reflex Anoxic Seizures), StopAfib, and the World Society of Arrhythmias (WSA).

== Structure ==
The workshop's structure is essentially based on different kinds of scientific sessions, including symposia, debates, lectures, live cases presentations, satellite events, interactive and e-learning sessions, oral and poster communications and an allied professionals program, too. All these sessions deal with the most important topics concerning the cardiology and arrhythmology fields - such as atrial fibrillation, palpitations, anti-thrombotic therapy for cardiac arrhythmias, heart failure and cardiac resynchronization therapy, remote monitoring of cardiac arrhythmias/devices, sudden death, new technologies and techniques in catheter ablation, sport and arrhythmias, cardiac arrhythmias surgery and also arrhythmias clinical trial updates.

The “Geographical Area Corners” sessions include cardiologists from multiple countries and feature research from regions such as Brazil, Turkey, Japan, India, China, and Mexico.

Since 2011, further contribution to the event's Scientific Program has also come from Fight AF (Stop FA in Italian), the educational and awareness campaign about atrial fibrillation and its risks: results from the campaign are presented during every single edition's scientific sessions.

Venice Arrhythmias's Scientific Program is built thanks to the work of the Program Committee, chaired by Drs. Raviele and Natale, and including many international cardiology's protagonists.

== Side projects ==
Venice Arrhythmias' commitment in expanding attention and awareness towards cardiology to other audiences beyond that of its professionals led to the organization of an international short-films contest, HAB – HeArtBeats Venice Short-films Festival – whose first edition, in 2011, was actively participated by several young film-makers from all over the world. HAB 2011's Jury included renowned cardiologists and representatives from the culture and cinema world, and was chaired by one of the protagonists of nowadays' cinema, the Academy Award-winner director Francis Ford Coppola.
