= 1989 Torneo di Viareggio =

1989 Torneo Mondiale di Calcio Coppa Carnevale
41° Torneo di Viareggio

Tournament details
- Host country: Italy
- City: Viareggio
- Teams: 16

Final positions
- Champions: (Italy) Torino
- Runners-up: (Italy) Roma
- Third place: (Italy) Inter Milan
- Fourth place: (Italy) Parma

Tournament statistics
- Matches played: 30
- Goals scored: 57 (1.9 per match)

The 1989 winners of the Torneo di Viareggio (in English, the Viareggio Tournament, officially the Viareggio Cup World Football Tournament Coppa Carnevale), the annual youth football tournament held in Viareggio, Tuscany, are listed below.

== Format ==
The 16 teams are seeded in 4 groups. Each team from a group meets the others in a single tie. The winner of each group progress to the final knockout stage.

== Participating teams ==
Italian teams

- (Italy) Fiorentina
- (Italy) Inter Milan
- (Italy) Lazio
- (Italy) Milan
- (Italy) Napoli
- (Italy) Parma
- (Italy) Roma
- (Italy) Torino

European teams

- (Scotland) Aberdeen
- (Bulgaria) CSKA Sofia
- (Czechoslovakia) Dukla Prague
- (Portugal) Porto
- (West Germany) VfB Stuttgart

Asian teams

- (Japan) Tokyo

American teams

- (Argentina) Sportivo Italiano
- (Mexico) Pumas UNAM

== Group stage ==
=== Group A ===
Team	Pts	Pld	W	D	L	GF	GA	GD
(Italy) Torino	5	3	2	1	0	4	1	+3
(Italy) Parma	4	3	2	0	1	2	1	+1
(Portugal) Porto	3	3	0	2	1	1	2	-1
(Mexico) Pumas UNAM	1	3	0	1	2	0	3	-3

=== Group B ===
Team	Pts	Pld	W	D	L	GF	GA	GD
(Italy) Napoli	5	3	2	1	0	4	1	+3
(Argentina) Sportivo Italiano	4	3	1	2	0	4	0	+4
(Italy) Milan	2	3	0	2	1	2	3	-1
(Bulgaria) CSKA Sofia	1	3	0	1	2	3	9	-6

=== Group C ===
Team	Pts	Pld	W	D	L	GF	GA	GD
(Italy) Inter Milan	5	3	2	1	0	5	1	+4
(Italy) Roma	4	3	1	2	0	4	2	+2
(Czechoslovakia) Dukla Prague	3	3	1	1	1	6	4	+2
(Scotland) Aberdeen FC	0	3	0	0	3	0	8	-8

=== Group D ===
Team	Pts	Pld	W	D	L	GF	GA	GD
(Italy) Lazio	4	3	2	0	1	5	2	+3
(Germany) VfB Stuttgart	4	3	2	0	1	6	3	+3
(Italy) Fiorentina	4	3	2	0	1	4	2	+2
(Japan) Tokyo	0	3	0	0	3	0	8	-8

== Knockout stage ==
Quarter-finals
(Italy) Torino(pen)	0
(Argentina) Sportivo Italiano	0
(Italy) Napoli	0
(Italy) Parma(pen)	0
(Italy) Inter Milan	1
(Italy) Lazio	0
(Italy) Roma(pen)	0
(Germany) VfB Stuttgart	0

Semi-finals
(Italy) Torino	1
(Italy) Parma	0
(Italy) Inter Milan	1
(Italy) Roma	2

Final
(Italy) Torino	1
(Italy) Roma	0
Third place
(Italy) Inter Milan	1
(Italy) Parma	0

== Champions ==
Torneo di Viareggio 1989 Champions

Torino
4th time
