= Novi Ligure murder =

2001 double murder in Italy

The Novi Ligure murder was a double murder that took place on the evening of 21 February 2001 in Novi Ligure, Piedmont, Italy.

== Incident ==
Susanna Cassini, a 41-year-old accountant, and her 11-year-old son Gianluca were both stabbed (in total 97 times) in their home while the husband and father, Francesco De Nardo, a 45-year-old manager at the Pernigotti chocolate factory, was playing football with some friends. Had he been home at the time, Francesco would also have died, as the teenage killers had planned to murder him as well.

The daughter of the family, 16-year-old Erika De Nardo, originally claimed that the murder was committed by foreign workers in an attempted robbery. Because of her claims, a young Albanian man was detained for a short time. However, the accounts of the incident given by Erika and her 17-year-old boyfriend, Mauro "Omar" Favaro, were full of contradictions. The investigators found that no door or window in the house showed signs of having been forced open and that no valuables had been taken from the house. Neighbours also reported that the De Nardo family's two guard dogs had not barked that evening and that no unusual noise and/or movement had been heard outside the house. In addition, the weapons belonged to the family, as two knives were part of the kitchen set; it therefore seemed unlikely that a robbery could be the motive for such ferocity: this made Erika's version of events lose consistency.

The suspicions therefore fell on the young De Nardo and soon on Omar, who became a suspect following the testimony given by a passer-by who, on the evening of the crime, had seen him walking with bloodied trousers. In the evening hours of 22 February, De Nardo and Omar were summoned, officially as persons informed about the facts, and left alone for some time in an antichamber, where hidden bugs and cameras were installed. Their conversation made their guilt clear.

Both were subsequently tried for the murders and convicted. They were sentenced to 16 and 14 years in prison.

== Initial response ==
In response to the claim of the daughter that immigrants had murdered her brother and mother, newspapers demanded a crackdown on illegal immigrants, and the Northern League (Lega Nord) held anti-immigrant demonstrations.

Following early media reports on the murders, members of the public created a website in support of the daughter. The website was later shut down by the Italian justice ministry.

== Aftermath ==
Italian politicians reflected uncomfortably on the anti-immigrant frenzy the case had generated. Piero Fassino, then Minister of Justice, declared: "I believe that someone should beg the pardon of immigrants. The degree of incivility we have seen in this country in the last 48 hours should make us all reflect."

Francesco De Nardo still resides in the house where his wife and son were killed and made weekly phone calls to his daughter in prison. Susanna Cassini's mother stated that she has forgiven her granddaughter and hopes to see her again and help her as much as possible.

The daughter was released from prison in December 2011. Her accomplice was released in October 2010.

== See also ==
- Maria Laura Mainetti
