= Bastianich =

Bastianich is a Croatian-italianised surname that may refer to the following people:

- Joe Bastianich (born 1968), American restaurateur, winemaker, author, and television personality
- Lidia Bastianich (born 1947), American celebrity chef and television host, mother of Joe and Tanya
- Tanya Bastianich Manuali (born 1972), American restaurateur, daughter of Lidia, sister of Joe
