= Don Mills =

- Neighbourhood
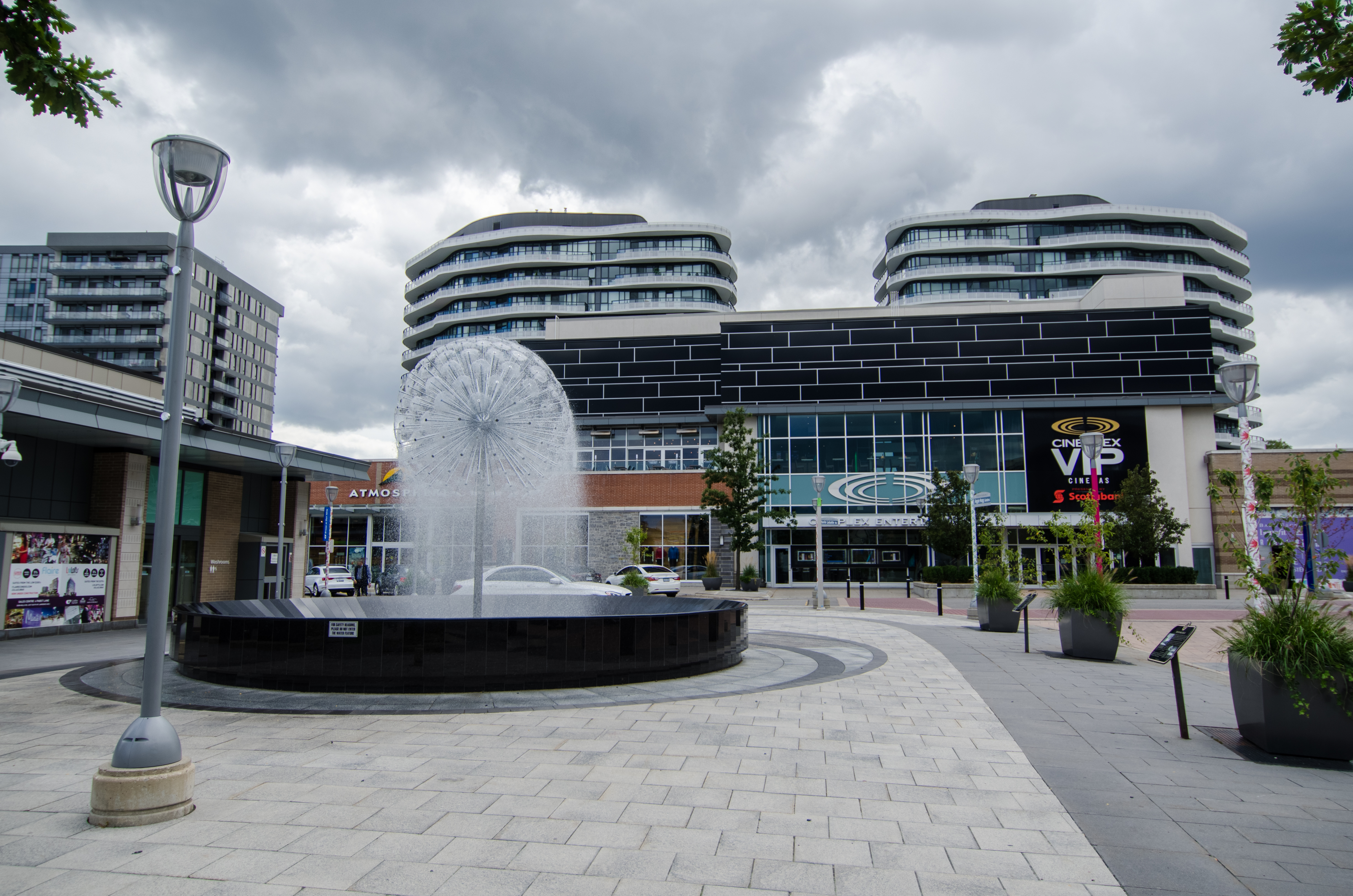
- View from Shops at Don Mills

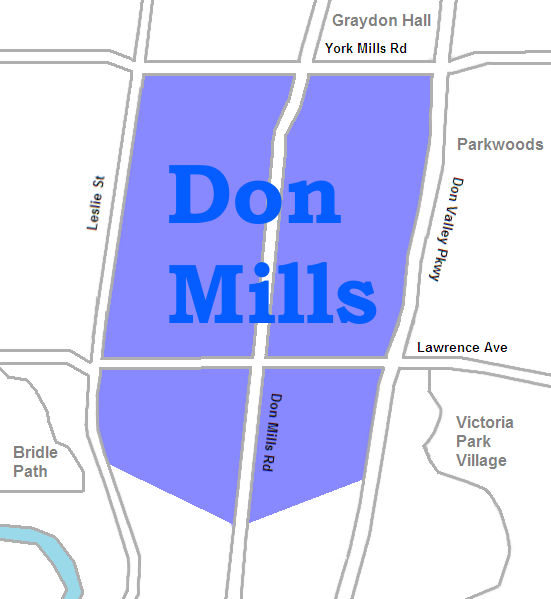
- Coordinates: 43°44′14″N 79°20′36″W
- Country: Canada
- Province: Ontario
- City: Toronto
- Municipality established: 1850 York Township
- Changed municipality: 1922 North York from York Township
- Changed municipality: 1998 Toronto from North York

Government
  - MP: Michael Coteau (Don Valley East)
  - MPP: Adil Shamji (Don Valley East)
  - Councillor: Jon Burnside (Ward 16 Don Valley East)

Population (2006)
  - Total: 25,435
- Time zone: UTC−05:00 (EST)
  - Summer (DST): UTC−04:00 (EDT)
- Postal code: M3B, M3C
- Area codes: 416, 647

Don Mills is a mixed-use neighbourhood in Toronto, Ontario, Canada. It was developed in the 1950s and 1960s to be a self-supporting "new town" and was at the time located outside Toronto proper in the suburb of North York. Consisting of residential, commercial and industrial sub-districts, it was planned and developed by private enterprise.

In several ways it became the blueprint for postwar suburban development in Toronto and contemporary residential neighbourhoods. It is bounded by York Mills Road to the north, Canadian Pacific Railway to the south, Leslie Street to the west, and Don Valley Parkway to the east. It is part of federal and provincial electoral district Don Valley East, and Toronto electoral ward 16: Don Valley East.

== History ==
The Don Mills area was first settled by Europeans in 1817. The area was a considerable distance from the town of York, but the Don River provided an easy means of transportation, and also a source of power for a number of mills along its length.

While the city of Toronto steadily expanded, the Don Mills area remained rural until after the Second World War. It was cut off from the city by ravines to the south, east, and west. Only two roads connected to the area: York Mills Road and Don Mills Road. In 1950 the area consisted of about 20 farms.

=== Development ===
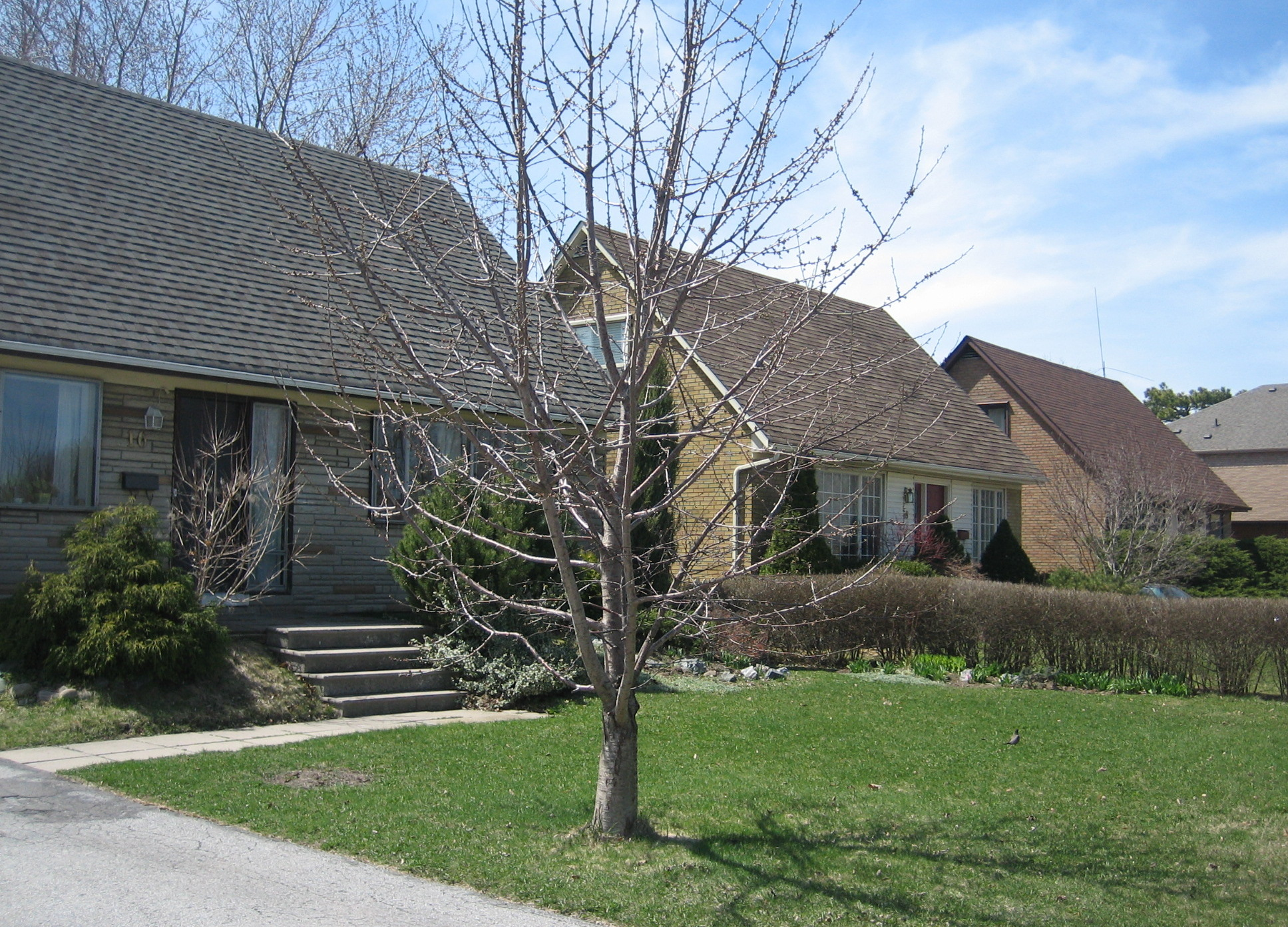
The homes in Don Mills from the early 1950s and 1960s combined principles of the Garden city movement, and the modernist Bauhaus-style of architecture.

Don Mills was designed as a model community between 1952 and 1965. Land use, architectural design and building materials were carefully regulated. Many aspects of its design have been imitated in suburban developments across Canada. Its planners would give people priority over industry and cars.

This combination of emptiness and proximity to the city attracted the attention of industrialist E.P. Taylor. His original plan was to erect a brewery on the site, along with a small community to house the workers. Taylor had limited previous experience in the property development business, but had built a project named the Wrentham Estates in York Mills. Seeing the profit to be made with such projects, Taylor abandoned the brewery idea and decided to simply build a new town on the 2,000 acres (8.1 km^{2}) he had acquired.

In 1951, he began planning the Yorktown community (as it was first known), and it was announced on March 11, 1953. The community was to be built on about 8.35 km^{2} (3.22 sq mi) of farmland centred at the intersection of Don Mills Road and Lawrence Avenue East, with an expected cost of $200 million. Development was headed by the Taylor-owned Don Mills Development Company, (known as O'Keefe Realty in the days of the brewery development).

==== Design principles ====
The design of Don Mills was influenced by Ebenezer Howard's Garden City, and by the principles of two American town planners, Clarence Stein and Henry Wright, who developed the garden city community of Radburn, New Jersey. Design of the project was entrusted to Macklin Hancock, the son-in-law of Taylor's executive assistant. Still in his mid-20s, Hancock was a graduate student at Harvard when approached for the job. At Harvard Hancock had studied under a number of the founders of modernism and new town planning including Walter Gropius, William Holford, and Hideo Sasaki.

These studies led Hancock to envision a self-contained community distinguished by consistent design principles and a modernist style. Several names were proposed for the new development, including Eptown after Taylor. It was called Yorktown at its initial unveiling, but the name Don Mills was finally adopted at the suggestion of Hancock.

The design was based on five planning principles, which had not been implemented in Canada before:

1. The neighbourhood principle – which broke down the community into four neighbourhood quadrants, all surrounding a regional shopping centre, Don Mills Centre, at the southwest corner of Don Mills and Lawrence. Each quadrant was to contain a school, a church, and a park.
2. Separation of pedestrian and vehicle traffic – which was accomplished through the creation of a network of pedestrian paths providing easy access through parks to area schools and the town centre, while roads were designed to slow vehicular traffic through the use of winding roads, T-intersections, and cul-de-sacs.
3. Promotion of modernist architecture and the modern aesthetic – Don Mills Development controlled the architectural design, colours, and materials of all buildings in Don Mills. As well, the corporation insisted that builders use company-approved architects who had been educated according to Bauhaus principles, to prevent the project from deteriorating into a typical post-war subdivision of builder's homes.
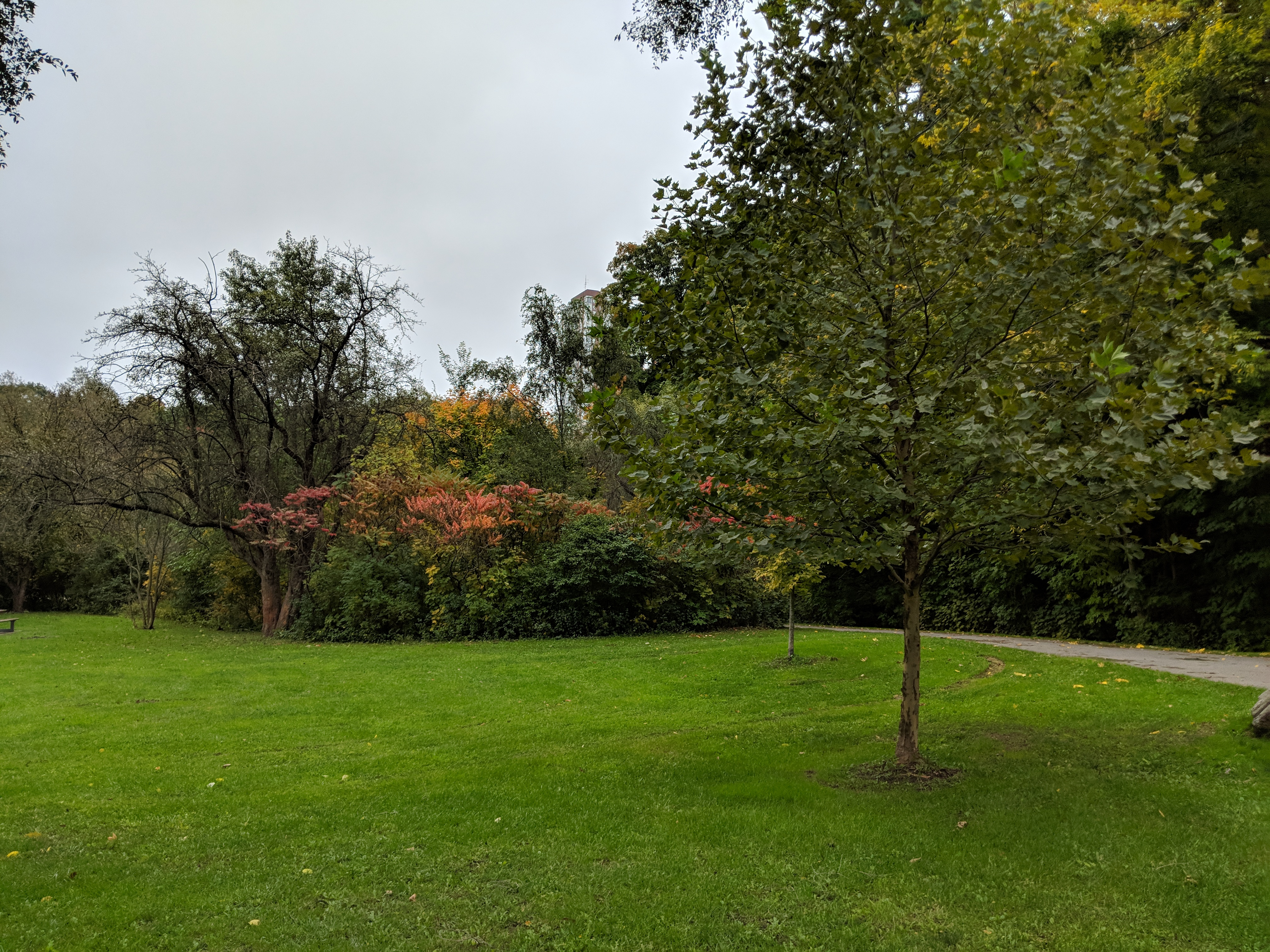
  Moccasin Trail Park, a park linked to other green spaces as well as the rest of the Toronto ravine system.
4. Creation of a greenbelt – linked to a system of neighbourhood parks that would preserve the beauty of the surrounding ravines.
5. Integration of industry into the community – which followed Howard's ideals for the Garden City. Planners felt that it was important for residents to live and work in the same satellite town so that Don Mills would not become a bedroom community. A sizable number of high residential densities—rental townhouses and low-rise apartments—was essential if the town were to attract a cross-section of residents working in local industries.

Home situation design was also influential to subsequent subdivisions in Canada. The homes were located on square lots with long street frontages. Houses were previously situated on rectangular lots, narrow end to the street. The square lots meant that houses faced the street with their long side, but had less deep backyards.

The developers also affected two highway projects being developed concurrently. The 'Toronto Bypass', now known as Ontario Highway 401 does not have an interchange at Don Mills Road due to the development. The Don Valley Parkway, built in part to service the community, was originally to be built on Don Mills Road, but was moved east to the Woodbine Avenue right-of-way north of Lawrence.

=== Recent history (2000–present) ===
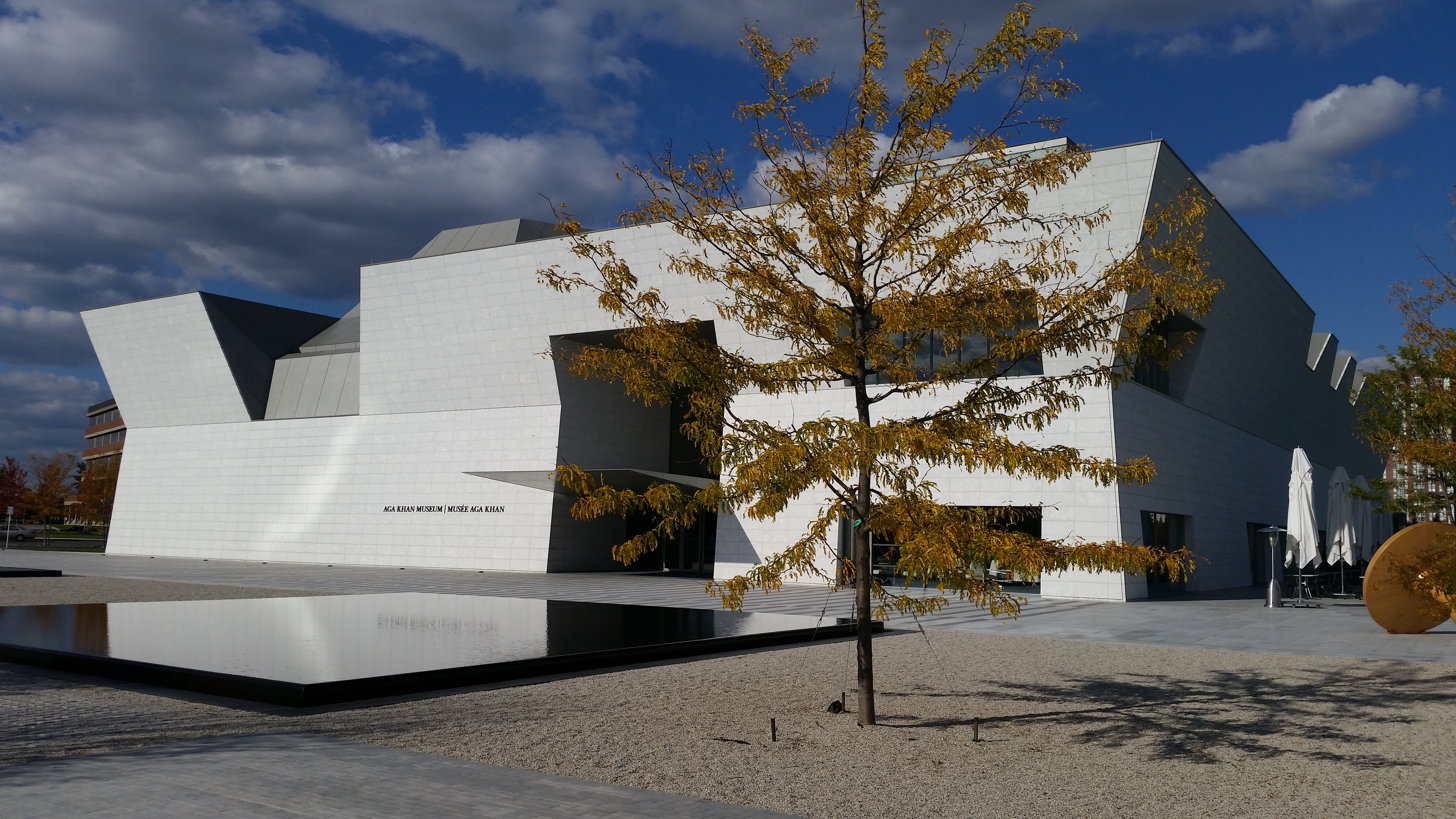
The Aga Khan Museum was opened in September 2014.

In 2006, Don Mills Centre was demolished to make way for Shops at Don Mills, a large shopping centre. The shopping centre opened in April 2009.

At Wynford Drive and the Don Valley Parkway, a new $300 million cultural project was built on 6.8 hectares (17 acres) of land. The foundation was laid on May 28, 2010, by Prime Minister Stephen Harper and His Highness the Aga Khan. It was designed by India-based architect Charles Correa, Japanese architect Fumihiko Maki, Lebanese landscape architect Vladimir Djurovic and the Toronto-based Moriyama & Teshima Architects.

The project was completed in 2014, with the opening of the Ismaili Centre, the Aga Khan Museum and a public park. The museum provides an exhibition space for Islamic art and history, and it also provides a centre for the Ismaili community in Canada.

== Demographics ==
The city places Don Mills in a community called Banbury-Don Mills. In 2006, it had a population of 25,435.

Major ethnic and cultural groups (by ancestry) in 2001:

- Chinese - 12%
- English - 11%
- Canadian - 11%
- Jewish - 7%
- Scottish - 7%
- Irish - 5%
- East Indian - 4%
- German - 3%
- French - 2%
- Polish - 2%
- Other - 36%

The percentage of population below the poverty line dropped from 13% (in 1996) to 12% (in 2001).

== Education ==
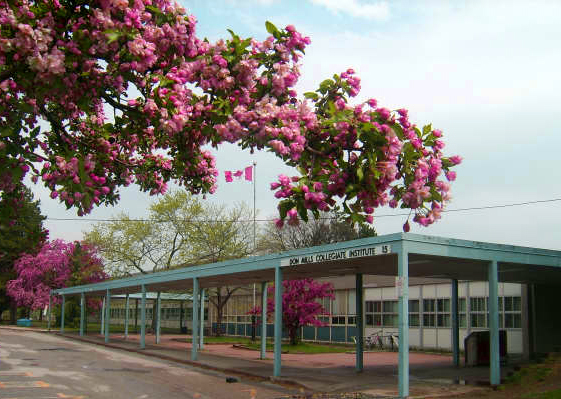
Don Mills Collegiate Institute is a public secondary school located in the neighbourhood.

The Toronto District School Board (TDSB) is a public school board that operates three elementary schools in Don Mills, Greenland Public School, Norman Ingram Public School, and Three Valleys Public School. TDSB also operates one secondary school in the neighbourhood, Don Mills Collegiate Institute.

In addition to TDSB, three other public school boards also offer schooling to residents of Don Mills, the Toronto Catholic District School Board (TCDSB), secular school board; and two French first language public school board, the secular Conseil scolaire Viamonde (CSV), and it separate counterpart, Conseil scolaire catholique MonAvenir (CSCM). However, none of the three school boards operate school in Don Mills, with CSCM, CSV, and TCDSB students attending schools situated in other neighbourhoods in Toronto.

== Recreation ==
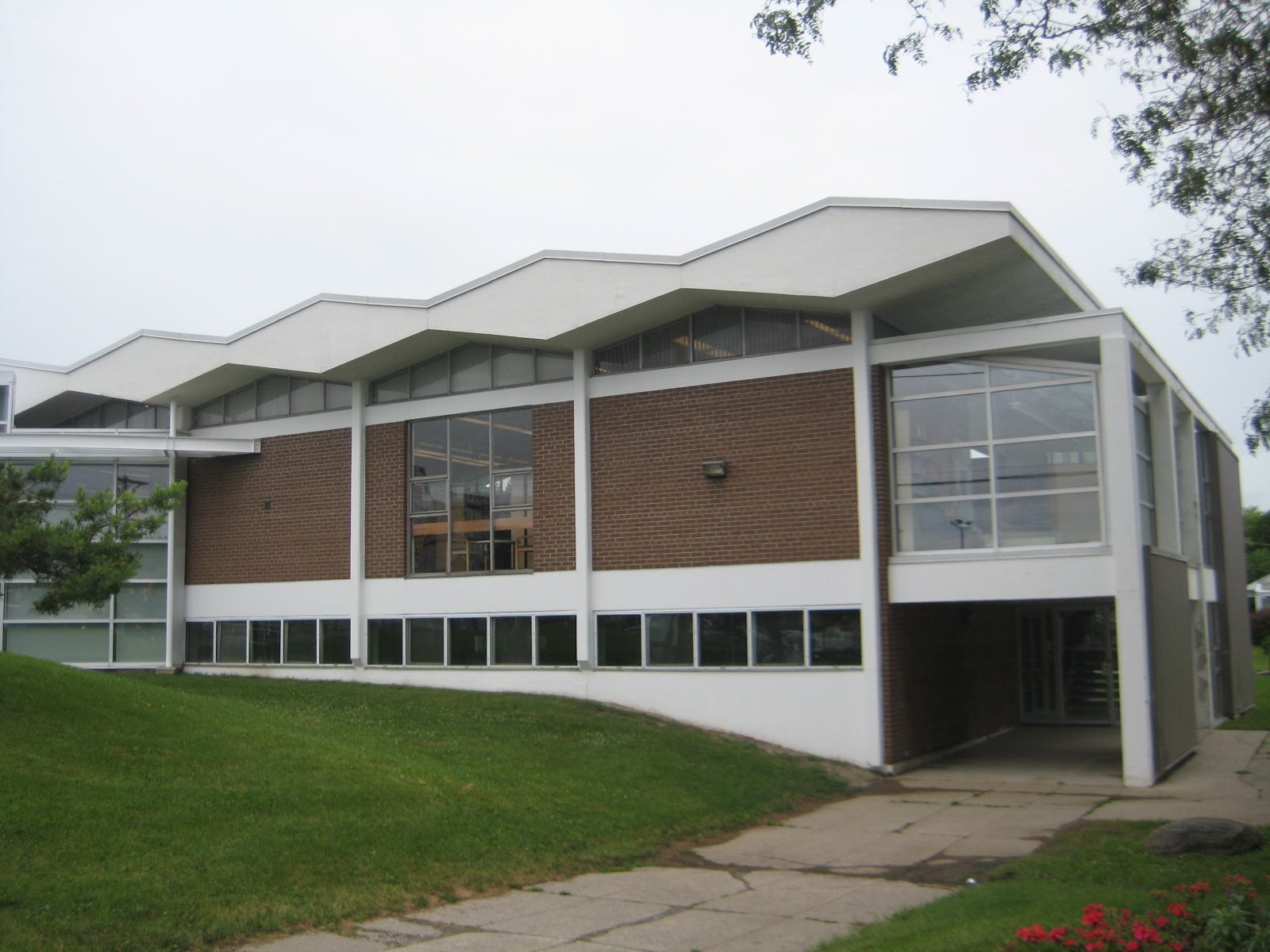
Don Mills branch of the Toronto Public Library is located in the neighbourhood.

Don Mills is home to a number of municipal parks including Bond Park, which has sports fields and an arena, Chipping Park, and Moccasin Trail Park. The latter two parks are situated near the Don Valley, which forms a part of the Toronto ravine system. Municipal parks in the neighbourhood are managed by the Toronto Parks, Forestry and Recreation Division. The neighbourhood is also home to the Don Mills branch of the Toronto Public Library.

Several retail outlets, and shopping malls are also located in Don Mills. Shops at Don Mills is a lifestyle center-styled shopping centre located at the southwest corner of Lawrence Avenue and Don Mills Road, on the site of the former Don Mills Centre.

== Transportation ==
Several major roadways are situated in Don Mills, including Lawrence Avenue, and York Mills Road, which serves as the neighbourhood's northern boundary. To the east, the neighbourhood is bounded by the Don Valley Parkway, a major municipal controlled access highway. Eglinton Avenue is a major roadway situated south of Don Mills.

Public transportation in Don Mills is provided by the Toronto Transit Commission (TTC). The TTC operates several bus routes in the neighbourhood. Line 5 Eglinton, a light rail line operated as a part of the Toronto subway system, opened in 2026. Stations for the line are located along Eglinton Avenue, with Aga Khan Park & Museum and Don Valley stations situated just south of Don Mills. The neighbourhood serves as a transition point for Line 5 Eglinton, with the line operating as a surface level route for every stop east of Don Valley station.
