= Arjav Ezekiel =

- Born: 1987 or 1988 (age 37–38); New Delhi, India
- Education: Kenyon College
- Spouse: Tracy Malechek-Ezekiel
- Culinary career
- Current restaurant: Birdie's
- Awards won: New York Times Restaurant List 2021; Bon Appetit Best New Restaurants in America; Esquire Best New Restaurants in America; Food & Wine Restaurant of the Year 2023; Esquire Wine Director of the Year 2022; James Beard Award: Outstanding Professional in Beverage Service 2025

Arjav Ezekiel is an Indian-American restaurateur and sommelier. He and his wife, chef Tracy Malechek-Ezekiel, own and operate Birdie's in Austin, Texas, which was named Food & Wine's 2023 Restaurant of the Year. He is a James Beard Award Winner for Outstanding Professional in Beverage Service and named to the 2025 Time 100 Next list of Innovators with his wife, the chef Tracy Malechek-Ezekiel.

== Early life ==
Ezekiel was born in New Delhi, India. In 1999, when he was twelve, his family emigrated to Portland, Oregon, on tourist visas and became undocumented after their visas expired. He has described the stresses of living undocumented; when he was in high school, his school choir toured Europe, and he "had to come up with a creative excuse for not going". His parents could not return home for their own parents' funerals.

Ezekiel attend Kenyon College.

== Career ==
After graduating from college, Ezekiel was offered a job as a paralegal but was unable to accept it because of his undocumented status. He started working in restaurants in Washington DC, including Komi and Wolfgang Puck's Source, starting as a waiter and eventually becoming captain, and decided to make hospitality his career. He worked in New York at Gramercy Tavern and Untitled, both restaurants owned by Union Square Hospitality Group. He staged at French Laundry and Meadowood.

In 2021, Ezekiel and his wife, chef Tracy Malechek-Ezekiel, opened Birdie's, a counter-service wine bar, in Austin, Texas where he manages the wine program. In 2023 Food & Wine named it their Restaurant of the Year. Arjav was Esquire Wine Director of the Year in 2022 and was the first ever recipient of the James Beard Award for Outstanding Professional in Beverage Service in 2025-a national award. He was also named to the 2025 Time 100 Next list that year.

== Personal life ==
In 2012, he received documentation under the Deferred Action for Childhood Arrivals program (DACA). Ezekiel married Tracy Malechek-Ezekiel in 2018; the couple met in 2015 while working in at Untitled New York City and decided to move to Austin to open a restaurant together to enable a better work-life balance. The couple have a son born in 2022.

Ezekiel received a green card after his marriage and in 2023 became a US citizen. Before becoming a citizen, he never visited a wine region outside of the United States.
