= Del Posto =

New York City restaurant

Coordinates: 40°44′36.5″N 74°0′27″W

- Interactive map of Del Posto

Restaurant information
- Established: 2005
- Closed: 2021
- Location: New York City, New York, United States

Del Posto was a Michelin-starred fine dining Italian restaurant at 85 Tenth Avenue in the Chelsea neighborhood of Manhattan owned by Mario Batali and Lidia, Tanya, and Joe Bastianich. The restaurant received a Michelin star for many years. In the spring of 2021, after sixteen years, the space was sold to three employees, and opened as Al Coro in 2022.

Mario Batali was a partner from 2005-2018.

== Reviews ==
In 2010, The New York Times gave them a four-star review.

== Notable people ==
- Tracy Malechek-Ezekiel
- Brooks Headley
