= Unieuro =

Italian consumer electronics retailer

Unieuro S.p.A.
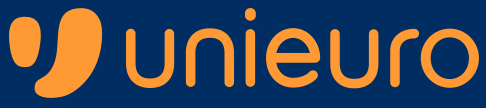

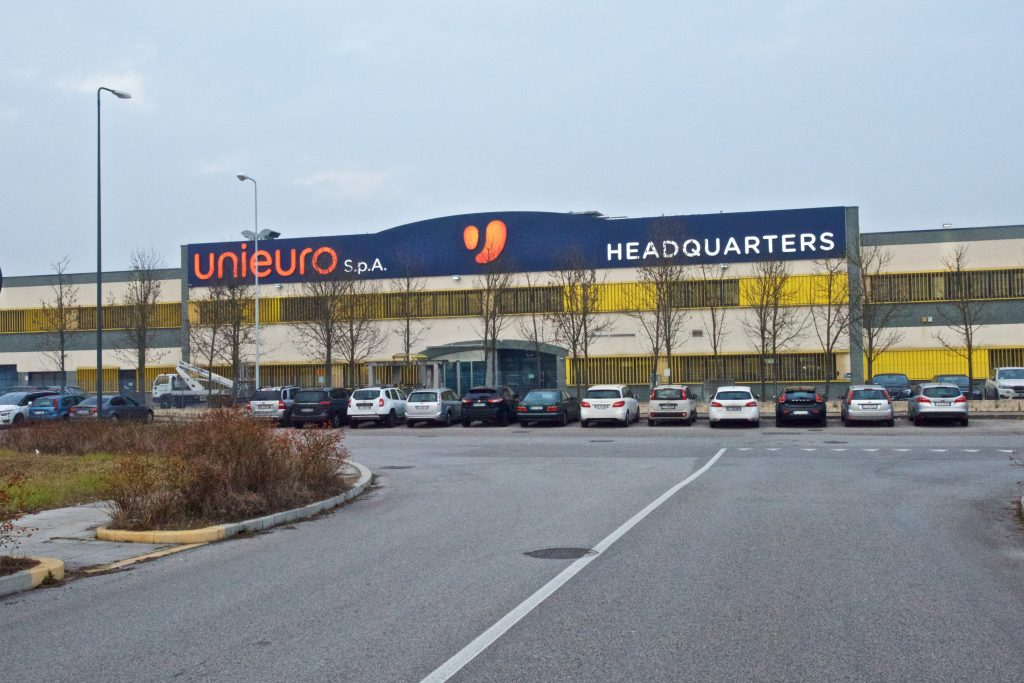
- Headquarters
- Formerly: Unieuro S.p.A. (1967-2013) Unieuro S.r.l. (2013-2016)
- Type: Public
- Traded as: BIT: UNIR
- ISIN: IT0005239881
- Industry: Retail
- Founded: 1967; 59 years ago, in Alba, Italy
- Founder: Paolo Farinetti
- Headquarters: Forlì, Italy
- Area served: Italy
- Key people: Giancarlo Nicosanti Monterastelli (CEO)
- Products: Brown goods White goods Telecommunications; Information technology Cameras; Consumer electronics
- Revenue: €1.66 Bln (FY 2017)
- Number of employees: 3,900 (FY 2017)
- Parent: Fnac Darty
- Website: www.unieurospa.com

Unieuro S.p.A. is the largest Italian retailer of consumer electronics and household appliances by number of outlets, with a network of 460 stores throughout Italy.

The company, which reported net revenues of €1.66bln for the fiscal year ended February 28, 2017, debuted on the Italian Stock Exchange, by listing on STAR Segment, on April 4, 2017 under the UNIR ticker.

== History ==
In 1967, Unieuro S.p.A. was born in Alba, in the province of Cuneo - with the opening of a warehouse in which clothing and linens were sold - whose founder Paolo Farinetti (father of Oscar Farinetti, in turn founder of Eataly), gives the warehouse this name in honor of Altiero Spinelli, thinking that Europe would soon unite and become a single large market. The introduction of household appliances initially took place via catalog in the early seventies, while the first four warehouses dedicated exclusively to housewares and household appliances date back to 1986.

In the same years, Unieuro continued to expand and, in the nineties, also landed in Liguria. The expansion then also takes place through franchising and, in 1995, the Trony brand was acquired, then sold to the G.R.E. S.p.A. purchasing group. In the second part of the nineties, numerous sales points were opened, including Rome in 1999, and Triveneta S.p.A. was acquired. The expansion continues and Unieuro becomes present in a large part of the national territory.

In 2002, the Farinetti family sold Unieuro to the British group Dixons Group Plc, which from then on would control it 100% for approximately eleven years, until 2013.

In the autumn of 2013, as part of a process of consolidation of the consumer electronics market currently underway in Italy, Dixons Retail Plc signed an agreement with SGM Distribuzione S.r.l. for the sale to the latter of the Unieuro S.p.A. chain, which will become Unieuro S.r.l.

In parallel - a brand revitalization campaign was launched which, starting from 25 June 2014, lead to the adoption of the Unieuro brand in all of the brand's sales points. The Marco Polo Expert brand was abandoned and the company left the Expert Italy S.p.A. consortium.

At the same time, the headquarters moved to Forlì, where SGM Distribuzione was already present.

In 2015, the new Unieuro continued its territorial expansion with the acquisition, by Dixons Travel S.r.l., of eight stores located in the Milan-Linate, Milan-Malpensa and Rome-Fiumicino airports.

In 2016 the merger between SGM Distribuzione S.r.l. took place. and Unieuro S.r.l., which led to the birth of the current Unieuro S.p.A.

On 4 April 2017 the company was listed on the stock exchange, and began a campaign of acquisitions of chains and stores throughout Italy.

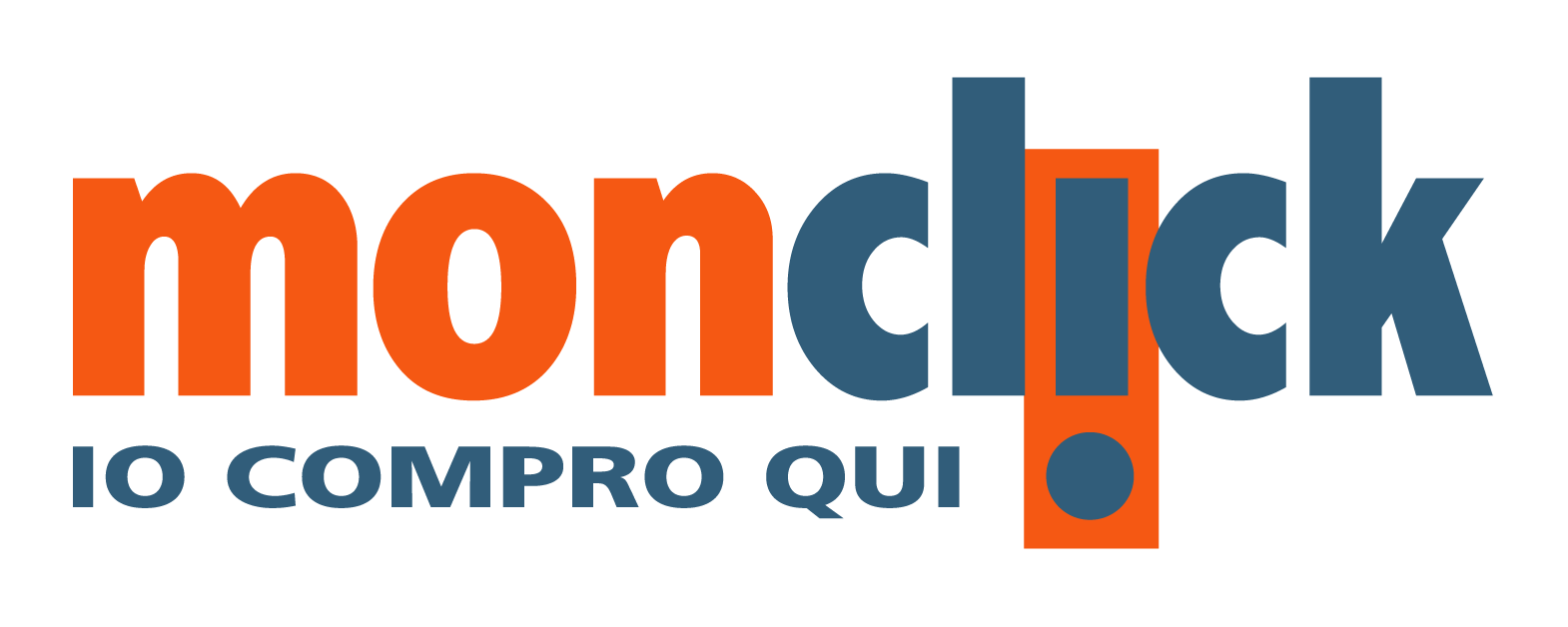
Monclick logo

In June 2017, Unieuro S.p.A. also announced and completed the acquisition of e-commerce operator Monclick S.r.l. and of further 21 direct stores from Andreoli S.p.A. in Central Italy.

In October 2017, It was reported that Unieuro entered into a contract to acquire Cerioni Group S.p.A. branch company consisting of 19 direct stores, currently operating under the brand Euronics.

On April 6, 2021 Iliad became the first shareholder of Unieuro S.p.A. following the acquisition of a company share close to 12%.

== Logos ==
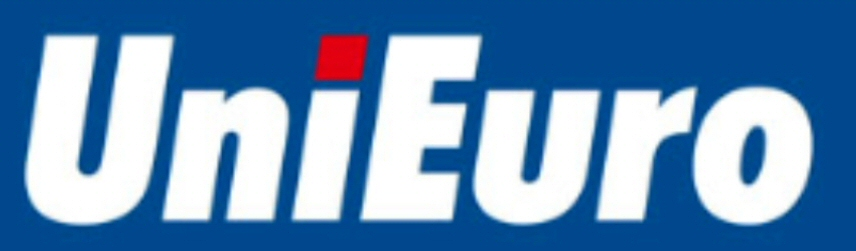
1986 - 2010

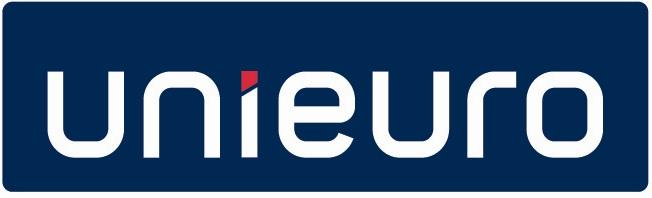
2010 - 2014

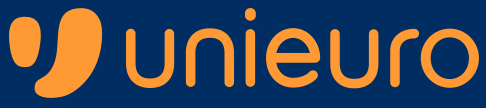
Since 2014
