= Joe Bastianich =

American restaurateur (born 1968)

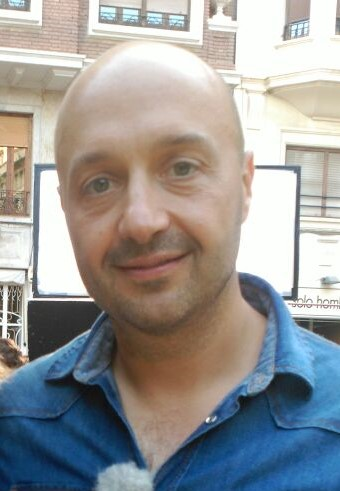
- Bastianich in 2015
- Born: Joseph Bastianich; September 17, 1968 (age 58); Queens, New York City, U.S.
- Citizenship: United States; Italy
- Education: Boston College (BA)
- Occupations: Restaurateur; author; television personality
- Spouse: Deanna Damiano
- Parents: Felice "Felix" Bastianich (father); Lidia Matticchio (mother)
- Family: Tanya Bastianich Manuali (sister)
- Culinary career
- Cooking style: Italian
- Rating
- Michelin stars
- Current restaurant
- Full list
- Television show
- Full list

Joseph Bastianich (born September 17, 1968) is an American restaurateur, author, musician, and television personality. He, along with his mother and business partner Lidia Bastianich, co-owns thirty restaurants in four countries, including Osteria Mozza in Los Angeles, which the owners expanded in 2010. Earlier that same year, they teamed up with businessman Oscar Farinetti to bring Eataly, an upscale food and wine market, to Dallas, Boston, Chicago, Las Vegas, Los Angeles, New York City, London and Stockholm.

== Early life ==
Joseph Bastianich was born on September 17, 1968, in Astoria, Queens, to Istrian Italian immigrants Felice and Lidia Bastianich. His parents were born in Istria (Yugoslavia, now Croatia) and moved to the United States in 1958 during the large Istrian exodus. While Italian by nationality, public DNA tests have shown that Joe's family on his mother's side is largely of Yugoslavian and Southeastern European descent. His mother has stated that she feels very Italian, but that she relates to her Slavic roots too. Raised working in his parents' Italian restaurant Felidia in Manhattan, he attended Fordham Preparatory School before attending Boston College, where he studied and earned a degree in finance.

== Career ==
=== Restaurateur ===
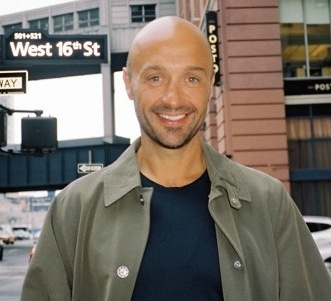
Joe Bastianich in 2011

After spending a year on Wall Street as a bond trader, he gave up his newly launched career and ventured into the food industry. He took an extended trip to Italy. In 1993, he opened Becco (Italian for "peck", "nibble", "savor"), an Italian restaurant with his mother, Lidia Bastianich. He then partnered with Mario Batali to open Babbo Ristorante e Enoteca, an Italian restaurant that gained the prestigious three stars from The New York Times, the first Italian restaurant to gain the award in 40 years. Together they opened seven more restaurants in New York: Lupa, Esca, Casa Mono, Bar Jamon, Otto, Del Posto and Eataly (an Italian marketplace). In 2010, Del Posto received a four star review from The New York Times, one of only five restaurants in New York to win that award. Their culinary empire has expanded to 10 restaurants in New York, four restaurants in Las Vegas, three restaurants in Los Angeles, two restaurants in Singapore, one Italian market in Chicago, one Italian market in Boston, one Italian market in London, and two restaurants in Hong Kong. After being accused of sexual harassment, Batali gave up his restaurants, selling his shares to Bastianich and his sister Tanya Bastianich Manuali. Otto Enoteca Pizzeria closed during the coronavirus pandemic. When it closed, TimeOut wrote "it was the type of place that was nice yet casual enough to go on any night of the week with plenty of tables the white marble-covered enoteca (offering wine, cheese and salumi) and the more formal dining area focusing on pastas and pizzas. We'll also miss the olive oil gelato."

Bastianich has co-authored two award-winning books on Italian wine, and his memoir, Restaurant Man, became a New York Times Best Seller within a week of its release in May 2012.

=== Television ===
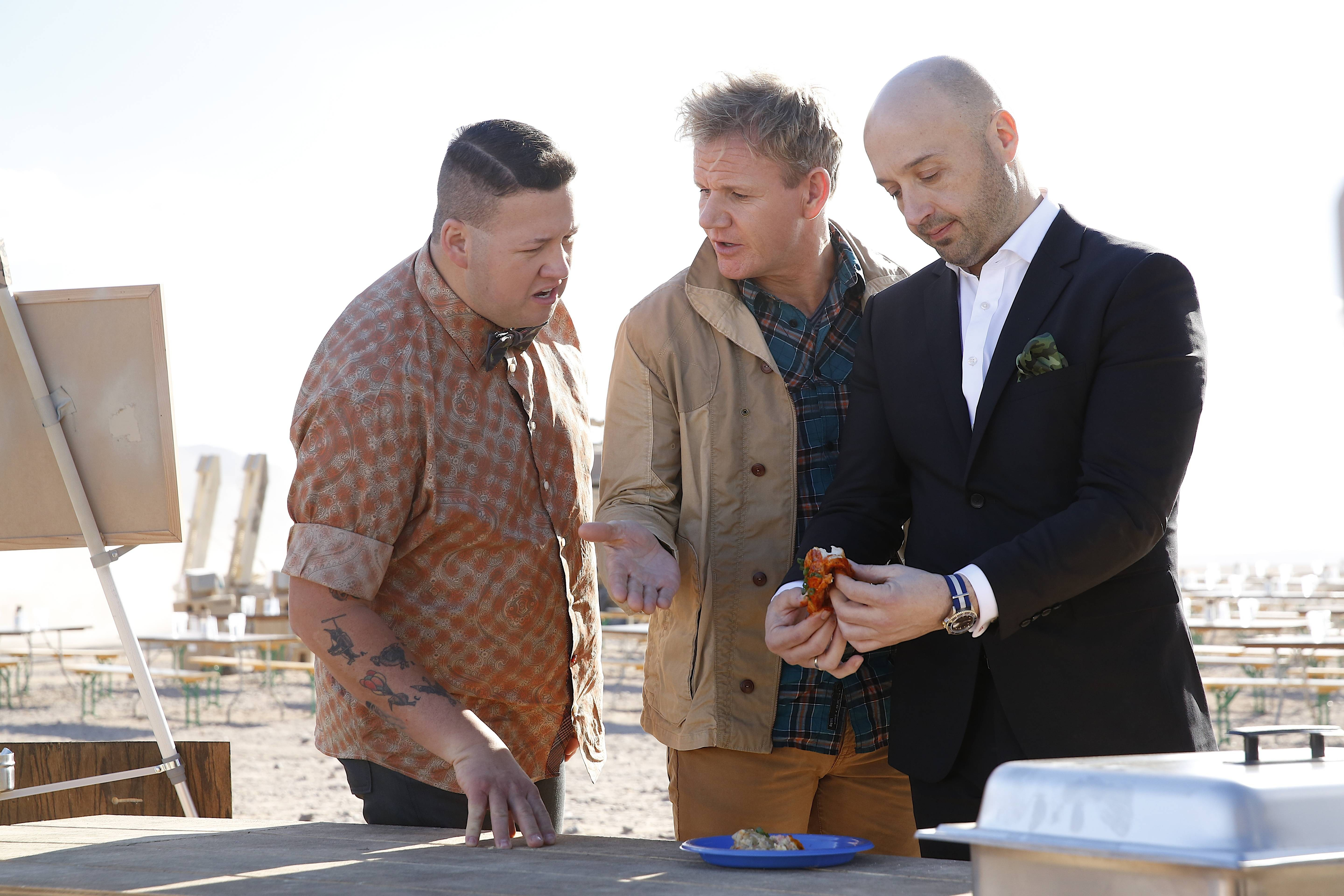
Bastianich with Graham Elliot and Gordon Ramsay at the Fort Irwin National Training Center

Bastianich was a judge on the American MasterChef series broadcast by Fox until it took too much of his time, and MasterChef Junior until he was replaced on both series by Christina Tosi in the spring of 2015 after he exited the franchise in November 2014. However, he eventually returned to temporarily judge Season 6 of MasterChef Junior on March 2, 2018 and has returned to the judging panel as a full-time judge on MasterChef since Season 9 in June 2018. He was also a judge on the Italian version of the program. MasterChef Italia shown on Sky Uno for its first 8 seasons. In May 2019, Bastianich announced his departure from MasterChef Italia in order to dedicate himself to his passion for music. In mid-September of the same year, Bastianich released his first album, titled "Aka Joe". In late January 2020, he starred in a musical concert tour around Italy, featuring his "New York Stories" album.

He has also guest starred as a guest judge on MasterChef Canada on Season 1, Episode 14. He co-starred alongside Tim Love and Antonia Lofaso in the American reality show Restaurant Startup on CNBC, for which he is the executive producer along with Endemol Shine North America.

Bastianich also made a special appearance in the 2015 television film An American Girl: Grace Stirs Up Success as a judge in a fictional season of MasterChef Junior.

From March 22, 2016, he presented, with Guido Meda and Davide Valsecchi, the first edition of Top Gear Italia. He also served as a judge on the judging panel of Italia's Got Talent and Family Food Fight Italia, airing on Sky Uno in the spring of 2020.

In a 2018 episode of MasterChef Italia, Bastianich made several jokes at the expense of Chinese men to Asian women giving him a manicure and pedicure at a beauty salon in Milan's Chinatown. When asked by the blog Grub Street for comment, Bastianich responded that "this was a scripted segment shot in a Milan nail salon that I've gone to regularly. I know the women, and we were given the questions to discuss in advance. That said, it's clear that some of what I said was in poor taste and not reflective of my views. I'm sorry I said those things."

In 2024, Bastianich competed in season 11 of The Masked Singer as "Spaghetti & Meatballs". He was eliminated on "Billy Joel Night".

== Restaurants ==
The Bastianich Hospitality Group own and co-own several restaurants mostly in New York City and Los Angeles, including Becco in NYC, Chi Spacca and Osteria Mozza in Los Angeles and Washington DC.

- BABBO Ristorante e Enoteca, New York City
- Bar Jamon, New York City
- Becco, New York City
- Birreria, New York City
- Casa Mono, New York City
- Chi Spacca, Los Angeles
- Eataly, New York City
- ESCA, New York City
- Lidia's, Kansas City, Missouri
- LUPA, New York City
- Mozza2Go, Los Angeles, California
- Orsone, Cividale del Friuli (Frazione Gagliano), Italy
- Joe's American BBQ, Milan, Italy
- Osteria Mozza, Los Angeles, California
- Pizzeria Mozza, Los Angeles, California / Newport Beach, California
- Tarry Wine, Port Chester (closed)
- Tarry Lodge, Port Chester (closed) / Westport, Connecticut
- Tarry Lodge, (closed) New Haven, Connecticut

== Legal issues ==
Starting in 2015, several employees at Batali & Bastianich alleged sexual harassment against Mario Batali. The Attorney General of New York subsequently began an investigation and found a culture of widespread sexual harassment and retaliation at the Batali & Bastianich Hospitality Group. In March 2019, Batali surrendered ownership of his stakes in Batali & Bastianich Hospitality Group, a partnership between Batali and the Bastianich family, including Joe and Lidia Bastianich. In 2019, Bastianich and Batali reached a $600,000 sexual harassment settlement to at least 20 former employees. The Bastianiches said in 2019 that B&B Hospitality Group's name will change, and by July 2019, it had changed to Pasta Resources.

== Personal life ==
As of 2016, Bastianich lives in New York City, with his wife, Deanna, and their children, Olivia, Ethan, and Miles. He speaks Italian.

== Filmography ==
=== Television ===
Year	Title	Role	Notes
2010–2014; 2018–present	MasterChef	Himself / Judge / Guest Judge	208 episodes
2011–2019	MasterChef Italia	Himself / Judge	85 episodes
2012	MasterChef Poland	Himself / Guest Judge	1 episode
2013–2018	MasterChef Junior	Himself / Judge	36 episodes
2014	MasterChef Canada	Himself / Guest Judge	3 episodes
2014	Restaurant Startup	Himself	
2020–2021	Italia's Got Talent	Himself / Judge	3 episodes
2016	Top Gear Italy	Himself	6 episodes
2023	Call My Agent - Italy!	Himself	Episode: Pierfrancesco e Anna
2023	Pechino Express	Himself	Contestant (winner)
2024	The Masked Singer	Himself/Spaghetti & Meatballs	Season 11 contestant; episode: Group C Premiere: Billy Joel Night
2024	L'isola dei famosi	Himself	Contestant
2025	Foodish	Himself / Presenter	76 episodes

== Bibliography ==
- 2015. Healthy Pasta: The Sexy, Skinny, and Smart Way to Eat Your Favorite Food. (Knopf)
- 2014. Giuseppino. Da New York all'Italia: storia del mio ritorno a casa. (Potter)
- 2013. Restaurant Man. (Knopf)
- 2010. Grandi Vini: An Opinionated Tour of Italy's 89 Finest Wines. (Potter)
- 2005. Vino Italiano: The Regional Wines of Italy. (Potter)
