= Cru (restaurant) =

Defunct restaurant in New York City

- Interactive map of Cru

Restaurant information
- Established: August 2004
- Location: 24 Fifth Avenue, New York City, New York, 10011, United States
- Coordinates: 40°43′59″N 73°59′46″W

Cru was a restaurant in Greenwich Village, New York City. It had received a Michelin star.

== Notable people ==
- Tracy Malechek-Ezekiel

== See also ==
- List of Michelin-starred restaurants in New York City
