= Lidia Bastianich =

Italian-American celebrity chef (born 1947)

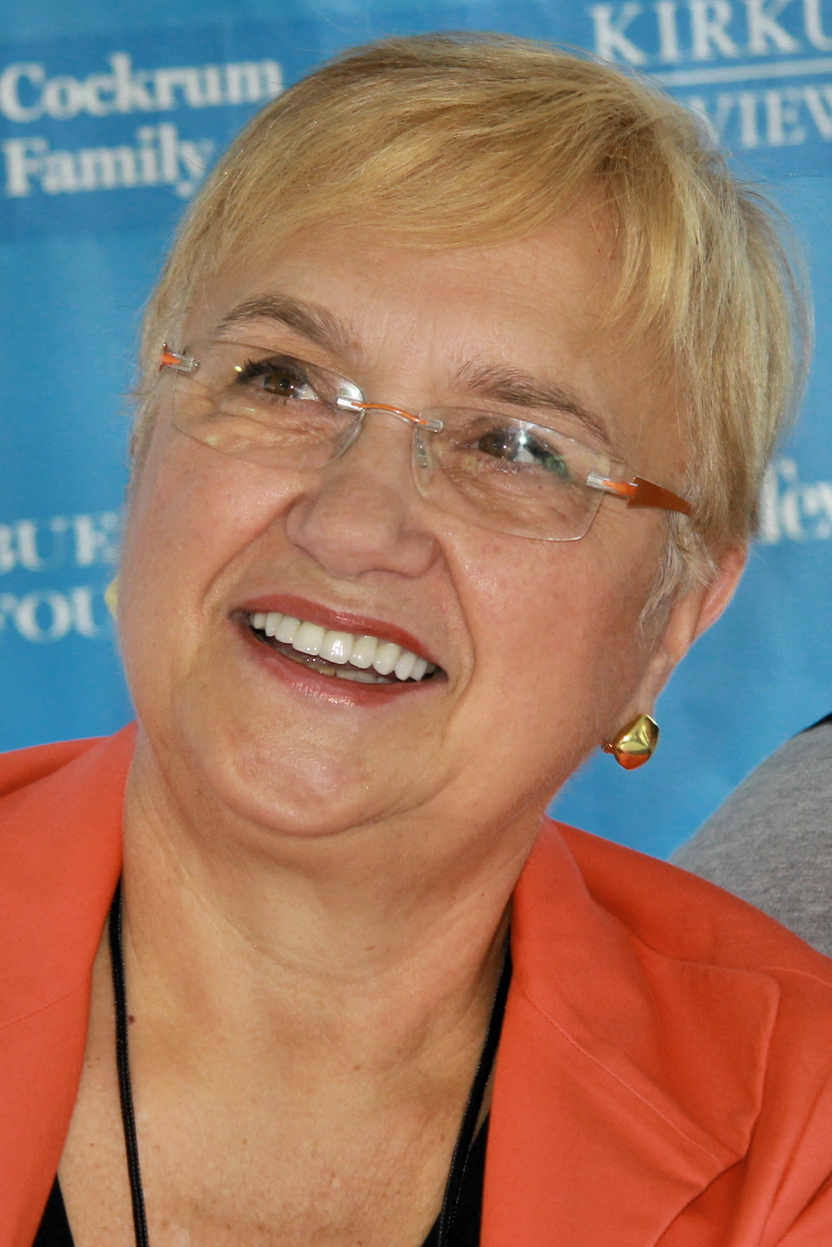
- Bastianich in 2014
- Born: Lidia Giuliana Matticchio; February 21, 1947 (age 79); Pula, Zone A Allied military administration
- Spouse: Felice "Felix" Bastianich (m. 1966; div. 1998)
- Children: Joe Bastianich; Tanya Bastianich Manuali
- Culinary career
- Cooking style: Italian; Italian-American
- Current restaurants
- Felidia, Becco, Lidia's Kansas City, Del Posto
- Television shows
- Lidia's Italy in America, Lidia Celebrates America, Lidia's Italy, Lidia's Family Table, Lidia's Italian–American Kitchen
- Website: lidiasitaly.com

Lidia Giuliana Matticchio Bastianich (Note: Italian: [ˈliːdja dʒuˈljaːna matˈtikkjo baˈstjaːnitʃ]; née Matticchio) (born February 21, 1947) is an American celebrity chef, television host, author, and restaurateur. Specializing in Italian and Italian-American cuisine, Bastianich has been a regular contributor to public television cooking shows since 1998.

Born in the allied-occupied Pula, Matticchio Bastianich's family emigrated to the United States when she was nine years old during the Istrian–Dalmatian exodus. In 2014, she launched her fifth television series, Lidia's Kitchen. She owns or has owned several Italian restaurants in the U.S. in partnership with her daughter Tanya Bastianich Manuali and her son Joe Bastianich, including Felidia (founded with her ex-husband, Felice), Del Posto (closed and sold in 2021), and Becco in Manhattan; Lidia's Pittsburgh in Pittsburgh (closed in 2019); and Lidia's Kansas City in Kansas City, Missouri. She also is a partner in Eataly locations in New York City, Chicago, Boston, Los Angeles, Las Vegas, Silicon Valley, Dallas, and São Paulo, Brazil.

== Early life ==
Lidia Giuliana Matticchio Bastianich was born on February 21, 1947, in Pula, Zone A Allied military administration, just before the city was assigned to Yugoslavia in September 1947 (and which is now part of Istria County, Croatia). (Note: After the Treaty of Rapallo, Istria was part of the Kingdom of Italy, but it became part of Yugoslavia at the end of World War II, as confirmed by the Treaty of Paris (1947).) She is the daughter of Erminia Pavichievaz and Vittorio Matticchio. Until 1956, she lived with her family in Yugoslavia, before her mother, her brother Franco and herself fled to Trieste, Italy, on the pretense of visiting their sick aunt Nina, who was a personal chef. This matched what many other Istrian Italians did during the Istrian-Dalmatian exodus. Soon after, her father joined them in Trieste after he crossed the border into Italy at night. After Nina could only provide temporary shelter, Bastianich and her family became refugees at Risiera di San Sabba. According to Bastianich in a Public Television documentary, although a wealthy Triestine family hired her mother as a cook–housekeeper and her father as a limousine driver, they remained residents of the refugee camp. Two years later, their displaced persons application was granted to emigrate from Italy to the United States. In 1958, Bastianich and her family reached the United States, arriving in North Bergen, New Jersey, and later settling in Astoria, Queens, in New York City.

Bastianich gives credit for the family's new roots in the United States to their sponsor, Catholic Relief Services:

The Catholic Relief Services brought us here to New York; we had no one. They found a home for us. They found a job for my father. And ultimately, we settled. And I am the perfect example that if you give somebody a chance, especially here in the United States, one can find the way.

Bastianich started working part-time at the age of 14, during which she briefly worked at the Astoria bakery, Walken's Bakery, owned by Christopher Walken's parents. After graduating from high school, she began to work full-time at a pizzeria on the Upper West Side of Manhattan.

== Career ==
In the 1960s Lidia worked at Walken's Bakery on Broadway in Astoria, Queens NY which was owned by Christopher Walken's family.

=== From Queens to Manhattan (1971–1981) ===
In 1971, the Bastianiches opened their first restaurant, the tiny Buonavia, meaning "good road", in the Forest Hills section of Queens, with Bastianich as its hostess. They created their restaurant's menu by copying recipes from the most popular and successful Italian restaurants of the day, and they hired the best Italian-American chef that they could find.

After a brief break to deliver her second child Tanya, in 1972 Bastianich began training as the assistant chef at Buonavia, gradually learning enough to cook popular Italian dishes on her own.

The success of Buonavia led to the opening of the second restaurant in Queens, Villa Secondo. It was here that Bastianich gained the attention of local food critics and started to give live cooking demonstrations, a prelude to her future career as a television cooking show hostess.

In 1981, Bastianich's father died, and the family sold their two Queens restaurants and purchased a small Manhattan brownstone containing a pre-existing restaurant on the East Side of Manhattan near the 59th Street Bridge to Queens. They converted it into what would eventually become their flagship restaurant, Felidia (a contraction of "Felice" and "Lidia"). After renovations, Felidia opened to near-universal acclaim from their loyal following of food critics, including The New York Times, which gave Felidia three stars.

=== Expansion ===
Although Lidia and Felice sent their two children to college without expectations that either would go into the restaurant business, Joseph, who had frequently done odd jobs for his parents at Felidia, gave up his newly launched career as a Wall Street bond trader; in 1993, he convinced his parents to partner with him to open Becco (Italian for "peck, nibble, savor") in the Theater District in Manhattan. Like Felidia, Becco was an immediate success and led to the opening of additional restaurants outside New York City, including Lidia's Kansas City in 1998, and Lidia's Pittsburgh in 2001.

In 1993, Julia Child invited Bastianich to tape an episode of her Public Television series Julia Child: Cooking With Master Chefs, which featured acclaimed chefs from around the U.S., preparing dishes in their own home kitchens. The guest appearance gave Bastianich confidence and determination to expand the Bastianich family's own commercial interests.

By the late 1990s, Bastianich's restaurants had evolved into a truly family-owned and operated enterprise. Bastianich's mother, Erminia Motika, maintained the large garden behind the family home, from which Bastianich chose ingredients to use in recipe development. Joe was the chief sommelier of the restaurant group, in addition to branching out into his own restaurant line. Bastianich's daughter Tanya Bastianich Manuali used her PhD in Italian art history as the foundation for a travel agency partnership with her mother called Esperienze Italiane, through which Tanya and friend Shelly Burgess Nicotra, who was the Executive Producer of Bastianich's television series and head of PR at Lidia's Italy, offered tours throughout Italy. Tanya's husband, attorney Corrado Manuali, became the restaurant group's chief legal counsel.

In 2010, Bastianich and her son partnered with Oscar Farinetti to open Eataly, a 50,000-square-foot (4,600 m^{2}) food emporium in Manhattan that is devoted to the food and culinary traditions of Italy. Bastianich offers culinary and gastronomy classes to the public at Eataly's school, La Scuola. Eataly's motto is "We sell what we cook, and we cook what we sell". Eataly is now in Chicago and São Paulo, Brazil. They opened a second store in New York at the World Trade Center in Manhattan in 2016 and another one in Boston the same year. Recent openings include Eataly in Los Angeles in 2017, in Las Vegas in 2018, in Toronto in 2019, Silicon Valley in 2022, and Dallas.

The fall of 2010 also marked the debut of Lidia's Kitchen, an exclusive line of commercial cookware, and serving ware for QVC. Along with her daughter Tanya, and son-in-law Corrado Manuali, Bastianich launched Nonna Foods as a platform to distribute an array of both existing and new LIDIA'S food products. Nonna Foods has 11 varieties of sauces (including two USDA Certified Organic sauces) available nationwide. Together with her son Joseph, Bastianich produces wine at Bastianich Vineyard in Friuli Venezia Giulia and La Mozza Vineyard in Maremma, Italy.

=== Television (1998–present) ===
In 1998, Public Television offered Bastianich her own television series; the show became Lidia's Italian Table. It established her as a fixture in the network's line-up of cooking shows. Since then she has hosted additional public television series, including Lidia's Family Table, Lidia's Italy, Lidia's Italy in America, and Lidia's Kitchen.

She also hosts a series of hour-long Public Television specials called Lidia Celebrates America, which premiered in 2011 with Lidia Celebrates America: Holiday Tables & Traditions. In the series, Bastianich celebrates the diversity of cultures across the United States and explores the American immigrant experience. The following special, Lidia Celebrates America: Weddings – Something Borrowed, Something New, aired in 2012; Lidia Celebrates America: Freedom & Independence in 2013; Lidia Celebrates America: Life's Milestones in 2013; Lidia Celebrates America: Holiday Tables and Traditions in 2015; Lidia Celebrates America: Holiday for Heroes in 2016; Lidia Celebrates America: Homegrown Heroes in 2017; Lidia Celebrates America: A Heartland Holiday Feast in 2018; Lidia Celebrates America: The Return of the Artisans in 2019; Lidia Celebrates America: Eating in With Lidia in 2020; Lidia Celebrates America: A Salute to First Responders in 2020; Lidia Celebrates America: Overcoming the Odds in 2021 and Lidia Celebrates America: Flavors that Define Us in 2023. Bastianich ends each episode of her show with an invitation to join her and her family for a meal, Tutti a tavola a mangiare! (Italian for "Everyone to the table to eat").

For the 2010 holiday season, her new television production company, Tavola Productions, created an animated holiday children's special for Public Television "Lidia's Christmas Kitchen: Nonna Tell Me a Story" to go along with the book by the same title that was written by Bastianich.

In 2013, Bastianich returned to Public Television with Lidia's Kitchen, a 26-part series produced by Tavola Productions. The tenth season premiered in October 2022. Lidia's Kitchen Season 11 launches in October 2023.

Among Bastianich's television show appearances, she participated as a celebrity judge on MasterChef USA, an adaptation of the BBC MasterChef in 2000. Her son, Joseph Bastianich, would later go on to star as a celebrity judge on the Gordon Ramsay version of MasterChef. Bastianich has also appeared on the Italian television show Junior MasterChef Italia in 2014 and 2015 for Season 1 and Season 2. In 2016 and 2017, she was a judge for the Italian television show, La Prova del Cuoco. In 2020, alongside son Joe Bastianich and Antonino Cannavacciuolo, she was a judge on the cooking competition show on Sky, Family Food Fight. In 2021, Bastianich co-starred along with Italian chef Anna Moroni in Senti che fame! Nonna pensaci tu which aired on Discovery+ in Italy.

=== Books (1990–present) ===
Bastianich has authored several cookbooks to accompany her television series:

- La Cucina di Lidia
- Lidia's Family Table
- Lidia's Italian-American Kitchen
- Lidia's Italian Table
- Lidia's Italy
- Lidia Cooks from the Heart of Italy
- Lidia's Italy in America
- Lidia's Favorite Recipes
- Lidia's Commonsense Italian Cooking
- Nonna Tell Me A Story
- Nonna's Birthday Surprise
- Lidia's Egg-Citing Farm Adventure
- Lidia's Mastering the Art of Italian Cuisine
- Lidia's Celebrate Like an Italian
- My American Dream: A Life of Love, Family, and Food
- Felidia, Recipes from My Flagship Restaurant
- Lidia's a Pot, a Pan, and a Bowl: Simple Recipes for Perfect Meals
- Lidia's From Our Family Table to Yours

== Awards and honors ==
- (1987) Recipient of Woman of the Year/Innovation Award, Restaurant Category, Women's Institute of the Center for Food and Hotel Management
- (1993) Nominated for "Best Chef in New York" by the James Beard Foundation; Felidia
- (1994) Nominated for "Best Chef in New York" by the James Beard Foundation; Felidia
- (1996) Nominated for "Best Chef in New York" by the James Beard Foundation; Felidia
- (1996) Recipient of "Who's Who of Food & Beverage in America" James Beard Award
- (1997) Nominated for "Best Chef in New York" by the James Beard Foundation; Felidia
- (1998) Nominated for "Best Chef in New York" by the James Beard Foundation; Felidia
- (1999) Named "Best Chef in New York" by the James Beard Foundation
- (2001) Lidia's Italian-American Kitchen wins International Association Culinary Professionals (IACP) cookbook Award in "Chefs and restaurants" category
- (2002) Lidia's Italian-American Kitchen nominated for James Beard Award in "Best National Television Cooking Show or Special" category
- (2002) Named "Best Outstanding Chef" by the James Beard Foundation
- (2002) Named "The First Lady of Italian Cuisine and Restaurants in the United States" by Senator George Onorato
- (2007) Lidia's Family Table nominated for James Beard Award in "National Television Food Show" category
- (2008) Lidia's Italy: 140 Simple and Delicious Recipes from the Ten Places in Italy Lidia Loves Most nominated for James Beard Award in "International Book" category
- (2008) Lidia's Italy nominated for Emmy Award
- (2009) Lidia's Italy named "Best Cooking Show" by the James Beard Foundation
- (2010) Lidia Cooks From the Heart of Italy nominated for James Beard Award in "International Book" category
- (2011) Lidia Celebrates America receives highest honor of Silver Award for in Film/Video Silver Winners category for the 32nd Annual Telly Awards
- (2012) Lidia Celebrates America: Holiday Tables & Traditions nominated for "Outstanding Documentary" by the James Beard Foundation
- (2013) Wins Emmy for "Outstanding Culinary Host"
- (2013) Inducted into Culinary Hall of Fame
- (2013) Lidia Celebrates America: Something Borrowed Something New receives New York Festivals Award
- (2014) Three Tavola productions- Lidia's Kitchen, Lidia Celebrates America, and Amy Thielen's Heartland Table on the Food Network nominated for a James Beard Award
- (2014) Lidia Celebrates America: Freedom and Independence receives Telly Award
- (2014) Lidia Celebrates America nominated for a Rockie Award at Banff World Media Festival in "Lifestyle" category
- (2016) Lidia Celebrates America: Home for the Holidays wins "Best Special" by the James Beard Foundation
- (2016) Lidia Celebrates America: Home for the Holidays named "Best Food Program" at Taste Awards
- (2017) Nominated for a Daytime Emmy Award in "Outstanding Culinary Host" category
- (2017) Lidia Celebrates America: Holiday for Heroes wins James Beard Award for "Best Special"
- (2017) Recipient of the StellaRe Prize by the Sandretto Re Rebaudengo Foundation
- (2018) Wins Daytime Emmy Award in "Outstanding Culinary Host" category
- (2018) Lidia's Kitchen nominated for a Daytime Emmy Award in "Best Culinary Program" category
- (2018) Lidia Celebrates America: Homegrown Heroes wins James Beard Award for "Best Special"
- (2018) Lidia Celebrates America: Home Grown Heroes recipient of Gold Telly Award in "General Documentary: Individual" category
- (2019) Lidia's Kitchen nominated for a Daytime Emmy Award in "Outstanding Culinary Program" category
- (2019) Recipient of Master of the Aesthetics of Gastronomy Award from Culinary Institute of America
- (2019) Awarded the Premio Artusi by the Scientific Committee of Casa Artusi
- (2022) American Public Television Silver Award
- (2023) Recipient of Taste Award
- (2023) Recipient of honorary degree from Manhattan College and commencement speaker
- (2023) Recipient of WHYY's Lifelong Learning Award
- (2023) Recipient of MenuMasters Award

=== Other awards and honors ===
- (1996) Recipient of Distinguished Service Award and recognized for "Outstanding contribution and dedicated service to the Italian-American Community" by the Italian Government
- (1999) Honored as "Commendatore" of the Republic of Italy
- (2000) Golden Whisk Award by Women Chefs and Restaurateurs
- (2002) "La Bellisima America" Award from Italian American Museum
- (2007) Honors Award from Careers through Culinary Arts Program (C-CAP)
- (2007) Grand Marshal of the Columbus Day Parade in New York City
- (2008) Chef for Papal Celebration; Pope Benedict XVI during visit to New York City
- (2008) Recipient of Bpeace's first-ever Economic Impact Award
- (2008) Honored as commander ("Commendatore") by the then President of Italy, Giorgio Napolitano
- (2008) Guest at Dinner honoring Italian prime minister at the White House; Washington
- (2009) Honoree at Great Chefs event to benefit Greenwich Health at Greenwich Hospital
- (2009) National Italian American Foundation (NIAF) Special Achievement Award for humanitarian service
- (2010) Bastianich family honored by the National Organization of Italian American Women (NOIAW) for their outstanding contributions to Italian culture in America.
- (2012) Recipient of Lifetime Achievement Award at Healthcare Chaplaincy Wholeness of Life Awards Dinner
- (2013) Honored at The Philips Collection Annual Gala
- (2015) Chef for Papal Celebration; Pope Francis during visit to New York City
- (2015) Italian Talent Award by The Italian Talent Association
- (2015) Augie Award at the Annual Culinary Institute of America Leadership Awards
- (2016) Lifetime Achievement Award from Women with Wings and Wisdom
- (2016) Spirit Award from Kansas City Women in Film and Television
- (2016) Honored at Les Dames d'Escoffier Fundraiser Gala; Vancouver
- (2017) Queens Ambassador Awards from Community News Group
- (2017) Recipient of Grand Dame Award by the Les Dames D' Escoffier International
- (2017) Recipient of StellaRe Prize by the Sandretto Re Rebaudengo Foundation
- (2018) Celebrity Champion for "Adopt-A-Future" campaign by UNA-USA/The UN Refugee Agency
- (2018) Bastianich Family recipient of Award from Italian Heritage & Culture Committee of New York, Inc. (IHCC-NY, Inc.)
- (2018) Honored at annual Cardinal's Christmas Luncheon and recipient of the Christmas Angel Award
- (2018) Recipient of The One America Award for Entrepreneurship by NIAF
- (2019) Honored at Histria Association of Women 30th Anniversary Dinner
- (2019) Honored at the 15th Annual Hamptons Happening Event by the Samuel Waxman Cancer Research Foundation
- (2019) Keynote Speaker at Fifth Annual Food Lab Conference at Stony Brook Southampton
- (2019) Recipient of Spirit of Arrupe Award from Loyola University Chicago
- (2019) Honored at Jesuit Refuge Service/USA 39th Anniversary Dinner
- (2019) Guest of honor at Luncheon honoring women in culinary world hosted by Les Dames d' Escoffier, Austin Chapter & Austin Food & Wine Alliance
- (2020) Hosted fundraising event at Our Lady of the Blessed Sacrament Catholic Academy
- (2020) Honored by The Stamford Museum & Nature Center at Annual charity Event 'An Evening with Lidia Bastianich'
- (2020) Special guest at Long Island 'Taste the Greats' event

== Personal life ==
After World War II, her family's name was Croaticized from Matticchio to Motika. Although she and her family claim to be Italian, a DNA test indicated that her family is largely of Eastern European descent, due to the multiethnicity of Istria. Concerning her identity, Lidia has stated: "I feel very Italian, but I do have some Slavic in me, and I relate to that as well; so that forms the mixture that is Lidia."

At her sweet sixteen birthday party, she was introduced to her future husband, Felice "Felix" Bastianich, a fellow Istrian Italian immigrant and restaurant worker from Labin, on the eastern coast of Istria, Croatia. The couple married in 1966 and Lidia gave birth to their son, Joe, in 1968. Their second child, Tanya, was born in 1972.

After many disagreements about the direction their entrepreneurial and personal lives had taken (most notably, the pace of the expansion and character of their business), Lidia and Felice divorced in 1998. Bastianich continued expanding her business while Felice transferred his shares in the business to their two children. He died on December 12, 2010, from complications due to diabetes.

Bastianich lives in Douglaston, Queens; she lived with her mother, Erminia Motika, until her death in February 2021. Bastianich's own kitchen has served as the stage set for four of her television series, and the garden that Erminia maintained provided many of the ingredients featured in the shows. Erminia, who answered to "grandma", frequently served as a sous-chef in various episodes of the television series.

Joe Bastianich occasionally appears in his mother's series to offer wine expertise. He, his wife Deanna, and their three children live in New York City.

Tanya Bastianich Manuali, with her husband Corrado Manuali, lives in Arizona. Tanya is integrally involved in the production of Lidia's public television series as an owner and Executive Producer of Tavola Productions and is active daily in the family restaurant business.

In an interview by American Public Television, Bastianich spoke of how important it is for her to pass on family traditions:

Food for me was a connecting link to my grandmother, to my childhood, to my past. And what I found out is that for everybody, food is a connector to their roots, to their past in different ways. It gives you security; it gives you a profile of who you are, where you come from.

In 2011, Bastianich was accused of keeping an indentured servant. The subsequent lawsuit was dismissed in 2012 by a lower court that held that the plaintiff was not a slave because she received health insurance, room and board and other perks in lieu of getting paid.

== Philanthropy ==
Lidia Bastianich is an active member of society who participates in community service activities and special events on behalf of several foundations. She is a member of Les Dames d'Escoffier and a founding member of Women Chefs and Restaurateurs, two non-profit organizations of women leaders in the food and hospitality industries. She is also a champion for the United Nations Association of the United States of America's Adopt-A-Future program, in support of refugee education.

Bastianich was on the Board of the Arrupe College, a higher education program founded by the Loyola University of Chicago for underprivileged students, and regularly hosts Fundraisers for the program at Eataly in Chicago. BoysGrow, a local non-profit vocational training program, is another organization that she works with by hosting annual Benefit Dinners since 2013 at her restaurant Lidia's in Kansas City. In addition, she has helped raise funds for United Nations Development Fund for Women (UNIFEM) – now known as UN Women – as co-chair of charity events and Benefit Dinners throughout her career. She is also involved with Jesuit Refugee Service, The Child Center of NY and hosts at classes at August Martin High School in Queens, New York.

Bastianich is also actively involved with various non-profit organizations that are focused on promoting and celebrating Italian and Italian-American culture and heritage. She is part of the National Organization of Italian American Women's Distinguished Board, a national organization for women of Italian ancestry that focuses on preserving Italian heritage, language and culture. In 2010, the Bastianich family was honored by NOIAW for their outstanding contributions to Italian culture in America.

She supports the Columbus Citizens Foundation, a non-profit organization focused on promoting and celebrating Italian-American heritage. She was the grand marshal of the Columbus Day Parade in New York City in 2007, and an honorary guest at the 2016 Columbus Celebration Kickoff Event at Eataly Downtown in New York City.

Moreover, Bastianich has worked with the Italian American Committee on Education (IACE), a New York-based non-profit organization that promotes the study of Italian language and culture, by visiting elementary schools and speaking to students as a guest speaker, such as in 2011 in Harlem and in 2014 in the Bronx. In 2014, Bastianich led the committee that determined the winners of a contest initiative launched by Eataly and IACE for students.

== See also ==
- List of celebrities who own wineries and vineyards
