= Tracy Malechek-Ezekiel =

- Born: Tomball, Texas
- Education: University of Houston, Culinary Institute of America
- Spouse: Arjav Ezekiel
- Culinary career
- Current restaurant(s): Birdie's
- Award(s) won: Food & Wine Restaurant of the Year 2023

Tracy Malechek-Ezekiel is an American chef and restaurateur. In 2023 her restaurant Birdie's in Austin, Texas, was named by Food & Wine their Restaurant of the Year.

== Early life and education ==
Malechek-Ezekiel was born and raised in Tomball, Texas, near Houston. She spent summers on her grandparents' sheep and goat ranch in west Texas. Her grandfather, Phil Aiello, moved to Brooklyn from Calabria when he was twelve.

She graduated from the University of Houston. She graduated from the Culinary Institute of America at Hyde Park, New York.

== Career ==
After graduating from the University of Houston, Malechek-Ezekiel worked in Spain; in Chicago, where she worked at Lula Cafe; and in New York City, where she worked at Cru, Del Posto, Blue Hill, Gramercy Tavern and Untitled.

In 2021 she and her husband, sommelier Arjav Ezekiel, opened Birdie's, a counter-service wine bar in Austin, Texas. The restaurant's service model, which Austin Monthly calls a "new take", maintains a minimal front-of-house staff; it takes no reservations, all diners stand in line to place their initial orders and seat themselves, and further service is not assigned to a single server. It closes for two weeks in August and two weeks in late December/early January to provide staff paid time off. The restaurant was named to The New York Times 2021 Restaurant List. The Austin American-Statesman named it Austin's best new restaurant of 2021. It was named Food & Wine's 2023 Restaurant of the Year. The couple also run pop-up Italian restaurants called Aiello's after Malechek-Ezekiel's grandfather.

== Reception ==
The New York Times in 2021 called her food "bright [and] graceful" and said she was on "the leading edge of what makes eating great in [Austin]". The Austin American-Statesman in 2021 called her food "straightforward food executed flawlessly". CBS's Jamie Wax, describing himself as a lifelong fan of beef tartare, called her version "the best tartare I've ever tasted"; the Austin American-Statesman's Matthew Odam also called out the dish, saying, "If there’s a better beef tartare in Austin,...I haven’t had it". In 2024 she was a James Beard Award finalist for Best Chef:Texas.

== Personal life ==
Malechek-Ezekiel married Arjav Ezekiel in 2018. The couple met in 2015 while both were working at Untitled in New York City, she as sous chef and he as dining room manager. They have a son.
