= Birdie's =

- Interactive map of Birdie's

Restaurant information
- Established: 2021
- Owners: Tracy Malechek-Ezekiel, Arjav Ezekiel
- Location: 2944 East 12th Street, Austin, Texas, 78702
- Coordinates: 30°16′35″N 97°42′17″W
- Website: www.birdiesaustin.com

Birdie's is a restaurant in Austin, Texas.The restaurant is among the most acclaimed in America and was named a Best New Restaurant by Bon Appetit Magazine, Esquire and landed on the inaugural issue of the New York Times "The Restaurant List," in 2021. in In 2023 it was named Food & Wine's Restaurant of the Year.Chef Tracy Malechek-Ezekiel was nominated for Best Chef Texas in 2024 by the James Beard Foundation and Arjav Ezekiel won the award for Outstanding Professional in Beverage Service in 2025. The New York Times's Eric Asimov in 2024 called it "one of the most acclaimed restaurants in the country". Birdie's has been listed on the Michelin Guide since its arrival in Texas in 2024 and both Arjav Ezekiel & Tracy Malechek-Ezekiel were named to the Time 100 Next list in 2025.

== History ==
The restaurant was opened in 2021 by chef Tracy Malechek-Ezekiel and sommelier Arjav Ezekiel, who are husband and wife.

== Business and service models ==
Birdie's is a counter-service restaurant with an extensive wine list. It was the first restaurant in the country to pioneer counter-service for fine dining as a response to the financial pressures most restaurants face. The ground breaking restaurant model has served as inspiration for several other restaurants that have opened with or transitioned to counter service around America including Rye Bunny in Washington, DC and John's Food and Wine in Chicago.

The restaurant's business and service models, which Austin Monthly calls a "new take", maintain a minimal front-of-house staff; it takes limited reservations, diners stand in line to place their initial orders and seat themselves. The model that was pioneered by Birdie's is often referenced as Fine Casual referencing the casual ordering format, but hospitality forward dining room and technique driven kitchen.

The restaurant has also been a cultural landmark for restaurants with the benefits they offer which includes two weeks of holiday in August and two weeks in late December/early January to provide staff paid time off. It offers paid family leave, 401k benefits, and health insurance.

The restaurant is open Tuesday through Saturday. It sometimes closes to become a pop-up Italian restaurant called Aiello's, named after Malechek-Ezekiel's grandfather, who immigrated from Calabria.

== Reception ==
The restaurant was named to the New York Times's 2021 Restaurant List. The Austin American-Statesman named it Austin's best new restaurant of 2021. Birdie's was also named a Best New Restaurant by Bon Appetit and Esquire Magazine.

In 2023 Food & Wine named Birdie's its Restaurant of the Year, calling it "the restaurant that everyone wants in their neighborhood". According to the New York Times' Eric Asimov, writing in 2024, it is "one of the most acclaimed restaurants in the country". Robb Report named it one of the 100 Greatest Restaurants of the 21st Century in 2025 and Food & Wine Magazine named it the #4 restaurant in America in 2024.
