= Top Gear Italia =

Italian television series

- Genre: Motoring
- Created by: BBC Worldwide
- Based on: Top Gear by BBC
- Developed by: Toro Media
- Presented by: Davide Valsecchi; Guido Meda; Joe Bastianich
- Starring: The Stig
- Country of origin: Italy
- Original language: Italian
- No. of seasons: 1
- No. of episodes: 6

Production
- Running time: 45 minutes
- Production company: Toro Media

Original release
- Network: Sky Uno
- Release: March 22 – April 26, 2016

Related
- Top Gear (franchise)

Top Gear Italia is an Italian motoring show, which was first broadcast on 22 March 2016 on Sky Uno. It is an international version of the British BBC Two motoring show, Top Gear. This version of the show is presented by Davide Valsecchi, Guido Meda and Joe Bastianich. It also features the Italian version of "The Stig".

== History ==
It was reported by The Guardian on 27 July 2015 that Sky Italy had purchased the right to the format and that Guido Meda (a presenter for the Italian version of Sky Sports and commentator of the Moto GP), Joe Bastianich (previously a judge on MasterChef Italia) and a then unconfirmed third host would be the presenters of the localised version. Later in the year, it was revealed that the third presenter would be Davide Valsecchi, known for motorsport in Italy, through his personal Twitter account. Sky released an official statement on 16 February 2016 revealing that filming would take place between 18 February and 1 March of that year with the first episode airing on 22 March, it also revealed that a test track had been set up at the Biella-Cerrione Airport.

== Challenges ==
In one challenge, the contestants built a popemobile for 5000 Euros.

== Episodes ==
No.	Title	Reviews	Features/challenges	Guest(s)	Original release date
1	Episode 1	LaFerrari	Race across Rome (Audi R8 • Jaguar F-type SVR • Ford Mustang)	Cristiana Capotondi	22 March 2016
2	Episode 2	Lamborghini Huracán	Car road trip (McLaren P1 • Jaguar XFR • Volkswagen Golf)	Max Gazzè	29 March 2016
3	Episode 3	Porsche 911 GT3	SUV challenge (Land Rover Range Rover • Land Rover Mk1 • Porsche Macan)	Alessandro Borghi • Alessandro Roja	5 April 2016
4	Episode 4	BMW i8	Caravan drag race (Dodge Caravan • Nissan Caravan • Chevrolet Caravan)	Claudio Bisio	12 April 2016
5	Episode 5	Aston Martin DB11	Top Gear Awards	Ciro Priello • Simone Ruzzo	19 April 2016
6	Episode 6	Mercedes-Benz AMG C63	Best of Top Gear	Cesare Cremonini	26 April 2016
