= Don Mills Centre =

Former shopping mall in Toronto, Ontario, Canada

Coordinates: 43.735°N 79.345°W

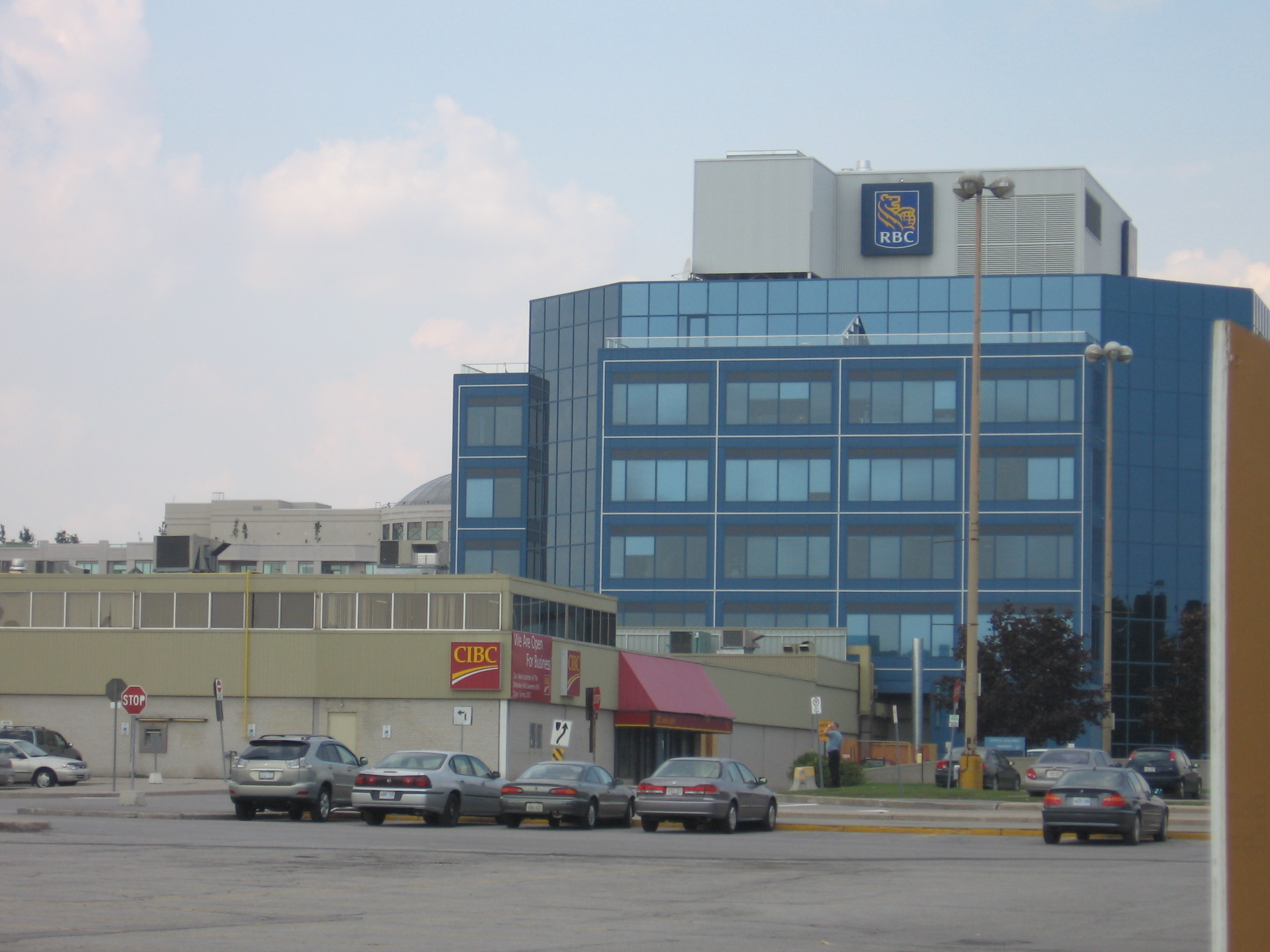
The centre during demolition in 2006

The Don Mills Centre was a shopping mall in Toronto, Ontario, Canada. It was located on a 44-acre (17.8 ha) commercial site, at the southwest corner of Don Mills Road and Lawrence Avenue East in Toronto. There were at least 98 stores during the height of the mall's existence. The majority of the mall was closed and demolished in summer 2006 for redevelopment as the Shops at Don Mills.

== History ==
E. P. Taylor of Argus Corporation originally bought the land for a brewing plant, but decided to make the site the focal point of the 2,100-acre (850 ha) planned community. Initial construction of the Don Mills Centre began in 1954. In 1955, a strip plaza was opened with a Dominion supermarket, Kofflers Drug Store (the first Shoppers Drug Mart), Brewers Retail and a dozen other retailers.

Don Mills Centre was primarily intended to serve the local community, centrally located within walking distance of many rental units built around the core of the community, which included a sizeable population of senior citizens and the disabled.

By 1965, the Dominion supermarket had relocated into a larger store at the south end, Zellers moved in and an outdoor mall expanded to 65 stores.

In 1978, a major renovation was undertaken to enclose the mall. The mall was expanded from 400,000 to 462,000 square feet (37,000 to 43,000 m^{2}).

After its closure in the 1990s, the lower level of the Eaton's store was converted to a Sears Canada outlet store, which later closed. The store once again stood empty for some time until it was leased by a sporting goods store, National Sports. The store then left the site after two years and was replaced by a patio furniture store and a used car dealership.

Increased competition from other shopping malls and the closure of main anchor tenant T. Eaton Co. meant declines in mall revenues and the exodus of many fashion retailers. Longtime tenants in the mall reported that they still remained profitable, but mall owner Cadillac Fairview (CF) had not been offering long-term leases for a while, purportedly to discourage new retailers from getting established. CF put forth redevelopment proposals in 2004 which would renovate the existing mall and add expansions. However in 2006, CF claimed that the property was in poor condition at an Ontario Municipal Board hearing on 29 May 2006 to justify demolishing the mall and rebuilding it as an urban lifestyle village. Nearby residents regarded the existing mall as a community centre, and criticized CF's latest redevelopment plan as failing to serve their needs.

== Demolition and redevelopment ==
The majority of the mall was closed and demolished in summer 2006 for redevelopment, so CF provided a shuttle bus to Fairview Mall for a few years, until Shops at Don Mills opened.

The Shoppers Drug Mart opened in late April 2007, which was the chain's 1000th store. A CIBC branch opened at the same time. As of early October 2008, Jack Astor's had re-opened. The first phase of an urban village, the Shops at Don Mills, consisting of 100 retailers and services opened on April 22, 2009.

Home Hardware relocated to 49 The Donway West, on the south side of the Mall property, where The Beer Store, Blockbuster Video and Royal LePage Realty had long been located. In June 2013, this series of buildings at 49 The Donway West was demolished. Shoppers Drug Mart and CIBC built new locations on the north-east corner of Lawrence Avenue East and The Donway West.

Dominion (now Metro) and the Royal Bank Building are the only remainders of the old mall.

== Former tenants ==
Former Anchor tenants of the Don Mills Centre included:

- Home Hardware
- Eaton's — became Sears Canada clearance centre and later as National Sports
- Zellers — closed and demolished
- Dominion — now Metro

Bittner's Meat and Deli operated at Don Mills Plaza for many years.

== Pictures ==
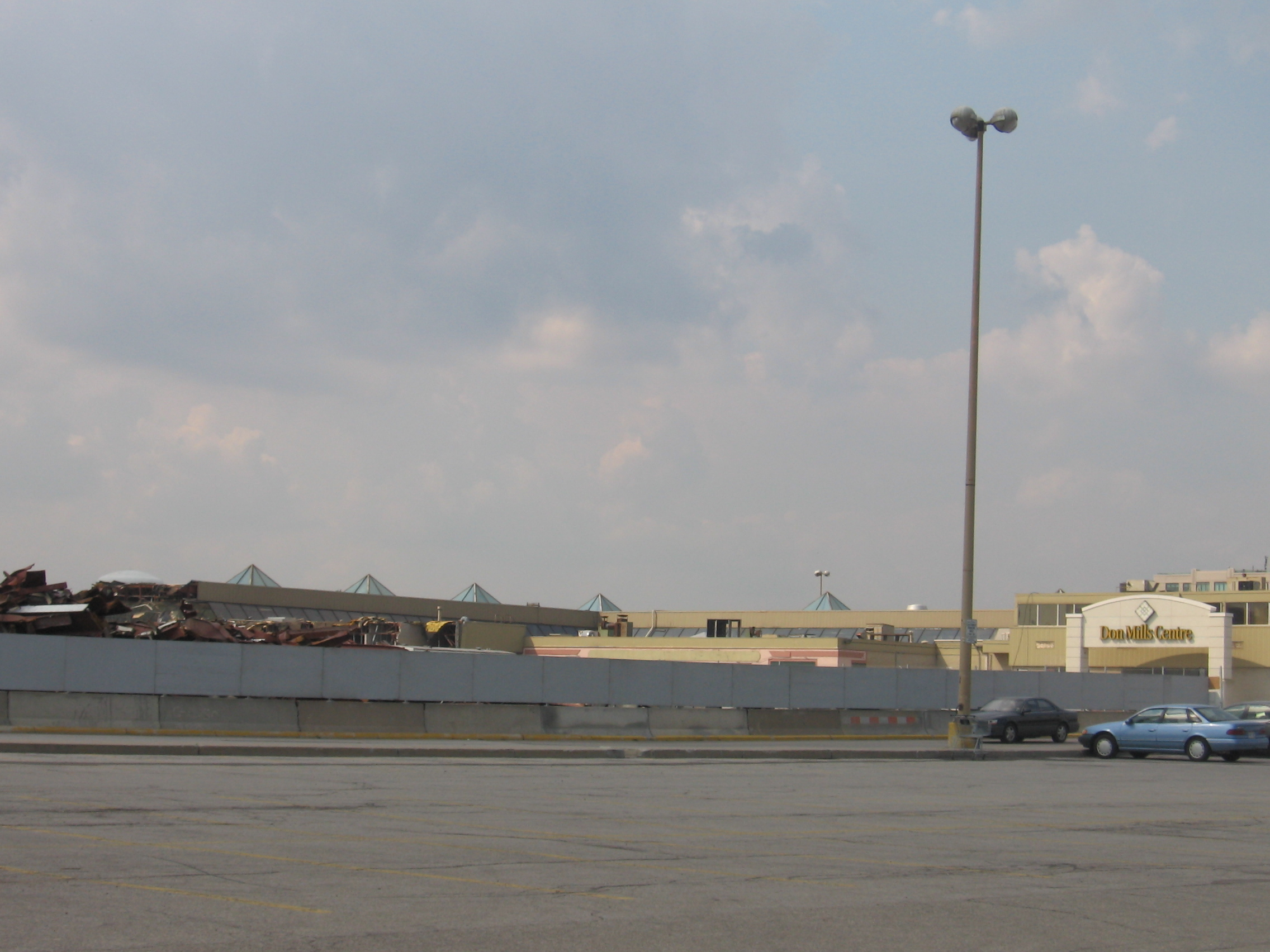
Remains of the southern section

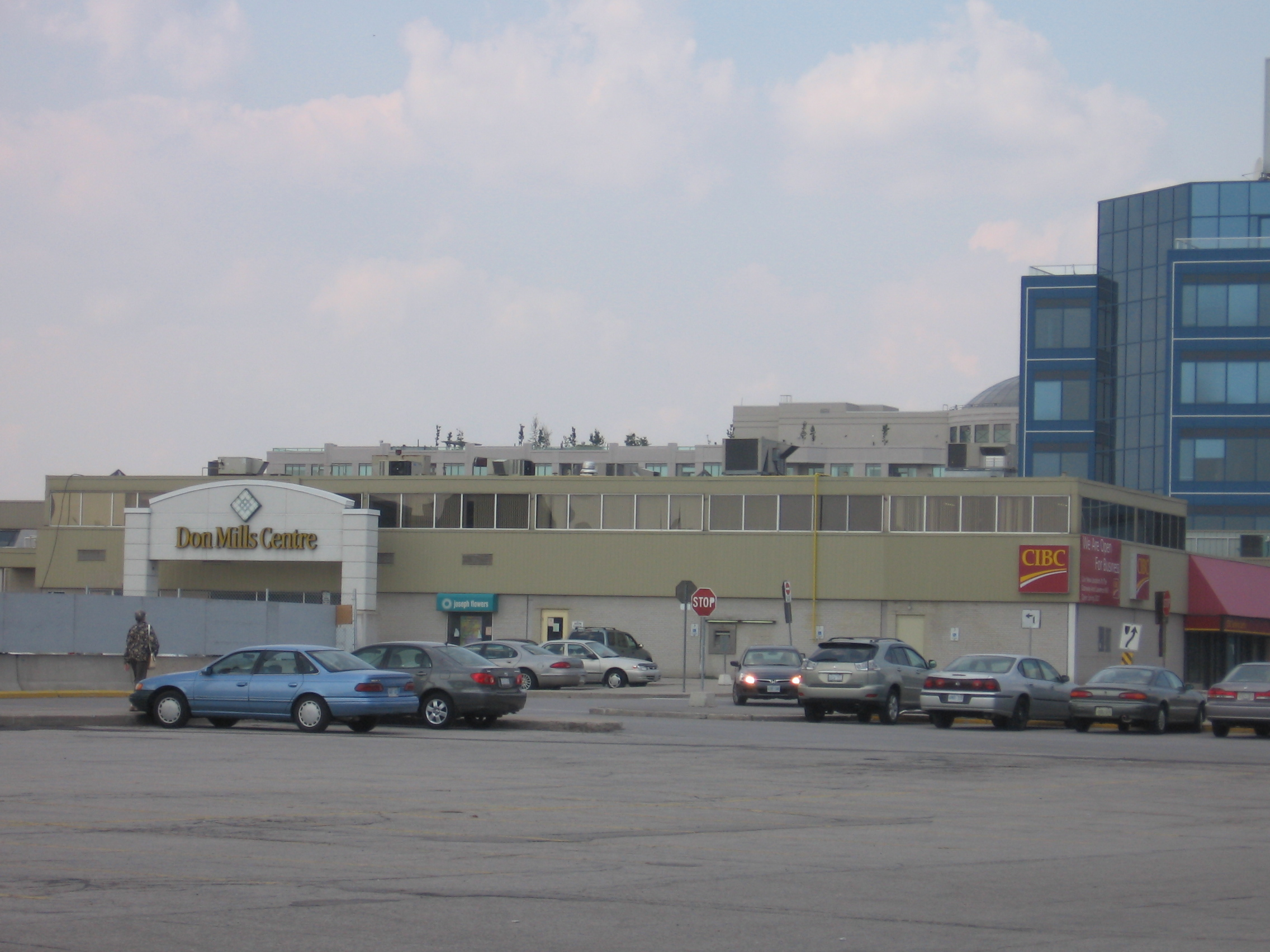
CIBC

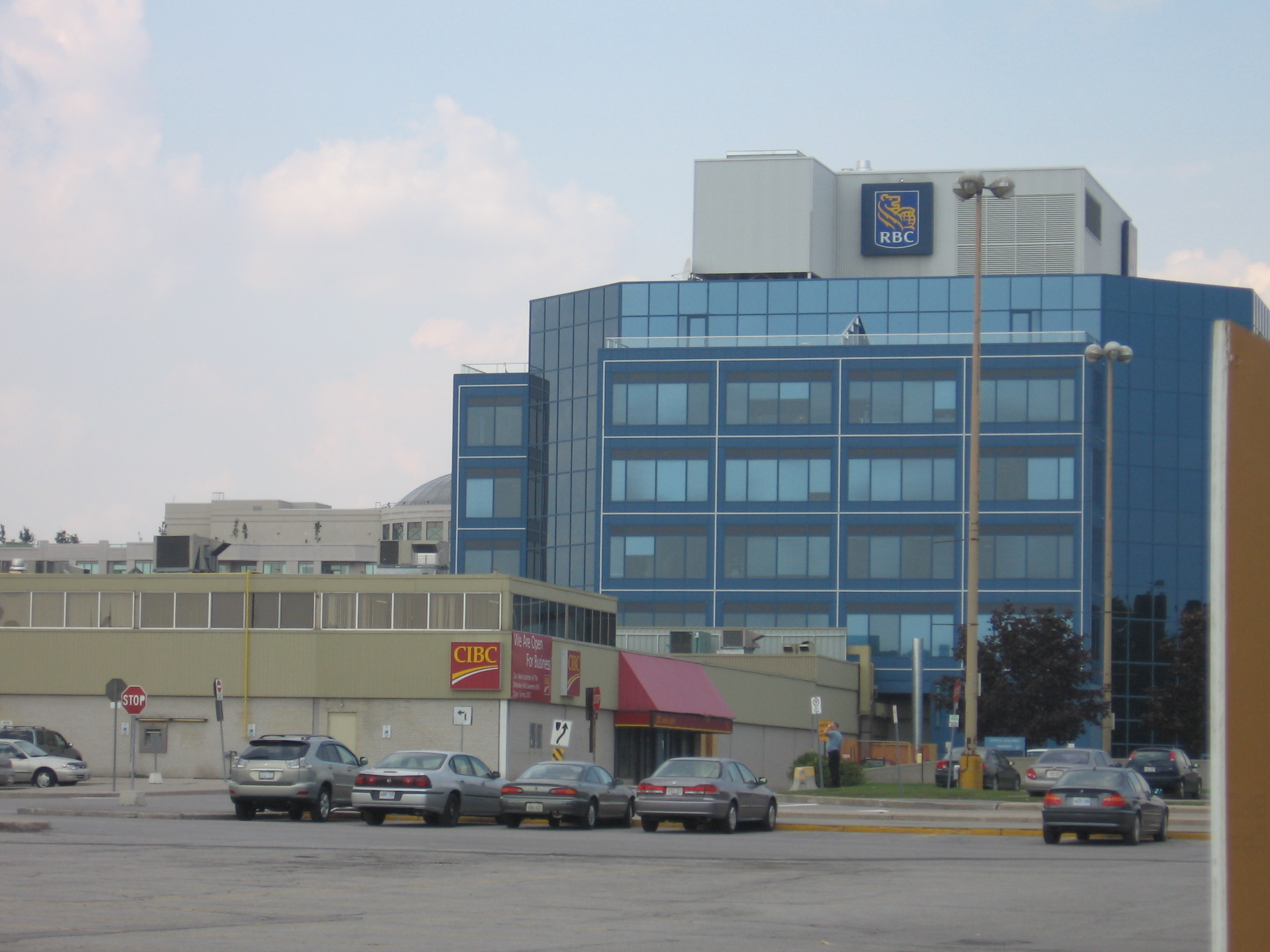
Royal Bank building

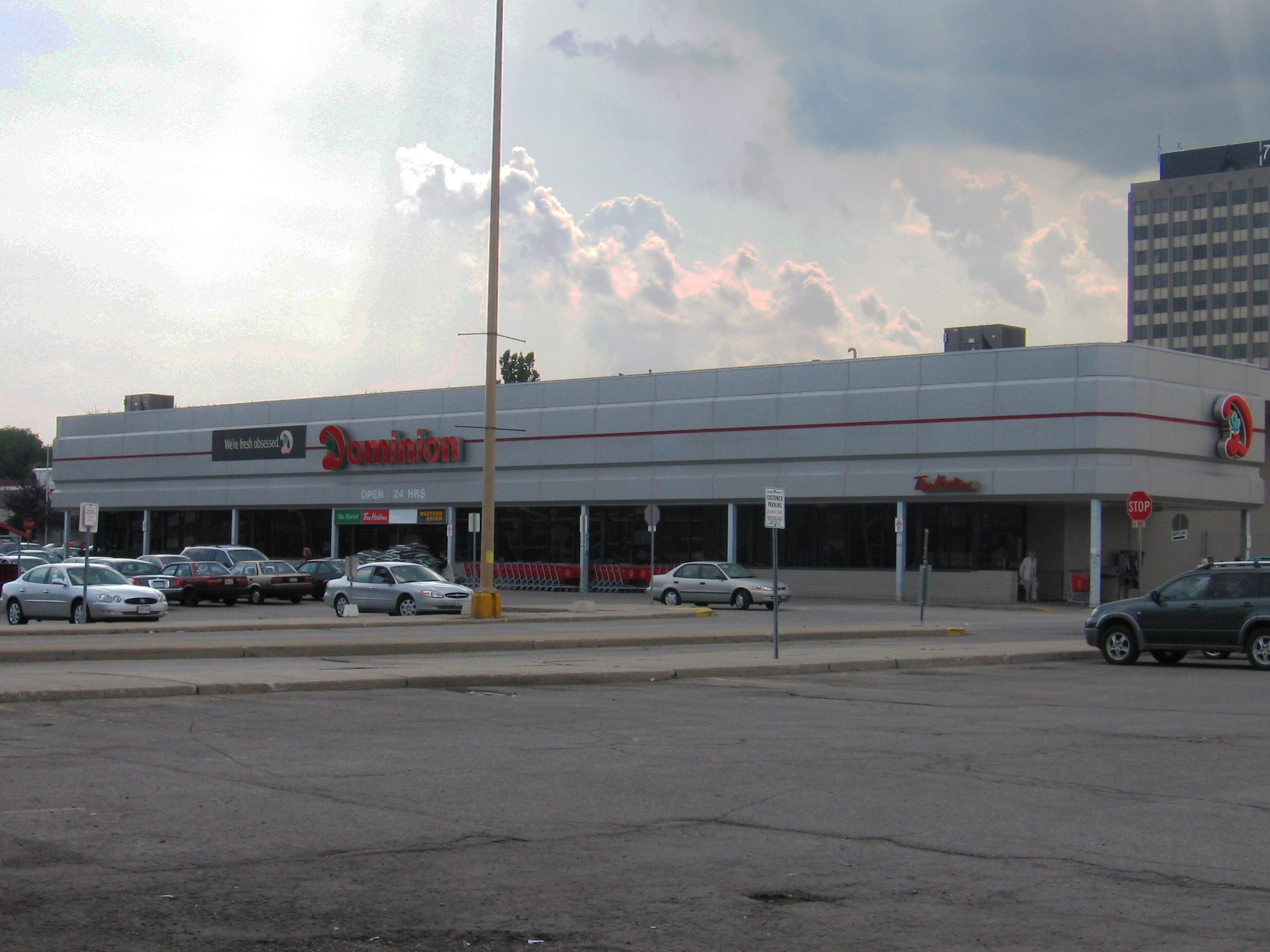
Dominion
