= Shops at Don Mills =

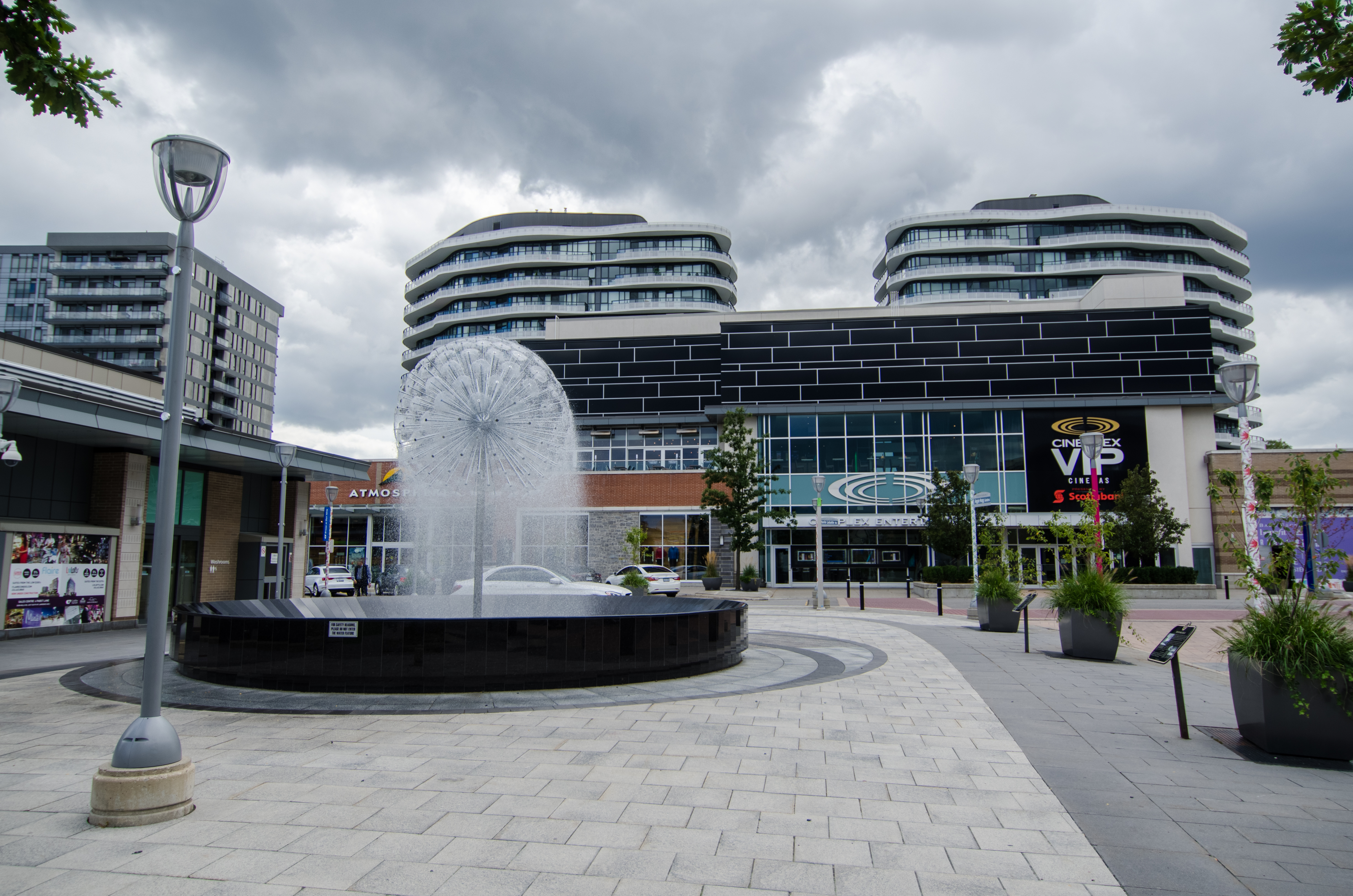
- Location: Toronto, Ontario, Canada
- Coordinates: 43.735°N 79.345°W
- Address: 1090 Don Mills Road
- Opened: 2009
- Developer: commercial: Cadillac Fairview residential: FRAM Building Group, Lanterra Developments
- Manager: Ilene Klein – Cadillac Fairview
- Owner: Cadillac Fairview
- Architect: Harry Pellow - Pellow + Associates Architects and Ralph Giannone of Giannone Petricone Associates Inc
- Num. of stores: 72
- Floor area: 511,824 square feet (48,000 m^{2})
- Floors: 1 to 2
- Website: shopsatdonmills.ca

The Shops at Don Mills (corporately known as CF Shops at Don Mills) is a lifestyle centre-type shopping centre in Toronto, Ontario, Canada, located at Don Mills Road and Lawrence Avenue East. There are 72 retail stores with a total floor space of 47,550 square metres (or 511,824 square feet). Cadillac Fairview is the owner and manager of the shopping centre.

== Character ==
Storefronts face a network of private internal streets centred on a square which includes a clock tower, a fountain and interpretive historical plaques about the neighbourhood. The layout is similar to a regular neighbourhood retail area. On-site parking is available along the internal streets, in surface lots along the east side of the shopping centre and within a multi-level parkade at the west side. Prominent tenants (with floor space) include: McEwan Fine Foods (22,000 sq ft), Anthropologie (7,000 sq ft), and Eataly (9,800 sq ft).

The 10-metre (33 ft) clock tower in the square is an artwork by Douglas Coupland. The top of the tower sports a cluster of miniature houses, evocative of housing development in the Don Mills area. A piece of wall-art is displayed on the Lawrence Avenue side; it was preserved following the demolition of a nearby 1962 Eatons department store building.

Cadillac Fairview is promoting condominium buildings adjacent to Shops at Don Mills. These are being developed by FRAM Building Group and Lanterra Developments. A park and public spaces are also to be included in the community as part of Cadillac Fairview's master plan.

== History ==
The centre is located on the site of the demolished Don Mills Centre shopping mall. Increased competition from other shopping malls and the closure of main anchor tenant T. Eaton Co. meant declines in mall revenues and the exodus of many fashion retailers. The mall owner, developer Cadillac Fairview, decided to redevelop the site in 2003 to attract more up-scale retailers and shoppers, without a main anchor tenant. The developer proposed to demolish the indoor shopping mall and replace it with an open-air setting, along with an intensification of the site. The intensification meant the construction of a parking garage to replace the large surface parking lot. The development also included using Centre lands for new residential buildings. After community consultation, the plan was approved by the City of Toronto and the development proceeded. The Shops at Don Mills opened on April 22, 2009.

McNally Robinson, a Canadian book-selling chain, was one of the first tenants, but the chain later decided to close the location in 2009, the same year it opened, due to a bankruptcy restructuring. The store had 1,900 m^{2} (20,000 sq ft) of retail space including an 80-seat restaurant.

On August 15, 2014, Cineplex VIP Cinemas Don Mills opened at the Shops at Don Mills. It has five auditoriums with a combined capacity of 500 seats.

In August 2017, Shops at Don Mills completed a $21 million renovation, improving on accessibility, the outdoor setting and summer programming.

On May 30, 2024, Eataly opened its third location in Toronto within the shopping centre. The food hall occupies two retail spaces having a combined area of almost 910 m^{2} (9,800 sq ft).

== Street names ==
A number of roads and driveways located in the development are named after prominent community members of the Don Mills area:

- Clock Tower Road - named to identify the location of the Clock Tower at the corner of the Town Square.
- Aggie Hogg Gardens - named for former resident, storekeeper, postmaster and daughter of settler John Hogg
- O'Neill Road - named for local settler James O'Neill (arrived 1845)
- Karl Fraser Road - Karl Fraser, first CEO of Don Mills Development and assistant to developer E.P. Taylor
- Leadly Lane - named for local settler Allison Leadley (arrived 1850)
- Pabst Lane - named for local settler Rudolph Pabst (arrived 1814)
- Marie Labatte Road - named for former North York Councillor for Ward 10 and Metro Councillor for Don Parkway Marie Labatte (1925–2004)
- Sampson Mews - named for local settler James Sampson (arrived 1838)
- Maginn Mews - named for merchant, school trustee and politician Charles Maginn (arrived 1841)
