= Oscar Farinetti =

Italian businessman and investor (born 1954)

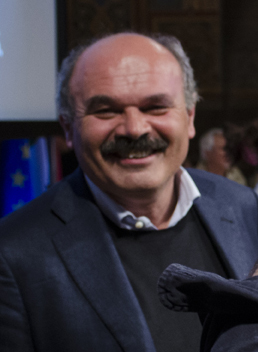
- Farinetti in 2013
- Born: Natale Oscar Farinetti; 24 September 1954 (age 72); Alba, Italy
- Culinary career
- Cooking style: Italian

Natale Oscar Farinetti (Italian pronunciation: [ˈɔskar fariˈnetti]; born 24 September 1954), is an Italian businessman and investor. Farinetti was the owner of the high-end Italian food mall chain Eataly and founder of the consumer electronics chain UniEuro.

== Personal life and career ==
Natale Oscar Farinetti was born in Alba, Piedmont. His father was a partisan and deputy mayor of Alba Paolo Farinetti. After attending the liceo classico Govone in Alba, he started studying business in Turin in 1972, but dropped out from college in 1976.

His father Paolo founded a small local supermarket in 1967 and named it UniEuro; a few years later Oscar became actively involved in the business. He was appointed board member in 1978, and then CEO & Chairman until 2003. The same year he decided to sell UniEuro to Dixons Retail for £230m.

In 2004 he founded the high-end Italian supermarket Eataly. The New York Times has described it as a "megastore" that "combines elements of a bustling European open market, a Whole-Foods-style supermarket, a high-end food court and a New Age learning center." The company is based in Monticello d'Alba, Cuneo, Italy and currently controls 28 stores in 7 different countries (United States, United Kingdom, Canada, Japan, UAE, Italy, Turkey and Brazil).

On 18 March 2014, Eataly opened its big 5,000-square-meter store in Piazza XXV Aprile in Milan. In November 2016, Eataly opened in Copenhagen. On 13 November 2019, Eataly opened a 50,000-square-foot store in Toronto, Canada in the Manulife Centre on Bloor Street.

== Media coverage ==
Farinetti's disruptive model has received significant media attention. His methods have been covered by publications including Forbes, The New York Times, The Atlantic and the Chicago Tribune.
