= Gramercy Tavern =

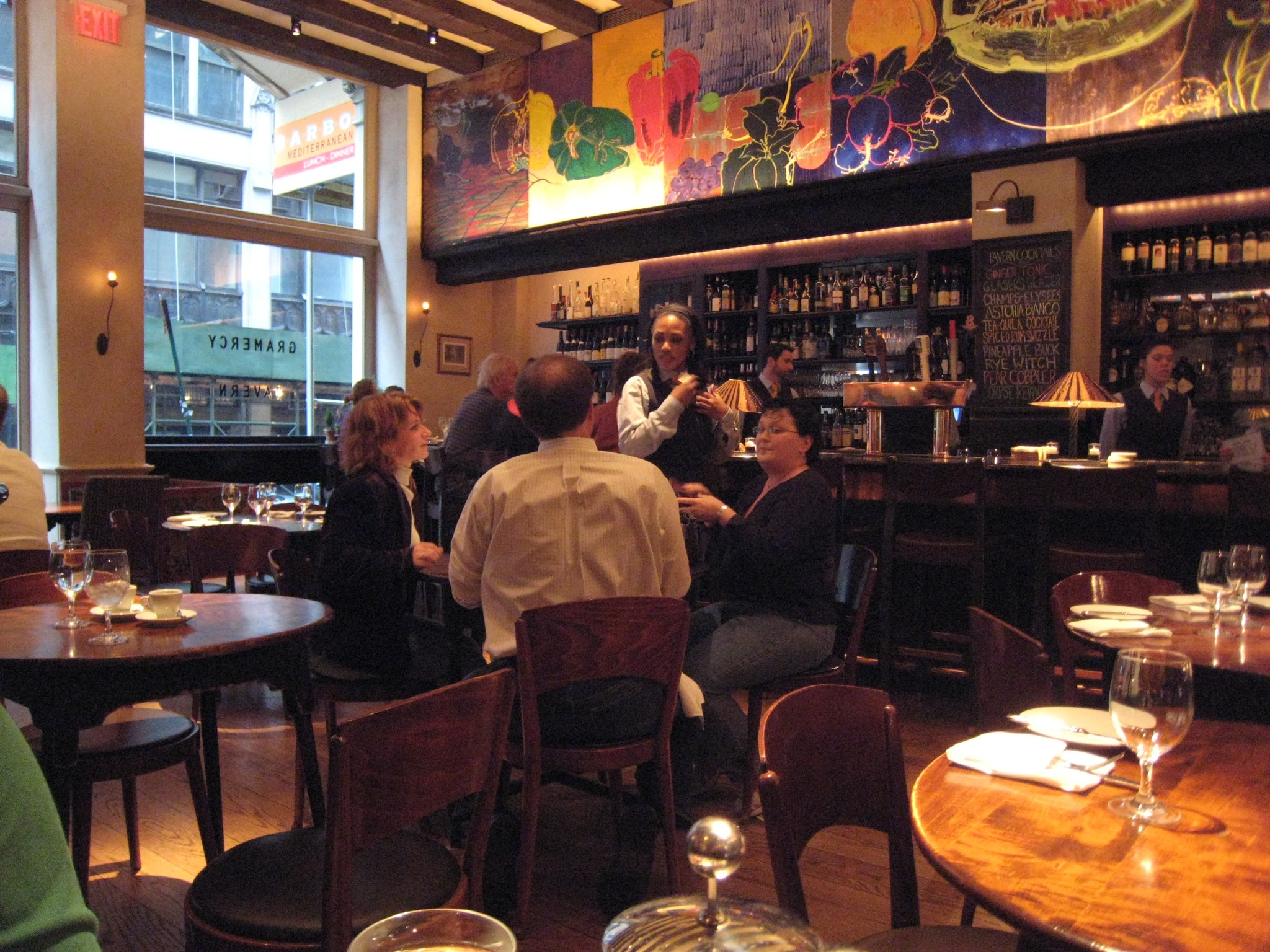
- Interactive map of Gramercy Tavern

Restaurant information
- Established: July 1994
- Owners: Danny Meyer, Michael Anthony, Kevin Mahan
- Chef: Michael Anthony
- Food type: New American
- Rating: (Michelin Guide)
- Location: 42 East 20th Street (between Broadway and Park Avenue S.), in the Flatiron District in Manhattan, New York City, New York, 10003, United States
- Coordinates: 40.738557°N 73.9885°W
- Website: www.gramercytavern.com

Gramercy Tavern is a New American restaurant located at 42 East 20th Street (between Broadway and Park Avenue S.), in the Flatiron District in Manhattan, New York City.

It is owned by Danny Meyer (originally co-founded by Meyer and Chef Tom Colicchio), along with Chef/Partner Michael Anthony. The Executive Pastry Chef is Karen Demasco. The General Manager is Asher Russem. The restaurant opened in July 1994.

== Restaurant ==
The restaurant was designed by New York-based architecture firm Bentel & Bentel Architects. This was the firm's first foray into hospitality design. The restaurant's neo-Colonial decor is rustic. The restaurant can seat 130 people, the bar can accommodate 60 people, and a private dining room can seat 12–22 people.

== Reviews and accolades ==
In 2003, 2005, 2006, 2007, 2010, 2011, and 2015, voters in the Zagats Survey voted it the most popular restaurant in New York City. In 2007, the New York Times gave it three stars.

In 2013, Zagat gave it a food rating of 28, referring to it as “About as perfect as a restaurant can get”. It also rated it Number 1 in New York City for "Dining at the Bar," and the second most popular restaurant in New York City.

Gramercy Tavern was awarded One Star by the Michelin Guide.

The restaurant was named "Outstanding Restaurant of 2008" from the James Beard Foundation.

Wine Spectator awarded Best Of Award of Excellence in 2009, 2010, 2011, 2012, and 2013.

Pete Wells placed Gramercy Tavern in eleventh place in his 2023 ranking of the hundred best restaurants in New York City.

== Notable people ==
- Tracy Malechek-Ezekiel

== See also ==
- List of New American restaurants
- List of Michelin-starred restaurants in New York City
