= Tanya Bastianich Manuali =

American businesswoman and author (born 1972)

Tanya Bastianich Manuali (born 1972) is an American restaurateur and writer. She is the daughter of chef Lidia Bastianich, who is of Istrian-Italian descent, and the sister of restaurateur and television personality Joe Bastianich.

== Life and career ==
Tanya Bastianich Manuali was born in Queens, New York in 1972 to parents Lidia and Felix Bastianich. Her visits to Italy as a child sparked a passion for the country's art and culture. She received a B.A. in art history from Georgetown, then studied Italian Renaissance, earning a master's degree from Syracuse University and a doctorate from Oxford University in 2000. She lived and studied in many regions of Italy and taught to American students in Florence.

Manuali is involved in the production of Lidia's public television series as an owner and executive producer of Tavola Productions, and is also active in the family restaurant business. Alongside her mother Lidia, she is co-owner of Lidia's Kansas City. In 2019, Tanya joined her brother Joe Bastianich in owning and operating several other restaurants, including Babbo, Lupa, Pizzeria Mozza, Osteria Mozza and Chi Spacca. In 2021, Tanya and her brother Joe joined forces with Tommy Mazzanti from all'Antico Vinaio, the famed sandwich shop from Florence Italy to open the first US location on 8th Avenue near Times Square. In November 2022, they opened a second all'Antico Vinaio location on Sullivan St. in Greenwich Village. She led the development of the Lidia's Italy website, and related publications as well as merchandise lines of tabletop and cookware. She is a member of Les Dames D'Escoffier (NY Chapter), a philanthropic organization of women leaders in the fields of food, fine beverage and hospitality.

Together with her husband Corrado Manuali, Manuali oversees the production and expansion of the LIDIA'S food line of all natural sauces. She has co-authored several books with her mother, including: "Lidia's a Pot, a Pan and Bowl: Simple Recipes for Perfect Meals", Felidia: Recipes from My Flagship Restaurant, Lidia's Celebrate Like an Italian, Lidia's Mastering the Art of Italian Cuisine, Lidia's Commonsense Italian Cooking, Lidia's Favorite Recipes, Lidia's Italy, Lidia Cooks from the Heart of Italy, and Lidia's Italy in America. In 2010, she co-authored Reflections of the Breast: Breast Cancer in Art Through the Ages, a social-art-historical look at breast cancer in art from ancient Egypt to today. In 2014, she co-authored a book with her brother entitled Healthy Pasta.

She met her husband Corrado in New York; together, they have two children.
