= Eataly =

Chain of large Italian marketplaces

- Alti cibi translates to "high-quality food"
- Type: Food retail
- Industry: Restaurants, Grocery store
- Founder: Oscar Farinetti
- Headquarters: Monticello d'Alba, CN, Piedmont, Italy
- Number of locations: 59 worldwide
- Products: Food, wine
- Revenue: ▲€684 million (2024)
- Net income: ▼€13.4 million (2024)
- Website: www.eataly.com

Eataly is a chain of large Italian food halls comprising a variety of restaurants, food and beverage counters, bakery, retail stores, and a cooking school. Eataly was founded by Oscar Farinetti, an entrepreneur formerly involved in the consumer electronics business, and collaborates with Slow Food.

== Origin ==
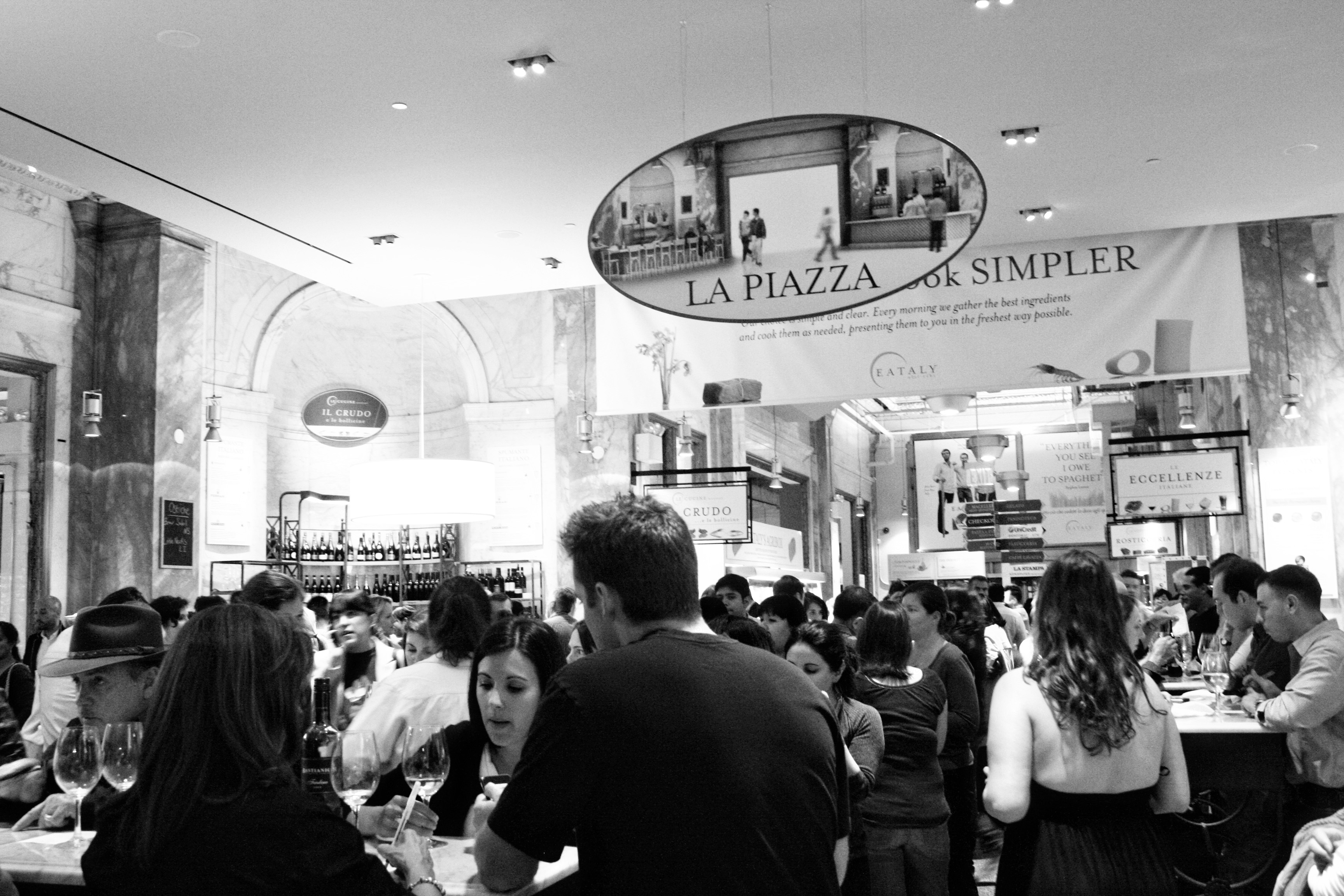
The first of three Eataly branches in New York City, seen in September 2010

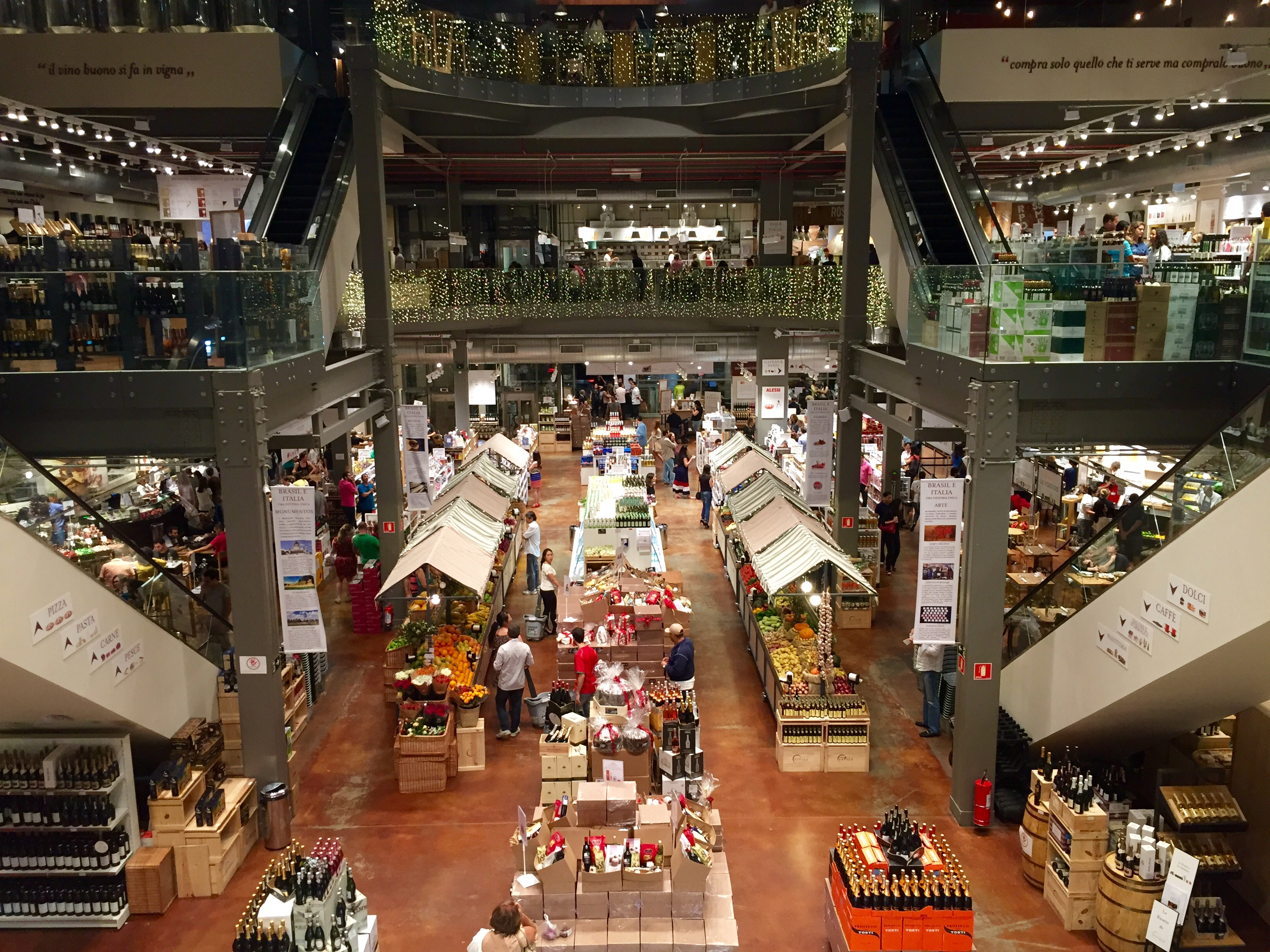
Eataly in São Paulo, Brazil, now closed

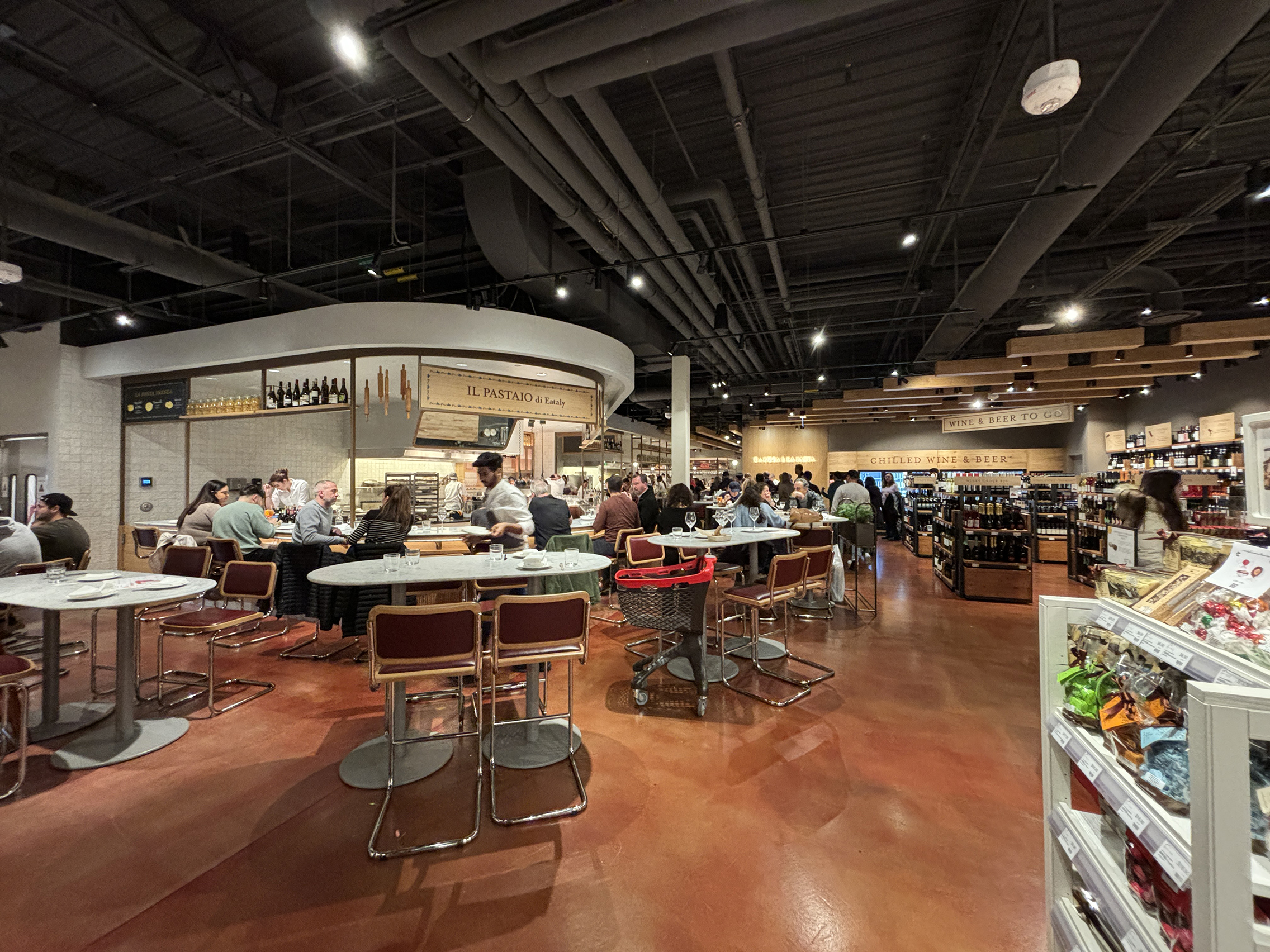
Eataly in Sherway Gardens, Toronto, Canada

In January 2007, Italian businessman Oscar Farinetti opened the first location of Eataly, converting a closed vermouth factory in the Lingotto district of Turin. Easily accessible via the Lingotto metro station, the establishment has been described by The New York Times as a "megastore" that "combines elements of a bustling European open market, a Whole-Foods-style supermarket, a high-end food court and a New Age learning center." Farinetti planned early on that additional stores would open elsewhere in Italy and in New York City with help of investor chef Mario Batali.

== History ==
The first Eataly location in Manhattan was established in the Toy Center Building near Madison Square Park. It is over 50,000 square feet (4,600 m^{2}) in size, and opened with a large amount of press coverage on August 31, 2010. Mayor Michael Bloomberg and Eataly investor chef Mario Batali attended the opening, praising Eataly for creating 300 new jobs. Two weeks after opening, there were still lines extending down Fifth Avenue to get into the store. The New York Eataly had originally been planned for a smaller space near Rockefeller Center.

The chain has additional locations in Italy and a few in Tokyo. In 2012, Eataly opened its largest megastore, in Rome in the abandoned Air Terminal building near Ostiense Station. There is an Eataly at Rome's Fiumicino airport, and in the Porto Antico area in Genoa.

In January 2013, Eataly announced a partnership with MSC Cruises to open two restaurants on MSC Preziosa. Eataly was also added to MSC Divina.

On December 2, 2013, Eataly opened a new location at 43 E. Ohio St. in Chicago, on a 63,000-square-foot (5,900 m^{2}) retail space, making it the largest Eataly in the US. The cost of the Chicago venture is estimated at $20 million. On March 18, 2014, Eataly opened its big 5,000-square-metre (54,000 sq ft) store in Piazza XXV Aprile in Milan.

The founder Oscar Farinetti received the America Award of the Italy-USA Foundation in 2013. On December 16, 2014, Eataly opened the first store at Zorlu Center in Istanbul. On May 19, 2015, Eataly opened its first store in the southern hemisphere in São Paulo. On November 26, 2015, Eataly opened in Munich, making it the first location in Germany.

2016 saw Andrea Guerra become CEO of Eataly. Guerra had previously served as the CEO of eyewear giant Luxottica from 2004 to 2014.

In June 2016, it was announced that an Eataly location would open in 2018 at the Park MGM casino in Las Vegas (formerly the Monte Carlo). Eataly would fill approximately 40,000 square feet (3,700 m^{2}) on the southern edge of the resort and The Park-facing side would become the main pedestrian entrance into the Park MGM casino.

In July 2016, Eataly announced a Downtown Manhattan location at the World Trade Center.

In November 2016, a 45,000-square-foot (4,200 m^{2}) Eataly location opened in the Boston Prudential Center, replacing an existing food court after extensive renovations.

In October 2017, Eataly Century City location opened at the newly remodeled $1-billion Westfield Century City Mall in Los Angeles County. Covering 67,000 square feet (6,200 m^{2}), Eataly LA surpassed Eataly Chicago to become the largest Eataly in the US.

On February 17, 2018, Eataly opened its 40th location in Stockholm, Sweden. The operation occupies 32,300 square feet (3,000 m^{2}) in a former movie theater in the heart of Stockholm's shopping district.

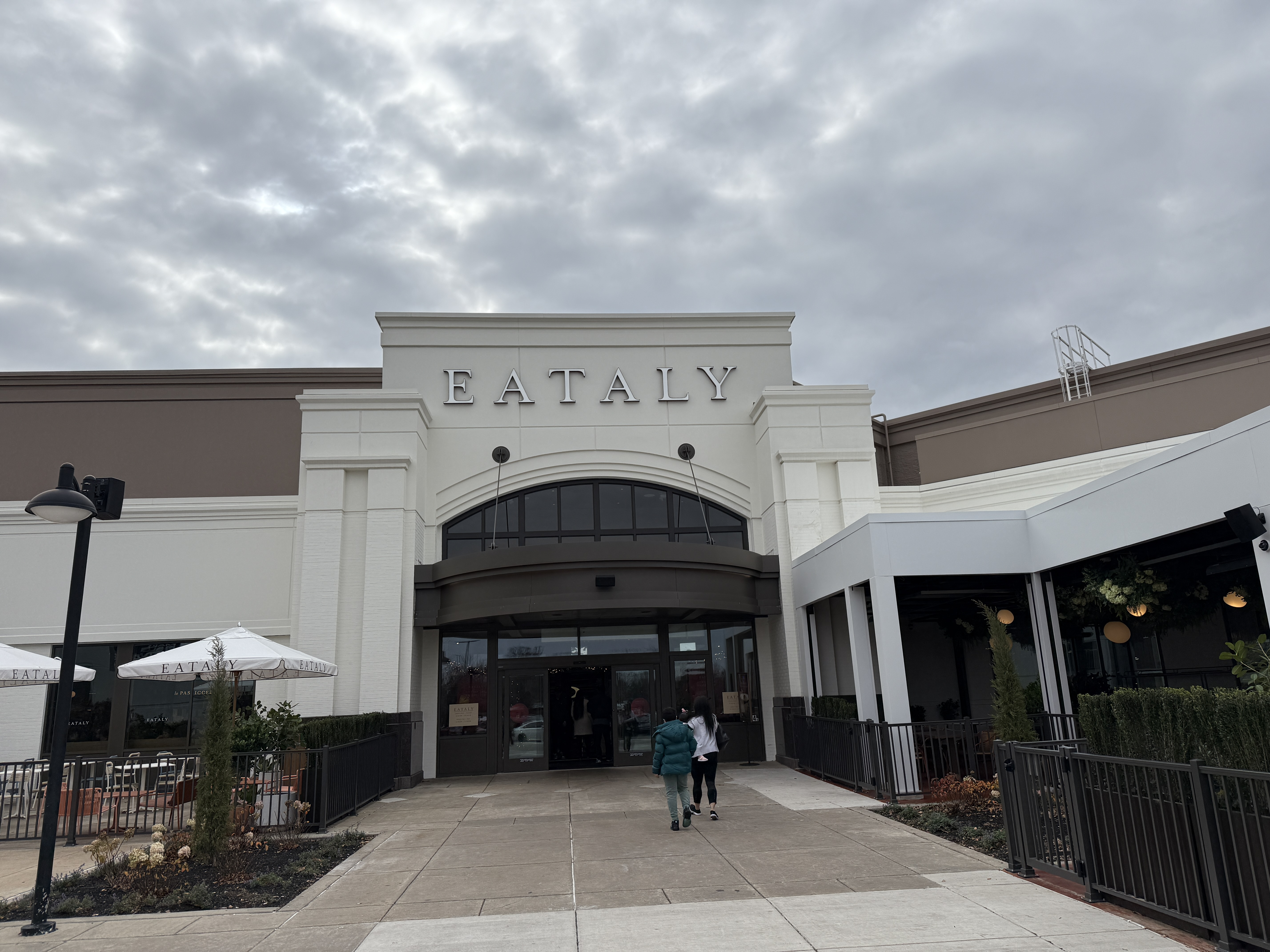
Eataly at the King of Prussia Mall in King of Prussia, Pennsylvania

In April 2019, Eataly opened its first location in Paris, France. It is located in the center of the French capital in the Marais neighborhood, between the Place des Émeutes-de-Stonewall (Stonewall Riots Square) and the rue Sainte-Croix-de-la-Bretonnerie, in Le Marais (4th arrondissement).

The autumn of 2019 saw Guerra depart Eataly for an executive leadership position at LVMH. Guerra's replacement was Nicola Farinetti, son of founder Oscar Farinetti.

On November 13, 2019, Eataly opened a 50,000-square-foot (4,600 m^{2}) store in Toronto, Canada, in the Manulife Centre on Bloor Street.

On December 9, 2020, Eataly opened a 40,000-square-foot (3,700 m^{2}) store in Dallas, Texas, at NorthPark Center.

Eataly announced the dissolution of its franchise in Moscow due to the Russian military invasion of Ukraine on 30 March 2022.

In September 2022, the UK investment firm Investindustrial VII LP became Eataly's owner by acquiring a majority 52% of its shares for 200 million euros.

On November 2, 2023, Eataly opened its second Toronto location at Sherway Gardens shopping mall with 25,000 square feet (2,300 m^{2}) of space. On May 30, 2024, it opened its third Toronto location at Shops at Don Mills with 9,800 square feet (910 m^{2}). A fourth Toronto location opened on November 25, 2025, at the Eaton Centre, spanning 25,000 square feet (2,300 m^{2}) across two levels. It is also the only city with at least four locations after New York City.

Eataly severed ties with its São Paulo store in December 2023. The franchise holder continued to operate the store without permission until August 2025 when a court order closed the branch.

== Name ==
The name Eataly was coined by Celestino Ciocca, a brand strategy consultant who has worked for Texas Instruments and Ernst & Young. He first registered Eataly as a domain name on February 23, 2000, and as a trademark in June 2000. Ciocca sold (by his family company) all his rights to the name to Natale Farinetti on February 3, 2004, by public deed repertorio n° 96538 – raccolta n° 11510.

== Animal welfare ==
In 2022, Eataly signed the European Chicken Commitment (ECC), thereby committing to implement several improvements in chicken living standards and humane slaughter practices by 2026.

== Controversy ==
Mario Batali, previously a minority owner and founder of Eataly, is now no longer attached to the company following sexual misconduct allegations against him. Eataly pulled all products bearing his likeness two days after the allegations surfaced in 2017.

== Branded store locations ==
Americas

- Canada: 4
- United States: 12

Asia-Pacific

- Japan: 5
- Israel: 1
- Kuwait: 1
- Lebanon: 1
- Qatar: 2
- Saudi Arabia: 1
- South Korea: 3
- United Arab Emirates: 5

Europe

- Germany: 1
- France: 1
- UK: 1
- Italy: 13
- Sweden: 1
- Turkey: 1

The Eataly store in Las Vegas' Park MGM is owned by MGM Resorts International.

Other planned stores include a Brussels location.
