= List of Italian chefs =

This is a list of Italian chefs:

== A ==
- Andrea Accordi
- Massimiliano Alajmo
- Andrea Apuzzo

== B ==
- Lidia Bastianich
- Bruno Barbieri
- Benny the Chef (Benedetto D'Epiro)
- Ettore Boiardi
- Massimo Bottura

== C ==
- Antonino Cannavacciuolo
- Massimo Capra
- Caesar Cardini
- Antonio Carluccio
- Pasquale Carpino
- Cesare Casella
- Gianfranco Chiarini
- Gennaro Contaldo
- Salvatore Cuomo
- Gennaro Contaldo

== D ==
- Gino D'Acampo
- Dino D’Avanzo
- Giada De Laurentiis
- Donato De Santis
- Attilio di Fabrizio
- Anna Del Conte

== E ==
- Raffaele Esposito

== F ==
- Mario Frittoli

== L ==
- Antonio Latini
- Giorgio Locatelli
- Kevin LaFemina

== M ==
- Gualtiero Marchesi
- Martino da Como
- Filippo Mazzei

== P ==
- Renato Piccolotto
- Marco Pierre White

== R ==
- Giovanni Rana
- Gian Franco Romagnoli

== S ==
- Bartolomeo Scappi

== W ==
- Heinz Winkler

== Z ==
- Aldo Zilli

== See also ==
- Italian cuisine
- List of Italian dishes
- List of Italian restaurants
