= List of people from Portsmouth =

Notable people from Portsmouth in Hampshire, England, include:

- Sir John Armitt, Chairman of the London 2012 Olympic Delivery Authority, grew up in Portsmouth and attended also Portsmouth Northern Grammar School. He graduated in civil engineering from the Portsmouth College of Technology in 1966.
- Hertha Ayrton, scientist and Suffragette who was described as one of Portsmouth's "least known and celebrated figures", was born in Portsea.
- Sir Francis Austen, brother of Jane Austen, briefly lived in the area after graduating from Portsmouth Naval Academy
- Actress Emma Barton
- Bollywood actress Geeta Basra, was born and raised in Portsmouth
- Sir Walter Besant, a novelist and historian was born in Portsmouth, writing one novel set exclusively in the town, By Celia's Arbour, A Tale of Portsmouth Town
- Isambard Kingdom Brunel, famed engineer of the Industrial Revolution, was born in Portsmouth
- Marc Isambard Brunel, worked for the Royal Navy and invented the world's first production line to mass manufacture pulley blocks for the rigging in Royal Navy vessels as well as designing the tunnelling shield used to dig the Thames Tunnel, the first tunnel under a navigable river in the world.
- James Callaghan, British prime minister from 1976 to 1979, was born and raised in Portsmouth.
- Frederick Chatterton (1812–1886), English harpist
- Mel Croucher founder of the UK videogames industry, born in Portsmouth 19 November 1948.
- Sir Barry Cunliffe, one of Britain's leading archaeologists and Emeritus Professor of European Archaeology at Oxford University, grew up in Portsmouth and attended Portsmouth Northern Grammar School.
- Ben Falinski, singer in rock band Ivyrise was born and raised in Portsmouth.
- Ian Darke, football and boxing commentator currently working for BT Sport and previously one of Sky Sports' "Big Four" football commentators, was born in the city.
- Charles Dickens, known for such works as A Christmas Carol, Great Expectations, Oliver Twist and A Tale of Two Cities, was born in Portsmouth
- Harry Digweed, footballer
- Arthur Conan Doyle, author of the Sherlock Holmes stories, practised as doctor in the city and played in goal for Portsmouth Association Football club, an amateur team not to be confused with the later professional Portsmouth Football Club
- Actress Nicola Duffett, best known for her role on Family Affairs
- Helen Duncan, last person to be imprisoned under the 1735 Witchcraft Act in the UK was arrested in Portsmouth.
- Michael East, Commonwealth Games gold medal-winning athlete
- Matt Edmondson, Radio 1 and Channel 4 presenter,
- Jill Ellis, two time FIFA World Cup winning coach of the United States Women’s National Soccer Team.
- Gerald Flood (21 April 1927 – 12 April 1989), actor of stage and television, was born in Portsmouth.
- Paul Flowers, disgraced chairman of the Co-operative Bank and Labour politician
- Douglas Morey Ford, lawyer and author.
- Fantasy author Neil Gaiman grew up in nearby Purbrook and the Portsmouth suburb of Southsea, and in 2013 had a Southsea road named after his novel The Ocean At The End Of The Lane.
- Joseph Garrett (YouTuber)
- Peter Gautrey, British diplomat
- Stephen Goldring (born 1932), first-class cricketer and British Army officer
- Rob Hayles, cyclist and Olympic Games medal winner
- DJ Hixxy,
- William Brodleck Herms, American entomologist and university professor
- Journalist and author Christopher Hitchens, was born in the city
- Roger Hodgson of Supertramp, progressive rock band Gentle Giant,
- Lancelot Hogben FRS (1895–1975), experimental zoologist and medical statistician
- Amanda Holden, television presenter and actress
- Brian Howe, vocalist of Bad Company
- Graham Hurley, whose Joe Faraday crime novels are based in the city.
- Joe Jackson, musician and singer–songwriter grew up in the city
- Audrey Jeans, comedienne and singer.
- Mick Jones, founder of Foreigner, was born in Portsmouth
- Paul Jones (born Paul Pond, 24 February 1942, in Portsmouth), singer, actor, harmonica player, radio personality and television presenter.
- Dillie Keane, songwriter, entertainer, founder of the comedy trio Fascinating Aïda, was born in Southsea
- Jim Al-Khalili is a British theoretical physicist, author and broadcaster. He lives in Southsea in Portsmouth with his wife Julie.
- Rudyard Kipling, spent a miserable childhood boarding in Southsea, but prevailed to become a Nobel-winning poet and author of the Jungle Book
- Amanda Lamb, TV Presenter and former model
- Palaeographer Sir Frederic Madden, born in the city in 1801.
- John Madden, Director of "Shakespeare in Love", "The best exotic Marigold hotel" series,"Mrs Brown" "The Debt" and others, born 1949, in Southsea
- George Meredith, grew up in Portsmouth High Street.
- Michelle Magorian (born 6 November 1947) is an English author of children's books. She is best known for her first novel, Goodnight Mister Tom.
- Alexander St. Lo Malet (1845–1922), first-class cricketer and British Army soldier
- Stephen Marcus, actor, born in Portsmouth
- Ant Middleton, presenter of SAS Who Dares Wins, former SBS, current television presenter and author was born in Portsmouth
- Aubrey Morris (born Aubrey Jack Steinberg, in Portsmouth; 1 June 1926– 5 July 2015), actor
- Wolfe Morris (born Wolfe Steinberg, in Portsmouth, 5 January 1925 – 21 July 1996), actor
- Mason Mount, footballer who plays for Premier League club Manchester United, was born in Portsmouth.
- Tony Oakey, former British light-heavyweight boxing champion
- Roland Orzabal, from Tears For Fears grew up in the area.
- Alison Owen, film director, was born in the city.
- Alan Pascoe, Olympic medallist, born in the city
- John Pounds, founder of the ragged school, which provided free education to working class children, lived in Portsmouth and set up the country's first ragged school in the city.
- RemedySounds (Joshua Ross Clark), English dubstep/acoustic musician
- Eric Rimmington (1926–2024), painter of still lifes, landscapes and murals.
- Sir Alec Rose, single-handed yachtsman
- Peter Sellers, comedian, actor, and performer was born in Southsea
- Katy Sexton, former world champion swimmer who won gold in the 200 metres (660 ft) backstroke at the 2003 World Aquatics Championships in Barcelona
- Arnold Schwarzenegger, lived and trained in Portsmouth for a short time.
- Nevil Shute, moved to Portsmouth in 1934 when he relocated his aircraft company to the city; his former home stands in the Eastney end of the island of Portsea
- Anthony Thackara (1917–2007), first-class cricketer and Royal Navy officer
- William Tucker, trader in human heads, and New Zealand's first art dealer was also born in Portsmouth.
- John Vernon (1922–1994), first-class cricketer and Royal Navy sailor
- James Ward-Prowse, footballer who plays for Premier League club West Ham United, was born in Portsmouth.
- H. G. Wells, author of The War of the Worlds and The Time Machine, lived in Pompey during the 1880s
- Kim Woodburn, of How Clean is Your House?.
- Dame Frances Amelia Yates, British historian was born in Victoria Road in Southsea.
- Sasha Howe-Haysom, British podcaster, lyricist and football fanatic was born in Portsmouth in 2003, can be found in Podcasts ran by ChampionshipTalk & other EFL channels. Music is currently prepared via an unknown platform. Sasha Howe-Haysom has been to over 400 games for Portsmouth FC across 13 years and has featured on Portsmouth News on occasions for his involvement in "Gaffer for a day".
