= Allegro =

Allegro may refer to:

== Common meanings ==
- Allegro (music), a tempo marking that indicates to playing quickly and brightly (from Italian meaning cheerful)
- Allegro (ballet), brisk and lively movement

== Artistic works ==
- L'Allegro (1645), a poem by John Milton
- Allegro (Satie), an 1884 piano piece by Erik Satie
- "Allegro", any of several musical works in Nannerl Notenbuch by Wolfgang Amadeus Mozart
- "Allegro", a composition by Bear McCreary in Music of Battlestar Galactica
- Allegro (film), a 2005 Danish film by Christoffer Boe
- Allegro (musical), a 1947 musical by Rodgers and Hammerstein

== Businesses and brands ==
- Allegro (website), a Polish e-commerce platform
- Allegro (restaurant), a luxury restaurant in Prague
- Allegro (train), a former passenger train service between Helsinki and Saint Petersburg
- Allegro Coffee Co., a beverage company acquired by Whole Foods Market
- Allegro (Consumer Goods), a division of Conair Corporation
- Allegro DVT, a French video codec company
- Allegro Microsystems, a semiconductor company
- Austin Allegro, a car once manufactured by British Leyland
- Mazda Allegro, a car manufactured in South America as a version of Mazda Familia
- Líneas Aéreas Allegro, a Mexican airline

== Science and technology ==
- Allegro gravitational-wave detector
- ALLEGRO, European experimental gas-cooled fast reactor
- Allegro (software library), a multi-platform software library for video and audio application development
- Allegro 8 (software), risk management software by Allegro Development Corporation
- Allegro Common Lisp, a variant of the Common Lisp programming language
- Allegro Platform, an ECAD tool by Cadence Design Systems
- Allegro musical notation, a text-based score representation used by Audacity

== Other uses ==
- Allegro (typeface), a typeface designed in 1936
- Allegro speech, a relatively fast manner of speaking
- John Marco Allegro, Dead Sea Scrolls scholar

== See also ==
- Allegra (disambiguation)
