= Jersey Live =

Music festival n Jersey, Channel Islands

Jersey Live Festival
- Genre: Rock, Alternative rock, Indie rock, Dance.
- Dates: First weekend following the August Bank Holiday (2 days)
- Locations: Jersey, Channel Islands
- Years active: 2004–2016
- Founders: Warren Le Sueur
- Website: http://www.jerseylive.org.uk

Jersey Live Music Festival (alternatively Jersey Live) was a music festival held annually at The Royal Jersey Showground in the parish of Trinity, Jersey between 2004 and 2016.

== Overview ==
Jersey Live started out as a 4,000-capacity, one-day event in 2004 with music across two stages. The festival took place over two days and grew in size each year, with six stages featuring live music, DJs and as of 2013, comedy and spoken word. Jersey Live had capacity for an attendance of 10,000 people per day, selling out at that capacity for the first time in 2010.

The festival was sponsored each year by local telecommunications company JT, who host the JT Stage at the festival. The other five stages are the Main Stage, Dance Stage, Family Field Stage, Hospitality Stage and Full Flow Locale DJ Tent. The festival had featured performances from a number of major stars of indie and dance music since 2004 including Paul Weller, The Prodigy, Kasabian, Dizzee Rascal and Chase & Status. The festival's line up was typically composed of established mainstream indie and dance acts on the Main and Dance stages, with up-and-coming artists of a wide range of genres spanning folk, hip-hop, punk, ska and reggae, as well as a number of local acts, making up the lineup elsewhere at the festival. Amongst the artists to have performed at Jersey Live in the early stages of their careers before going on to become considerably higher in profile, are Foals, Tinie Tempah, Jake Bugg, Ed Sheeran and Razorlight.

== Stages ==
Since 2009, the festival typically had the following stages;

- Main stage
- Dance stage
- Family Field stage
- Hospitality stage – entry restricted to specific ticket types.
- JT stage
- Fullflow Locale DJ stage

== 2014 ==
A festival was held on the weekend of 30 August and 31 August 2014.

	Main Stage	Dance Stage	JT Stage in Par 4	Hospitality Stage	Fullflow Stage
Saturday 30 August	Ellie Goulding; John Newman; Earth, Wind & Fire experience feat. Al McKay; Newton Faulkner; The Graveltones; Nina Nesbitt; Luke Friend; Frankie Davies	Duke Dumont; Eton Messy; Le Youth; Thomas Gandey; Simon Gasston; Sasha Le Monnier	The Graveltones; David Rodigan MBE; The Little Big Band; Roald Dahl Storytellers; Mr Bloom	David Rodigan MBE; The Doors Alive; Clashmar; Frankie Davies; Mo'Matic DJ Set; Laura Butlin	Steve Ferbrache; Carl Scott; Jon Peacock; Ross Hunter; Craig Alder; Griff; Tony Safe; Rory Neil; Del McKeown; Paul Shoer; Colin Moore; Double P; Ben Newman
Sunday 31 August	Ben Howard; Bombay Bicycle Club; Klaxons; The Selecter; Catfish & The Bottlemen; Lucy Rose; Billy Rowan; Diversity	Mark Knight; Catz 'N' Dogz; Redlight; Pete de Momme; Stuart King; Ben Rocksteady	Dreadzone; Billy Rowan; Sergeant Pipon; Shlomo beatbox Adventure for Kids; Anna the Hulagan	Molotov Jukebox; The Selecter; Lucy Rose acoustic; Mo'Matic DJ Set; Craig Alder DJ Set	Schema; Terminal State; Spim; Simon Gasston; Ben Newman; Ryan Herve; Hannah Jacques; John O'Connell; Andy Manson; Colin Moore & Double P

== 2013 ==
A festival was held on the weekend of 31 August and 1 September 2013. For the first time, the festival was granted permission to provide a campsite. However, the provision of camping was cancelled by the festival organisers due to a lack of demand.

	Main Stage	Dance Stage	JT Stage	Folklore Stage	Hospitality Stage
Saturday 31 August	Fatboy Slim (Headline); Chic featuring Nile Rodgers; The Cribs; The 1975; Dinosaur Jr.; Nina Nesbitt; Clean Bandit; Teddy	Netsky and Dynamite MC; Camo & Krooked; Doctor P; Skip & Die; Shlomo; Schema; Fuzzbox Inc.	Clean Bandit; Public Service Broadcasting; Brave Yesterday; Pirate Video Company; Harlequin Knights	Dry the River; King Kahn & The Shrines; Lewis Watson; Simon Evans; Howard Marks; Badlabecques; Count Sizzle	Craig Charles; John Cooper Clarke; The Recks; Jordan Burrows; Laura Butlin
Sunday 1 September	Example; Bastille; The Enemy; Tom Odell; Deap Vally; Gabrielle Aplin; Kanka	Pete Tong; Dusky; Waze & Odyssey; Hot Since 82; Russ Chimes	Lewis Watson; Wolf People; Teddy; Bob Baker; Alfresco Bandits	The Neville Staple Band; Kanka; Skip & Die; John Cooper Clarke; Sergeant Pipon; Count Sizzle	Billy Rowan (The Undercover Hippy); Neville Staple; Howard Marks; Simon Evans; Monty Taft

== 2012 ==
The festival was held on 1 and 2 September 2012.

The table below lists the acts that performed.

In May, Trinity's Constable John Gallichan declared that festival goers below the age of 16 would have to be accompanied by an adult, at the 2012 event, as measure to reduce underage drinking.

	Main Stage	Dance Stage	JT Stage	SoBe Stage	Hospitality Stage
Sat 1 September	Chase & Status (Headline); Brobots (featuring The Beatles); Professor Green; Rizzle Kicks; Maverick Sabre; Devlin; Last Dinosaurs; Janice Graham Band (Manchester); Monty Taft	James Zabiela; Hervé; Jaguar Skills; Jaymo & Andy George; LOGO (signed to Kitsuné); Thomas Gandey; Andrew Wicks	Last Dinosaurs; Nina Nesbitt (singer/songwriter); Pirate Video Company (band); Any Given Sunday; The Gaa Gaas	Friends; Bwani Junction (UK band); The Valentines; The Bloody Battle; The Centeniers; U.G. & B-Eazy; BBC Jersey Live Show	Craig Charles; Smoove & Turrell
Sun 2 September	Noel Gallagher's High Flying Birds (Headline); Primal Scream; The Stranglers; Alex Clare; Jake Bugg; Friends; The Valentines	DJ Hype & IC3; Feed Me (Jon Gooch); Delta Heavy (Sasha & John Digweed); B.Traits; Fuzz Box Inc.; Schema	The Janice Graham Band; Bwani Junction; Brave Yesterday; Ed & BJ; Monty Taft	Jake Bugg; Nina Nesbitt; The Recks; Badlabecques; Rosie Barrett	David Holmes

== 2011 ==
The 2011 festival was held on 3 and 4 September 2011, and sponsored by Jersey Telecom.

The attendance was 10,000 per day.

There were disputed reports of excessive drinking by under-age people.

	Main Stage	Dance Arena	Sobe Stage	Tease Stage	Hospitality Stage
Sat 3 September	Madness (Headline); The Streets; Cage The Elephant; Katy B; Amadou & Mariam; Wretch 32; Ed Sheeran; Benjamin Francis Leftwich; The Little Big Band; Brobots	Zane Lowe; Annie Mac; Danny Byrd & MC Dynamite; Breakage; Toddla T & MC Serocee	Jamie Woon; Summer Camp; King Charles		Craig Charles (DJ Set); Benjamin Francis Leftwich
Sun 4 September	Plan B (Headline); The Ting Tings; Feeder; The Rapture; Santigold; The Beat; Cabadzi; The Bloody Battle	Mr. Oizo; Sasha; Alex Metric; Schema	Black Devil Disco Club; Tribes; Dry The River; The Lovely Eggs		Huw Stephens (DJ Set); Ed Sheeran; King Charles; Lloyd Yates

== 2010 ==
Jersey Telecom renewed their sponsorship agreement of Jersey Live for a fifth year.

Main Stage hosted by Mani (Stone Roses/Primal Scream).

	Main Stage	Dance Arena	Hospitality Stage	Les Inrocks Magic Stage	Wild West Tease Stage
Sat 4 September	Brobots (Heroes of the Century); Groove Armada (Headline); Biffy Clyro; Chase & Status; The View; Professor Green; Fenech-Soler; Darwin Deez; We Have Band; Bones	Caspa & MC Rod Azlan (Headline); DJ Switch; Teenage Bad Girl; Rico Tubbs; DJ Rafik; Schema; Brobots; Ryan Herve; Sasha Le Monnier; Tharindu Elkin	Count Sizzle; Peggy Sue; Cabadzi; Nick Harper; Kevin Pallot; Nathalie Nihai; Isaac Evans	Jamaica (Headline); Here We Go Magic; Rubin Steiner; We Are Enfant Terrible; Muchuu; The Valentines; Pirate Video Company	The Hats; Bones; The Valentines; Dinosaur Collective; Quick & The Dead; Last of the Light Brigade; The Wizz; The Midnight Expresso; Lloyd Yates Band; The Centeniers; Benny The Moth; Clockwork Sodomy; Tom Butel
Sun 5 September	Paul Weller (Headline); Kate Nash; Tinie Tempah; The Magic Numbers; Chapel Club; Peggy Sue; Django Django; Last of the Light Brigade	Calvin Harris (Headline); Sub Focus & MC ID; Jaguar Skills; Foamo; Drums of Death; Fuzzbox Inc; DJ Spim; Andy Manson	Count Sizzle; Darwin Deez; Rubin Steiner; We Are Enfant Terrible; Hip Hoperation; Lloyd Yates; Comedy	Fenech-Soler (Headline); We Have Band; Freelance Whales; Django Django; Cabadzi; Gay Army	Sound of Guns; Brave Yesterday; The Bloody Battle; Hold Your Fire!; Lizzard Channel; Little Big Band; Kevin Pallot & The Pinnacles; All in Human Trainwreck; The Mulburys; The Hype; Didgeridoo Bruce

== 2009 ==
Around 9,000 people attended in 2009.

	Positiv Main Stage	Theory Dance Arena	Les Inrocks Stage	VIP Spiegel Tent	The Big Tease Tent
Sat 5 September	Basement Jaxx; Dizzee Rascal; Passion Pit; The Whip; Frank Turner; Golden Silvers; The Antlers; Brave Yesterday; The Dirty Aces; Stanley Forbes	Andy C; London Elektricity; Beardyman; Dan Le Sac; Annie Nightingale; Terminal State; Oneofakind; DJ Spim	Naive New Beaters; Twisted Wheel; The Boxer Rebellion; Fight Like Apes; Cocoon; The Valentines	Craig Charles; Frank Turner; Lloyd Yates; The Midnight Expresso; Kevin Pallot & The Pinnacles; Jersey Bob; Stanley Forbes	Marvel; Black Stats; The Valentines; The Speedways; The Little Big Band; Kevin Pallot & The Pinnacles; Banquet; The Blind Drivers; The Freewheelers; Off Limits
Sun 6 September	The Kooks; Doves; Jack Peñate; Twisted Wheel; The Boxer Rebellion; The Temper Trap; Fight Like Apes; Black Stats; Marvel; Craig Charles (Compere)	2manydjs; Birdy Nam Nam; DJ Yoda; Naive New Beaters; CasioKids; FuzzBox DJs; Carrie Cooper; Suze Rosser	Kap Bambino; Chew Lips; The Antlers; Curry & Coco; Gablé	Emily Loizeau; Gablé; Cocoon; The Valentines; Bruce Carnegie; Oneofakind; Count Sizzle	Brave Yesterday; The Dirty Aces; Celadores; The Centeniers; Lloyd Yates; The Porcupine Effect; Benny The Moth; Laurel Canyon; The Empty 7; Annie Law

== 2008 ==
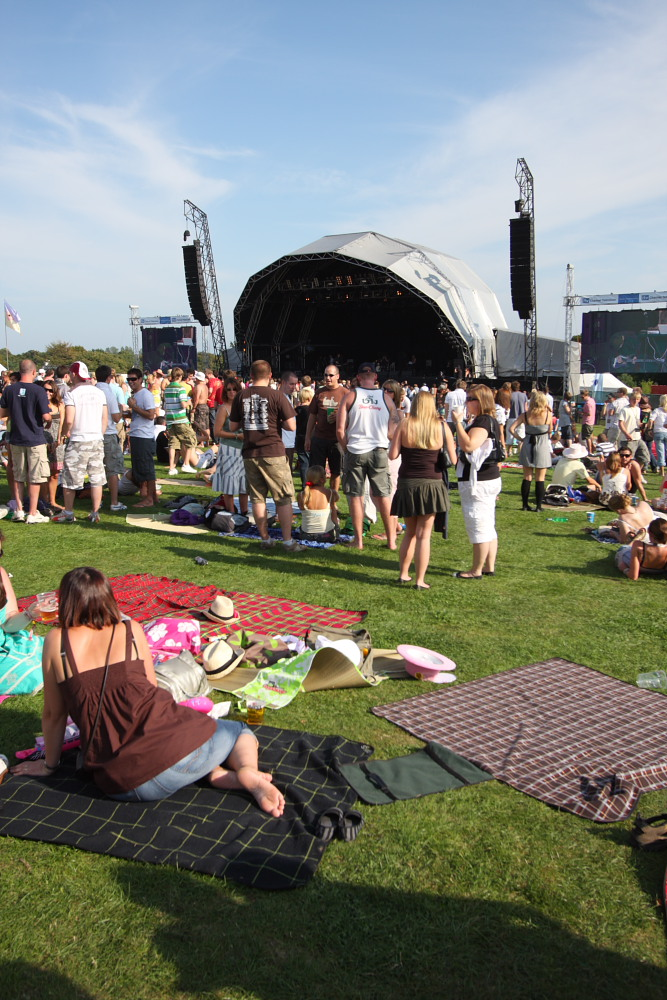
Main stage in 2008.

	Positiv Main Stage	Theory Dance Arena
Sat 30 August	The Zutons; We Are Scientists; Foals; The Courteeners; Blood Red Shoes; These New Puritans; The Author; The Valentines; Black Stats; Gay Army	Scratch Perverts; Krafty Kuts; Atomic Hooligan; Scott Nixon; Colin Moore; DJ Spim; Mark Ronez; Justin De Gruchy; Carl Scott; Stuart King
Sun 31 August	The Prodigy; The Go! Team; The Music; Goose; Crystal Castles; Black Kids; Cage the Elephant; Velofax; Porcupine Effect	Kissy Sell Out; Sebastien Leger; D Ramirez; Caged Baby; Black Grass; Oneofakind; Gaz & Steve; Carrie Cooper (of BBC Jersey); Ritchie SDS

== 2007 ==
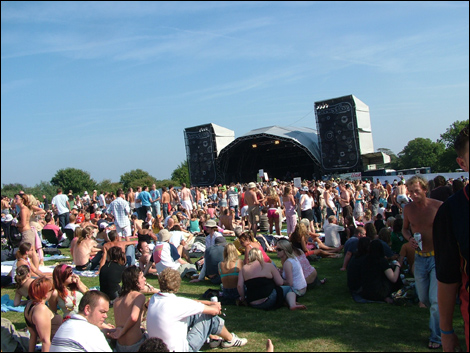
Main stage in 2007.

	Positiv Main Stage	Theory Dance Arena
Sat 1 September	The Fratellis; The Twang; The Enemy; Little Man Tate; Air Traffic; The Teenagers; Does It Offend You, Yeah?; The Veez; Smith 6079; Marvel; Benny The Moth; Melting Pot DJs	Digitalism; Boys Noize; Optimo; Justin Robertson; DJ Netik; Paul Mack; Mikey Ashford; Pete De Momme; Carl Scott
Sun 2 September	Kasabian; Audio Bullys; Super Furry Animals; Pigeon Detectives; Goose; Brakes; The Author; Tramp Sinatra	Steve Lawler; Tim Deluxe; DJ Format; Fergie; Freelance Helraiser; Mckinnon and Campbell; Stuart King; J DeGruchy; Ryan Herve

== 2006 ==
In 2006, 7,500 people attended the festival.

Positiv Main Stage	Theory Dance Arena
Snow Patrol; The Zutons; Editors; Get Cape Wear Cape Fly; Milburn; ¡Forward, Russia!; The On, Offs; The Paddingtons; The Levellers; Sandi Thom; Nick Harper; Velofax; Kudu; The Valentines; The Merge; deNova Blues; Filthy Dukes	James Lavelle; Ivan Smagghe; Erol Alkan; Riton; C2C; Le Sueur and Gasston; McKinnon and Campbell

== 2005 ==
Positiv Main Stage	Theory Dance Arena
Kasabian; The Futureheads; The Bravery; The Ordinary Boys; The Black Velvets; Art Brut; The Valentines; Velofax; Bulletproof; Killian; The OK's; Jackson Moody Band	2 Many Djs; Whitey; The Glimmers; The Mixologists; THEORY Residents

== 2004 ==
Positiv Main Stage	Theory Dance Arena
The Thrills; Razorlight; Delays; The Open; The Subways; Velofax; Wilmor; Repeater; Bothered Face; Benny the Moth and the Erogenous Zones; The Merge	Theory; Hi-Fi Sushi; Rhumba; Pandemic; Ashford & Mack; Terminalstate; O.O.T.W.

== See also ==
- Jersey Folklore Festival
- Music of the Channel Islands
