= St. Lo (disambiguation) =

Saint-Lô is a commune in the Manche department of France.

St. Lo or Saint-Lô may also refer to:

- Laud of Coutances, the bishop after which Saint-Lô was named
- Saint-Lô station
- USS St. Lo
- George St Lo
- Edward St Lo
- Alexander St. Lo Malet
