= Allegro (restaurant) =

- Interactive map of Allegro

Restaurant information
- Head chef: Andrea Accordi
- Rating: Michelin Guide, 2008
- Location: Veleslavínova 2a/1098, Prague, 110 00, Czech Republic
- Coordinates: 50°5′15.5″N 14°24′54.2″E

Allegro was a top restaurant in Four Seasons hotel in Prague, which is now closed. The restaurant served mainly Italian and also Bohemian food. In 2008 it became the first restaurant from the post-communist bloc to obtain the star from the prestigious Michelin Guide. In 2009, 2010 and 2011, Allegro retained its star.

It was the only restaurant in Prague with the accolade, although in 2010 a restaurant in Hungary was awarded the star, ending Allego's claim as the only restaurant from the Eastern Bloc to have the star.

The head chef was Andrea Accordi, who won his second Michelin star at the time Allegro won its first.
