= Branchage =

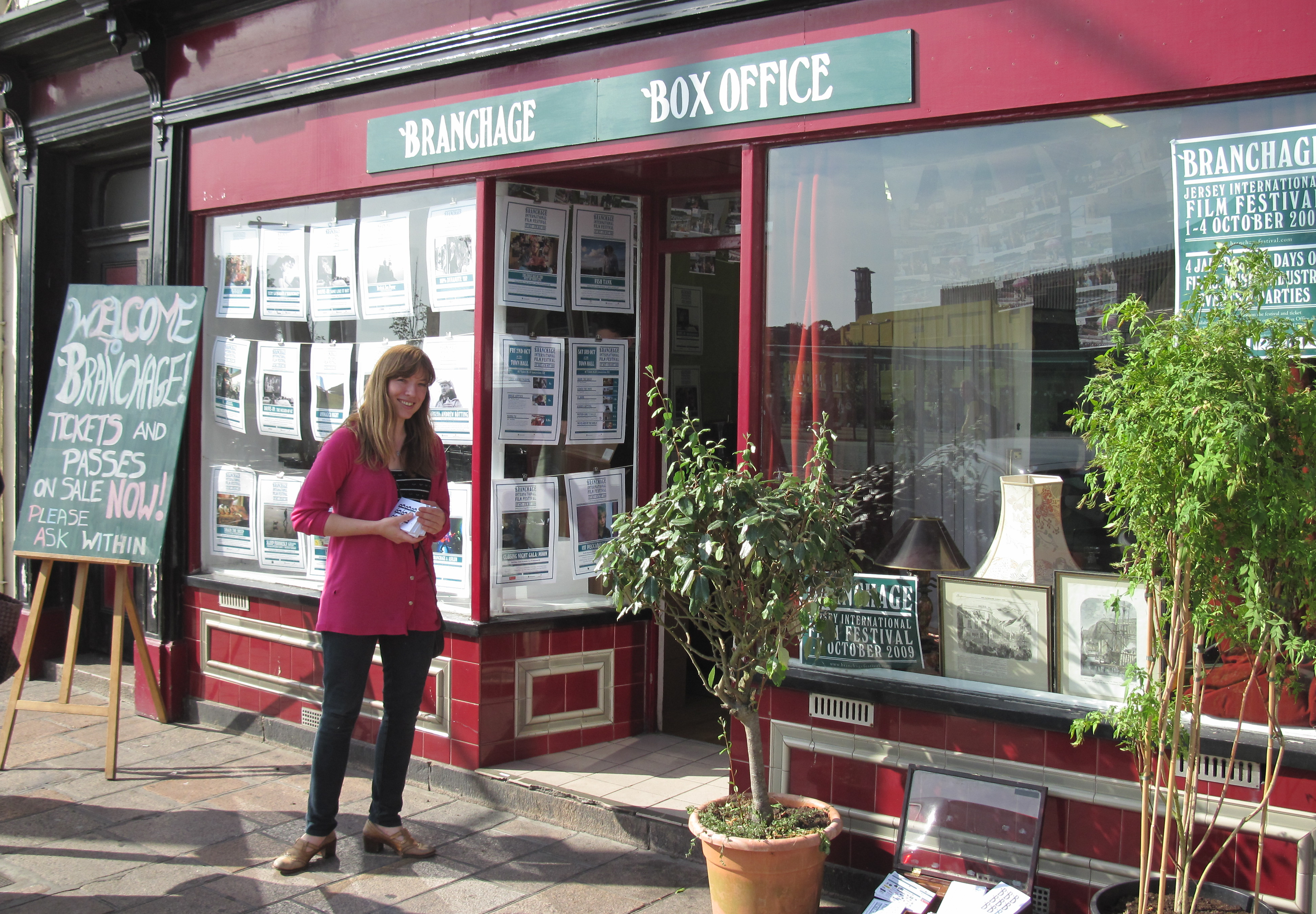
Branchage film festival box office in Saint Helier, 2009

Branchage is a film festival held in the Channel Island of Jersey. The festival was founded in 2008 by filmmaker Xanthe Hamilton to bring film and arts to the island. It is a mix of site-specific film screenings held across the island in churches, castles, barns, and bunkers alongside more conventional arts spaces and cinemas, alongside film and art commissions, live soundtracks to film, short film programmes, industry networking and spectacular themed parties mixing live performance, name DJs and cabaret.

Branchage is a not for profit organisation.

== 2008 Festival ==
The inaugural Festival opened with a screening of the Oscar-winning documentary feature Man on Wire (dir: James Marsh) in the Opera House, followed by a Q&A with producer Simon Chinn; Simon became patron to the Festival in 2009.

The Branchage Spiegeltent was erected in Weighbridge Square, St Helier, for the first time. Saturday night saw the first Bordée de Branchage, a party inspired by burlesque cabaret and circus sideshows, featuring a live performance from Paloma Faith alongside DJ duo The Broken Hearts. Friday night saw a Warp Records themed party with a live set from The Oscillation and DJ set by Broadcast, in celebration of the Warp Films release: A Complete History of My Sexual Failures (dir: Chris Waitt). Saturday afternoon saw local Jersey musicians perform live as part of the Beat Happening Sessions, and Sunday afternoon saw broadcaster and writer Jonny Trunk transmit a live film soundtracks radio show for Resonance FM.

Electronica composer Zan Lyons was commissioned to create a live score to a commissioned film by artist/filmmaker Sarah Wood using Jersey archive footage, called Angel of History, to premiere in the Jersey War Tunnels.

The Kings Chamber Orchestra performed a live score to Suzie Templeton's animated version of Peter and the Wolf 1,200 local school children watched the event in the Jersey Opera House, followed by an evening public evening performance.

Folk musicians The Memory Band performed a live score by candlelight to classic British horror film The Wicker Man (1973) in the medieval hall of Mount Orgueil Castle.

The art collective Le Gun were commissioned to create an art installation at the Old Magistrate Court police cells.

Directors Barbara Hammer and Lizzie Thynne both attended Branchage for screenings of their documentary films about Jersey artists Claude Cahun and Marcel Moore. This was the first time both films had screened together, and a Q&A session was held with the two filmmakers after the films.

Comedian Graham Fellows attended Branchage in support of alter ego John Shuttleworth's feature film Southern Softies, filmed in the Channel Islands as the UK's most southerly point.

Imaginary Summer (dirs: Rebecca Coley / Richard Hall), Jersey's first-ever full length fiction feature film, was premiered at Branchage. Love Me Still (dir: Danny Hiller), funded through Jersey's Defiant Productions and starring British character actor Tom Bell, also premiered.

The Branchage Bootcamp helped local Channel Island filmmaking talent between 16 and 25 to make short documentary films to premiere at the Festival, mentored by UK filmmakers The Blaine Brothers.

The Forum Cinema (now closed) hosted classic British feature film screenings by Alfred Hitchcock, Michael Powell and David Lean.

Other documentaries screened at the Festival included Heavy Metal in Baghdad, In The Shadow of the Moon, Joy Division, The King of Kong, Patti Smith: Dream of a Life, My Winnipeg, 5 Miles North of Molkom, We Are Together, UK skateboard documentary Rollin' Through The Decades, and the classic Maysles Brothers' film Gimme Shelter. Other feature films screened included Garage, Mouth To Mouth (starring a pre-fame Ellen Page), the Brazilian box office hit Elite Squad and the Polish box office hit Ladies; many of the films were accompanied by Q&As with directors and producers. There were guest short film programmes from London Short Film Festival, Birds Eye View, the UK Film Council, Rushes Soho Shorts and Channel Four FourDocs.

There was a series of industry events hosted by Shooting People and iQ (The Apple Shop).

The festival £10,000 short film award for a Channel Island filmmaker went to director Michael Pearce, for his National Film & Television School graduation film Madrugada. The jury consisted of Rebecca Mark-Lawson (UK Film Council), James Mullighan (Shooting People), Deputy Kevin Lewis, and John Davey (Spearpoint Ltd).

The 2008 Festival closed with a screening of British comedy feature Faintheart, directed by Vito Rocco and starring Eddie Marsan, Jessica Hynes and Ewen Bremner, set amongst the world of Viking battle re-enactment societies. The screening took place at Mount Orgueil Castle, and was preceded by a drinks reception on the Castle battlements with a particularly strong serving of local cider.

== 2009 Festival ==
The second Festival opened with a screening of the Werner Herzog documentary feature about Antarctica Encounters at the End of the World in the Jersey Opera House, followed by a Q&A with Herzog's regular editor Joe Bini.

The first Branchage box office opened in an empty shop, next to the now-demolished Southampton Hotel on Weighbridge Place, right opposite the Spiegeltent.

The Branchage Spiegeltent returned to Weighbridge Square for a second year, sponsored by Barclays Wealth. Saturday night saw the return of Bordée de Branchage, featuring live performances from Kitty Daisy & Lewis, The Correspondents and Turner Prize nominee Jeremy Deller's Acid Brass, as performed by Jersey's Premier Brass. Friday night saw the 100% Dynamite reggae party hosted by Soul Jazz Records with a live set from 10-piece reggae orchestra Top Cats featuring Natty Bo, in celebration of the reggae documentary Legacy in the Dust (dir: Winston Whitter). Friday afternoon saw DJ Billy Jam transmit a live radio show for New Jersey's (New York) WFMU, and Sunday afternoon saw local Jersey musicians perform live as part of the Shear Talent, as presented by BBC Jersey Introducing.

Animagica was a Branchage live music commission at the Opera House for Iceland's Amiina to perform a new live score to the fairytale animations of Lotte Reiniger (Cinderella [1922], Sleeping Beauty [1954]). Support came from Paper Cinema, with live music by The Cabinet of Living Cinema.

Brighton's British Sea Power performed their live score to the classic 1934 documentary Man of Aran (dir: Robert Flaherty), as commissioned by the British Film Institute, which took place in the Opera House. British Sea Power wrote about Branchage in a 'takeover' of the online music magazine Drowned in Sound... their guitarist Noble, stated that Branchage was "Perhaps the most innovative and exciting new film festival in Europe.

The War Tunnels saw a unique live score to the new British documentary Isolation, an impressionistic portrait of soldiers returning from conflict, as composed and performed by the film's directors Luke Seamore and Joseph Bull alongside guest musicians.

The Battle of Branchage was a spectacular 3D mapping projection onto the side of Mount Orguiel Castle, commissioned by Branchage, with ground-breaking projection mapping by Seeper using the latest technology and sound by Flat-e. Vimeo footage of the event went globally viral following the Festival, and was reported in Wired magazine as a significant event on the technology circuit.

Site-Eye were commissioned to create a 3D time-lapse film at various Jersey locations, which were screened as an installation in the Branchage box office.

The Branchage Drive-In screened classic films Some Like It Hot and The Wizard of Oz from 35mm film, in Peoples Park.

Kim Longinotto's powerful documentary Rough Aunties, about the Bobbi Bear charity for abused children in South Africa, was accompanied by members of the charity, some of whom hadn't been outside of South Africa. A charity raffle to raise money for Bobbi Bear included a Ferrari sports car donated by a Jersey resident.

Magical site-specific screenings included Gideon Koppel's observational film Sleep Furiously about a small Welsh farming community, screened in a barn at the Classic Herd Farm, the relaxing monastery documentary Into Great Silence, screened in the quiet confines of the St Helier Town Church, and Irish children's fairytale animation The Secret of Kells, in Mount Orgiel Castle.

Branchage engaged with a younger Jersey audience by staging a series of events at the Live Lounge club, including screenings of documentaries about Soulwax, the All Tomorrow's Parties music festival, grime artist Dizzee Rascal, and a live indie music night hosted by The Asylum with local bands performing. And for even younger audiences, Aardman animator Richard Golesowski attended to present his latest Shaun The Sheep short films for schools and young children.

Classic British feature if.... (dir: Lindsay Anderson, 1968) was presented in the chapel of Victoria College, followed by a Q&A with David Wood discussing his experiences as young actor on the film, playing opposite Malcolm MacDowell.

British filmmaker and artist Andrew Kotting attended Branchage to screen a selection of his work and to hold a Town Hall meeting to launch the Jersey Jape project, to use Jersey residents home movie footage in a future film project. Unfortunately, funding wasn't secured to continue the project into the following year, and it was abandoned.

British filmmakers The Blaine Brothers returned to Branchage to head up the Vauxhall 48 Hour Road Movie Challenge, for local Jersey filmmakers to make a film in 2 days, to screen at the Branchage Drive-In before the main features.

Other documentaries screened at the Festival included Burma VJ, Carmen Meets Borat, End of the Line, Grizzly Man, Only When I Dance, The Posters Came From The Walls, and Sounds Like Teen Spirit. Other feature films screened included Fish Tank, Le Donk and Unrelated; many of the films were accompanied by Q&As with directors and producers. There were guest short film programmes from London Short Film Festival, Peccadillo Pictures, the UK Film Council, Rushes Soho Shorts, Sheffield Doc/Fest, and an animation retrospective by Max Hattler.

There was a series of industry events hosted by BAFTA, 4Docs, Shooting People, and a journalist mentoring scheme hosted by The Quietus.

The festival £2000 Cutting Hedge short film award went to Rowland Jobson for his film Girl Like Me. The jury consisted of Ed Fletcher (Soda Pictures), Claire Cook (BBC Film Network), and Kobi Prempeh (Future Films).

The 2009 Festival was planned to close with a screening of British science-fiction feature Moon, directed by Duncan Jones and starring Sam Rockwell, with Jones in attendance for a Q&A, to take place at the Jersey Opera House. Unfortunately, due to last minute unavoidable technical issues, the Opera House screening was cancelled and replaced by a second screening of the documentary feature Big River Man (dir: John Maringouin). Moon was rescheduled to screen later the same night at St Helier Cineworld, with Jones still in attendance.

== 2010 Festival ==
The third Festival opened for the first time with a fiction film, with a screening of the new Stephen Frears comedy drama Tamara Drewe based on the graphic novel by Posy Simmonds, in the Jersey Opera House, followed by a Q&A with lead actor Roger Allam (who attended on a break from his role on the London stage as Shakespeare's King Lear).

The second Branchage box office opened in another empty shop in St Helier town, on the corner of Burrard Street and Cattle Street.

The Branchage Spiegeltent returned to Weighbridge Square for a third year, again sponsored by Barclays Wealth. Saturday night saw the now ubiquitous Bordée de Branchage return, featuring a live performance from the 8-piece gypsy Ziveli Orkestra direct from Paris, and a Victorian seaside boardwalk theme. Friday night saw London's cool Lock Tavern host an Adventures in the Beetroot Field party with a live set from prog-disco-metal orchestra Chrome Hoof and a DJ set from Filthy Dukes. Friday afternoon saw DJ Billy Jam return to Branchage to transmit another live radio show for New Jersey's (New York) WFMU, and Sunday afternoon saw Yarn Festival present a storytelling workshop.

Eisenstein's classic 1925 silent film Battleship Potemkin was screened with live performance by French electronic duo Zombie Zombie on the back of the Duke of Normandy tugboat in St Helier's harbour; a spectacular photo of the event became a Branchage symbol to really show the inventiveness and ground-breaking aspects of the Festival.

London based Japanese experimental rock band Bo Ningen were commissioned by Branchage to perform an intense new score to the disturbing Japanese anime Cat Soup (dir: Tatsuo Sato, 2001)

Experimental electronica artist Scanner collaborated across generations with Jersey's own Mrs Waddington's magic lantern slide collection, as he performed electronic and digital soundscapes alongside a Victorian lantern show in a drawing room of the 19th century Merchant's House.

Founder members of Welsh indie band Gorky's Zygotic Mynci, Euros Childs and Richard James, were commissioned by Branchage to create a new score to the classic Russian animation of Yuri Norstein, including his 1975 masterpiece Hedgehog in the Fog, taking place in St Helier Town Church. Support came from a retrospective of Jersey animator Julia Coutanche.

French musician Pevin Kinel performed a solo live score to the harrowing documentary Our Daily Bread, about modern day food production, which took place at the Classic Herd Farm.

London's Little Angel Theatre came to the Jersey Opera House to present The Fabulous Flutterbys puppet show for children, with live music by jazz legend Barb Jungr.

Branchage begins to branch out (no pun intended) into further artforms beyond film and music: Live comedy arrives at Branchage for the first time in the form of Comedy Rocks at Club 72 (now demolished), featuring stand-up from Paul Foot, Angelos Epithemiou and Jeff Leach. Washington, D.C. musician and author Ian Svenonius attends Branchage to give a storytelling walking tour across Jersey's 'moon landscape' tidal flatlands. Zoologist and on-line filmmaker Lucy Cooke talks about her work with sloths. And Branchage takes a foray into sound walks, with Always Something Somewhere Else, around St Helier with a pair of headphones.

Magical site-specific screenings included Liz Mermin's horse-racing documentary Horses screened in a horse box!, and the activist documentary The Vanishing of the Bees, screening in a polytunnel in a field on the Jersey Organic Farm and followed by a heated discussion involving Jersey's agricultural community. Jersey Opera House saw screenings of The Doors documentary When You're Strange with a Doors covers band, and 70s pop star and Jersey resident Gilbert O'Sullivan attended his portrait documentary Out on his Own for a Q&A.

Branchage inspiration True/False Film Festival (which takes place in Missouri, US) attended the Festival to host a series of documentary screenings including American: The Bill Hicks Story, Cowboys in India, and Last Train Home.

Other documentaries screened at the Festival included Separado! (with Super Furry Animals' Gruff Rhys in attendance) Mario and Nini, Shed Your Tears and Walk Away, Shelter in Place, and Videocracy. Other feature films screened included A Town Called Panic, Gainsbourg, I Am Love, London River, Lourdes, Skeletons, and classic films Breathless and Went The Day Well?; many of the films were accompanied by Q&As with directors and producers. There were guest short film programmes from London Short Film Festival, Rich Pickings, Peccadillo Pictures, and Rushes Soho Shorts.

There was a series of industry events including the launch of a Channel Island Filmmakers Network, a day for schools about getting into the film industry, and a second year of the journalist mentoring scheme hosted by The Quietus.

There was no short film award at the 2010 Branchage Festival.

The 2010 Festival closed at the Jersey Opera House with a screening of the uplifting documentary feature Out of the Ashes, about the Afghanistan cricket team as it rises from obscurity out of cricket's lowest ranks to become a phenomenal success on the international arena. Co-director Leslie Knott attended for a Q&A.

== 2011 Festival ==
The fourth Festival returned to a documentary for its opening night film, with a screening of the award-winning Asif Kapadia Formula One doc Senna, in the Jersey Opera House, followed by a Q&A with writer Manish Pandey.

The third Branchage box office came back to the harbour front in St Helier, taking over an empty unit in the newly refurbished abattoir, Liberty Wharf.

The Branchage Spiegeltent returned to Weighbridge Square for a fourth year, sponsored by Barclays Wealth for a third year. Saturday night saw the incredibly popular Bordée de Branchage return with a mythical island theme, featuring a live performance from the 8-piece marching band Perhaps Contraption, alongside Gertie and her Gaiety. Friday night finally saw Jersey mainstay Bergerac engage with Branchage, with a black tie dinner with lead actor John Nettles in conversation, and further cast members in attendance to talk about the TV show's lasting legacy. Saturday afternoon saw live comedy return to Branchage with Whose Hedge Is It Anyway? featuring live stand-up from Jeff Leech, Mark Dolan and Sara Pascoe, and Sunday afternoon saw The Tonic Record Club No Man Is An Island broadcast on BBC Radio Jersey as Branchage guests bring records to play and discuss on an island theme.

== 2012 and 2013 festivals ==
The festival ran into funding difficulties and lay dormant for two years, while a grant was negotiated with the States of Jersey Economic Development Department.

However, a special screening of Searching for Sugar Man was held in Jersey at the Hotel de France, to an audience of 800. Festival patron and producer of the film Simon Chinn was in attendance for the Q&A, which was followed by a surprise appearance from musician and star of the show Sixto Rodriguez, who had flown from Detroit to begin his UK tour. The film was preceded with a commissioned performance by performance artist Nissa Nishikawa, photographer Jonathan Hallam and film composer Tandis Jenhudson.

== 2014 Festival ==
After a two-year hiatus, the festival made a comeback in 2014 moving its Spiegeltent headquarters from St Helier to Coronation Park. As well as changing its location, the festival took a different approach to programming, and appointed two guest curators, French fashion designer agnès b and BBC Radiophonic Workshop.

The Festival opened once again in the Jersey Opera House with a screening of How We Used To Live Paul Kelly's documentary about vanishing London with live soundtrack from Saint Etienne, with a Q&A panel discussion with the writers of the film Bob Stanley and Travis Elborough along with British Pop Artist Sir Peter Blake.
