= Dieci Boutique Restaurant =

Coordinates: 43.1346°N 26.1228°E

- Interactive map of Dieci Boutique Restaurant

Restaurant information
- Established: 14 May 2021
- Owners: Gianfranco Chiarini, Anna Chiarini, Jimmy Beasley
- Head chef: Gianfranco Chiarini
- Food type: Tasting menu, seasonal, Bulgarian cuisine
- Dress code: Smart casual
- Location: Devino, Bulgaria
- Reservations: Required
- Website: dieciboutique.com

Dieci Boutique Restaurant is a fine dining establishment located in the village of Devino, Bulgaria. The restaurant was founded by chef Gianfranco Chiarini, his wife and sommelier Anna Chiarini, and business partner Jimmy Beasley. In 2026, it was named Restaurant of the Year Aqua Panna & S.Pellegrino at the Bacchus Restaurant of the Year awards in Sofia.

== History ==
The restaurant is housed in a structure that formerly served as a local elementary school, originally built around 120 years ago and left unused since the late 1990s following the dissolution of the Soviet Union.

In 2025, it received a three-star rating from the Sustainable Restaurant Association based in London, as the only 100% sustainable restaurant in Bulgaria at that time. Green Key International, headquartered in Copenhagen, named it the most sustainable restaurant in Eastern Europe for that year.

In 2026, the restaurant renewed its Green Key environmental certification.

In 2026, the restaurant was included in the La Liste Top 1000 restaurants in the world.

In 2026, Dieci Boutique Restaurant became the official headquarters of the Bailliage de Bulgarie of La Chaîne des Rôtisseurs, the Bulgarian national chapter of the international gastronomic society whose historical origins date to 1248.

The Bulgarian Bailliage was formally inaugurated on 3 November 2026 at Tipchenitza Winery in Tipchenitsa, Bulgaria. The ceremony included the induction of 45 founding members and was officiated by Jörg Thomas Böckeler, Chancelier d'Allemagne and member of the Conseil d'Administration of La Chaîne des Rôtisseurs in Paris, acting as Inauguration Officer and Master of Ceremonies.

Anna Chiarini serves as Bailli Délégué de Bulgarie, while chef Gianfranco Chiarini serves as Chancelier de Bulgarie. The national headquarters of the Bailliage de Bulgarie is located at Dieci Boutique Restaurant in Devino, Targovishte Province, Bulgaria.

The inaugural ceremony featured a seven-course tasting menu prepared by Dieci Boutique Restaurant, showcasing contemporary Bulgarian cuisine and locally sourced ingredients.

In 2026, Dieci Boutique Restaurant received the Ospitalità Italiana certification, awarded by the Italian Chambers of Commerce to restaurants outside Italy that meet established standards of authenticity, quality, and Italian hospitality.

In 2026, Dieci's chef-owner Gianfranco Chiarini was admitted to the Associazione Italiana Ambasciatori del Gusto (Ambasciatori del Gusto), an Italian association founded in 2016 that brings together professionals dedicated to promoting Italian gastronomy, hospitality, and food culture. Its membership includes three-Michelin-starred chefs Massimo Bottura, Antonino Cannavacciuolo, Enrico Bartolini, Niko Romito and Giancarlo Perbellini, as well as Carlo Cracco and Andrea Berton. Chiarini's admission was formally marked at a ceremony in Milan on 30 July 2026, where he was welcomed by the association's president, chef Alessandro Gilmozzi.

In August 2026, Dieci became the first Bulgarian restaurant to be included in the We're Smart Green Guide with a rating of three radishes. The guide defines a three-radish restaurant as vegetable-forward, with an additional focus on sustainability.

National broadcaster NOVA TV has reported that Dieci may become the first restaurant in Bulgaria to receive a Michelin star when the Michelin Guide expands into the country.

In 2026, Dieci Boutique Restaurant was named Restaurant of the Year Aqua Panna & S.Pellegrino at the annual awards organized by Bacchus magazine, held in Sofia on 12 March 2026.

=== Concept and operations ===
It operates on a small scale, offering a 10-course seasonal tasting menu to no more than 10 guests per evening. The menu is strictly farm-to-table and composed exclusively of Bulgarian ingredients. Water is sourced from a natural deep well, and renovations included the use of eco-friendly materials, including hemp-based insulation and carpeting. It processes its own food waste and recycles plastic, glass, metal, and paper materials. It became energy-independent and zero-waste in 2024.

== Publications ==
In 2023, the restaurant published a book titled One of a Kind, detailing its philosophy, design, and culinary approach. In early 2026, Dieci Boutique Restaurant published a second book, Dieci & Beyond, documenting aspects of its sustainability practices and a selection of its recipes; the book is listed on the publisher’s platform.
