= Allegro (Satie) =

1884 piano piece by Erik Satie

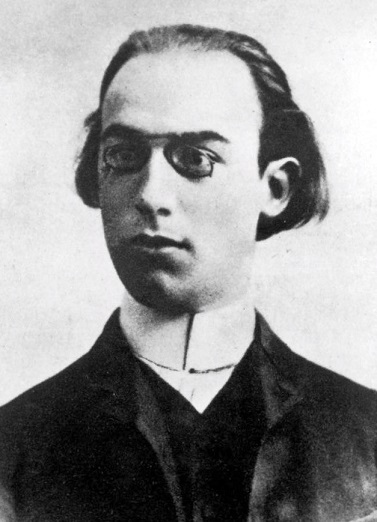
Erik Satie in 1884

The Allegro is a brief piano piece by Erik Satie. Dated September 9, 1884, when Satie was 18, it is his earliest known composition. It also marked the first time he signed his given name as "Erik" instead of "Éric".

== Description ==
In 1884 Satie was still struggling through his unhappy studies (1879–86) at the Paris Conservatoire, which he later described as a "penitentiary". Significantly, he produced the Allegro – his first surviving attempt at composing – not as a student exercise but on his own, during a summer holiday visit to his native Honfleur in Normandy. It was the only music he would ever compose in his hometown.

The breezy, irony-free optimism of the nine-bar Allegro is uncharacteristic of Satie's subsequent work. It is a musical postcard of sorts, quoting the well-known song Ma Normandie (1836) by Frédéric Bérat. A snatch of the refrain, the lyrics of which are "J'irai revoir ma Normandie" ("I long to see my Normandy"), is discreetly worked into the middle of the piece. Biographer Mary E. Davis saw this early instance of musical borrowing as a "surprising glimpse of Satie's future compositional style" and added, "The musical reference, clear enough to be audible by any listener familiar with the tune, creates an allusion to both song and place, thus deepening the experience beyond the purely sonic realm into the arena of memory and nostalgia."

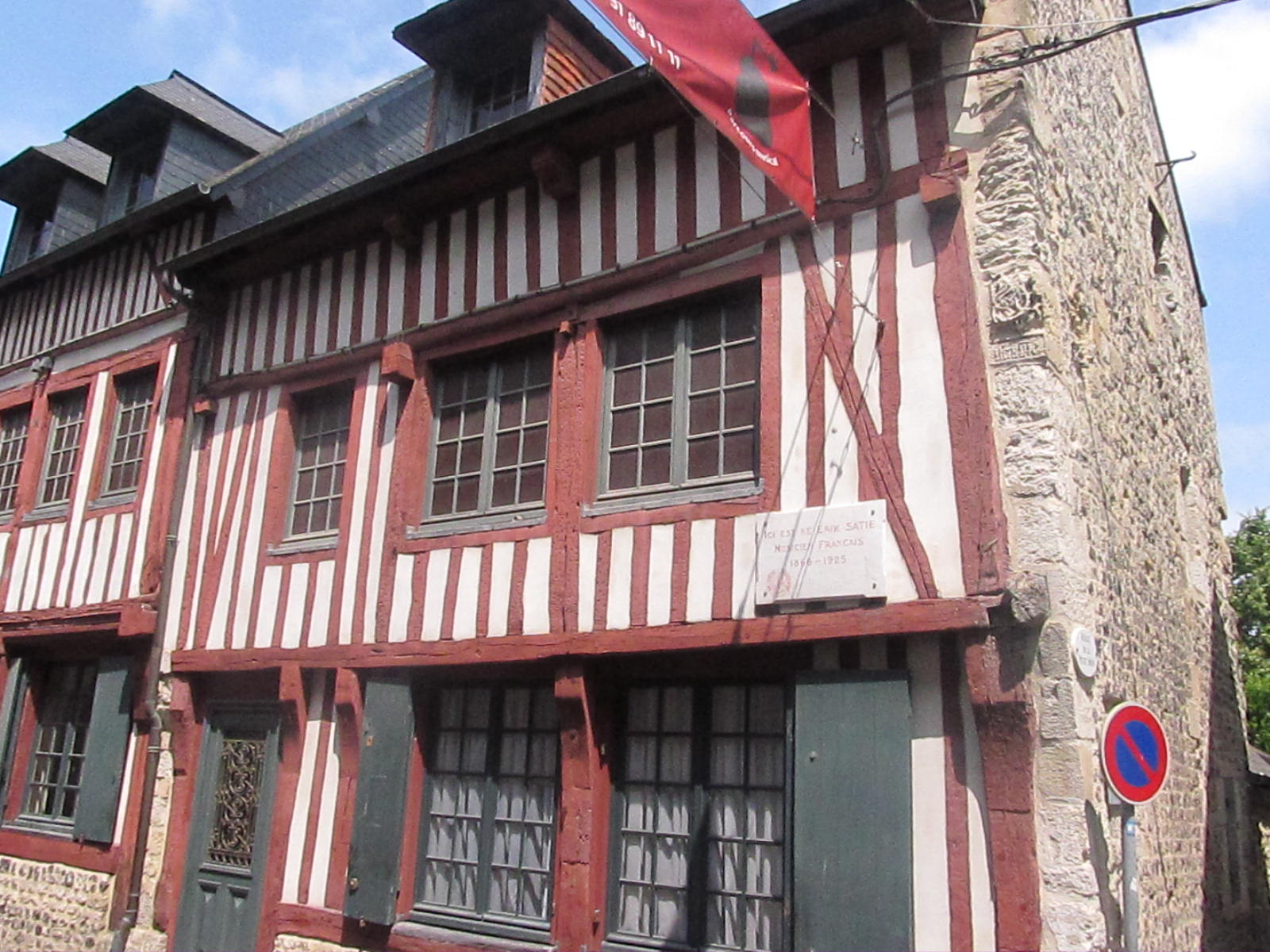
Satie's birthplace in Honfleur, now a museum

In his book Satie the Bohemian (1999), Steven Moore Whiting asserted that this bit of juvenilia revealed "no precocity whatever...an isolated case of allusion to popular repertoire, and an utter lack of awareness how to proceed beyond a promising start." Pianist-musicologist Olof Höjer, on the other hand, found it more technically interesting, noting how Satie deliberately compressed an already minuscule piece through the use of a short bridge passage.

The existence of the Allegro was unknown for nearly a century before it was discovered amongst Satie's papers at the Bibliothèque nationale de France. Facsimiles of the manuscript were first published by Alan M. Gillmor (1972) and Nigel Wilkins (1980). Three performance versions, edited by Robert Orledge, were issued by Salabert between 1995 and 1998. The Allegro was given its concert premiere by pianist Giancarlo Carlini at the Teatro di Porta Romana in Milan, Italy, on April 12, 1980. It was first recorded by Jean-Pierre Armengaud for the Le Chant Du Monde label in 1986.

== Recordings ==
Recordings of the Allegro have been primarily confined to comprehensive editions of Satie's piano music: Aldo Ciccolini (EMI, 1988), Olof Höjer (Swedish Society Discofil, 1996), Jean-Yves Thibaudet (Decca, 2002), Cristina Ariagno (Brilliant Classics, 2006) and Alessandro Simonetto (OnClassical, 2021) who made an unedited version with an originally deleted passage.
