= KCO =

KCO may refer to:

== Music ==
- KCO, the former stage name of Keiko (musician)
- Kings Chamber Orchestra, a chamber orchestra based in the United Kingdom
- Kirkland Civic Orchestra
- Royal Concertgebouw Orchestra (Dutch: Koninklĳk Concertgebouworkest), a symphony orchestra based in Amsterdam
- Korean Chamber Orchestra

== Other uses ==
- Agip KCO, a division of Agip operating in the Kazakhstan (northern) sector of the Caspian Sea
- Cengiz Topel Naval Air Station (IATA code KCO), a Turkish Navy air station and civil airport in Kocaeli Province, Turkey
- Kelly's Coal Office, coal merchant offices, John Kelly Limited, Northern Ireland
- Kenniscentrum voor Coöperatief Ondernemen KU Leuven, Centre of Expertise for Cooperative Entrepreneurship
