= Island Home (anthem) =

Song from Jersey

- National anthem of Jersey
- Lyrics: Gerard Le Feuvre, 2002
- Music: Gerard Le Feuvre
- Adopted: 2008
- Relinquished: 2025

"Island Home" is a musical composition that the Bailiwick of Jersey, a Crown Dependency, formerly listed as its anthem. It was written and composed by musician Gerard Le Feuvre. The song was written in 2002 and adopted in 2008 after a contest to find an official anthem for Jersey. However, in 2025 States Assembly formalised Beautiful Jersey as Jersey's local anthem.

== Background ==
Traditionally, Jersey used the British national anthem, "God Save the Queen" (or "God Save the King"), as a symbol of loyalty to the Crown. When times came for a unique individual song to be used as Jersey's anthem because many other states also used "God Save the Queen", Jersey had two unofficial options. The first was "Ma Normandie", which was designed as a reference to Jersey's historical heritage as a part of the Duchy of Normandy and was first used at the 1958 British Empire and Commonwealth Games and used as the anthem for future Commonwealth Games. The other was "Beautiful Jersey", which was written and performed after the liberation of the Channel Islands from Nazi occupation and had been performed annually at Liberation Day celebrations.

== History ==
In 2007, a contest was held to determine the official anthem of Jersey. A shortlist of five was drawn up from twenty-three entries. "Ma Normandie" was controversially excluded from the shortlist despite lyrics from it previously adorning banknotes of the Jersey pound. The justification for exclusion was that the song had no direct connection to Jersey and references France in its lyrics. The contest was judged by a panel of five judges and an audience of the public. After voting, the Bailiff of Jersey announced the contest had been won by "Island Home" written by Gerard Le Feuvre in 2002 from St Ouen. Le Feuvre's inspiration was to have a song that was simple for children to sing but also inspire unity. The song was inspired by the wildlife in Jersey, with the first three notes designed to imitate the lowing of a Jersey cow. The song was written in English, but Le Feuvre said he would release a Jèrriais version. The song was first performed at the Jersey Opera House on Liberation Day 2008. "Island Home" started to be played at official events and schools in Jersey before being confirmed as the anthem.

== Criticism ==
The decision to select "Island Home" was controversial, as although the public voted against it in favour of "Beautiful Jersey", their votes were collated as one vote, with the panel members individually getting one vote each, thus the public were outvoted. The decision was intended to be ratified by the States of Jersey, however the proposal was never sent to the legislature, leading to Senators requesting in 2010 that the contest be rerun and demanding that it not be officially described as the Jersey anthem. In rugby, the Jersey Touch Rugby Association refused to use it, instead preferring to retain "Ma Normandie". In 2015, the Jersey Island Games team dropped it in favour of "Beautiful Jersey", after athletes called it "dreary and uninspiring".

In 2025, a formal public poll was held on what Jersey's anthem should be. "Beautiful Jersey" came first, followed by "God Save the King". "Island Home" only gained 12 votes, behind "Ma Normandie". The States of Jersey formally approved this poll to make "Beautiful Jersey" the official anthem of Jersey instead of "Island Home".

== Lyrics ==
English original

Ours is an Island home
Firm on rock and strong by sea
Loyal and proud in history,
Our thankful hearts are
Raised to God for Jersey.

The beauty of our land
Long inspires both eye and mind.
Ours the privilege to guard its shore
So help we God that
Jersey might by grace endure.

Jèrriais version

Nouot' Île est nouotre siez nous
Firme sus l'rot chi forte par mé
Louoyale histouaithe et orgilleuse
tchoeurs èr connaîs sants l'vées
à Dgi pouor Jèrri

La bieauté d'nouotre pays
Înspithe yi et lé esprit
Nouot're privilèdge lé soin san bord
Qué Dgieu nouos' Aîgue qué
Jèrri peut par grâce tcheindre bouon

== See also ==
- List of British anthems
