= Guernsey Festival of Performing Arts =

The Guernsey Festival
- Genre: Rock, Alternative rock, Indie rock, Dance.
- Dates: No set dates (2 days)
- Locations: Saint Sampson, Guernsey, Channel Islands
- Years active: 2011–2012
- Website: http://www.guernseyfestival.gg

The Guernsey Festival was a pop music/rock music festival held at The Rabbit Warren in the parish of Saint Sampson, Guernsey. The first festival took place 2–3 July 2011. The second festival took place on the weekend of 23–24 June 2012. On 5 January, the organisers announced that the Guernsey Festival 2013 was on hold.

== Organisation ==
The Guernsey Festival has been organised by brothers Jon and Paul Stephen since its inception in 2011.

== Guernsey Festival 2011 - 2–3 July 2011 ==
	Main Stage	Infectious Rhythm Dance Arena	The Get Down Stage	Chaos Stage	
Sat 2 July	Ocean Colour Scene (Headline); Frank Turner; The Go! Team; Chipmunk - (Did not perform due to unforeseen circumstances); Hayseed Dixie; Audrey Horne; Kieran Gaffney; Nemesis (GSY); The Stowaways (UK); CourageHaveCourage (UK); Brave Yesterday (JSY); Last of the Light Brigade (GSY) www.lotlb.com	Seb Fontaine; Ant Brooks; Nakadia (Thailand); Darius Syrossian (VIVa MUSIC) (UK); Shaun Kay (Drop the Bass) (NZ); Silent Disco by SilentArena			From Bedrooms To Backseats
Sun 3 July	Primal Scream (Headline); The Gaslight Anthem; Example; Lissie - (Delays in her flights meant that Lissie was only able to perform one song); The PeteBox (UK); Zero One Zero (GSY/UK); Twist & Pulse (Britain's Got Talent); Chris Connor (UK) Feat. The Sweet Inspirations (USA); Asylum Seekas (GSY); Teaspoonriverneck (GSY); Jaded Things (JSY); Gay Army (GSY)	Tom Novy; Danny Rampling; Krafty Kuts - Instant Vibes (UK); A.Skillz - Jam City (UK); Greg Wilson (UK); Silent Disco by SilentArena			

== See also ==
- Music of the Channel Islands
