= Finnegan Shannon =

American multidisciplinary artist

Finnegan Shannon (formerly Shannon Finnegan; born 1989) is an American multidisciplinary artist located in New York City, United States. Working primarily on increasing perceptions of accessibility, Finnegan's practice focuses on disability culture in inaccessible spaces. Finnegan is most known for their protest pieces such as art gallery benches criticizing lack of seating and lounges for those who cannot access stairs.

== Background and identity ==
Finnegan Shannon has been disabled their whole life, but grew up feeling isolated from the disability community. They experience pain when walking and standing, and thus focus on their need to consistently rest.

Finnegan graduated with a BA in Studio Art from Carleton College in 2011, and immediately began working at the Wassaic Project through 2014

Their work has been exhibited in major cultural institutions internationally, including the Banff Centre for Arts and Creativity, Friends of the High Line, the Tallinn Art Hall, Nook Gallery., and the Wassaic Project They have spoken about their work at the Brooklyn Museum, the School for Poetic Computation, The 8th Floor, and The Andrew Heiskell Braille and Talking Book Library.

In 2018, Finnegan received a Wynn Newhouse Award. and participated in Art Beyond Sight's Art + Disability Residency In 2019, Finnegan was an artist-in-residence at Eyebeam. Their work has been written about in C Magazine, Art in America, Hyperallergic, and the New York Times.

== Solo projects ==
- DUEL at the OUTLET Fine Art, Brooklyn, NY in 2013
- SHOULD / CAN'T, at The Invisible Dog, Brooklyn, NY in 2014
- The Worst at Carleton College, Northfield, MN in 2016
- fashionablecanes dot com on Tête-à-Tête, tete-ahh-tete.net in 2017
- Self-portrait at The Invisible Dog Art Center, Brooklyn, NY in 2017
- Anti-Stairs Club Lounge at the Wassaic Project, Wassaic, NY in 2017
- Disability History PSA, Eastern Pole, Cincinnati, OH in 2018
- Alt-Text as Poetry, developed at Eyebeam, presented at Queens Museum, Pratt, BAMPFA, and others in 2019
- Anti-Stairs Club Lounge, Vessel at Hudson Yards, New York, NY in 2019
- Lone Proponent of Wall-to-Wall Carpet, Carleton University Art Gallery, Ottawa, Canada in 2020

== Group exhibitions ==
- Disrupt and Resist, Mason Exhibitions Center, Arlington, VA.
- She's Crafty (in collaboration with Breanne Trammell) at The New Museum Store, New York, NY in 2012
- Peaces on Earth, at Sardine, Brooklyn, NY in 2012
- Everything is Index at The Invisible Dog, Brooklyn, NY in 2012
- Homeward Found, at The Wassaic Project, Wassaic, NY in 2013
- INK + IMAGE, OUTLET Fine Art in collaboration with The Center For Fiction, at Brooklyn, NY in 2013
- Drawings Along Myrtle Ave, Organized by Pratt Institute, at Brooklyn, NY in 2014
- All That & A Bag of Chips, at Dead Space, Brooklyn, NY in 2014
- BOGO, Davidson Contemporary, at New York, NY in 2015
- Company, at A4 Contemporary Art Center, Chengdu, China in 2015
- The Descent of Dust at Radiator Arts, New York, NY in 2016
- Endless Biennial, at 20/20 Gallery, Elizabeth Foundation for the Arts, New York, NY in 2016
- Reflections on Failure, at Radiator Arts, Queens, NY in 2016
- Sociometry Fair 2016, at The Smell, Los Angeles, CA in 2016
- Wynn Newhouse Awards, at The Palitz Gallery, New York, NY in 2017
- Manifesto, at Nook Gallery, Oakland, CA in 2017
- Locus: Art as a Disabled Space, at The 8th Floor, New York, NY in 2018
- Means of Egress, at Dedalus Foundation, Brooklyn, NY in 2018
- Sign Project: Access and Accessibility Stories, at High Line, New York, NY in 2019
- Disarming Language, at Tallinn Art Hall, Tallinn, Estonia in 2019
- On Audio Description, in collaboration with Aislinn Thomas, at Banff Centre, Alberta, Canada in 2019
- Talk Back, at Flux Factory, Queens, NY in 2019
- Crip Imponderabilia, at NYU Galletin, New York, NY in 2019

== Awards ==
- 2012 and 2013 Selected artist, Short list curated by Kris Nuzzi, BRIC Artist Registry, Brooklyn, NY
- 2014 Nominee, Rema Hort Mann Foundation Emerging Artist Grant, New York, NY
- 2015 Grantee, Awesome Foundation, New York, NY

== Residencies ==
- 2012 Resident, The Wassaic Project, Wassaic, NY
- 2015 Fellow, Copy Shop Residency, Endless Editions, New York, NY
- 2018 Recipient, Wynn Newhouse Award, New York, NY
- 2018 Resident, Ace Hotel Artist Residency, Curated by Taeyoon Choi, New York, NY
- 2018 Resident, Art + Disability Residency, Art Beyond Sight, New York, N Y
- 2018 Fellow, WITH x SYPartners, New York, NY
- 2019 Resident, at Eyebeam, New York, NY in 2019
- 2023 Resident, Pioneer Works, New York, NY

== See also ==
- Jennifer White-Johnson
- Indira Allegra
