= Chiarini =

Chiarini is an Italian surname. Notable people with the surname include:

- Daniele Chiarini (born 1979), Italian footballer
- Duccio Chiarini (born 1977), Italian film director
- Gianfranco Chiarini (born 1966), Italian chef and television personality
- Giuseppe Chiarini (1823 – 1897), Italian-born equestrian and circus director
- Julio Chiarini (born 1982), Argentine retired football goalkeeper.
- Luigi Chiarini (1789 – 1832), Italian abbot, orientalist and translator
- Luigi Chiarini (1900 – 1975), Italian film theorist, essayist, screenwriter and film director
- Marcantonio Chiarini (c. 1652 – 1730), Italian painter
- Mario Chiarini (born 1981), Italian baseball player
- Pietro Chiarini (c. 1717 – 1765), Italian composer
- Riccardo Chiarini (born 1984), Italian cyclist
- Vittorio Chiarini (born 1937), Italian retired racing cyclist

== See also ==
- 10376 Chiarini, main-belt asteroid
