= Allegra =

Allegra may refer to:

== People ==
- Allegra (given name), people with the given name Allegra
- Antonio Allegra (1905–1969), Italian organist and lyricist
- Donna Allegra (1953–2020), American writer
- Chad Allegra (born 1980), American professional wrestler better known as Karl Anderson
- Francis Allegra (1957–2015), judge of the U.S. Court of Federal Claims
- Gabriele Allegra (1907–1976), beatified Italian Catholic priest
- Indira Allegra (born c. 1980), multidisciplinary American artist and writer
- Salvatore Allegra (1898–1993), Italian composer

== Comics ==
- Allegra (comics), an Image Comics character
- Allegra Garcia, a DC Comics character
- Valentina Allegra de Fontaine, a Marvel Comics character

== Railway ==
- Rhaetian Railway ABe 8/12, a powerful three-car electric multiple-unit train on Swiss meter gauge
- The brand name for the Hakone Tozan 3000 series trains in Japan

== Drugs ==
- Fexofenadine, an antihistamine drug sold under the brand names Allegra, Allerfexo, Telfast, and others

== Other ==
- Allegra, 1999 live album by Fifteen
- Opel Allegra, a car
- Allegra, a greeting in the Romansh language of south-eastern Switzerland
- Allegra (genus), a genus of protists belonging to the group Placidozoa

== See also ==
- Allegro (disambiguation)
