= Beautiful Jersey =

Patriotic song in Jersey

- National anthem of Jersey
- Lyrics: Lindsay Lennox
- Music: Lindsay Lennox
- Adopted: 2025

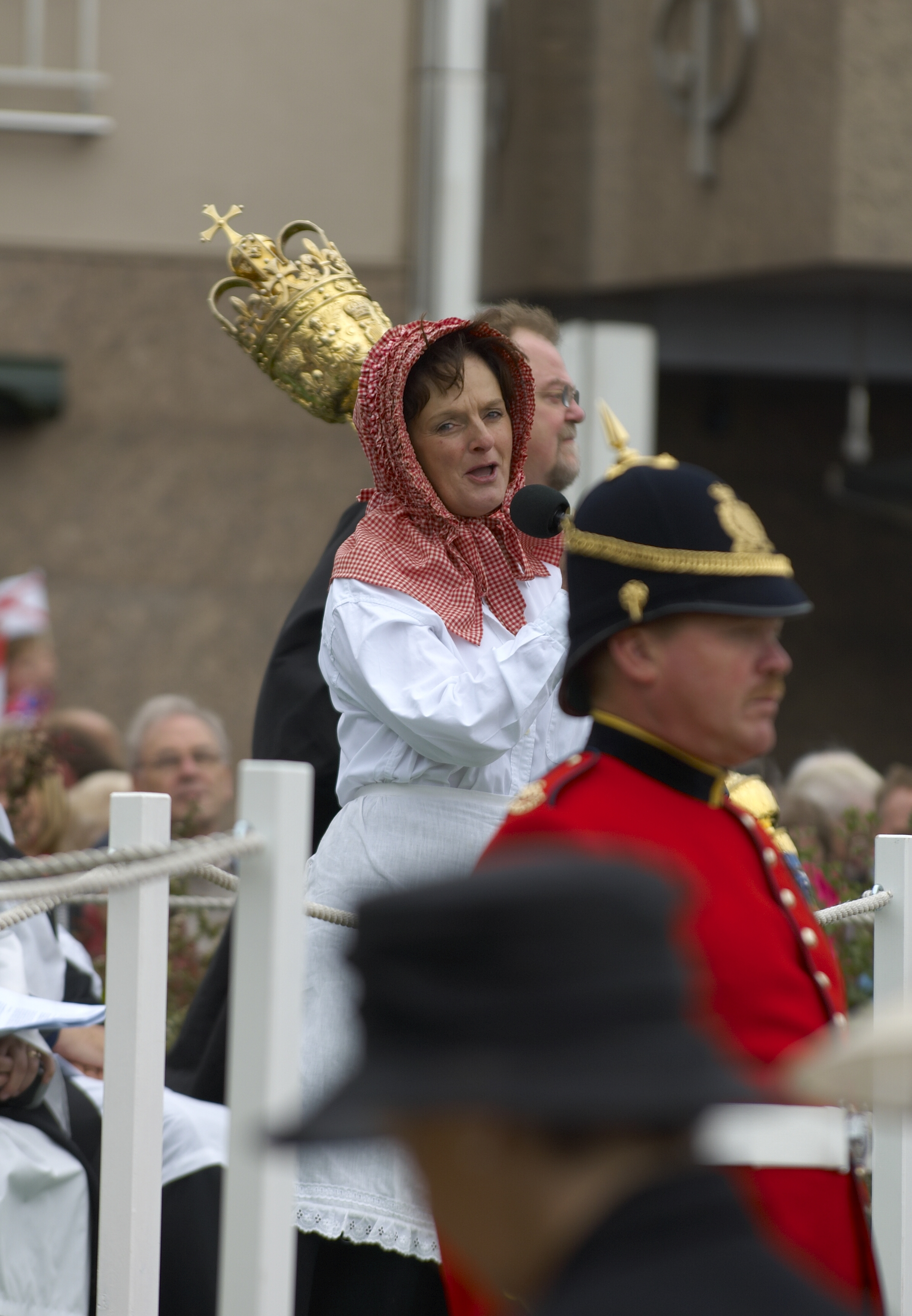
Sadie Le Sueur-Rennard singing Man Bieau P'tit Jèrri

Beautiful Jersey or Man Bieau P'tit Jèrri is the local anthem of Jersey, sung in Jèrriais and English. It was composed by Englishman Lindsay Lennox, who died in 1906. During the Occupation, islanders would sing the song to keep their spirits up. Today it is performed at Liberation Day and as Jersey's national anthem at some sporting events. In 2025 it was formalised as Jersey's local anthem.

== Use ==
Every year, Beautiful Jersey is sung at the main Liberation Day service in Liberation Square. Sadie Le Sueur-Rennard, the late Connétable of St Saviour used to sing the song.

== National anthem ==
Originally, "Ma Normandie" was used as the de facto Jersey anthem but in 2007, the States of Jersey asked the public what should be the Jersey anthem due to "Ma Normandie" not mentioning Jersey. The public voted for "Beautiful Jersey" but they were overridden by a panel of experts who voted for "Island Home". Due to the controversy, the States never ratified the decision. In a 2015 poll by the Jersey Evening Post, over a third of islanders questioned wanted Beautiful Jersey to be recognised as the national anthem for Jersey, compared to under 20% for Island Home. In 2025 it was formalised as the local anthem for Jersey, instead of Island Home. This came after a public vote where "Beautiful Jersey" finished top ahead of "God Save the King" and "Ma Normandie". Even still, it had been performed as the national anthem for Jersey in the 2015 Island Games for the opening and medal ceremonies.

== Lyrics ==
Jèrriais lyrics

Y’a un coin d’tèrre qué j’aime, qué j’n’oubliéthai janmais -
Dans mes pensées tréjous preunmyi -
Car jé n’vai rein à compather à ses bieautés
Dans touos mes viages à l’êtrangi.
Jèrri, man paradis, pus belle taque souos l’solé -
Qué j’aime la paix dé chu Jèrri!
L’amour lé veurt, j’ai si envie dé m’en r’aller
Èrvaie man chièr pétit pays.

Man bieau p’tit Jèrri, la reine des îles,
Lieu dé ma naîssance, tu m’pâsse bein près du tchoeu;
Ô, tchi doux souv’nîn du bouôn temps qu’j’ai ieu
Quand j’pense à Jèrri, la reine des îles!

Jé connais touos tes charmes; et combein qu’j’en ai joui
Auve euné chiéthe anmie, aut’ fais!
Quand même qué pouor achteu jé n’sais pon tout près d’lyi
N’y’a rein qu’Jèrri dans mes pensées.
Et pis, coumme tout bouôn Jèrriais, dans l’fond dé man tchoeu
J’ai grand’ envie dé m’en r’aller
Dans l’île tchi m’a donné tant d’amour et d’bonheu,
Èrvaie ma chiéthe et man siez-me!

Man bieau p’tit Jèrri, la reine des îles
Lieu dé ma naîssance, tu m’pâsse bein près du tchoeu;
Ô, tchi doux souv’nîn du bouôn temps qu’j’ai ieu
Quand j’pense à Jèrri, la reine des îles!

English lyrics

There's a spot that I love that I ne'er can forget,
Tho' far I may roam 'twill be dear.
For its beauty will linger in memory yet,
Where'er o'er the world I may steer.
Dear Jersey, fair Isle, of the ocean the queen,
Thy charms are so many and rare.
For love finds a home 'mid each beauteous scene,
My heart ever longs to be there.

Beautiful Jersey, gem of the sea,
Ever my heart turns in longing to thee;
Bright are the mem'ries you waken for me,
Beautiful Jersey, gem of the sea.

On thy shores I have wandered in glad days of yore,
With one who is dear to my heart.
And the love-links will bind us as one evermore,
Although for a while we must part.
And oft in my dreams do I see the dear place
The dear little Isle of the sea,
And in fancy I gaze on a sweet loving face,
The face that is dearest to me.

Beautiful Jersey, gem of the sea,
Ever my heart turns in longing to thee;
Bright are the mem'ries you waken for me,
Beautiful Jersey, gem of the sea.

== See also ==
- God Save the King
- Island Home (anthem)
- Ma Normandie
- List of British anthems
