= Music of the Channel Islands =

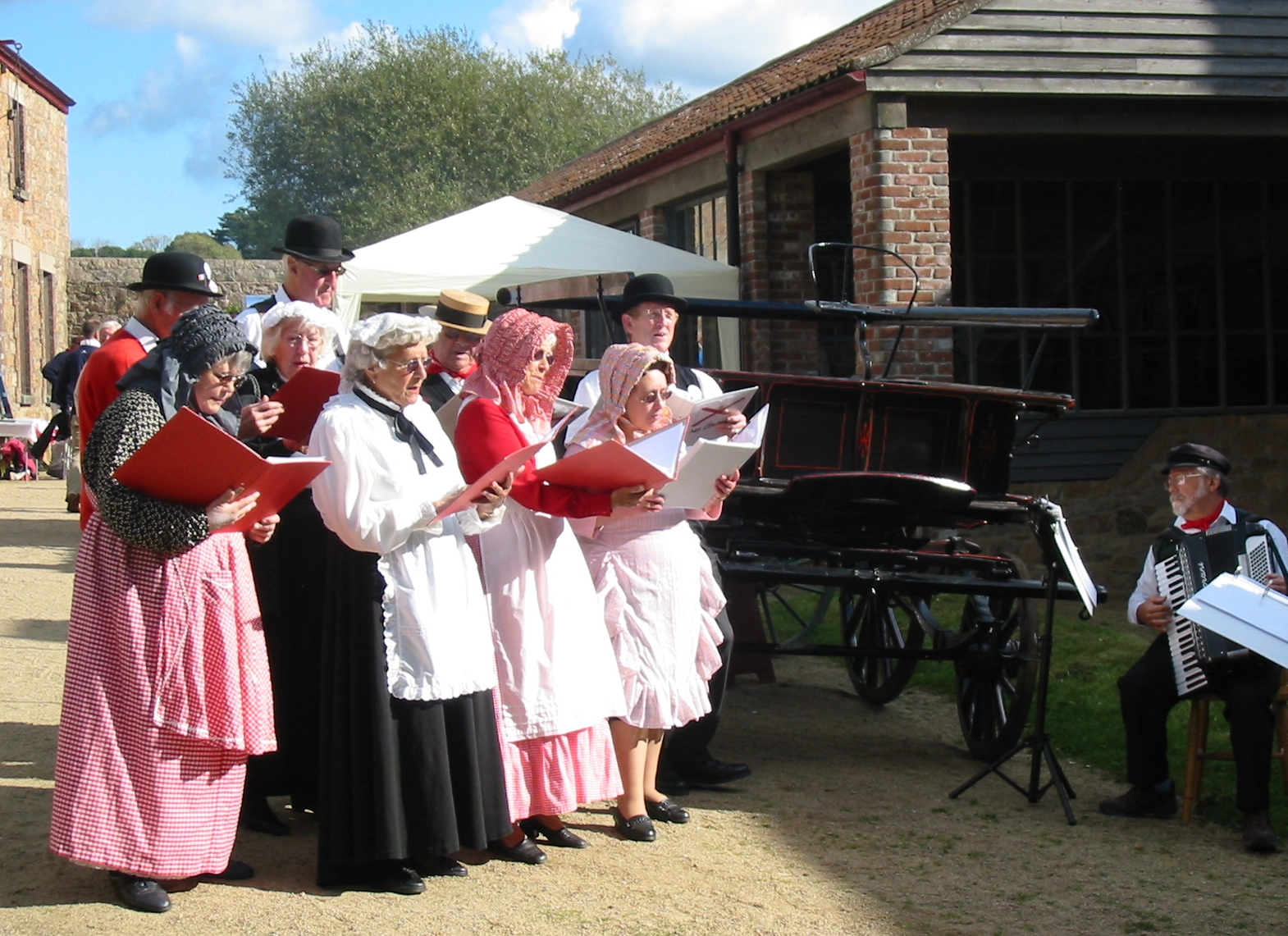
Singing in traditional costume in Jersey at La Faîs'sie d'Cidre

The Channel Islands are located in the English Channel, by Normandy, France. The two bailiwicks, Guernsey and Jersey, are not a part of the United Kingdom, but since the 20th century are majority English-speaking and part of the British cultural sphere. They also share a historic cultural (and musical) identity with the people of Normandy.

Little is known of the history of music in the islands. The Reformation brought Calvinism to the islands and the later strong influence of Methodism suppressed dancing and secular music. A number of traditional songs and dances have been recorded, although some gentrified dances were collected in the 19th century in Guernsey. Some traditional folk songs such as Jean, Gros Jean and J'ai pèrdu ma femme (Jèrriais)/J'ai perdu ma faumme (Dgèrnésiais) have survived. Periodic fieldwork by collectors such as Peter Kennedy (1957; 1960), Claudie Marcel-Dubois (Sark, 1970) and Martin J. Locke (Sark, 1976) revealed a number of folk songs which were mostly in French, with parallels or variants also present in the folk traditions of France and French-speaking Canada. There were a smaller number of songs in Jèrriais, Dgèrnésiais, Sèrtchiais and English. Two songs are unique to the Channel Islands and have not been collected elsewhere: "La Chanson de Peirson" (collected in Jersey by Edouard Gavey) and "Belle, Rendez-Moi Mes Gants" (from the repertoire of Jack Le Feuvre, Sark).

The traditional musical instrument most associated with the islands was the chifournie. According to Edith Carey (1903), it had disappeared from Guernsey by the mid-nineteenth century. It was to disappear from Jersey by the early twentieth century (see Frank Le Maistre: "Dictionnaire jersiais-français", 1976). Fiddle and accordion playing persisted for somewhat longer.

Dances included the "ronde", or round dance, the cotillion, and popular nineteenth-century dances such as the waltz, schottische and polka. "La Danse des Chapieaux" (the hat dance) was a popular game of forfeit, while "La Bérouaisse" (the broom dance) was a display of agility by a solo dancer. "La Bébée" ("the Baby Polka" or "Klatschtanz") is a 19th-century novelty dance which also remains popular with costumed folklore groups in various parts of Europe.

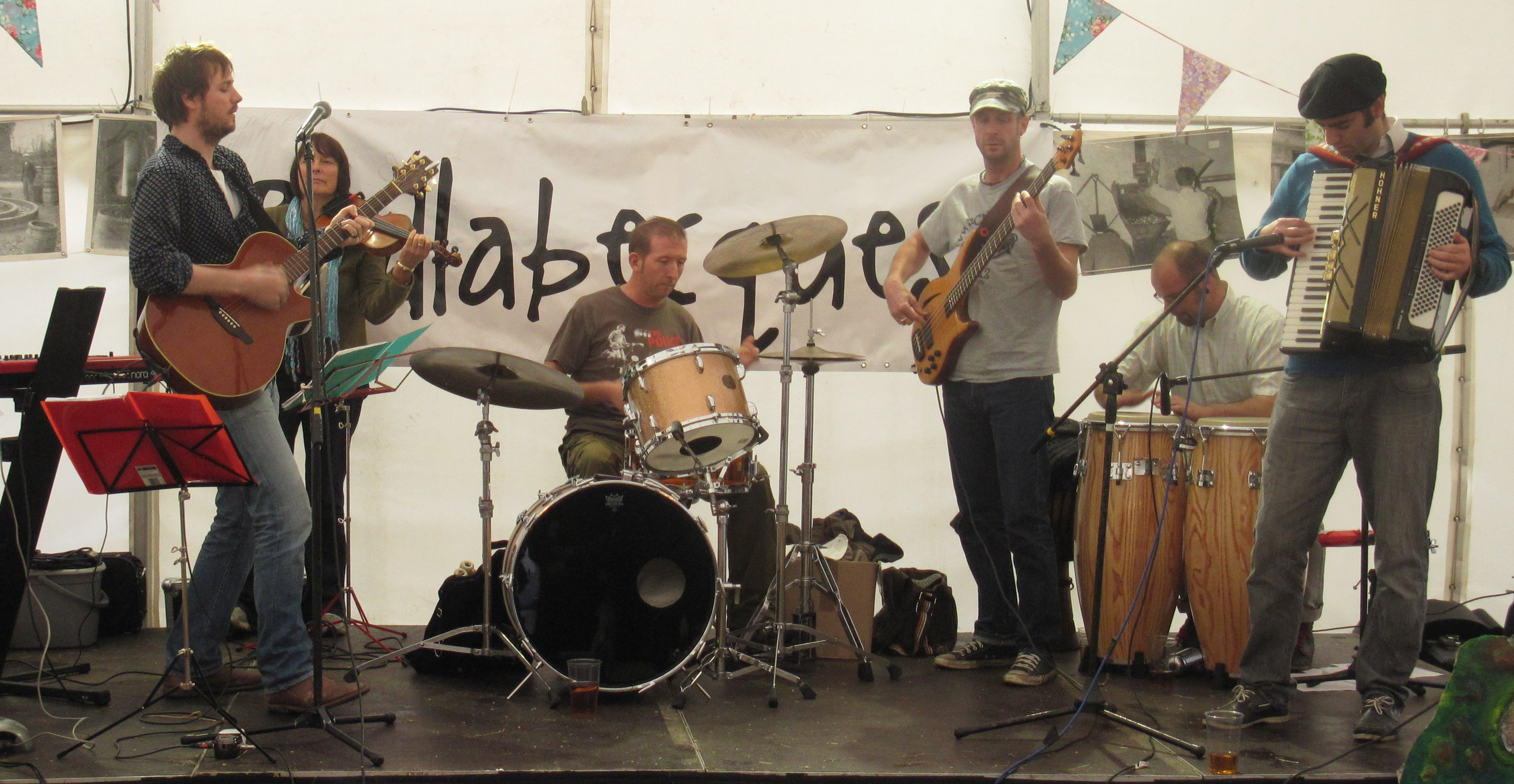
Jèrriais folk-pop group Badlabecques at La Faîs'sie d'Cidre 2012

An identified principle of the Jèrriais song tradition is that it is "inherently and simultaneously eclectic and original", being often borrowed and transformed. Current practice in Jèrriais song is a tradition re-invented through imitation, but historical examples show that adaptations of popular song have been made for hundreds of years. Song in Jèrriais celebrates the language and its survival. Songs derived from French mark geographic identity and proximity to France, while songs derived from the UK and Ireland re-present Jersey's wider heritage.

The development of tourism in the 19th century brought a demand for dance music in tea-rooms and hotels. Some local composers supplied songs and sheet music aimed at a tourist market.

Claude Debussy composed part of La Mer in Jersey. John Ireland settled for a time in Guernsey.

The Channel Islands Music Council was founded in 1974 to promote music in the islands. The Jersey Live Music Festival was held annually from 2004 to 2016.

== See also ==
- Ma Normandie
- Sarnia Cherie
- Jersey Live
- Culture of Jersey
