= RemedySounds =

- Born: Joshua Ross Clark; 19 July 1989 (age 37)
- Origin: Portsmouth, England
- Genres: Dubstep, acoustic,
- Occupation: Singer-songwriter
- Instruments: Vocals, guitar
- Years active: 2011–present
- Label: Unsigned
- Website: facebook.com/RemedySounds

RemedySounds (born 19 July 1989 in Portsmouth, England) is an English dubstep/acoustic musician who makes special use loop pedals to create his sound. In July 2012, he was announced as the runner up of the Acoustic category of Live and Unsigned at the age of 22. In June 2012, he performed alongside Macy Gray at Guernsey Festival in Guernsey.

== Music career ==
=== 2011–2012: Live and Unsigned and MakingMoves ===
In July 2012, RemedySounds was announced as the runner up of the Acoustic Category of Live and Unsigned, placing third overall in the competition. RemedySounds' prizes awarded by Live and Unsigned for his progress in the competition consisted of a Vintage guitar, a festival performance at Bournemouth 7s Festival, a main-stage festival slot at Sundown Festival – sharing a stage with such acts as Chase and Status, Katie B, Tinchy Stryder, Labrinth, Wiley, Chipmunk and Maverick Sabre and a main-stage slot at Guernsey Festival alongside acts including Macy Gray, Kaiser Chiefs and many more.

In July 2012 RemedySounds was invited to Born in a Barn studios to record his debut E.P MakingMoves with producer Roger Greasby and his partner Tony White after meeting at the Live and Unsigned Grand Final after party. On 3 August Remedy tweeted thanking Roger and Tony for their efforts on MakingMoves and MakingMoves was released on iTunes on 2 September 2012 and by 5 September 2012 the E.P had reached 7th in the iTunes Singer-Songwriter weekly album chart – surpassing Ed Sheeran and Frank Turner.

On 22 November 2012 RemedySounds uploaded a video response to Taylor Swift's hit single We Are Never Ever Getting Back Together. Overnight the video received circa 1,300 views and positive reviews across Twitter and YouTube

== Discography ==
=== Albums ===
Title	Album details
MakingMoves	Released: 2 September 2012; Label: Independent; Formats: CD, digital download

== Music videos ==
Year	Title	Director	Funded by
2012	"We Are Never Ever Getting Back Together"	Damien Reeves (Melmo Films)	Live and Unsigned
