= Indira Allegra =

American artist and writer

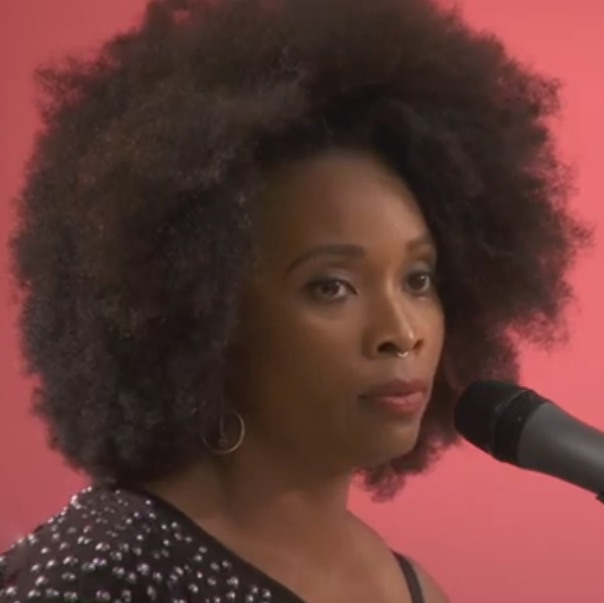
- Reading at the San Francisco Public Library in 2014
- Born: c. 1980; Detroit, Michigan, United States
- Education: California College of the Arts (BA)
- Known for: Performative craft, poetry, dance, weaving, sculpture, assemblage, installation art
- Notable work: Bodywarp; Blackout
- Awards: United States Artists Award; 2022 Burke Prize; 2019 Joseph Henry Jackson Literary Award; 2014
- Website: indiraallegra.com

Indira Allegra (born c. 1980) is a multidisciplinary American artist and writer based in Oakland, California.

== Background and education ==
Allegra was born in Detroit, and moved to Portland, Oregon in the 1980s. Allegra studied biology at Yale University in the late 1990s but left and later completed an Associate of Applied Science degree in Sign Language Interpretation from Portland Community College in 2005 and a Bachelor of Fine Arts degree from the California College of the Arts in 2015. Allegra has worked as a sign language interpreter, domestic violence advocate, union organizer, teaching artist, and in the service industry.

Allegra self-identifies as a "woman of Cherokee, African and Irish descent." Her mother's family comes from Georgia and Mississippi. Allegra has said that her mother's family is "Black— descendants of mixed tribal origin from peoples along the west coast of Africa who were forced into chattel slavery on Cherokee, Chicasaw, Choctaw, Creek, Seminole, and Natchez land." She has said that her father's family is of Black, Native American, and European heritage, stating that they descended "from Cherokees living in Athens, Georgia and Bessemer City, North Carolina (two hours outside of Cherokee, NC)—they survived by mixing with non-Indians and learning how to assimilate into a growing, dominant white culture. My father's people also come from African descendant foremothers raped by Irishmen while working on plantations and caring for white children in white homes."

== Art and awards ==
An African American artist, Allegra makes work concerned with memorial and social tension. They work in a variety of genres and media, including performative craft, poetry, dance, weaving, sculpture, assemblage, and site-specific installations. Their work has been featured in exhibitions at the Museum of Arts and Design, The University of Chicago's Arts Incubator, John Michael Kohler Arts Center, Yerba Buena Center for the Arts, Mills College Art Museum, Museum of the African Diaspora, and SOMArts. They have been awarded the United States Artists Award (2022), YBCA 100 Honoree (2020), Minnesota Street Project's California Black Voices Project Grant (2020), the Museum of Arts and Design's Burke Prize (2019). the Fleishhacker Foundation's Eureka Fellowship (2019), the Artadia Award (2018), the Mike Kelley Foundation Artist Project Grant (2018), the MAP Fund (2018), the Tosa Studio Award (2018), the Windgate Craft Fellowship (2015), and the San Francisco Foundation's Joseph Henry Jackson Literary Award (2014).

== Selected exhibitions ==
- 2016 Blackout, YBCA, San Francisco, California
- 2018 Art+Practice+Ideas, Mills College Art Museum, Oakland, California
- 2018 Bodywarp, Museum of the African Diaspora, San Francisco, California
- 2019 Burke Prize Exhibition, Museum of Arts and Design, New York, New York
- 2019 Even Thread [has] a Speech, John Michael Kohler Arts Center, Sheboygan, Wisconsin
- 2022 Texere: The Shape of Loss is A Tapestry, Minnesota Street Project, San Francisco, California
- 2023 Disrupt and Resist, Mason Exhibitions Center in Arlington, VA.

== Writing ==
Allegra published Blackout with Sming Sming Books in 2017. Their writing has appeared in American Craft, Art Journal, Foglifter Magazine, Cream City Review and Wordgathering: A Journal of Disability Poetry. Their work has been anthologized in Dear Sister, Red Indian Road West: Native American Poetry from California and Sovereign Erotics: A Collection of Two-Spirit Literature among others.

== See also ==
- Jennifer White-Johnson
- Finnegan Shannon
