= Jersey Folklore Festival =

Jersey music festival held in 2012

- Genre: Folk music, rock, comedy
- Dates: 30 June, 1 July 2012 (weekend)
- Locations: Jersey, Channel Islands
- Years active: 2012
- Website: http://www.folklorejersey.org.uk/

Jersey Folklore Festival is a music festival held in Saint Helier, Jersey. The venue is People's Park, with a possible capacity of 5,000 people, and two stages. A main stage situated inside a large marquee, and the smaller Agapanthus Stage which is named after the Agapanthus flowers which grow in the park.

== History ==
The plan for this festival was announced after a different annual Jersey folk music festival called Grassroots came to an end, due to financial issues.

The 2013 festival was cancelled due to a lack of funding from Jersey's Tourism Development Fund and timing of permission to hold the event in St Peter.

== 2012 ==
The 2012 event took place on 30 June to 1 July. 2,000 people attended over the weekend. The following acts performed on two stages;

=== Main Stage ===
- Van Morrison Saturday night headliner
- Ray Davies Sunday night headline act
- Joan Armatrading
- Nouvelle Vague
- Lee "Scratch" Perry
- Rodriguez
- Badly Drawn Boy
- Finley Quaye
- Wanda Jackson
- Jake Bugg
- Lloyd Yates

=== Agapanthus Stage ===
- John Cooper Clarke
- John Shuttleworth
- Edward Aczel
- Stanley Forbes
- The Recks
- Ashiki
- Rick Jones (musician)
- Frankie Davies (musician)
- Badlabecques (folk band performing in Jèrriais)
- BBC Radio Jersey Live Show

== See also ==
- Jersey Live
