= Zombie Zombie (band) =

French electro-pop duo

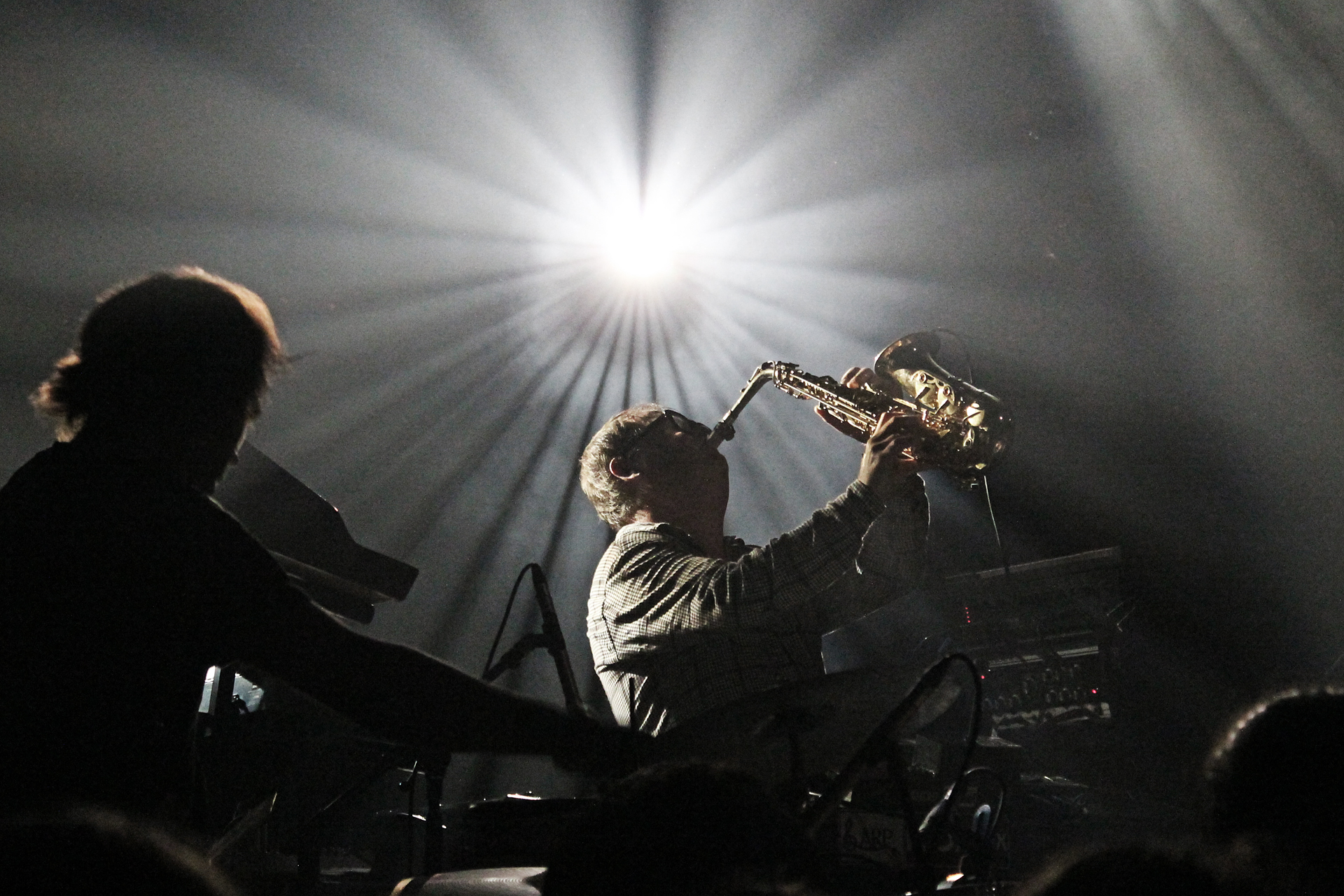
- Zombie Zombie - Le Circuit, Le Confort Moderne, Poitiers (2012-10-13 by Xi WEG)

Background information
- Genres: Electro, psychedelic, experimental, Japanese classic music
- Years active: 2007–present
- Labels: Versatile
- Members: Etienne Jaumet, Cosmic Neman
- Website: www.myspace.com/therealzombiezombie

Zombie Zombie are a French electropop duo. Their work includes re-interpretations of the music of John Carpenter and Sun Ra. Their performances include classic electronic instruments such as the Theremin.

Zombie Zombie performed a live soundtrack to Battleship Potemkin open air on the back of a tug boat in the Jersey Harbour as part of the Branchage Film Festival in September 2010.

== Air time ==
The band have been played by Gideon Coe, Tom Ravenscroft, Joe Cornish and Iggy Pop on BBC 6 Music.
