= Attilio di Fabrizio =

Italian chef

- Born: Abruzzi, Italy
- Occupation: Chef
- Years active: 1975–present
- Employer(s): Belmond Villa San Michele; Hotel Splendido

Attilio Di Fabrizio, chef de cuisine for both the Villa San Michele in Florence and the Hotel Splendido in Portofino, was born in the town of Abruzzi. He studied at the Villa Santa Cookery School, cradle of many of Italy's most outstanding chefs. Di Fabrizio followed formal training with apprenticeships in Italy, France, Great Britain, and Switzerland, developing his skills and broadening his knowledge, before returning to Italy to the world-famous Hotel Cipriani in Venice.

From 1975 through 1983, Di Fabrizio worked the Americas, then returned to Italy to the prestigious Enoteca Pinchiorri in Florence. In 1984 he joined the Hotel Splendido, and in 1997 added Villa San Michele to his responsibilities. Both the Hotel Splendido and Villa San Michele are Orient-Express Hotels properties, part of a collection of luxury hotels, trains, and cruises around the world.

Attilio Di Fabrizio participated in the Great Chefs television series.
