= Renato Piccolotto =

Italian chef

- Born: 1954; Asolo, Italy
- Died: 19-08-2026
- Culinary career
- Cooking style: Italian cuisine
- Current restaurant: Hotel Cipriani
- Website: www.piccolotto.com

Renato Piccolotto is an internationally renowned Italian chef who was born in Asolo (Province of Treviso) in 1954 and is the Executive Chef of the Hotel Cipriani in Venice where he started working in 1983.

In the recent years he has been the head chef for the events of Elton John for the "Elton John AIDS Foundation" that is set during the Academy Award ceremony.
