= Frédéric Bérat =

French composer and songwriter

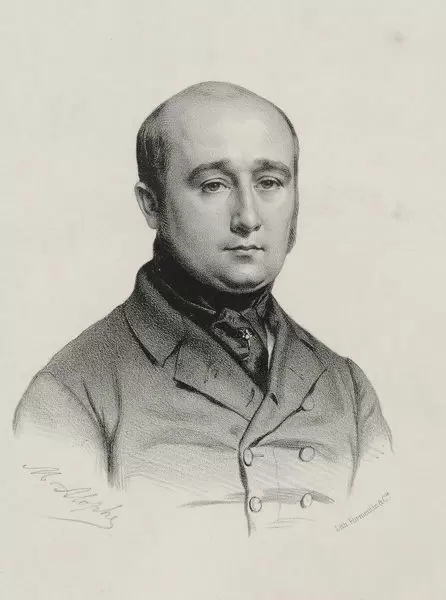
Frédéric Bérat (c.1850), by Marie-Alexandre Alophe

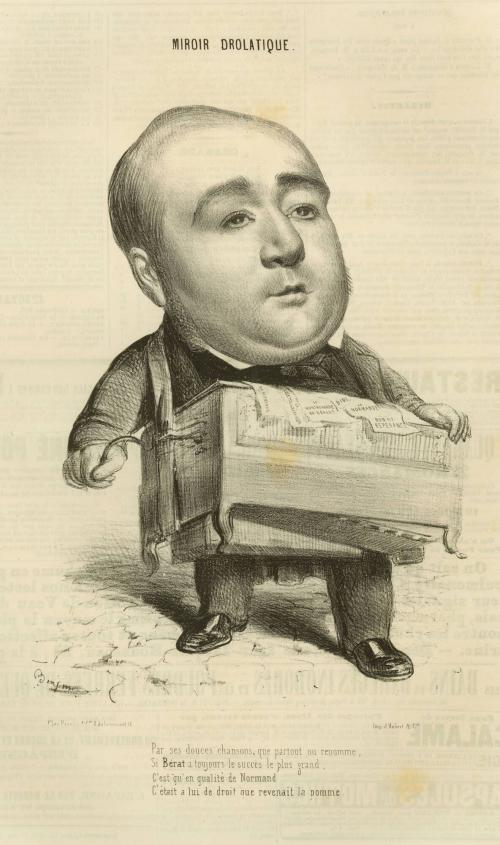
A caricature of Bérat by Benjamin Roubaud

Frédéric Bérat (11 March 1801, Rouen – 2 December 1855, Paris) was a French composer, chansonnier and goguettier. His best known song is Ma Normandie, the official anthem of the Bailiwick of Jersey.

== Biography ==
He was the sixth of seven children born to Jean Charles Bérat, a wealthy trader in leather and oils. His older brother, Eustache Bérat, began as a designer, but also became a chansonnier.

It was intended that Frédéric would take over the family business. While studying at a local preparatory school, he also began taking clarinet lessons from a private teacher. When his studies were completed, he went to Paris, where he found employment with Chevreux-Aubertot, a large trader in textiles. During his years there, he taught himself how to play the piano.

Soon he was seeking advice from Charles-Henri Plantade, concerning composition and harmony, and began writing songs that he performed for a close circle of friends. As he felt more confident, he started to attend meetings of the "Goguette de la Lice chansonnière". He ended by quitting his job to become a singer. Pierre-Jean de Béranger, the songwriter, became his close friend and worked to promote his career.

He wrote several successful songs during the 1840s, but his best known is one of his first: Ma Normandie (1836), which was adopted as an anthem by Jersey and is still a regional favorite in Normandy. More than a million copies were printed during his lifetime, and it continues to be reissued periodically.

He was interred at the Cimetière du Père-Lachaise. A street and a plaza in Rouen have been named after him. In 1905, a monument dedicated to him and his brother Eustache was erected in Rouen's Square Verdrel. It was designed by Alphonse Guilloux.
