= The Graveltones =

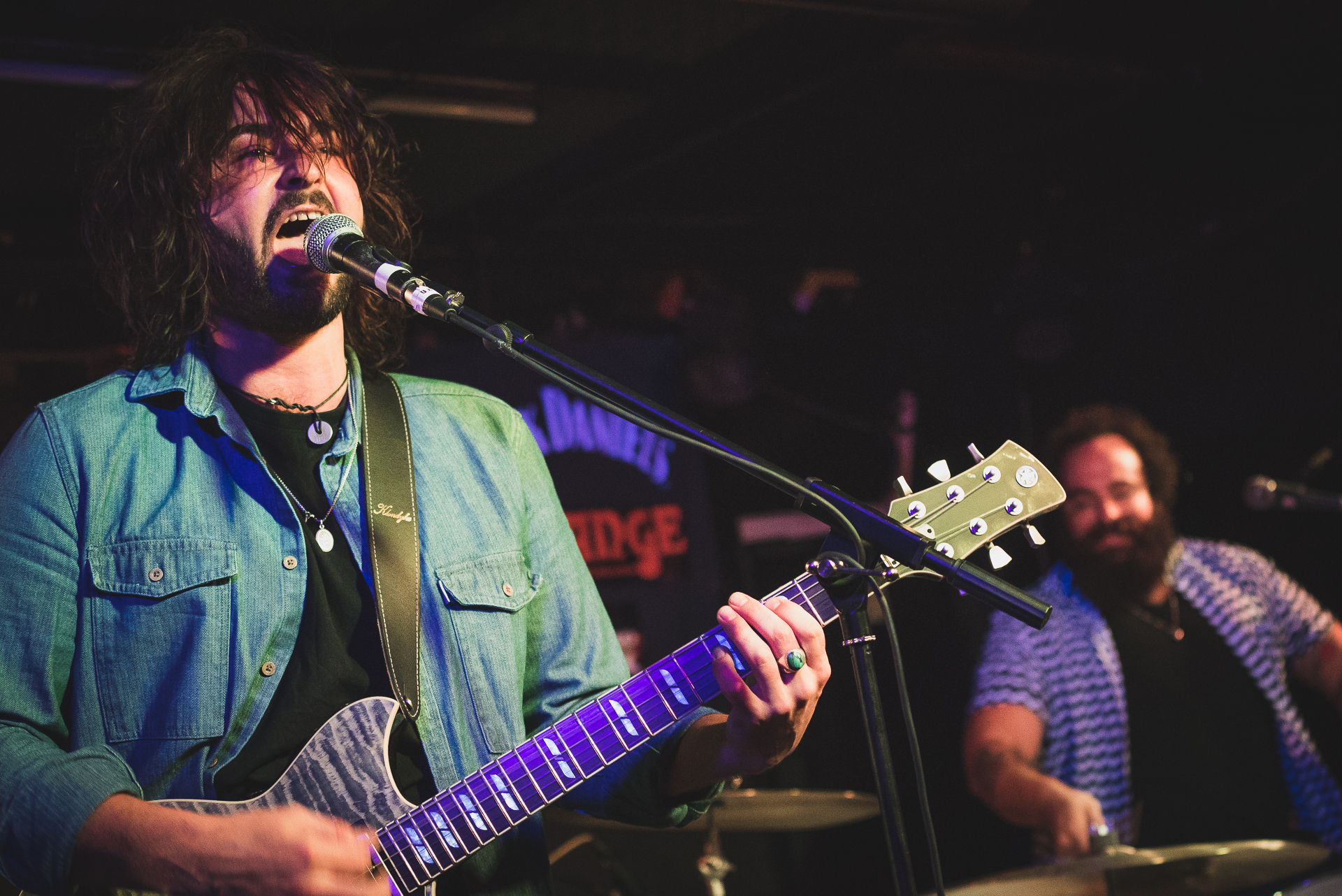

Background information
- Origin: London
- Genres: Hard rock, blues rock, rock and roll
- Years active: 2011–present
- Members: Jimmy O Mikey Sorbello
- Website: www.thegraveltones.com

The Graveltones are a two-piece heavy blues rock and roll band consisting of members Jimmy O (guitar/vocals) and Mikey Sorbello (drums). The band are currently based in London. The Graveltones are influenced by artists such as Captain Beefheart, John Lee Hooker and Queens Of The Stone Age.

== History ==
The Graveltones formed in London in 2011 after two Australians, Jimmy O (vocals and guitar) and Mikey Sorbello (drums and noises) met in London's Tin Pan Alley. Three days after meeting in a studio for a jam they played their first gig at the 100 Club in London, in February 2011. The duo recorded a five track self-titled debut EP within the space of two days over August 2011 at London's Miloco Studios by producer Sean Douglas (Wire) and was released in October 2011 in digital format on the band's official website and iTunes. London's Grapevine Music named the EP "My pick for a Christmas stocking filler".

In February 2012, they returned to their homeland for a headline tour of Australia where they played venues such as The Tote Hotel, Cherry Bar and Black Bear Lodge. On 21 May 2012, the band released a studio single titled "I Want Your Love", which was available as a free download on their official website. The single was used by Irish Lotto for their advertising campaign featuring ‘Happy Tony’ dancing to the track in the street outside a betting shop. In August 2012, they started a UK and European tour. This tour saw them play Standon Calling and headline Rotherhithe Festival in aid of Teenage Cancer Trust.

Since forming in 2011, The Graveltones have played over 250 gigs. In April 2013, The Graveltones went on tour as a support act for Rival Sons on their European tour starting 9 April at London's Shepherd's Bush Empire. Off the back of that tour, the band announced that they would be performing on the Jägermeister Acoustic Stage at Download Festival.

== Don't Wait Down ==
In May 2013, the band announced that they had been recording material for their debut album at the Monnow Valley Studios. The first single released from the album being "Catch Me On The Fly", which received airplay from radio stations such as Team Rock Radio. In August 2013, the band saw themselves nominated for the 'Best New Band' award at the Classic Rock Awards. Following this, the band also announced that they had signed to internationally renowned booking agency, TKO. In September 2013, The Graveltones embarked on a tour with The Temperance Movement as the main support act for their UK shows. In October of the same year, the band announced that they had been confirmed as support for The BossHoss on a 13-date arena tour of Germany, Switzerland, and Austria. During this time, the band's debut album Don't Wait Down was released exclusively to pledgers, with the album set to be available internationally on 21 October. Distribution for the album will be through RSK Entertainment.

== Headline tour (2014) ==
In February and March 2014, The Graveltones played a short run of UK shows in Birmingham, Chester and London co-headlined by themselves and The Cadillac Three with support from Buffalo Summer. In addition to those shows, the band embarked on a 16 date headline tour across Germany through April with Buffalo Summer as support once again. Furthermore, the band were invited to be a part of Download Festival in 2014, playing The Pepsi Max Stage on the Sunday. After completing the European Festival circuit in Summer 2014, The Graveltones set out on a full headline tour of the UK with support coming from Tax The Heat and Aaron Keylock on alternating dates. The tour was further extended into Europe also, with multiple headline shows including a first-ever show in France as well as a small number of shows in support of The BossHoss once again. In September, the band were announced as part of the soundtrack for the then upcoming NHL15 release. The song featured in the game was "Forget About The Trouble". The band also supported Canadian stoner-rock band Monster Truck for three shows during November in Oxford, London and Sheffield.

== Love Lies Dying–present ==
In late 2014, The Graveltones announced that they were in the process of rehearsing new songs for the recording of their upcoming album. In January 2015, pictures were shown on their Facebook page of them in the studio recording that album alongside producer Jamie Gomez at Orgone Studios in London. During this time, the band also announced that the title of their second studio album will be Love Lies Dying. Since then, both the band and Classic Rock magazine have stated that the album will be available globally from 1 June 2015, with digital pre-orders to be received 31 May, with the release coming via Lagoon Dog Records.

== Discography ==
- The Graveltones EP (2012)
- Limited Collection EP (2013)

=== Studio albums ===
- Don't Wait Down (2013)
- Love Lies Dying (2015)

== Members ==
- Jimmy O - Vocals/Guitars
- Mikey Sorbello - Drums
