= Belmond Hotel Splendido =

Hotel in Portofino, Italy

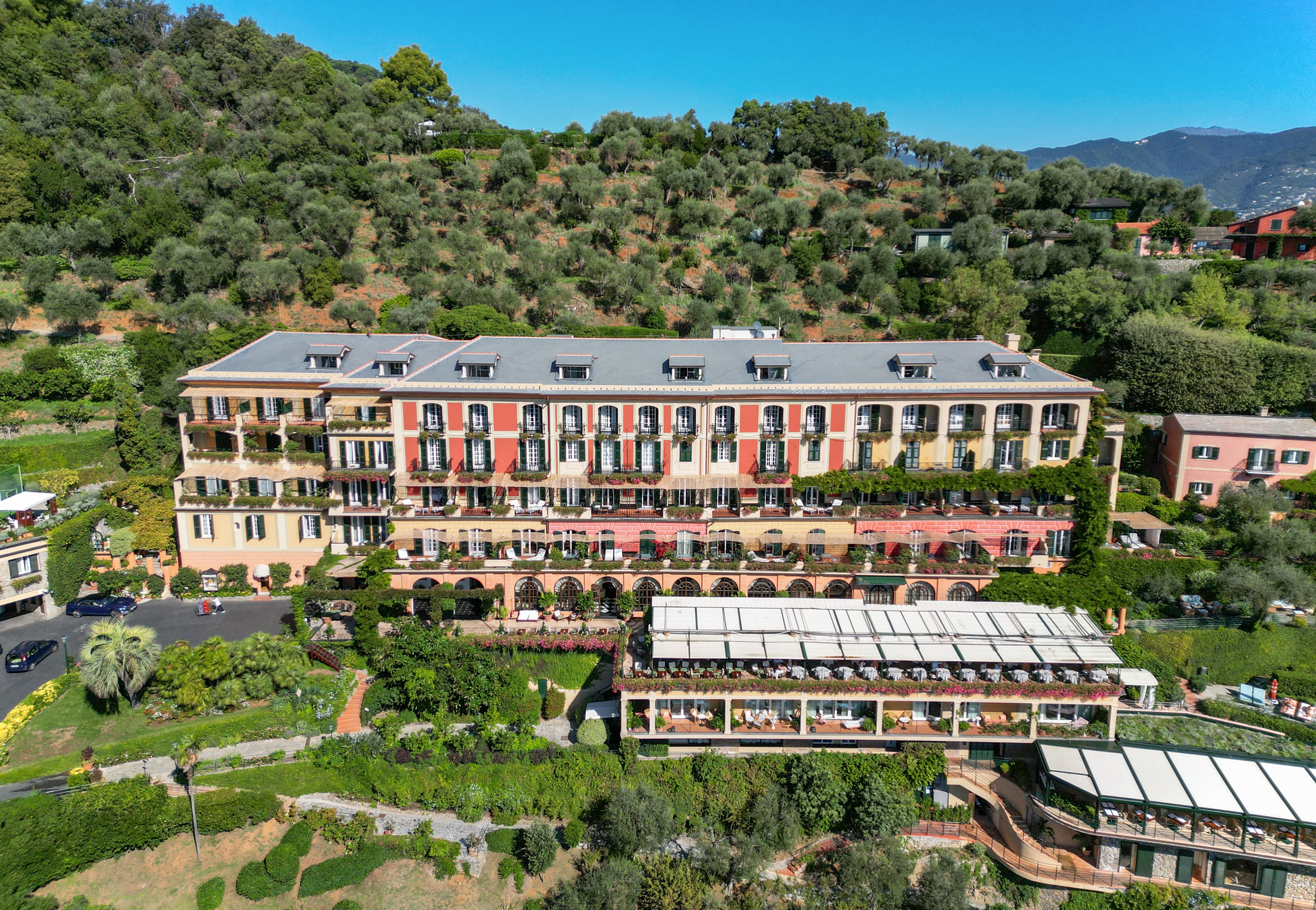
- Interactive map of the Belmond Hotel Splendido area

General information
- Location: Salita Baratta 16, 16034 Portofino, Italy
- Coordinates: 44.303303840049196°N 9.209230404654202°E
- Owner: Belmond
- Operator: Belmond Ltd.

Technical details
- Floor count: 5

Other information
- Number of rooms: 53
- Number of restaurants: 2
- Parking: Yes

Website
- belmond.com/hotelsplendido

The Belmond Hotel Splendido is a hotel in Portofino, Italy. The site was formerly home to a Benedictine monastery which was ransacked so many times by Saracen pirates that the monks abandoned it in the 16th century. The four-storey high building subsequently fell into disrepair. In the 19th century the property was purchased by Italian aristocrat Baron Baratta, who renovated and converted it into a family summer house. In 1901 the building was purchased by Ruggero Valentini who transformed it into a hotel which opened in 1902. Since its inception, the hotel has played host to various famous people and noble families. The 1950s witnessed the discovery of Portofino by American visitors who made the hotel their accommodation of choice. Among the visitors from this time to the present have been the Duke of Windsor, Winston Churchill and Rex Harrison. In 1952, Clark Gable in 1953, Humphrey Bogart, Lauren Bacall, Groucho Marx and Ava Gardner in 1954, Fredric March in 1955, Elizabeth Taylor and Richard Burton in 1967. Christopher Plummer in 1971. Italian President of Republic Giuseppe Saragat in 1971. The whole Families of Counts Agusta in 1965. Valentina Cortese 1965.

In 1986 Orient-Express Hotels bought the hotel.

Orient-Express Hotels Ltd. purchased an existing building on the piazzetta in Portofino which had originally been the village's first osteria and after conversion opened it in 1998 as the Splendido Mare which offers 16 rooms and suites, most with a balcony or terrace. On the ground floor is the Chuflay Bar and Restaurant.

In 2014, Hotel Splendido was renamed Belmond Hotel Splendido as part of the rebrand of Orient-Express Hotels Ltd.
