= Four Seasons Hotel (Prague) =

Four Seasons Hotel Prague

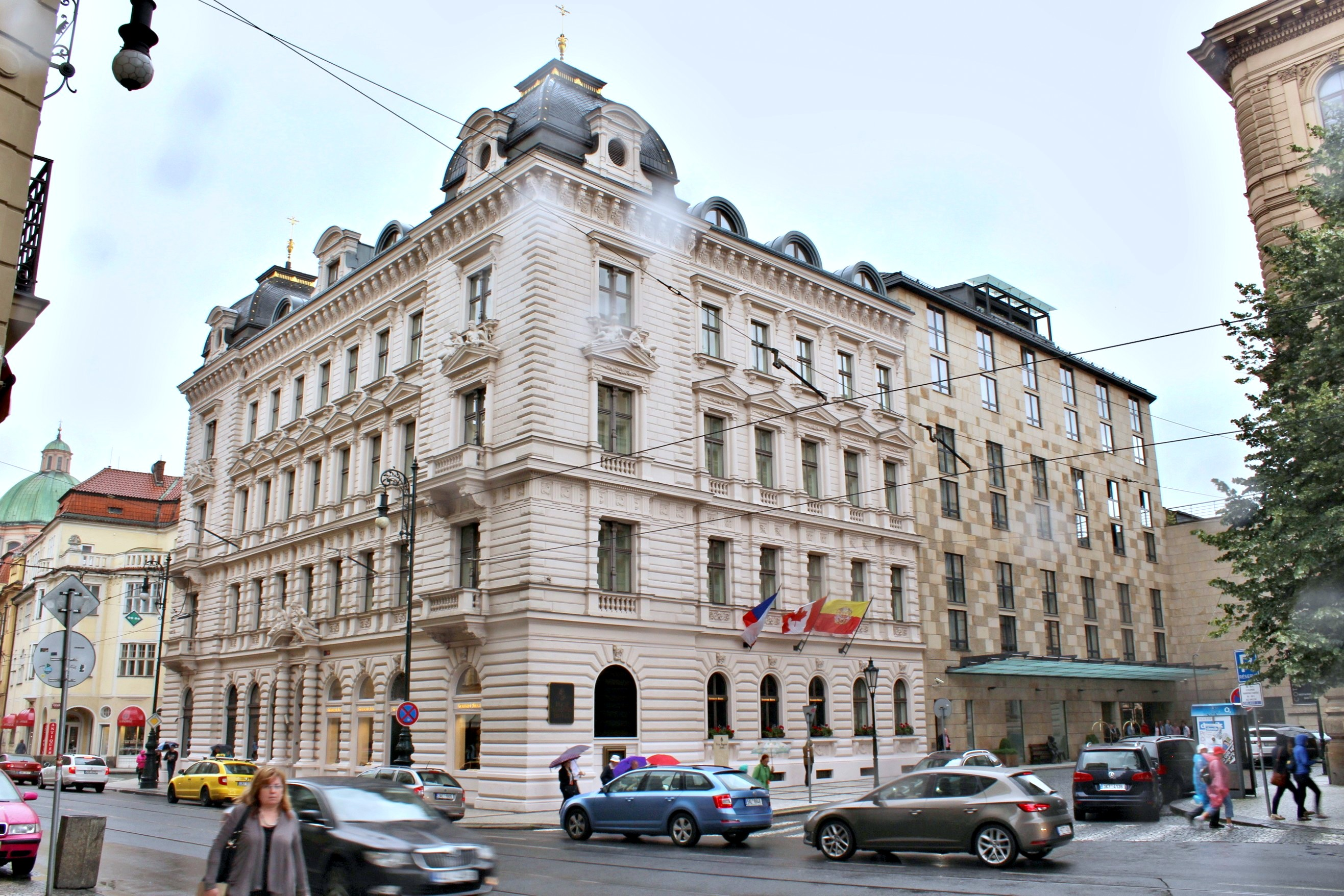
- Hotel chain: Four Seasons Hotels and Resorts

General information
- Location: Veleslavínova 2a/1098, Prague, Czech Republic
- Coordinates: 50°5′15.5″N 14°24′54.2″E
- Opened: 2001
- Owner: PPF

Other information
- Number of rooms: 141
- Number of suites: 20

Website
- www.fourseasons.com/prague/

The Four Seasons Hotel Prague is a luxury hotel in the Old Town of Prague, Czech Republic, on the Vltava riverfront near Charles Bridge. Operated by Four Seasons Hotels and Resorts, it opened on 9 February 2001. The five-star hotel has 157 rooms, including 19 suites, and holds a Five-Star rating from Forbes Travel Guide.

The hotel complex combines historic Baroque, Neoclassical and Neo-Renaissance buildings with contemporary construction. Its redevelopment was designed by the Prague architectural studio Dům a Město, which won an architectural competition for the project in 1996. The completed project received a MIPIM Award in the Hotels and Tourism category in 2001.

== History ==
Plans for the hotel developed during the 1990s. The Prague architectural studio Dům a Město won a competition for the project in 1996. Design work began the following year, construction started in 1998, and the hotel opened on 9 February 2001.

The hotel was heavily affected by the 2002 European floods, which flooded its underground levels and forced the evacuation of all guests. The guestrooms and main public areas remained largely unaffected, but damage to technical and service facilities led to a lengthy closure. It reopened on 20 June 2003.

Northwood Investors acquired the hotel in 2014 and owned it until 2025. In 2025, the property was acquired by a group led by PPF Real Estate, with Noble Hospitality taking a minority stake.

== Facilities and reception ==
The hotel has 138 rooms and 19 suites. Its main restaurant, CottoCrudo, serves Italian cuisine, while the AVA Spa is located in the hotel's Neoclassical building. The spa's interior was designed by French interior designer Pierre-Yves Rochon and draws on elements of the hotel's historic architecture.

In 2026, Forbes Travel Guide awarded the hotel its Five-Star rating for the seventh consecutive year. It remained the only hotel in the Czech Republic with the guide's highest rating, while AVA Spa received a Four-Star rating.

== Architecture ==
The hotel incorporates historic Baroque, Neoclassical and Neo-Renaissance buildings alongside contemporary additions. The older structures date from the 16th, 17th and 19th centuries and were restored as part of the development. Their varied architectural styles give the complex a layered appearance reflecting several periods of Prague's architectural history.

The project was designed by the Prague architectural studio Dům a Město, and involved architects Vítězslava Rothbauerová and Jiří Hůrka.

Architectural historians regarded the building as a successful contribution to the Old Town riverfront.
