= Nakadia =

Thai-German DJ and producer

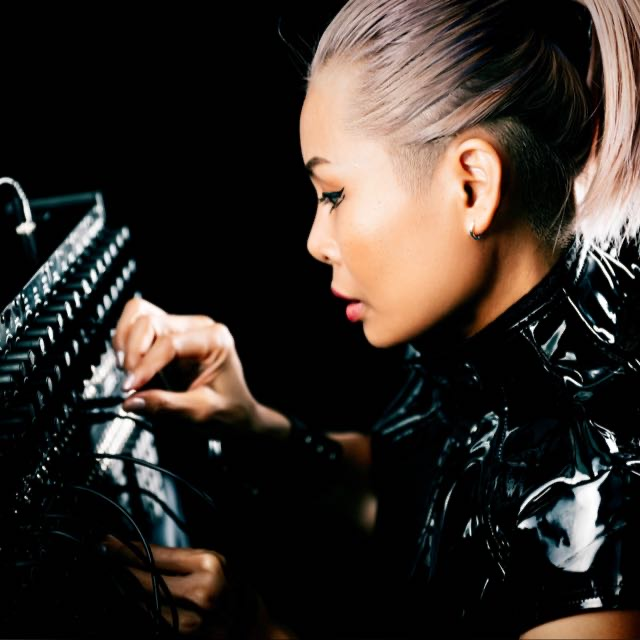

Background information
- Born: Seephrai Mungphanklang; December 30, 1980 (age 45); Khon Buri, Nakhon Ratchasima, Thailand
- Origin: Khon Buri, Thailand
- Genres: Deep house; tech house; minimal house; techno
- Occupations: DJ; producer
- Instruments: Turntables; digital audio workstation
- Years active: 2002—present

Seephrai Mungphanklang (Thai: สีไพร มุ่งพันธ์กลาง, RTGS: Siphrai Mungphanklang; born 30 December 1980), better known by her stage name Nakadia, is a Thai DJ and producer based in Berlin, Germany.

== Early life and career ==
Nakadia was born as a farmer's daughter in Khon Buri, Thailand as the youngest of five. She grew up without electricity or running water and was often left alone for weeks when her family took jobs as migrant workers, leaving her only 300 baht to survive. At the age of fifteen, Nakadia moved to Khorat where she shared a small apartment with five other girls, working at several factories. Two years later, she started working at a local shopping mall and later at an internet cafe, where she made online friends with a German man named Seb (who eventually became her manager). He invited her for a first visit to Europe, where he took her to a techno club. This was the night she fell in love with this music and decided to become a DJ.

After one year of practice, Nakadia began her career as disc jockey in 2003. Already by 2005, Nakadia toured over 100 gigs around the world, from São Paulo, Brazil - where she performed at Club Manga Rosa - across all of Europe, all the way to Hong Kong and Seoul. During the first 17 years of her career, Nakadia performed over 1600 times across 76 countries at prestigious clubs such as Ushuaïa Ibiza, Amnesia Ibiza, Stereo Montreal D'Edge São Paulo, Cafe D'Anvers in Antwerp Belgium, Watergate, Sisyphos and Tresor in Berlin Germany, De Marktkantine and Westerunie in Amsterdam Netherlands- just to name a few. She also was booked to major festivals such as Loveparade Tomorrowland Festival, SonneMondSterne und Sterne, Parookaville, Epizode Festival or Rainbow Serpent in Australia.

As producer Nakadia is famous for her percussive grooves and powerful beats, with releases on Labels such as Carl Cox's Intec, Filth on Acid, Set About or Codex.

In 2018, Nakadia made her debut at Tomorrowland Belgium. She later... performed at Tomorrowland Winter in Alpe d'Huez, France, in 2022. Other notable appearances include Rave The Planet in Berlin in 2023 and UNVRS Ibiza as part of Carl Cox's Sunday residency in 2026. She is also scheduled to perform at Tomorrowland Thailand and EDC Thailand in December 2026.
