= Ma Normandie =

1836–2025 regional anthem of Jersey

English: My Normandy
- Regional anthem of Jersey
- Lyrics: Frédéric Bérat
- Music: Frédéric Bérat
- Adopted: 1836
- Relinquished: 2025

"Ma Normandie" was the official regional anthem of the Bailiwick of Jersey, a British Crown dependency in the Channel Islands, and was written and composed by Frédéric Bérat. Jersey is historically part of the Duchy of Normandy, and French has been for centuries an official administrative language of Jersey, whose inhabitants have traditionally spoken a variety of Norman language.

Although "Ma Normandie" is used by Jersey at Commonwealth Games, Island Games and other international events where it is necessary for territories that otherwise use "God Save the King" to be distinguished, the fact that the song refers to France rather than to Jersey means that a body of opinion has campaigned for a change of anthem.

In 2007 the States of Jersey undertook to find a new, official, Anthem by means of an open competition. The final judging of the competition took place with a public performance of the short-listed pieces on 30 April 2008. The short-listed composers were: Derek Lawrence, Gerard Le Feuvre, James Taberner and a joint composition by Kevin Porée and Matheson Bayley; the traditional song "Beautiful Jersey"/"Man Bieau P'tit Jèrri" was also included in the shortlist. The winner of the competition was declared to be "Island Home" composed by Gerard Le Feuvre. A Jèrriais version of the English lyrics will be provided. The States never ratified Island Home and instead adopted Beautiful Jersey as the local anthem in 2025.

"Ma Normandie" is also widely used, but unofficially, as the regional anthem of Normandy.

The song was translated into Armenian by Mkrtich Beshiktashlian under the title "Erg hayreni" ("A song of the homeland"). This translation inspired Nahapet Rusinian during the Zeytun uprising in 1862 to write his famous poem "Kilikia" ("Cilicia") in support of the liberation movement of Western Armenia. Gabriel Yeranyan set "Cilicia" to music, which is a popular song among Armenians.

== Lyrics ==
French original

I
Quand tout renaît à l'espérance,
Et que l'hiver fuit loin de nous,
Sous le beau ciel de notre France,
Quand le soleil revient plus doux,
Quand la nature est reverdie,
Quand l'hirondelle est de retour,
J'aime à revoir ma Normandie,
C'est le pays qui m'a donné le jour.

II
J'ai vu les champs de l'Helvétie,
Et ses chalets et ses glaciers,
J'ai vu le ciel de l'Italie,
Et Venise et ses gondeliers.
En saluant chaque patrie,
Je me disais : « Aucun séjour
N'est plus beau que ma Normandie,
C'est le pays qui m'a donné le jour.»

III
Il est un âge dans la vie,
Où chaque rêve doit finir,
Un âge où l'âme recueillie
A besoin de se souvenir.
Lorsque ma muse refroidie
Vers le passé fera retour, (Note: Sometimes written Aura fini ses chants d'amour ("Will have finished its songs of love"), especially in older publications.)
J'irai revoir ma Normandie,
C'est le pays qui m'a donné le jour.

English translation

I
When everything is reborn in hope
And winter flees far from us,
Under the beautiful sky of our France,
When the sun returns gentler,
When nature has turned green again,
When the swallow has returned,
I like to see again my Normandy,
It's the country where I was born.

II
I’ve seen the fields of Helvetia,
And its chalets and its glaciers,
I’ve seen the sky of Italy,
And Venice and its gondoliers.
Greeting each homeland,
I told myself that no stay
Is finer than my Normandy,
It's the country where I was born.

III
There comes a time of life,
When every dream must end,
A time when the restful soul
Needs to remember.
When my chilled muse
Makes its way back to the past,
I’ll go see again my Normandy,
It's the country where I was born.
