= Benny the Chef =

Italian chef and author

- Born: Benedetto D'Epiro; 26 April 1977 (age 48)

Benedetto D'Epiro (born 26 April 1977 in Rome), better known as “Benny the Chef!”, is an Italian chef, culinary teacher, book author, awards winner, television personality and entertainer.

== Career ==
A former Rugby player, he graduated in 1996 at the top of his class from IPSSAR, Culinary Institute of Rome. His career began in 1996 when he became chef of Ristorante Barberini in Rome. At age 19, he was the youngest Head Chef in Italy, probably in Europe.

In 2008 he wrote his first book "La Cucina Secondo Me! Ricette, Storie e Filosofia di Benny the Chef" (Herald Editore). The book won the Gourmand World Cookbook Award Best First Cookbook in Italy and 2nd Best First Cookbook in the World.

In 2010 he published his second cookbook "The Art of Cooking According to Me", a book full of recipes, interesting stories about the culinary arts, and with the foreword written by the famous Malaysian celebrity chef, Chef Wan.

Benny was one of the celebrity chefs who appeared in season 5 of the popular cooking show "Real Food" and at Paris Cookbook Fair 2011. At the Anime Awards 2024 Ceremony in Tokyo, Japan, Chef Benny participated as one of the video testimonials for the event.
