= Jennifer White-Johnson =

American artist and activist

- Born: Washington, D.C., United States
- Education: University of Maryland, Baltimore County (BA)
- Years active: 2017-present
- Children: 1 son

Jennifer White-Johnson is an American artist and activist living in Baltimore, Maryland. As a disabled Afro-Latina artist with ADHD and Graves' Disease she uses graphic design and photography as a means to discuss the intersection of disability rights and anti-racism, and to give visibility to misrepresented voices. After completing her Masters degree, she taught as professor of Visual Communication Design at Bowie State University. Some of her more famous works include the Black Disabled Lives Matter symbol, and a Black autistic joy advocacy zine called Knox Roxs.

== Early life and education ==
White-Johnson was born to a Puerto-Rican mother and a Chicagoan father and was raised in Maryland and Washington, D.C.

She earned her BA in Visual Arts from University of Maryland, Baltimore County and also completed an MFA in Graphic Design from the Maryland Institute College of Art.

== Career ==
White-Johnson has taught as a Guest Lecturer at the University of Minnesota School of Design's Design Justice Initiative.

She has previously taught as assistant professor of Visual Communications at Bowie State University, where she was the student faculty advisor for the Bowie State chapter of American Institute of Graphic Arts (AIGA). She has also worked for brands including Nike, Converse, Twitter, Amazon, Today at Apple, and Google Stories, discussing and creating events around the intersection of art and disability activism. In 2019, she was a featured panelist at a 5 Points event titled "How to be a Black Designer Without Losing Your Soul". In 2020, White-Johnson was an honoree on the D-30 Disability Impact List for her protest art and anti-racist designs, and in 2021 she was highlighted in a list of 20 Latino Artists to Watch by the Today Show.

=== Artwork and activism ===
==== Black disabled lives matter symbol ====
In 2020, White-Johnson created the black disabled lives matter symbol in response to conversations around police brutality. She took the graphic of the Black power fist and combined it with the infinity symbol, which represents the autistic spectrum, and the greater neurodiversity movement. She made the symbol accessible to others by making it free to download from her website, and it was protestors in the United States, United Kingdom and by former president Barack Obama. The symbol was used in a June 6 protest in Washington, D.C., being led by two Black disabled activists, Justice Shorter and Keri Gray. Her goal though creating this symbol was to encourage further discussion about disability and intersectionality in activism, and to convey the message that "To Be Pro-Neurodiversity is to be Anti-Racist". The symbol has been featured in Teen Vouge's article "Black Disabled Lives Matter: We Can't Erase Disability in #BLM" and on Black Education Matter's Black Disabled Lives Matter resource page.

==== Knox Roxs ====
White-Johnson released a limited-edition photography based zine in 2018 called Knox Roxs. The book features her autistic son, Knox, and 72 pages of photos. The book seeks to increase visibility for neurodiverse children of color, and showcase Black autistic joy. After the book was published, it inspired many family zine workshops where activism and resistance take the form of caregiving. The zine has also been featured in AfroPunk and the 2019 Women's March on Washington, and it is currently in the permanent collections of the libraries at the Metropolitan Museum of Art and the National Museum of Women in the Arts.

== Exhibitions and campaign ==
=== Disrupt and Resist ===
White-Johnson curated and was included in the exhibit "Disrupt and Resist" at George Mason University's Mason Exhibitions gallery in Fall 2023.

=== The Art of Disability Culture: Artists with Disabilities Dispelling Myths, Dissolving Barriers, and Disrupting Prejudice ===
White-Johnson's work was selected for The Art of Disability Culture: Artists with Disabilities Dispelling Myths, Dissolving Barriers, and Disrupting Prejudice exhibition at the Palo Alto Arts Center from September 11, 2021, to December 11, 2021. The show called for a sense of community by incorporating disability culture though artwork. It was composed entirely of artists with disabilities, and highlighted their creative expression of their experiences.

=== The Future Generation Exhibition ===
In May 2019, China Martins and Jennifer White-Johnson hosted an open-house event around the concept of motherhood. It fostered a discussion about mothering and craft, and participants were encouraged to make zines to examine their own relationship with motherhood.

=== Autism Acceptance Month advocacy campaign and photo narrative ===
In April 2017, White-Johnson released a series of photos along with a mission statement in honor of Autism Awareness month, featuring her son. The message she wanted to convey was to "Advocate autistic voices, Advocate acceptance, Advocate autistic love, Advocate for your autistic self, Advocate autistic opinions, Advocate inclusion".

== Personal life ==
White-Johnson is married to Kevin and they have one son.

== Publications ==
- White-Johnson, Jennifer. "Amplifying Accessibility and Abolishing Ableism: Designing to Embolden Black Disability Visual Culture", in An Anthology of Blackness: The State of Black Design. Edited by Terresa Moses and Omari Souza, 221-228. Cambridge, MA: MIT Press, 2024. ISBN 9780262048668.
- White-Johnson, Jennifer. "DisCrit Mothering as a Radical Act." International Journal of Qualitative Studies in Education April 2024, 1-14. doi:10.1080/09518398.2024.2326823
