= Alexander St. Lo Malet =

English cricketer and British Army officer

Personal information
- Full name: Alexander George William St. Lo Malet
- Born: 25 October 1845; Portsmouth, Hampshire, England
- Died: 11 January 1922 (aged 76); Marylebone, London, England
- Batting: Right-handed

Career statistics
Competition	First-class
Matches	1
Runs scored	23
Batting average	11.50
100s/50s	0/0
Top score	12
Catches/stumpings	1/–
- Source: Cricinfo, 22 June 2019

Alexander George William St. Lo Malet (25 October 1845 – 11 January 1922) was an English first-class cricketer and British Army officer. A career soldier, St. Lo Malet served in the 39th Regiment of Foot from 1866–84. In addition to his military career, he played first-class cricket in 1865.

== Military career and first-class cricket ==
St. Lo Malet was born at Portsmouth to Lieutenant Colonel Charles St. Lo Malet and his wife, Jane St. Lo Clarke. He attended the Royal Military College, graduating into the 39th Regiment of Foot as an ensign in March 1864. The following year he made a single appearance in first-class cricket for the Gentlemen of England against the Gentlemen of Middlesex at Islington. Batting twice in the match, he was dismissed in the Gentlemen of England first-innings for 11 runs by Russell Walker, while in their second-innings he was dismissed for 12 runs by Anthony Wilkinson. He purchased the rank of lieutenant in May 1867. He was promoted to the rank of captain in January 1878. He was seconded for duty with the Territorial Auxiliary in July 1881, at which point he was also promoted to the rank of major. However, this promotion was cancelled in September of the following year. He retired from active service in March 1884. St. Lo Malet died at Marylebone in January 1922.
