= Andrea Accordi =

Italian chef

Andrea Accordi is an Italian chef working at Four Seasons Hotel Bangkok at Chao Phraya River in Bangkok, Thailand. He became the first chef to receive the Michelin star in Eastern Europe.

== Career ==
Accordi began his career in Mantua in northern Italy. He then spent some time in London, Switzerland, and Saint Tropez. He received his first Michelin star as the chef of Villa La Vedetta in Florence (Italy). In 2007 he moved to Prague, where in 2008 he received his second Michelin star, the first Michelin star awarded in the so-called Eastern Bloc. He won further stars in 2009 and 2010, making his third and fourth career stars. His work in Prague was due to end in October 2011, when he planned to move to Saint Petersburg as a chef in first Four Seasons hotel in Russia.

His current position is that of Executive Chef at Four Seasons Hotel Bangkok at Chao Phraya River since 2019.

== Awards ==
- Michelin star (Villa Le Vedetta) Florence
- Michelin star (Allegro) Prague

== Sources ==
- Andrea Accordi (cz)
- Andrea Accordi – the chef who was awarded Prague's first Michelin star
- Michelin Guide: Main cities of Europe 2008, Prague
