= Gerard Le Feuvre =

British musician (born 1962)

- Born: 11 September 1962 (age 63); Jersey, Channel Islands
- Occupation: Musician
- Instruments: Cello

Gerard Le Feuvre (born 11 September 1962) is a British musician.

== Early life and education ==
Le Feuvre was born on 11 September 1962 in Jersey, Channel Islands, one of four children of a Jersey businessman. He is an alumnus of the Royal Academy of Music in London, the Banff School of Performing Arts in Canada and the Sibelius Academy in Finland.

== Career ==
Le Feuvre is a cellist and has won many accolades for his performances, the first of which was the CBS Records Award in the Royal Society of Arts competition in 1980, when 18 years old. He was still a student at this time.

Le Feuvre founded Kings Chamber Orchestra of London in 1985.

In 2007, the States of Jersey undertook to find a new anthem by means of an open competition. The final judging of the competition took place with a public performance of the short-listed pieces on 30 April 2008. The winner of the competition was declared to be "Island Home" composed by Le Feuvre. The States will take the decision on whether to ratify the adoption of a new anthem in the light of public reaction to the results of the competition. However the public vote was in favour of the composition by James Taberner.

== Personal life ==
He has three children, Katie, Al, and Edouard.
