= Kings Chamber Orchestra =

Chamber orchestra in the UK

The King's Chamber Orchestra is a professional chamber orchestra based in the United Kingdom. Formed in 1985 (40 years ago) by Gerard Le Feuvre, it performs many times throughout the year in London, the Home Counties, and Jersey.

Originally performing as a symphony orchestra, regular concerts as a chamber orchestra began in the 1990s to support the Christian charitable work of Youth With A Mission. Consequently, the orchestra's first series in the smaller format were given at YWAM's beautiful estate in Harpenden, Hertfordshire.

The KCO's members are distinguished musicians, committed Christians, and friends whom Gerard has gathered together while freelancing with some of the finest orchestras in the UK, and who "share an interest in breaking down traditional walls for the sake of reaching a new generation." This is manifested in programmes that are diverse and unpredictable, including Teddy Concerts for younger children. During the last twenty years KCO has broadcast, recorded, and performed in a variety of venues ranging from the Royal Albert Hall to a number of more local venues.

The KCO has recorded three CDs of music:

- Landscapes
- Romance
- Freedom and Peace
- String Heaven
- Christmas String Heaven
- Christmas String Heaven II (Lost in Love)
- Christmas String Heaven III (In the Secret Place)
- Christmas String Heaven IV (Joy to the World)
- River
