= Gianfranco Chiarini =

- Gianfranco Chiarini (centre)
- Born: January 8, 1966 (age 60); Ferrara,Italy
- Education: Le Cordon Bleu
- Culinary career
- Cooking style: Italian
- Television show
- CNN Türk

Gianfranco Chiarini (born January 8, 1966) is an Italian chef from Ferrara, Italy. Chiarini's culinary style is Italian nouvelle fusion cuisine. He was born in Ferrara, Italy and currently resides in his farm, located in city of Heeswijk-Dinther in the Netherlands.

== Personal life ==
On September 7, 2010, Chiarini married Anna Kinga Jarosławska, now Anna Chiarini, born in Słupsk, Poland, a Media studies and Italian literature graduate at the University of Hamburg, Germany.

== Professional career ==
In 1986, Chiarini enrolled in the Instituto de Alta Gastronomia de Caracas, Venezuela, which has since been closed. During this time, Chiarini studied and worked in several restaurants. In 1996, Chiarini returned to the United States where he enrolled at the Pittsburgh Culinary Institute and pursued culinary studies. Soon after, he moved to Paris where he enrolled at Le Cordon Bleu. He worked at Michelin restaurants, and later while in Rome.

Back in Ferrara, he worked as a sous chef at Antichi Sapori and Hostaria Savonarola. He later moved to Germany to work at The Pirsch Mühle. In Kuwait, he prepared dinners for the late Highness Sheikh Jaber Al-Ahmad Al-Jaber Al-Sabah and his family. In Addis Abeba, Chiarini worked for the Starwood hotels chain at the Sheraton Luxury Collection.

On June 4, 2011, Chiarini launched his Italian restaurant in Kolkata, India, Casa Toscana.
