= Alessandro Borghese =

Italian chef (born 1976)

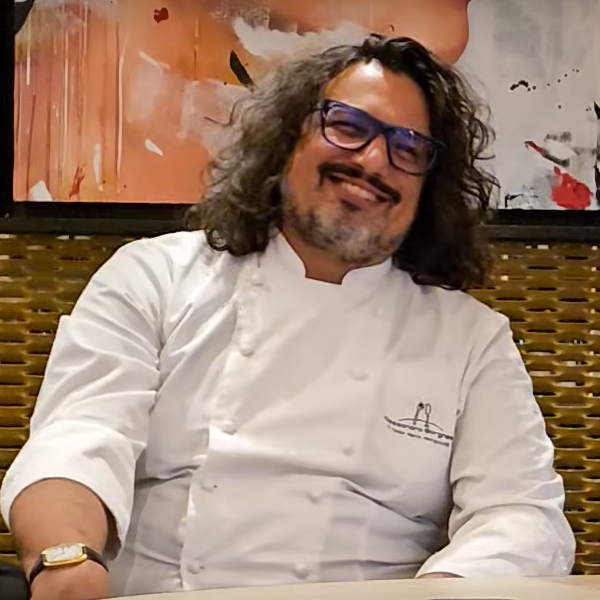
- Borghese in 2024
- Born: 19 November 1976 (age 49); San Francisco, California, U.S.
- Education: American Overseas School of Rome
- Parents: Luigi Borghese; Barbara Bouchet
- Culinary career
- Cooking style: Italian
- Current restaurants
- Alessandro Borghese – Il lusso della semplicità (Milan, Italy); AB – Il lusso della semplicità (Venice, Italy)
- Television shows
- Alessandro Borghese – 4 ristoranti; Kitchen Duel; Alessandro Borghese – Celebrity Chef

Alessandro Borghese (born 19 November 1976) is an Italian celebrity chef, restaurateur, and television personality. Borghese began his chef career by working as a cook on cruise ships, including the MS Achille Lauro when it sank in 1994. In the early 2000s, after working in France, the United Kingdom, and the United States, he returned to Italy, where he began a successful television career, in addition to his continued work in the restaurateur industry.

Borghese is the author, host, and judge of various culinary and talent shows, most notably those associated with the MasterChef format and his own shows, such as Alessandro Borghese – 4 ristoranti, Kitchen Duel, and Alessandro Borghese – Celebrity Chef. He also wrote several books, including an audiobook merging music and cuisine, and is the owner of two restaurants and of a restaurateur-based company with his wife.

== Early life and family ==
Borghese was born on 19 November 1976 in San Francisco, California, the first son of Naples businessman Luigi Borghese (1936–2016) and German-Italian actress Barbara Bouchet (born 1943). His parents, who married in 1974 and had another children named Max, divorced in 2006. Bouchet stated in a 2009 interview that her son had become more famous than her. Borghese described his father a "role model", a "life coach, my superhero" who had many jobs, from working in the cinema industry as a producer to selling vacuum cleaners. He said that he taught him humility as he went to do door-to-door demonstrations with him. He instilled him not only a love of cooking, becoming a Sunday cook, but also a love for cars as he came from a family of racing drivers.

Borghese's first car was his mother's Renault Twingo, which he could drive at 16 due to his American license. His father taught him to drive an Autobianchi Y10, with Borghese recalling "he would take me out on Sundays and whenever I messed up the clutch, he would take me back to the garage and we would talk about going out the following Sunday. He was very strict: I had to learn to drive properly." As he lived in a private park, he could drive at 14 his father's Lancia Delta HF Integrale Evoluzione. When his father died due to leukemia, which Borghese described as "the illness of the century, a long illness", his mother was always by his side. Borghese described his father as more "down to earth" and his mother as more "clouds above clouds".

Of his childhood memories, Borghese said they are "filled with the scent of ragù filling the kitchen on Sunday mornings. I remember my father's hands and tasting the bread for breakfast. His smile, the way he described a recipe to me, and his advice, like a special gift, shaped what would gradually become my profession as a chef." Borghese had a happy childhood except for a dramatic episode he only became aware of many years later, as he told Silvia Toffanin on Verissimo in March 2019. His family began to receive kidnapping threats, and as a result his father, who also obtained a gun license, decided to send him to the United States, where he went to school and lived in San Francisco at his paternal grandmother's house, experiencing the life of the eccentric Bouchet family. He said: "My mother's family is a bit peculiar; I nicknamed them the 'Bouchetbaums,' after 'The Royal Tenenbaums.' My uncle was a bit eccentric; in the mornings, he would sip his coffee completely naked."

While Borghese had good relations with his father, his relations with his mother were more complex, especially because she was different from those of his peers for cultural reasons and because of her work in the entertainment world. For instance, Borghese recalled that he was made fun of due to his mother posing nude for magazines like Playboy. As Borghese refused to go to university and was unsure about his prospects at 18, his mother kicked him out of the house and told him, as she recalled in a February 2020 episode of the TV show Vieni da me hosted on Rai 1 by Caterina Balivo, to "start going out and seeing the world, to stand on his own two feet. It helped, it went well, right? He made a bit of an effort, but it went well." Borghese described Bouchet as a strict and absent mother, saying that she was not a "typical Italian mother, the one who makes you a little basket of croissants or tucks you in", before adding: "She fed me with a wooden spoon, pulled down my pants, and spanked me. She was always there, but I was also left alone a lot with the nannies. She and dad would often leave me at Elia's house, my longtime nanny. You could say I grew up with her and her husband."

== Cruise ships cook and sinking of the Achille Lauro ==
After attending St. George's British International School in Rome, Borghese graduated from the American Overseas School of Rome. Following his graduation, owing to his Italian-American origins and multilingualism, Borghese embarked on cruise ships overseas, where he worked as dishwasher, kitchen assistant, and chef for three years, which he defined as his "floating gastronomic university". Borghese said that he wanted to do something different from his parents as he did not want to be an actor and instead wanted to travel the world and cook. He was 17 when he set sail for the first time. He came aboard as an au pair with a room and board, but without a salary. After eight months, he had his job confirmed with a salary of 800,000 lire (€413,17) a month. During the next three years, he traveled extensively in the Mediterranean but also in South Africa. Of this period, Borghese later said: "My father was a carpet auctioneer on ships, and with his connections he got me on board. Because I was Barbara Bouchet's son, I worked twice as hard. They looked at me like I was an alien, like the typical rich boy who lasts a week. I stayed there for three years."

Borghese was part of the crew of the Achille Lauro during this period, experiencing firsthand the shipwreck off the coast of Somalia on 30 November 1994, and remained three days in the open sea on a lifeboat in the company of other shipwrecked people. About the sinking, Borghese recalled: "The ship caught fire. The rule is that the crew disembarks last before abandoning ship. I risked my life because I went back to the dressing room to retrieve the Walkman my mom and dad had given me, which cost 300,000 lire [€154,94]. We were submerged for three days. We were off the coast of Somalia, and it took time to rescue 900 people from the middle of the sea. I wasn't afraid: I was an excited 18-year-old. My mother had called everyone, including the President of the Republic [Oscar Luigi Scalfaro], to find out what had happened to me."

During the COVID-19 pandemic in Italy, Borghese recalled the events, stating: "I have looked death in the face and I say: let's not be discouraged now." In September 2024, he again discussed this episode on Da noi...a ruota libera, a TV show on Rai 1 hosted by Francesca Fialdini, saying: "A very intense adventure. I spent three days stranded on a raft. We were rescued by a Greek tanker, the Hawaiian King, which took us back to Mombasa, Kenya, and then I set off on another cruise." Borghese said that he was a 18 years old who had been on board for about a year on a transfer cruise from Genoa to Durban, South Africa. He added that some engines in the stern exploded, creating a leak and a large fire. When asked on the show how to survive in such situations, he stated: "With a desalination plant and K rations that aren't as good as my cacio e pepe." He also recalled that his mother heard the news on TV and were only able to communicate when he boarded on the Hawaiian King.

== Cooking and restaurateur career ==
From 1997 to 2000, Borghese worked as a cook in London, San Francisco, Copenhagen, and Paris. Returning to Italy, he attended sommelier school, then left for New York City. A few years later, Borghese once again returned to Italy, where he also started a television career, and often ranks restaurants. He said: "Cooking is the soul of Italy, and it's about time there was more of it on TV! I'm very happy to have pioneered this new vision of Italian food and cuisine. I've always been a supporter of progress; it bridges distances and improves culture." Describing himself as a "half American [with] a profoundly rock soul", Borghese said that "Italy is always at the forefront of trendsetting, especially in fashion and cuisine", and that when he began his television career, wearing his black tuxedo and pairing his recipes with music, his colleagues considered him a revolutionary while his supporters told him "You rock, guy!" Borghese's 4 ristoranti in particular proved to be so successful that for the restaurateur who came on top at the end of each episode was akin winning MasterChef. As a result of his successful television career, Borghese entered Italian popular culture and Internet memes, being known as "the only one who can confirm or overturn the result", as he often said on his TV show; among the other catchphrases that entered meme culture were "Diesci" and "Locascion". Borghese himself responded to criticism with memes.

Upon his second return in Italy, Borghese worked in several restaurants in Milan and Rome, which he said was the city that struck him the most, stating that Rome was "the place where I worked the most. However, the three months in Paris, the three in New York, the six in San Francisco, and the year in London also shaped me at an age when I was hungry for knowledge and understanding." He also wrote a series of books that became bestsellers. In 2009, he wrote L'abito non fa il cuoco. La cucina italiana di uno chef gentiluomo (2009), which was published by Rizzoli. This was followed by Tu come lo fai? I tuoi piatti preferiti in più di 100 ricette dello chef (2013), which was published by Mondadori; Kitchen Shuffle. Storie di cucina in musica (2014), which was a recipe book, plus two CDs produced by Columbia Records containing 30 tracks within six musical journeys, spanning from rock music to jazz to hardcore and classic ballads, by a range of international artists, including among others Bob Dylan, Marvin Gaye, Louis Armstrong & His All Stars, and Spin Doctors; Alessandro Borghese Kitchen Sound. Senti come suona questo piatto! (2017), which was published by Mondadori Electa; Cacio&Pepe. La mia vita in 50 ricette (2018), which was published by Solferino; and Alessandro Borghese. 4 ristoranti. Il libro guida ai ristoranti del programma (2019), which was published by Mondadori Electa. In 2013, he also created the Paginafood web portal, which was dedicated to Italian gastronomic excellence and designer kitchen utensils.

During his career, Borghese was involved in consulting in the restaurateur business, licensing, advertising, and publishing, and for this purpose founded in 2010, alongside his wife who is the managing director, the Milan-based AB Normal – Eatertainment Company. He described it as "our restaurant, TV production, branding, and food consulting company, with an in-house team supported by marketing and communications. We work with over sixty people and under the brand ... of my restaurant in Milan. Simplicity in the kitchen means many things. It could mean reducing a dish to its basic form or focusing on one ingredient to experience its essence. In any case, 'simple' in the kitchen rarely means 'easy.' Simplicity is the foundation of genius; without knowledge, there is no flavor!" In late 2017, Borghese opened his first restaurant in Milan, called Alessandro Borghese – Il lusso della semplicità. Located in the CityLife area, on the first floor of Palazzo Giò Ponti, Borghese said in an October 2017 interview with the Corriere della Sera: "No one in Italy opens a restaurant on the first floor. It only happens in New York. But I want to surprise." His most famous recipe is cacio e pepe, and the restaurant area, covering around 700 square meters, also includes the headquarters of his company, combining administrative offices and rooms for cooking classes, dinners, or private events, and the cocktail bar.

Borghese said that during his career he never had "renowned masters" or real experience in "great starred kitchens", claiming to be a true "self-made man" with "a thousand experiences in many small restaurants". When Borghese opened his first restaurant in 2017, his company was making €2 million a year. By 2022, it was a full-fledged catering, banqueting, and entertainment company and a diversified group with more than 50 employees. In 2022 and 2023, Borghese was a cook for the government in Washington, D.C., and was ranked at No. 10 in the list of the top Italian chef influencers, alongside fellow celebrity chefs Antonino Cannavacciuolo, Bruno Barbieri, and Massimo Bottura, by Flu Plus; as of March 2023, he had 1.9 million of followers on Instagram, behind the 3 million of Cannavacciuolo but ahead of the 1.3 million of Barbieri. In June 2022, Borghese opened his second restaurant in Venice, called AB – Il lusso della semplicità. Both of his restaurants are family-friendly as many children watch Borghese on television and go to his restaurants. In the 2025 Michelin Guide, Borghese's restaurant in Venice did not yet earn a star but received a special mention. Also in 2025, Borghese was listed at No. 8 among the most influential Italian chefs ("The Most Powerful Chefs") by Forbes Italia.

== Television career ==
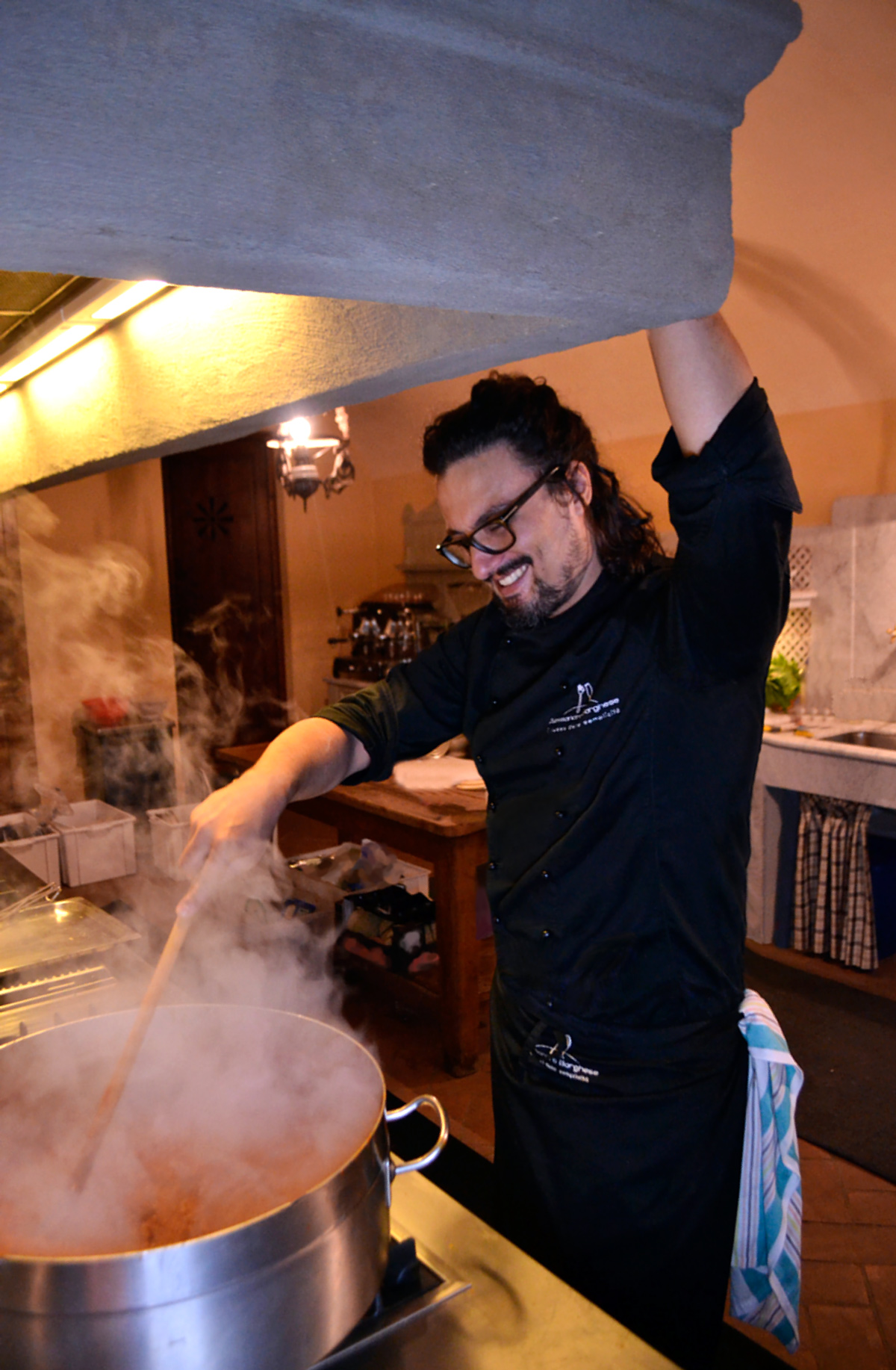
Borghese in 2015

2004 was a turning point for Borghese's career. As he was about to leave for Hong Kong, where he was supposed to stay for three years, he got an audition for the Discovery Channel during the early days of satellite television in Italy. He described this as "my Sliding Doors", and went on to host over 20 TV shows. Borghese said that he felt "like a pioneer", and added that "the message, the format, works when it leads the viewer to discover the cuisine, but also the region. But always with a lighthearted approach. We're not talking about open-heart surgery... And the important thing is to be professional, without taking ourselves too seriously. Let's just say that on TV there have been serious and less serious offerings; some have fallen by the wayside, others have remained. There has been a certain selection." He recalled that his television career began thanks to his mother, who introduced him to a friend of hers who was "auditioning", and took pride for being the host of "the first themed channel dedicated to cooking" before landing on Real Time.

In 2005, Borghese made his television debut. From 2005 to 2012, he hosted Cortesie per gli ospiti, a TV show on Real Time produced by Magnolia. Also in 2005, he hosted L'ost on Real Time. In 2006, he hosted Cuoco gentiluomo on Real Time. From 2007 to 2011, Borghese moved to La7 as the host of Chef per un giorno. In 2009, he returned to Real Time with Chef a domicilio and also debuted on RAI, Italy's public broadcaster, by hosting Ci vediamo domenica on Rai 2. From 2009 to 2012, Borghese hosted Fuori menù on Real Time. In 2010, he hosted Cuochi e fiamme on La7 and Cortesie per gli ospiti New York on Real Time. In 2011, he appeared respectively as a competitor and judge of Lasciami cantare! on Rai 1 and La notte degli chef on Canale 5. From 2011 to 2013, he hosted Cucina con Ale on Real Time.

In 2012, Borghese made a small appearance in an episode of the Italian version of Camera Café. Alongside fellow celebrity chefs, such as Barbieri, Joe Bastianich and his mother Lidia Bastianich, Cannavacciuolo, Carlo Cracco, Giorgio Locatelli, and Antonia Klugmann, he then became one of the most well-known faces on Sky Italia and one of the most well-known television personalities in the culinary field. From 2012 to 2013, he hosted Ale contro tutti on Sky Uno. From 2014 to 2016, he was one of the judges on the culinary talent show Junior MasterChef Italia on Sky Uno. In 2014, he was the Italian voice actor of Morad Sumar in Star Wars Rebels. In September 2016, before taking part to a cooking show with Fabrizio Nonis, Borghese was the protagonist of the ribbon cutting ceremony in Piazza Sant'Antonio to open the thirteenth edition of Gusti di Frontiera.

In 2015, Borghese began hosting Alessandro Borghese – 4 ristoranti on Sky Uno's prime time and then often broadcast again in every time slot on TV8, and was a constant on Sky Italia's free rerun channel as one of the most well known chef personalities on television. Also in 2015, he began hosting Kitchen Sound on Sky Uno. The restaurateur Daniele Bovolato, who had taken part to the Padua episode of 4 ristoranti in July 2018 and finished last, accused the filming production of having manipulated the episode to make his restaurant appear in a negative view. Bovolato announced that he was not pursuing legal action claiming an "enormous damage to image" against Borghese and Sky Uno, largely because of certain contractual clauses he had signed prior to participating in the show. In a September 2019 article about the Roman Castles, Liz Boulter of The Guardian cited for a good dinner several restaurants and restaurateurs that appeared in a 4 ristoranti episode, which was won by Osteria di Corte of chef Marco Liberti for its cacio e pepe. Due to the COVID-19 pandemic, the format of 4 ristoranti was revised to accommodate the changes, for example by focusing on food delivery. In ten years as of December 2024, 4 ristoranti showed 480 restaurants distributed throughout each Italian region, 8 times abroad, 336 specialities, and 1,924 desserts.

From 2017 to 2019, and then again in 2021, after being replaced by Barbieri in 2020, Borghese was the host of Cuochi d'Italia on TV8. In 2018, he was a juror of Miss Italia on La7. In 2019, Borghese began hosting Kitchen Duel on Sky Uno. In 2021, he hosted three shows on TV8/Sky Uno, including Cuochi d'Italia: Speciale Natale 2020, Alessandro Borghese – Piatto ricco with the collaboration of Michelin-starred chef Gennaro Esposito, and Game of Talents, a game show about talent teams led by Frank Matano and Mara Maionchi. Also in 2021, Borghese hosted two podcasts produced by Dopcast: Alessandro Borghese Kitchen Podcast, based on its Kitchen Shuffle merging cuisine with music; and C come Contrappasso di Alessandro Borghese, where he discussed his personal experience during the COVID-19 pandemic. In 2022, he began hosting Alessandro Borghese – Celebrity Chef on TV8/Sky Uno, with journalist Angela Frenda and multi-starred chef Enrico Bartolini as judges. Within a few weeks, Celebrity Chef reached 561,000 viewers in the early evening with a 3 percent share, a positive result especially when considering the very crowded time slot.

== Restaurants ==
Borghese is the owner of two restaurants, one in Milan and the other in Venice, under the Il lusso della semplicità brand. As for why he came to be a restaurant owner, he said: "I wanted to give a home to my ideas and the dreams I've nurtured for many years. Many asked me. It started out as a catering, events, and wedding company. It had offices, kitchens, and services, but no physical location, a 'home.' So my wife and I decided it was time to make sacrifices, to invest in creating what today is the luxury of simplicity, both in philosophy and brand. It's part of the ABNormal company [named after Borghese]. In addition to the restaurant, there's a catering and banqueting company and some entertainment activities. A diversified group that currently employs more than 50 people."

After the outbreak of the COVID-19 pandemic in Italy, Borghese said: "It will take at least two years to get back to normality. Let's not expect the state to solve our problem. Who will survive? Those who can reinvent themselves and those who are honest and know their job: the uninitiated will succumb, there will be a huge selection." As restoration was among the industries most affected by the pandemic, with the Italian Federation of Public Establishments estimating a loss of €34 billion and with over 350 thousand jobs at risk in 2020, he lamented the lack of state support. In an interview to the Corriere della Sera, he also lamented the risk of closure, stating: "Now we're at a standstill. Everything is closed. And I'm paying my 64 employees the redundancy checks: I couldn't let them wait months for the funds to arrive due to bureaucracy. But we can't hold out like this for long. Another month. If things don't improve, I'll have to decide what to do with staff, rent, and bills. But it's an eventuality I hope I don't have to face."

In 2021, Borghese's restaurant in Milan had a deficit of €74,000 while the AB Normal company, primarily handling Borghese's television business, had a turnover of approximately €1.8 million and a profit of €285,000. These difficulties were in line within the broader restaurateur industry and were symptomatic of a sustainability issue among Michelin-starred restaurants, as was also outlined by René Redzepi to The New York Times. Asked whether European Union regulations, the COVID-19 pandemic, climate change, and the 2021–2023 global supply chain crisis and worse international relations risked affecting the Italian agrifood sector and restaurant industry, which remained among Italy's flagships, Borghese said: "We all read the newspapers; we're aware of what's happening. We too, in our own fields, must be ready to roll up our sleeves and rethink our work. There's no doubt that there will be changes; we can already see them. Which ones? I don't have a crystal ball, but it'll be up to us to react and face the new challenges."

When Borghese opened his first restaurant in 2017, he said: "I don't like overly complicated recipes, nor am I aiming for Michelin stars. Sure, I always hope for a good review, but the restaurant's goal is, first and foremost, to make good food. I want people to eat, not taste." Vowing not to "aim for Michelin stars", he reiterated that "the restaurant's goal is, above all, to make good food", while not shying away from good reviews, stating: "Stars are important, of course, but I love cooking and I'm happy to be a chef, regardless." About the proliferation of stars, forks, and hats awards, he further said: "Well, if the judges are serious and knowledgeable, it's nice to be included in an authoritative guide. The best is certainly Michelin, but I see it as an additional opportunity for a chef."

=== In Milan ===
Borghese established his first restaurant in October 2017. Inaugurated in Milan on 27 September, the same day of his wife's 42nd birthday, with a seating capacity of 50, the spirit was designed to be rock and roll and the recipes were not overly codified or consistently the same. Borghese promised to the diners of his first permanent restaurant to offer Milanese people the best cacio e pepe in the city. The menu had flavors of Lazio and Naples, which represented Borghese's two souls, while also looking abroad, having been born in San Francisco, raised in Rome, and resided in Milan. Following the Italian meal structure, the menu featured five appetizers, five first courses, five second courses, and desserts, such as fresh pasta tortelli, Genoese-style meat, spaghetti alla Nerano, roast lamb, pasta and potatoes with smoked provola cheese, or low-temperature pork ribs. As for the choice of Milan rather than Rome, he said that "Milan is the last frontier before expatriation", further stating: "It's the only international city we have in Italy where things get done, where three appointments are constructive, where meritocracy reigns. It's vibrant, always buzzing, down-to-earth like me. It's the only place where I can work in Italy."

During its initial period, Borghese's restaurant opened its doors only in the late afternoon for apéritif and dinner, before serving breakfast and lunch in the following weeks, and offering an à la carte menu or a business lunch option, featuring salads, fish, and first courses. In the words of Borghese, the reservation system was based on the "American-style, online credit card service: this means that those who decide not to come at the last minute, as many unfortunately do, will still have to pay for the missed dinner." Borghese further emphasized that he would be the first to do so, and that "with 50 seats, you can't afford late cancellations". À la carte, the cost was estimated to be around €70 per person, which Borghese considered "a fair price for Milan and this area" that combined haute cuisine with a relatively moderate bill. Explaining his motto for the restaurant, he said: "Cooking is an act of love because we dedicate our time to offering a moment of joy and beauty to those who visit us in our 'temples.' Cooking is an act of love because it is an act of altruism. You give something to someone every time you cook. But it takes a lot of dedication. Cooking is also an act of love for ourselves. We must love ourselves."

For the furnishings, Borghese and his team opted for a retro theme, vaguely reminiscent of 1920s-style cruise ships, where Borghese worked "for a long time ... and they have remained in my heart", with an iron entrance door and thoughtfully designed modern lighting. For his restaurant, Borghese chose the language of technology and efficiency, stating: "We used natural glues and air-cleaning lights developed by the University of Manchester, with plenty of rock, blues, and jazz music playing in the background and a soundproofing system." In line with his transparency promise, the kitchen was made open to view like the outdoor vegetable garden, underscoring his "sincerity as a person" and the simplicity of his gastronomic offerings. In addition to food, Borghese's restaurant reflected his other two passions in art and music. Guests of his restaurant can admire previously unseen works of art, for example Rodolfo Viola, street artist Kayone, Roberto Dell'Acqua, Mario Lisi, and Roberta Bissoli, and be entertained by a DJ set every evening. Borghese said: "Art is a family passion that has been brought into the restaurant, which houses a permanent gallery. Every two or three months we have an artist exhibit. As for music, I'd like to point out that it has the same evocative power as food. I have a regular DJ every evening with vinyl and rock music, from Led Zeppelin to Flash." By 2022, the restaurant was expanded with a seating capacity of 80 and part of a group of over 50 employees.

=== In Venice ===
Originally scheduled for April 2022, Borghese opened his second restaurant in June 2022, located on the ground floor of Ca' Vendramin Calergi, the 16th-century building (founded in 1638) in Venice that housed the oldest casino in the world. Within the Cannaregio district (sestiere), it overlooks the Grand Canal between Palazzo D'Anna Viaro Martinengo Volpi di Misurata (Casa Volpi) and Palazzo Marcello, in front of Palazzo Belloni Battagia and the Fontego del Megio. A gourmet restaurant with a bistro area and garden on the Grand Canal, it was established with a space of 740 square meters, 400 of which were occupied by the indoor dining room accommodating 30 guests for the gourmet menu and 50 for the bistro, in addition to the 340 square meters of outdoor space. In total, five different rooms housed the gourmet restaurant, café, bistro with pastry shop, bar, and wine cellar. The design involved industry professionals and specialized artisans, and the bistro area featured a pastry counter, clad in bottle-green enameled lava stone slabs.

Borghese said that opening a restaurant in Venice was a lifelong dream, as he and his wife always enjoyed their time spent in the city. They nurtured the project for some time and presented it before the COVID-19 pandemic and after the acqua alta of November 2019, when he responded to the Venice mayor Luigi Brugnaro and city's call for proposals to rent part of the casino building to a restaurant business. Borghese told the Corriere della Sera: "After the high waters of November 2019, the mayor of Venice, Brugnaro, who is a friend of mine, asked me to cook for a Confindustria fundraiser. That evening, I discovered that the city had launched an exploratory call to rent part of the casino building to a restaurant business. I immediately submitted an expression of interest, and the project was chosen." He also began filming in the building some episodes of Celebrity Chef.

Borghese's restaurant in Venice followed the same format as in Milan, sharing the same name while holding some adaptation exclusive of Venice, being more like a bistro than a traditional restaurant. As in the Milan restaurant, the interior spaces in Venice included an art gallery for young artists to exhibit their works. Borghese said: "Of course I'll bring my own dishes ... but a good 80 percent will be revisited dishes from Venetian and Veneto traditions, using local products ... If it were up to me, I would have prepared a menu with at least eighty items ... in any case, we'll also have a bartender with cocktails and lots of music, rock of course, with a DJ." Initially, the restaurant was open from 10:00 a.m. for a breakfast brunch until the after dinner, with lunch, apéritif, and dinner also available. The restaurant was originally open only in the evenings to accommodate the taping of the TV show Celebrity Chef. From mid-July, it was fully operational, also thanks to the work of a team of about thirty Italian and international staff. In addition to local Venetian staff, Borghese said that "we also have four talented and well-trained Ukrainians", with a total of around thirty people working on the project by Food Media Factory, a company born from the synergy between Borghese's AB Normal and Rome's public relations company MNComm. The restaurant was already fully booked for three months, and Borghese observed that "we're quite full, but you can always try to get a table by taking advantage of any cancellations".

The menu was organized around a gourmet offering, incorporating some Venetian influences. In addition to cacio e pepe and anatra alla torba (toasted duck), local recipes were featured, for example gallina in saor (toasted chicken with dates and polenta chips), Venetian picanha with seared cabbage and passion fruit sauce, scampi busara with black garlic, sarde in saor, and risotto di Gò, a risotto flavored with ghiotto, a typical lagoon fish popular in Burano restaurants, as well as oysters and raw fish. The bistro also featured agnello alla torba (toasted lamb) and cacio e pepe, the most successful dishes on the Milanese menu. The typical Venetian cichetti from the bacari would be served in the garden overlooking the canal. In September 2023, Borghese announced the blue crab on the menu under the name granchio blu aiutame tu. In terms of interior design, there was limited freedom due to numerous constraints by the location. Borghese told the Corriere della Sera that he was inspired by the colors of Canaletto. Prices varied depending on the format, in line with Venice's Michelin-starred restaurants in the gourmet section, and more affordable in the bistro and outdoor area. Among first and second courses, prices ranged from a low of €26 to a high of €40.

== Culinary style and philosophy ==
Borghese often argues that other celebrity chefs like Gordon Ramsay and Jamie Oliver are not as good as the best Italian chefs but praises them for being able, also thanks to the media, to create a global business centered around the Mediterranean cuisine. About his own culinary style and philosophy, which can be summarized by his motto "Cooking Is An Act of Love" (cucinare è un atto d'amore), Borghese said: "There must be an idea, a construction behind every menu. From the starter to the dessert. The ingredients must be incredibly fresh, the courses must entice you to try the next course. And then if I can lend a hand with a little something, well, I do. ... The dish is an act of love. The chef must be curious and show love for his or her regional tradition." While the tradition of Italian cuisine evolved over the years, following the tastes, trends, and techniques of modern society, he argued: "In twenty years, we'll still be eating cacio e pepe." He said that cacio e pepe is the recipe that represents him the most.

Borghese said that cooking is "a serious thing, but not a staid one. In short, let's have fun, but with seriousness." About art, beauty, and food, all of which interest him, Borghese said: "The art of food is an adventure of the mind, a tug at the soul's strings. The memory that comes back alive after rediscovering that flavor. Without a doubt, beauty means inner well-being, when you feel affection, awareness, simply goodness. I give my best at home, because the best people are there, and that's beautiful." In the presentation of a dish, his culinary style blends with aesthetics, stating: "The eyes eat first, but it's on the palate that taste wins. An ingredient provokes you, stimulates you through its colors, its shapes, and its flavor. With talent and technique, you can transform it and make it your own special dish, tied to a unique moment. Aesthetics are fundamental in the presentation of my dishes; it must communicate all of this: love, flavor, research, and the moment of creation, igniting all the other senses."

When asked whether gourmet cuisine was too expensive, Borghese said that it is a hard work, earning the restaurateur a maximum of 10 percent, and added: "In Italy, you eat well everywhere because fortunately we have a gastronomic culture, from north to south, that gives us everything from pani câ meusa to gnocchi di prugne, up in Alto Adige. This isn't rhetoric, it's the truth." On the other hand, he criticized the food served at school. He launched an appeal asking to teach students at least one dish from their region to preserve Italian culinary culture, and said that they should be given a varied diet to stimulate their palates, further commenting: "If you eat junk food as a kid, you'll like it as an adult. We need to force kids to try more things." Of the future of cuisine, also referencing a food controversy by the Meloni government about cricket flour, Borghese said: "In the last 20 years, it's not like we've invented any great dishes. But we have to evolve, cuisine has to evolve. Then twice a week, a cacio e pepe is a good idea. Crickets? I eat them, and I eat them fried."

As a traditionalist of Italian cuisine, Borghese is critical of cultured meat, although he was not able to distinguish it from real meat during a segment by Le Iene. He expressed support for entomophagy, which is considered a taboo in Western countries, stating: "We already unknowingly eat half a kilo of insects a year. From coffee to cocoa, from pasta grains to rice, when they're processed, some insects end up in the process." During the panel titled "La cucina è un palcoscenico: 4Ristoranti per scoprire l’Italia", which was part of the Sky Inclusion Days held in June 2025 at the Teatro Dal Verme in Milan, Borghese said: "I'm not very in favor of lab-grown meat, but I strongly believe in the value of insects in the kitchen. They represent an important cultural resource, given that they are already an integral part of the diet in many gastronomic traditions around the world." He also said that cooking is "purely a passion, because it's hard work. There are no shortcuts, no ChatGPT in the kitchen... no carbonara made on the computer."

Borghese combines food with his other passion of music. While cooking, Borghese often listens to songs of the English rock band Led Zeppelin, the American rock band Red Hot Chili Peppers, early 1990s hip-hop, Italian singer-songwriter and poet Vasco Rossi, and Italian singer-songwriter and musician Pino Daniele. In "Vasco Rossi – Cambia-Menti Kitchen Shuffle Origine" of his 2014 audiobook Kitchen Shuffle. Storie di cucina in musica, he wrote that Italian cuisine is "a story of men and women and their great passion and attention to tradition and local products, a unique art, a precious vocation that never ceases to amaze, it is our being Italian, we are the only ones capable of asking what's for dinner during lunch." Borghese is a supporter of the Sanremo Festival, saying that one watches its final "like Italy playing in the World Cup". For the 2022 Sanremo Music Festival, he expressed his support for Elisa as competitor and Cesare Cremonini as guest, and associated the main protagonists with a recipe. About whether "everyone now thinks of themselves as Michelin-starred, connoisseurs, and great gourmets", Borghese said: "Come on, we Italians are like that. We're all Formula One drivers, we're all soccer coaches. Cooking is part of us, and obviously many of us enjoy trying our hand at it. And then one more cooking show is better than one more political talk show."

== Commentary and views about the restaurateur industry ==
Borghese often comments on the state of the Italian restaurateur industry, speaking of a crisis, particularly lamenting the lack of employment after the COVID-19 pandemic, while recognizing the right of young people to guarantees and an adequate salary. He supports Italian cuisine being recognized as World Heritage Site, and criticized the fact it was not on the list already, stating: "Mexican cuisine is on the list, but not ours. It seems ridiculous to me. Look at how well the French protect themselves, we don't know how to work as a team. There are restaurant chains all over the world with chefs like Gordon Ramsey. Name one Italian chef who owns a world-renowned chain: none. Jamie Oliver has become the guru of Italian cuisine, and he doesn't even know how to cook."

In a May 2020 interview to the Corriere della Sera, Borghese criticized the lack of state support, particularly for self-employed workers and self-employed individuals. He said: "The government's absence is razing the Italian restaurant industry to the ground ... Not only is there a lack of financial support for a sector that is the country's flagship, but there are also no rules to begin planning for the restart." He lamented the lack of clear and precise rules, commenting: "Sanitizing a 300-square-meter space costs between €1,000 and €3,000. How often will it need to be done? And, then, how should the spaces be set up? Not knowing makes it impossible to plan, and you can't improvise; the health of customers and workers depends on it." He further observed that balancing safety and work would be complicated, stating: "If it's two meters, my restaurant will go from 95 seats to 65. Still sustainable. If it's higher—even four meters has been mooted recently—I'll have to completely rethink my business, and I'll do it somehow, but many restaurateurs won't be able to reopen." Within the context of social distancing measures related to the COVID-19 pandemic, Borghese emphasized the risk of social distancing in the kitchen, stating: "Fine dining has dishes that require two or three people to prepare. Furthermore, this isn't my situation, but many establishments have tiny kitchens and could never adapt." Regarding the possibility of seating diners next to each other only if they are related or can at least demonstrate that they live together, Borghese dismissed it as "stupid", rhetorically asking: "Should someone ask diners if they're related and, if not, separate them? Let's not joke; those who come together will be aware of what they're doing."

In a December 2023 interview to La Stampa, Borghese further criticized the state of the restaurateur industry, stating: "In Italy, we have no sense of loyalty. We have to fleece customers when they arrive, and if they don't come back, who cares?" Referring to chefs who leave Italy to work abroad, he added: "We Italians outside of Italy give our best because we are united. Restaurateurs know each other and are always ready to lend a hand, quite the opposite of what happens in our country. Abroad, Italians are patriots." Borghese also commented on the summer controversy that saw very high receipts and bizarre customer requests, stating: "If I bring you an extra plate because you have to share the pasta with your mom, with the child, I can't charge you for it. Of course, if four people sit down at my restaurant and order a cacio e pepe and a bottle of water, I'll go and talk to them. There's a limit. Now I've also decided to focus on tasting menus."

During his career, some of Borghese's views and statements attracted criticism or controversy. One notable case was in October 2021 when he caused a stir, stating: "Today, those who enter this profession want guarantees, higher salaries, regulated shifts. I can't find staff; few really want to be a chef." Further criticism ensued in April 2022, when he stated: "Do you want to be Alessandro Borghese? You have to work hard. No one has ever given me anything for free. I've broken my back for this job, which requires sacrifice and dedication." The Unione Sindacale di Base (USB) in Livorno, where Borghese was visiting to film a new episode of 4 ristoranti in June 2022, issued banners stating "Work must always be paid. You're not welcome" (Il lavoro si paga, sempre. Non sei il benvenuto). The USB stated: "A few months ago, Borghese made his debut with a few words in defense of those restaurateurs who decide not to pay their employees because they 'have to learn' a trade. We would like to remind Borghese that unpaid labor (and in our country it exists in various sectors) is called exploitation. Work must always be paid for." The protest, fueled by banners, was sparked by an interview with the Corriere della Sera in which Borghese and other chefs, including several Michelin-starred ones, complained about the inability to find staff to join their kitchen or dining room teams. While discussing the difficulty in finding talent for his business, Borghese made a comment about his working experience, which subsequently sparked a heated debate. He had stated: "I may be unpopular, but I have no problem saying that working to learn doesn't necessarily mean getting paid. I worked on cruise ships with 'only' paid room and board. That's it. I was fine with that: the opportunity was worth the salary." Further criticism from people in Livorno came when Borghese, while filming the February 2025 episode in Pisa, appeared to attribute the cacciucco to Pisa rather than Livorno.

== Personal life ==
In July 2009, Borghese married Wilma Oliverio (born 1975), a former model and businesswoman. The two first met during an interview in 2008, when Oliverio, who at that time was in the commercial sector as a manager of Digital Bros in Milan, called him to create a culinary-themed video game. Borghese said that he was never engaged and only had flings or affairs before he met Olivero, and ended up marrying her after nine months. About the wedding proposal, he said: "We were on a trip, we'd just met. There was a bit of turbulence on the plane. There were a few seats available, and I said, 'Wilma, are we moving?' [Wilma, ci spostiamo?] And she understood: 'We're getting married.' [Ci sposiamo] She threw her arms around me and said, 'Yes.'" Their wedding ceremony was held in the Sanctuary of the Madonna del Roseto in Solopaca on 25 July. From their marriage, two daughters were born and named Alexandra (born 2012) and Arizona (born 2016). In an interview with la Repubblica in December 2019, Borghese revealed that he also had a son, named Gabriel (born 2006), from a relationship with another woman and of whom he learned he was the father after a long time. Borghese recognized the son but was yet to have the opportunity to see him in person. In March 2021, he tested positive for COVID-19. In July 2021, Borghese said that in city he travels with electric cars, his Volkswagen Polo, or use one of his motorbikes due to parking and traffic problems, while his family car is a Jeep, joking that "having two daughters and a wife, practically the whole car is for their suitcases."

Unlike some of his fellow celebrity chefs, Borghese said that he does not consider himself to be a tifoso of a football club, with his real passion being motorsport, especially Grand Prix motorcycle racing including Moto GP and Superbike racing, as well as Formula One, the 24 Hours of Le Mans, and rallying, particularly loving the Lancia Delta HF Integrale Evoluzione and the Lancia Thema Ferrari. With Kevin Schwantz as his first idol, he grew up as fan of Valentino Rossi and saw Francesco Bagnaia as a possible heir. At the same time, he admired Scuderia Ferrari during the 1980s when Ayrton Senna, Alain Prost, and Michele Alboreto were still driving, stating that the world of motorsport was "completely different from today". Owing to his Neapolitan father, he said that he sympathizes with SSC Napoli, a club also supported by Cannavacciuolo and Esposito. In October 2021, he said that if Napoli were to win the 2021–22 Serie A league season and their third Scudetto, he would be "delighted, being a mixed-blood Neapolitan" and he would make "the pasta and potatoes I made at Frank Matano's house when I filmed Game of Talent. My uncle Tonino, a true Neapolitan, taught me it many, many years ago, and it's a cornerstone of Neapolitan home cooking."

Of his motorsport passion, Borghese said: "Blood and motor oil flow through my veins!" He cited his grandfather Vincenzo Borghese, who owned the Borghese auto parts shop on Riviera di Chiaia and was also a racing driver, competing in Grand Prix races and losing his life during a race. This passion was passed on him by his father, who also grew up in a garage, racing motorcycles including the Milan-Taranto with Ducati, Harley-Davidson, Suzuki, and Yamaha, as well as an Italian Championship in 125cc and 175cc classes, and being passionate about cars as an owner of an Alfa Romeo Giulietta Spider that he raced on the autostrade of Italy, which is the national system of motorways; his father also owned a Mercedes-Benz W126 (560S SEC), a Lamborghini Espada, and a Ferrari 288 GTO. Borghese said that he is a fan of open mufflers and souped-up scooters. He started motocross on a Kawasaki KX125, then moved on to a KX250 and a Honda CR250, before he started doing track racing on a Hornet 600 and 900.

An owner of Honda VTR 1000, Yamaha RD350, Suzuki Gamma 250, and supermoto, such as those of Husqvarna Motorcycles, Borghese eventually switched to Harleys to "enjoy the freedom of a motorcyclist with the satisfaction of a twin-cylinder". After the birth of his daughters, he said that he "calmed down; my setup went from two to four wheels." While in Monza in late 2019, he told Guido Meda, who was telling him about a vintage motorcycle competition that he was going to participate in as he still "butt heads with twenty-year-olds on motorcycles", that he "butt heads with twenty-year-olds on Porsches on the track, and it hurts less", and commented: "It's a passion that's still alive and burning inside me." He said that his Porsche 911 GT3 is like'spaghetti al pomodoro, and also tested a Porsche Taycan to try an electric motor car, being pleasantly surprised, while stating that he remained what in the United States call "a petrolhead". Borghese thought about combining cooking and motoring in a TV show, stating that it is an idea that "often comes up: a road trip on two or four wheels in search of flavor! I'm convinced, however, that today we need a MasterChef dedicated to the dining room because everyone wants to be a chef and no one wants to be a waiter. The dining room is the front line, welcoming customers, explaining, and sharing what we do in the kitchen. It's a sector where we're in dire straits; in Milan, we're short at least two thousand waiters: it's not just my problem, it's common to all my colleagues. It's a job that no one wants to do."

== Television ==
- Cortesie per gli ospiti (Real Time, 2005–2012)
- L'ost (Real Time, 2005)
- Cuoco gentiluomo (Real Time, 2006)
- Chef per un giorno (La7, 2007–2011)
- Chef a domicilio (Real Time, 2009)
- Ci vediamo domenica (Rai 2, 2009)
- Fuori menù (Real Time, 2009–2012)
- Cuochi e fiamme (La7, 2010)
- Cortesie per gli ospiti New York (Real Time, 2010)
- Lasciami cantare! (Rai 1, 2011) – competitor
- La notte degli chef (Canale 5, 2011) – judge
- Cucina con Ale (Real Time, 2011–2013)
- Ale contro tutti (Sky Uno, 2012–2013)
- Junior MasterChef Italia (Sky Uno, 2014–2016) – judge
- Star Wars Rebels, voice actor of Morad Sumar
- Alessandro Borghese – 4 ristoranti (TV8/Sky Uno, since 2015)
- Kitchen Sound (Sky Uno, since 2015)
- Cuochi d'Italia (TV8, 2017–2019; 2021)
- Miss Italia (La7, 2018) – juror
- Kitchen Duel (Sky Uno, since 2019)
- Alessandro Borghese Kitchen Podcast (Dopcast, 2020–2021) – ten-episode podcast
- C come Contrappasso di Alessandro Borghese (Dopcast, 2021) – one-episode podcast
- Cuochi d'Italia: Speciale Natale 2020 (TV8/Sky Uno, 2021)
- Alessandro Borghese – Piatto ricco (TV8/Sky Uno, 2021)
- Game of Talents (TV8/Sky Uno, 2021)
- Alessandro Borghese – Celebrity Chef (TV8/Sky Uno, since 2022)
- RIP: Roast in Peace (Prime Video, 2026)

== Books ==
- — (2009). L'abito non fa il cuoco. La cucina italiana di uno chef gentiluomo (in Italian). Milan: Rizzoli. ISBN 978-88-17-03538-5.
- — (2013). Tu come lo fai? I tuoi piatti preferiti in più di 100 ricette dello chef (in Italian). Milan: Mondadori. ISBN 978-88-04-63353-2.
- — (2014). Kitchen Shuffle. Storie di cucina in musica (in Italian). Milan: Columbia. ASIN B00IA9XTT2. ISBN 978-88-91-81179-0.
- — (2017). Alessandro Borghese Kitchen Sound. Senti come suona questo piatto! (in Italian). Milan: Mondadori Electa. ISBN 978-88-918-1179-0.
- — Frenda, Angela (2018). Cacio&Pepe. La mia vita in 50 ricette (in Italian). Milan: Solferino. ISBN 978-88-282-0072-7.
- — (2019). Alessandro Borghese. 4 ristoranti. Il libro guida ai ristoranti del programma (in Italian). Milan: Mondadori Electa. ISBN 978-88-918-2161-4.
