= Jansma =

Jansma is a West Frisian patronymic surname cognate to "Johnson". People with this surname include:

- Bintje Jansma (1888–1976), Dutch school student after whom her teacher named the potato cultivar Bintje
- Esther Jansma (1958–2025), Dutch writer and archaeologist
- Jan Jansma (born 1962), Dutch bridge player
- Kristopher Jansma (born 1982), American writer and novelist
- Rik Jansma (born before 2006), Dutch chef and co-founder of the restaurant Basiliek in Harderwijk, Netherlands
- Sijtse Jansma (1898–1977), Dutch tug of war competitor
- Sybren Jansma (born 1982), Dutch bobsledder
- Timothy J. Jansma (1952–2006), American luthier
