= Dan Lepard =

Australian baker, food writer, photographer, television presenter and celebrity chef

- Born: Melbourne, Victoria, Australia
- Spouse: David Whitehouse
- Website: www.danlepard.com

Dan Lepard is an Australian baker, food writer, photographer, television presenter and celebrity chef. He was previously a fashion photographer working for Italian Vogue

== Biography ==
In 1992 Lepard became a pastry chef for Alastair Little in Soho, London even though he had no formal training. He then worked for David Hockney as a chef in both London and Los Angeles. He started working as a baker and consultant at Baker & Spice Bakery in 1997. At his time at Baker & Spice he worked with Sami Tamimi, Yotam Ottolenghi, and Jim Webb (head viennoiserie chef). Lepard has founded bakeries for Fergus Henderson at St John, John Torode at Mezzo, Tony Kitous at Levant and Giorgio Locatelli at Locanda Locatelli and Zafferano.

In 2003 Lepard was the winner of the Outstanding Contribution to London Restaurants at the London Restaurant Awards. In 2012, he created the pop-up bakery The Loaf in a Box in San Sebastián, Spain.

From 2005 through to September 2013 he wrote a weekly baking column in The Guardian called How to Bake. He also writes for Waitrose Magazine, Sainsbury's Magazine, and Delicious Magazine (UK). In Australia Lepard writes for Gourmet Traveller Magazine. In 2014 Dan started to write a cookery column for The Sydney Morning Herald and The Age in Melbourne

In 2013 Lepard featured as a judge alongside Kerry Vincent on The Great Australian Bake Off, on Nine Network in Australia. This was the first series and is based on the popular British format The Great British Bake Off. In the UK he appears as a guest chef on Channel Four's Sunday Brunch.

== Personal life ==
Lepard has lived in London since his late teens. In 2012 Dan Lepard entered into a civil partnership with his long-term partner and business manager David Whitehouse.

== Bibliography ==
- Baking with Passion (1999) – winner of the Guild of Food Writers' Cook Book of the Year Award
- The Handmade Loaf (2004) – shortlisted for a Guild of Food Writers Award and a World Food Media Award
- The Cook's Book: Step-by-step techniques & recipes for success every time from the world's top chefs (2005) – author of the baking section – winner of the James Beard Foundation Book Award
- Dictionnaire Universel du Pain (2010) – author of the British section
- Exceptional Cakes: Baker & Spice (2007) – co-wrote with Richard Whittington
- Exceptional Breads: Baker & Spice (2007) – co-wrote with Richard Whittington
- Short and Sweet (2011) – winner of the André Simon Award for Cookbook of the Year
- Comptoir Libanais (2013) – co-wrote with Tony Kitous
- Comptoir Libanais Express (2014) – co-wrote with Tony Kitous

== Photographer ==
- Made in Italy: Food and Stories (2006) – winner of the Glenfiddich and World Gourmand awards
- Hawksmoor at Home: Meat – Seafood – Sides – Breakfasts – Puddings – Cocktails (2011)
