= Bruno Barbieri =

Italian chef (born 1962)

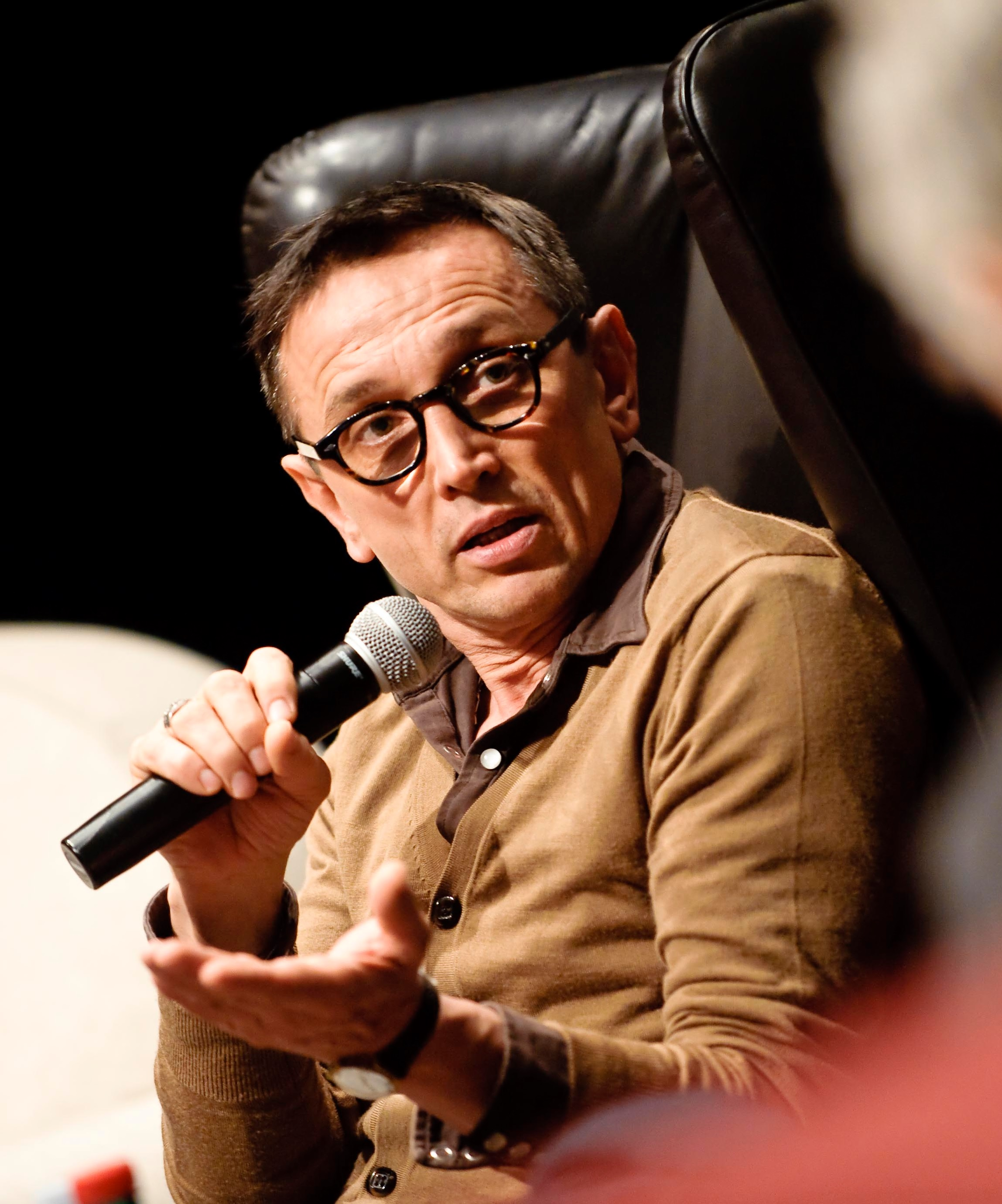
- Barbieri in 2012
- Born: 12 January 1962 (age 64); Medicina, Emilia-Romagna, Italy
- Culinary career
- Cooking style: Italian
- Current restaurants: Locanda Solarola; Il Trigabolo; La Grotta; Arquade; Fourghetti
- Television shows: MasterChef Italia (2011–present); Junior MasterChef Italia (2014–2016); Quelli che... il calcio (2015–2016); MasterChef Italia Celebrity (2017–2018); Bruno Barbieri - 4 hotel (2018–present); MasterChef Italia All-Stars (2018–2019); Cuochi d'Italia - Il campionato del mondo (2020); Cuochi d'Italia - Il campionato delle coppie (2021–present)
- Website: www.brunobarbieri.blog

Bruno Barbieri (born 12 January 1962) is an Italian chef, restaurateur and television personality.

Barbieri's restaurants won 7 Michelin stars, which makes him one of the best-known chefs in Italy and the world. He is the author of popular Italian shows, including MasterChef Italia, and the Celebrity, Junior and All Stars versions with other popular television chefs, including Carlo Cracco, Antonino Cannavacciuolo, Joe Bastianich, Giorgio Locatelli, Alessandro Borghese, Lidia Bastianich and Antonia Klugmann. He is the creator of the talent show Bruno Barbieri - 4 hotels, a spin-off of Alessandro Borghese - 4 ristoranti.

== Early life ==
Barbieri was born on 12 January 1962 in the municipality of Medicina, Emilia-Romagna. His father moved to Spain when Barbieri was 7 years old, and remained there for 15 years; his mother worked in the textile industry and transmitted him the passion for fashion, instead his grandmother transmitted him the passion for food and cuisine. He graduated from a hospitality vocational high school (istituto alberghiero) in Bologna.

== Career ==
After following advanced courses abroad, he started working for the restaurant Locanda Solarola, in Castel Guelfo di Bologna. In two years, the restaurant earned two Michelin stars. He then worked for the restaurant Il Trigabolo, in Argenta, Emilia–Romagna, with chef and later friend Igles Corelli, assisted by Giacinto Rossetti and Mauro Gualandi.

In 2002, he opened Arquade, a restaurant in Hotel Villa del Quar-Relais and Châteaux in San Pietro in Cariano, Veneto. In 2006, the restaurant received two Michelin stars and 3 Gambero Rosso forchette ('forks'). He left the restaurant in July 2010 and moved to Brazil. In March 2012, he returned to Europe and opened the Cotidie restaurant in London, which he lent to chef Marco Tozzi in 2013 due to his excessive work activities. In 2016, he opened the restaurant Fourghetti, in Bologna, which he lent to Erik Lavacchielli in August 2020.

His books include one dedicated to gluten-free cuisine, written in 2007. He participates in many TV programmes for the Gambero Rosso Channel and collaborates with various radios. He is the author of the successful cuisine series MasterChef Italia, which he has hosted since 2011 alongside other famous Italian chefs. This show steeply escalated Barbieri's fame in the cultural landscape of Italy. Since 2018, he's been host of the show Bruno Barbieri - 4 Hotel.

== Personal life ==
Barbieri is not married. He had a difficult time with his father because he didn't like the idea of him becoming a chef. He is an avid supporter of the soccer team Inter Milan, and he played soccer when he was young. He said that his dream is to cook for Queen Elizabeth II and to cook or make a movie with Johnny Depp.

== Restaurants and awards ==
Barbieri's restaurants have been awarded with a total of 7 Michelin stars and 3 Gambero Rosso forchette ('forks').

- Cotidie, London – closed
- Locanda Solarola, Castel Guelfo di Bologna
- Il Trigabolo, Argenta
- La Grotta, Brisighella
- Arquade, San Pietro in Cariano
- Fourghetti, Bologna

== Television ==
- MasterChef Italia (2011–present)
- Junior MasterChef Italia (2014–2016)
- Quelli che... il Calcio (2015–2016)
- MasterChef Italia Celebrity (2017–2018)
- Bruno Barbieri - 4 hotel (2018–present)
- MasterChef Italia All-Stars (2018–2019)
- Cuochi d'Italia - Il campionato del mondo (2020)
- Cuochi d'Italia - Il campionato delle coppie (2021–present)

== Bibliography ==
Media related to Bruno Barbieri at Wikimedia Commons

- Bruno Barbieri (2005). Tegami. Bibliotheca Culinaria. ISBN 978-8886174725.
- Bruno Barbieri (2006). L'uva nel piatto. Bibliotheca Culinaria. ISBN 978-8886174909.
- Bruno Barbieri; Renzo Chiesa (2006). Mangiare da cani.
- Bruno Barbieri (2007). Squisitamente senza glutine. Bibliotheca Culinaria. ISBN 978-8895056111.
- Bruno Barbieri (2008). Polpette, che passione!. Bibliotheca Culinaria. ISBN 978-8895056272.
- Bruno Barbieri (2008). Fuori dal guscio. Bibliotheca Culinaria. ISBN 978-8895056180.
- Bruno Barbieri (2009). Cipolle buone da far piangere. Bibliotheca Culinaria. ISBN 978-8895056463.
- Bruno Barbieri (2009). Ripieni di bontà. Bibliotheca Culinaria. ISBN 978-8895056494.
- Bruno Barbieri (2010). Tajine senza frontiere. Bibliotheca Culinaria. ISBN 978-8895056630.
- Bruno Barbieri (2012). Pasta al forno e gratin. Bibliotheca Culinaria. ISBN 978-8895056852.
- Bruno Barbieri (2014). Via Emilia, via da casa. Rizzoli. ISBN 978-8817084017.
- Bruno Barbieri (2015). Cerco sapori in piazza Grande. 70 ingredienti per 70 ricette. Rizzoli. ISBN 978-8817088176.
- Bruno Barbieri (2019). Domani sarà più buono. Da ogni piatto possono nascere nuove ricette. Mondadori Electa. ISBN 978-8891819222.
