= MasterChef Italia =

- Genre: Cookery
- Based on: MasterChef
- Directed by: Umberto Spinazzola
- Judges: Bruno Barbieri; Carlo Cracco (until 6th season); Joe Bastianich (until 8th season); Antonino Cannavacciuolo (from 5th season); Antonia Klugmann (7th season); Giorgio Locatelli (from the 8th season)
- Country of origin: Italy
- Original language: Italian
- No. of seasons: 15
- No. of episodes: 170

Production
- Running time: 1 hour and 10 minutes
- Production companies: Magnolia (seasons 1–5); Endemol Shine Italia (season 6–)

Original release
- Network: Sky Uno (rerun ed.1, edition 2+); Cielo (edition 1, rerun ed. 2+)
- Release: 21 September 2011 – present

MasterChef Italia is the Italian version of culinary talent show MasterChef. The first edition was aired from 21 September to 7 December 2011 on Sky Uno.

The judges are chefs Bruno Barbieri, Carlo Cracco, Antonino Cannavacciuolo by the fifth edition and restaurateur Joe Bastianich (judge of MasterChef U.S.). Voiceovers are made by Simone D'Andrea and Luisa Ziliotto for the first five editions, Stefania Nali for the sixth and seventh and Ilaria Egitto from the eighth. Carlo Cracco quit the program after the end of 6th season and was replaced by Antonia Klugmann in the 7th. Antonia Klugmann was in turn replaced by Giorgio Locatelli for Season 8.

MasterChef Italia winners earn €100,000 in gold coins and get to publish a recipe book (published by RCS Rizzoli).

The success of the first edition included parodies of the program, including The Scoured, Crozza in Wonderland and Made in Sud with the parody Mastrochef

== Format ==
- Mystery Box Challenge: participants have to prepare a dish following the instructions of the judges and the ingredients contained in their Mystery Boxes. The judges taste the three most interesting dishes, and the winner is given an advantage for the next challenge.
- Invention Test: the participants have to re-create a dish decided by the judges or, often, by a guest (including renowned figures such as Marco Pierre White, Masaharu Morimoto and Matt Preston). The winner of the Mystery Box Challenge is given an advantage over the other participants, which could go as far as being exempted from the challenge. The duration of this test is variable, and here the judges, after tasting all dishes, nominate the winner of the test (who can choose their own team in the challenge in external as well as having other benefits) and the three cooks with the worst outcome, and between them at least one is eliminated (sometimes the others are sent directly to the Pressure Test).
- Team Challenge: in this test, the candidates are divided into two teams (or challenge each other) and have to prepare dishes to be served in a particular situation, usually outside MasterChef's kitchen, and for a considerable number of people, ranging from 100 to 10. MasterChef Italia has visited several locations in Italy and abroad, including Norwegian fjords, the Vatican, Naples. The winner of the invention test can choose the components of either teams and, at times, the courses to prepare, or have other particular advantages, such as advice from local chefs. The winning team will be voted upon by the guests they prepared food for, by simple majority.
- Pressure Test: the members of the losing team will compete against each other in a task (or set of tasks), usually with a very strict time limit, until at least one of them is eliminated.
- Duel: if foreseen, the worst competitor in the Invention Test and the worst competitor in the Pressure Test or the two worst competitors in the Pressure Test compete in a very demanding test with very little time available, at the end of which one of the two is eliminated.
- Skill Test: present since the ninth edition and alternated in the episodes with the sequence of Team Challenge and Pressure Test, requires the competitors to take a surprise exam on a specific skill, divided into three steps, each assigned to a judge, where the worst is eliminated.
- Golden Mystery Box: the competitors must create a dish using all or some of the ingredients found inside a box, often with unexpected events and additional rules that make everything more difficult, regarding the particular cooking technique or the obligatory or prohibited use of a particular ingredient or tool. At the end of the test, the judges move between the stations to observe the dishes and then taste the best dishes, usually more than 3. The winners go up to the balcony and directly access the outdoor test or the next Skill Test.
- Black Mystery Box: the competitors must create a dish using all or some of the ingredients found inside a box, often with unexpected events and additional rules that make everything more difficult, regarding the particular cooking technique or the obligatory or prohibited use of a particular ingredient or tool. At the end of the test, the judges move between the stations to observe the dishes and the winning competitor receives a lesson in the MasterChef Magazine. The judges then call the worst dishes, and the 3 worst will face a Pressure Test.
- Stress Test: introduced in the thirteenth edition, competitors must pass a skills exam in 10 minutes, to demonstrate that they are able to work under pressure. The test is led by a "shadow" chef whose identity is revealed shortly before the start of the test.
- The Final: in the Season Finale, the two (or three) remaining participants face each other in a 2-hour long duel, during which they have to serve their own degustation menu, composed of at least four courses.

== Season One ==
The first season of MasterChef Italy aired from 21 September to 7 December in 2011 on Sky and saw Spyros Theodoridis come out the winner. In addition, on 21 and 28 December, two special episodes were aired dedicated to the background and to the comments of the protagonists.

=== Contestants ===
Contestant	Age	Occupation	Origin	Status	Place
Fred Reitsma	58	Trade agent	Livorno, Tuscany	Eliminated 1st	18th
Paolo Vidoz	40	Former boxer and farmer	Gorizia, Friuli-Venezia Giulia	Eliminated 2nd	17th
Marìka Gennari	30	Athlete	Novara, Piedmont	Eliminated 3rd	16th
Davide Spadoni	23	Employee	La Spezia, Liguria	Eliminated 4th	15th
Diego Spatari	40	Skipper	Florence, Tuscany	Eliminated 5th	14th
Alessandro de Sio	27	Bartender	Salerno, Campania	Eliminated 6th	13th
Agnese Malatesti	33	Event organizer	Rome, Lazio	Eliminated 7th	12th
Giada Serra	20	Oriental language student	Varese, Lombardy	Eliminated 8th	11th
Anna Lupi	48	Former dancer	Verona, Veneto	Eliminated 9th	10th
Enea Mazzoleni	23	Architectonic restorer	Bergamo, Lombardy	Eliminated 10th	9th
Chiara Orioli	26	Personal trainer	Brescia, Lombardy	Eliminated 11th	8th
Alberico Nunziata	34	Air Force sergeant	Rome, Lazio	Eliminated 12th	7th
Federico Stefanini	28	3D Graphic designer	Parma, Emilia-Romagna	Eliminated 13th	6th
Giuseppe Danny D'Annibale	30	Engineering student	Rome, Lazio	Eliminated 14th	5th
Immacolata Imma Gargiulo	38	Housewife	Naples, Campania	Eliminated 15th	4th
Ilenia Bazzacco	38	Housewife	Treviso, Veneto	Eliminated 16th	3rd
Luisa Cuozzo	23	Political science student	Naples, Campania	Runner-up	2nd
Spyros Theodoridis	37	Employee	Modena, Emilia-Romagna	Winner	1st

== Season Two ==
In February 2012 Sky Italy opened up the casting for the second edition.

The winner of the second edition was attorney Tiziana Stefanelli. Unlike the previous edition, the first MasterChef aired on Sky One from 13 December 2012 to 21 February 2013. On days 19, 20 and 21 November 2012, three special introductory episodes had aired: Joe Bastianich: Family Affairs, Carlo Cracco:The Squaring Of The Egg and Bruno Barbieri: Chef 7-Star. In addition, the three judges were guests in an episode of X Factor Italy, of That Heavenly Goal! and The Barbarian Invasions.

=== Contestants ===
Contestant	Age	Occupation	Origin	Status	Place
Giorgio Gramegna	32	Graphic designer	Novara, Piedmont	Eliminated 1st	18th
Regina Finocchiaro	23	Engineering student	Acireale, Sicily	Eliminated 2nd	17th
Margherita Rigotti	26	Unemployed	Trento, Trentino-Alto Adige	Eliminated 3rd	16th
Federico Bonadies	33	Engineer	Bari, Apulia	Eliminated 4th	15th
Giorgio Anthony Ruggeri	29	Agriculture student	Ragusa, Sicily	Eliminated 5th	14th
Letizia Fidotti	24	Law student	Rome, Lazio	Eliminated 6th	13th
Guido D'Eramo	48	Plumber	Rome, Lazio	Eliminated 7th	12th
Suien Sani	25	Unemployed	Pistoia, Tuscany	Eliminated 8th	11th
Agnese Gullotta	22	Psychology student	Misterbianco, Sicily	Eliminated 9th	10th
Michele Bendini	34	Veterinarian	Città di Castello, Umbria	Eliminated 10th	9th
Nicola Dragani	41	Kitchen hand	Pescara, Abruzzo	Eliminated 11th	8th
Paola Galloni	39	Housewife	Milan, Lombardy	Eliminated 12th	7th
Daiana Cecconi	53	Housewife	Follonica, Tuscany	Eliminated 13th	6th
Marika Elefante	27	Educational Sciences student	Naples, Campania	Eliminated 14th	5th
Ivan Iurato	35	Employee	Comiso, Sicily	Eliminated 15th	4th
Andrea Marconetti	37	Computer programmer	Vimodrone, Lombardy	Eliminated 16th	3rd
Maurizio Rosazza Prin	33	Painter and copywriter	Como, Lombardy	Runner-up	2nd
Tiziana Stefanelli	41	Lawyer	Rome, Lazio	Winner	1st

== Season Three ==
In February 2013 casting opened for the third edition. The race started 19 December 2013 and ended on 6 March 2014. The winner of the third edition was Francesco Federico Ferrero, a medical intern. Unlike the other two editions, the winner was announced live at the General Stores in Milan. The season will be broadcast again on Cielo, a DTV channel, in September 2014.

=== Contestants ===
Contestant	Age	Occupation	Origin	Status	Place
Margherita Cicinelli	18	High school student	Giovinazzo, Apulia	Eliminated 1st	20th
Haeri Youn	31	Housewife	Pioltello, Lombardy	Eliminated 2nd	19th
Daniele Pietrobelli	29	Videogames developer	Schio, Veneto	Eliminated 3rd	18th
Giovanna Walendziak	35	Employee	Altavilla Vicentina, Veneto	Eliminated 4th	17th
Jessica Rizzetto	25	Worker	Pordenone, Friuli-Venezia Giulia	Eliminated 5th	16th
Giorgio Deriu	25	Law student	Melendugno, Apulia	Eliminated 6th	15th
Laura Castrataro	48	Unemployed	Rocchetta a Volturno, Molise	Eliminated 7th	14th
Michele Guida	45	Worker	Ordona, Apulia	Eliminated 8th	13th
Ludovica Baiocco	30	Housewife	Montecosaro, Marche	Eliminated 9th	12th
Marco Gianfreda	39	Director	Rome, Lazio	Eliminated 10th	11th
Emma Sarr	27	Unemployed	Fossano, Piedmont	Eliminated 11th	10th
Beatrice De Tullio	23	Management student	Pescara, Abruzzo	Eliminated 12th	9th
Michele Cannistraro	35	Foreman	Rozzano, Lombardy	Eliminated 13th	8th
Alberto Naponi	69	Retired	Cremona, Lombardy	Eliminated 14th	7th
Rachida Karrati	48	Seamstress	Sorisole, Lombardy	Eliminated 15th	6th
Eleonora Federici	35	Gemologist	Pavia, Lombardy	Eliminated 16th	5th
Salvatore Russo	40	Sea captain	Piano di Sorrento, Campania	Eliminated 17th	4th
Enrica Della Martira	32	Sales representative	Florence, Tuscany	Eliminated 18th	3rd
Almo Bibolotti	39	Dog hotelier	Bari, Apulia	Runner-up	2nd
Federico Francesco Ferrero	39	Nutritionist doctor	Turin, Piedmont	Winner	1st

== Season Four ==
In February 2014 casting opened for the fourth season scheduled for the second half of 2014 again on Sky Uno. Filming of these episodes will begin in June. MasterChef Italy started on 18 December 2014 and the winner was Stefano Callegaro. The winner's name was leaked by the media and published before the final episode of the season.

=== Contestants ===
Contestant	Age	Occupation	Origin	Status	Place
Gabriele Costantino	46	Business consultant	Arezzo, Tuscany	Eliminated 1st	20th
Alessandro Clementi	31	Employee	Dairago, Lombardy	Eliminated 2nd	19th
Carmine Giovinazzo	30	Trucker	Codevigo, Veneto	Eliminated 3rd	18th
Ilaria Carratù	24	Sales representative	Naples, Campania	Eliminated 4th	17th
Serena De Maio	25	Unemployed	Vicenza, Veneto	Eliminated 5th	16th
Fabiano Mantovan	41	Craftsman	Porto Viro, Veneto	Eliminated 6th	15th
Viola Melania Berti	20	Barlady	Milan, Lombardy	Eliminated 7th	14th
Chiara Zanotti	37	Travel agent	Monterotondo, Lazio	Eliminated 8th	13th
Silvana Amodeo	32	Housewife	Bitonto, Apulia	Eliminated 9th	12th
Giuseppe Garozzo Zannini Quirini	50	Civil servant	Rome, Lazio	Eliminated 10th	11th
Filippo Cassano	40	Project manager	Rome, Lazio	Eliminated 11th	10th
Valentina Pozzato	29	Nurse	Biella, Piedmont	Eliminated 12th	9th
Simone Finetti	24	Electrician	Argenta, Emilia-Romagna	Eliminated 13th	8th
Federica Fiocchetti	32	Housewife	Padenghe sul Garda, Lombardy	Eliminated 14th	7th
Maria Acquaroli	27	Wedding planner	Bergamo, Lombardy	Eliminated 15th	6th
Arianna Contenti	42	Bank clerk	Rome, Lazio	Eliminated 16th	5th
Paolo Armando	42	Computer technician and catechist	Cuneo, Piedmont	Eliminated 17th	4th
Amelia Falco	26	Economics student	Piana di Monte Verna, Campania	Eliminated 18th	3rd
Nicolò Pietro Prati	21	Agriculture student	Milan, Lombardy	Runner-up	2nd
Stefano Callegaro	43	Realtor	Adria, Veneto	Winner	1st

== Season Five ==
In February 2015 casting opened for the fifth season started on 18 December 2015, on Sky Uno. By this season there was a new entry, Antonino Cannavacciuolo as a new judge. The Season Finale aired on 3 March 2016, and the winner was Erica Liverani.

=== Contestants ===
Contestant	Age	Occupation	Origin	Status	Place
Jacopo Maraldi	22	Law student	Cesenatico, Emilia-Romagna	Eliminated 1st	20th
Ivana Fulvia Acciaioli	61	Retired teacher	Prato, Tuscany	Eliminated 2nd	19th
Sabina Babura	22	Housewife	Pavullo nel Frignano, Emilia-Romagna	Eliminated 3rd	18th
Francesco Amato	48	Employee	Mestre, Veneto	Eliminated 4th	17th
Beatrice Ronconi	24	Pig farmer	Marmirolo, Lombardy	Eliminated 5th	16th
Alice Pasquato	29	Marketing manager	Brenta, Lombardy	Eliminated 6th	15th
Luigi Muraro	24	Graphic designer	Zevio, Veneto	Eliminated 7th	14th
Maria "Marzia" Bellino	57	Pharmacist	Casola Valsenio, Emilia-Romagna	Eliminated 8th	13th
Laura Duchini	40	Unemployed	Bellinzona, Ticino	Eliminated 9th	12th
Andrea Torelli	33	Photographer	Borgo Valsugana, Trentino-Alto Adige	Eliminated 10th	11th
Giovanni Gaetani	26	PhD student in philosophy	Gaeta, Lazio	Eliminated 11th	10th
Mattia D'Agostini	21	Waiter	Selvazzano Dentro, Veneto	Eliminated 12th	9th
Sylvie Rondeau	47	Fashion designer	Casciago, Lombardy	Eliminated 13th	8th
Rubina Rovini	34	Unemployed	Pontedera, Tuscany	Eliminated 14th	7th
Dario Baruffa	29	Gas station attendant	Berra, Emilia-Romagna	Eliminated 15th	6th
Lucia Giorgi	50	Shop assistant	Brescia, Lombardy	Eliminated 16th	5th
Maradona Youssef	28	Educational Sciences student	Trieste, Friuli-Venezia Giulia	Eliminated 17th	4th
Lorenzo De Guio	23	Butcher	Roana, Veneto	Eliminated 18th	3rd
Alida Gotta	25	Unemployed	Turin, Piedmont	Runner-up	2nd
Erica Liverani	30	Physiotherapist	Ravenna, Emilia-Romagna	Winner	1st

== Season Six ==
In February 2016 casting opened for the sixth season scheduled for the second half of 2016 on Sky Uno. The winner of this season was the youngest winner in MasterChef Italia History, Valerio Braschi (18 years old).

=== Contestants ===
Contestant	Age	Occupation	Origin	Status	Place
Alves "Lalla" Pedriali	61	Retired teacher	Cesena, Emilia-Romagna	Eliminated 1st	20th
Antonella Orsino	37	Accountant	Cusano Mutri, Campania	Eliminated 2nd	19th
Vittoria Polloni	29	Store manager	Brescia, Lombardy	Eliminated 3rd	18th
Alain Stratta	33	Insurance adjuster	Donnas, Aosta Valley	Eliminated 4th	17th
Marco Moreschi	40	Entrepreneur	Gussago, Lombardy	Eliminated 5th	16th
Marco Vandoni	37	Manager	Milan, Lombardy	Eliminated 6th	15th
Barbara D'Aniello	44	Beautician	Verona, Veneto	Eliminated 7th	14th
Maria Zaccagni	29	Employee	Bari, Apulia	Eliminated 8th	13th
Daniele Cui	37	Stay-at-home dad	Selargius, Sardinia	Eliminated 9th	12th
Roberto Perugini	36	Worker	Predappio, Emilia-Romagna	Eliminated 10th	11th
Mariangela Gigante	39	Criminal lawyer	Castellaneta, Apulia	Eliminated 11th	10th
Giulia Brandi	30	Shop keeper	Fermignano, Marche	Eliminated 12th	9th
Gabriele Gatti	46	Architect	Turin, Piedmont	Eliminated 13th	8th
Michele Pirozzi	34	Funeral item representative	San Felice a Cancello, Campania	Eliminated 14th	7th
Michele Ghedini	21	High school student	Porto Mantovano, Lombardy	Eliminated 15th	6th
Loredana Martori	38	Architecture consultant	San Giorgio Morgeto, Calabria	Eliminated 16th	5th
Margherita Russo	27	Law student	Palermo, Sicily	Eliminated 17th	4th
Gloria Enrico	24	Barlady	Tovo San Giacomo, Liguria	Runner-up	2nd
Cristina Nicolini	25	Practicing lawyer	Fiorentino, San Marino	Runner-up	2nd
Valerio Braschi	18	High school student	Santarcangelo di Romagna, Emilia-Romagna	Winner	1st

== Season Seven ==
In February 2017 casting opened for the seventh season scheduled for the end of the year. The 7th season started airing in December 2017 until April 2018. Carlo Cracco was replaced by the first woman judge, Antonia Klugmann. This edition was won by Simone Scipioni.

=== Contestants ===
Contestant	Age	Occupation	Origin	Status	Place
Simonetta Piccardo	47	Unemployed	Genova, Liguria	Eliminated 1st	22nd
Tiziana Sassi	43	Housewife	Romano di Lombardia, Lombardy	Eliminated 2nd	21st
Eri Koishi	45	Self-employed	Trieste, Friuli-Venezia Giulia	Eliminated 3rd	20th
Jose Oppi	27	Musician	Massarosa, Tuscany	Eliminated 4th	19th
Stefano Biondi	20	Civil engineering student	Cagliari, Sardinia	Eliminated 5th	18th
Michele Sardo	35	Cruise ship personnel	Trieste, Friuli-Venezia Giulia	Eliminated 6th	17th
Rocco Buffone	28	Chemistry teacher	Amantea, Calabria	Eliminated 7th	16th
Joayda Herrera	31	Shop keeper	Campobasso, Molise	Eliminated 8th	15th
Matteo Marchetto	56	Physical education teacher	Sovizzo, Veneto	Eliminated 9th	14th
Italo Screpanti	74	Retired airplane pilot	Pedaso, Marche	Eliminated 10th	13th
Giovanna Rosanio	50	Kindergarten teacher	Deruta, Umbria	Eliminated 11th	12th
Manuela Costantini	36	Real estate consultant	Ascoli Piceno, Marche	Eliminated 12th	11th
Fabrizio Ferri	53	Egg carrier	Pescara, Abruzzo	Eliminated 13th	10th
Ludovica Starita	19	Linguistic mediation student	Rome, Lazio	Eliminated 14th	9th
Francesco Rozza	23	Food science student	Ticengo, Lombardy	Eliminated 15th	8th
Antonino Bucolo	36	Butcher	Barcellona Pozzo di Gotto, Sicily	Eliminated 16th	7th
Marianna Calderaro	40	Employee	Monopoli, Apulia	Eliminated 17th	6th
Denise Delli	35	Clinical risk manager	Calci, Tuscany	Eliminated 18th	5th
Davide Aviano	36	Radiographer	Varese, Lombardy	Eliminated 19th	4th
Alberto Menino	23	Mycologist	Tortona, Piedmont	Eliminated 20th	3rd
Kateryna Gryniukh	23	Unemployed	Salerno, Campania	Runner-up	2nd
Simone Scipioni	20	Food science student	Montecosaro, Marche	Winner	1st

== Season Eight ==
The 8th season of MasterChef started airing in December 2018 until April 2019. Antonia Klugmann left MasterChef after only one season, being replaced by chef Giorgio Locatelli. The winner was Valeria Raciti from Sicily. She then published the book Amore curiosità istinto. La mia cucina felice.

=== Contestants ===
Contestant	Age	Occupation	Origin	Status	Place
Paola Chiaraluce	36	Product manager	Dublin, Ireland	Eliminated 1st	20th
Caterina Gualdi	53	Housewife	Cene, Lombardy	Eliminated 2nd	19th
Tiziana Bortolon	53	Craftswoman	Castelfranco Veneto, Veneto	Eliminated 3rd	18th
Tiziana Rispoli	42	Shop assistant	Positano, Campania	Eliminated 4th	17th
Gerry Alotta	37	Blacksmith	Busto Arsizio, Lombardy	Eliminated 5th	16th
Vito Tauro	51	Tire dealer	Castellana Grotte, Apulia	Eliminated 6th	15th
Samuele Cesarini	22	Butcher	San Marino	Eliminated 7th	14th
Anna Martelli	72	Retired	Pecetto Torinese, Piedmont	Eliminated 8th	13th
Giovanni Venditti	37	Medical student	Naples, Campania	Eliminated 9th	12th
Verando Zappi	33	Marketing and communication manager	Viterbo, Lazio	Eliminated 10th	11th
Virginia Fabbri	22	Law student	Urbino, Marche	Eliminated 11th	10th
Salvatore Cozzitorto	31	Cargo ship commander	Agrigento, Sicily	Eliminated 12th	9th
Federico Penzo	20	Fisherman	Chioggia, Veneto	Eliminated 13th	8th
Loretta Rizzotti	51	Architect	Rivanazzano Terme, Lombardy	Eliminated 14th	7th
Giuseppe Lavecchia	35	Peddler	Salice Terme, Lombardy	Eliminated 15th	6th
Guido Fejles	33	Practicing lawyer	Cambiano, Piedmont	Eliminated 16th	5th
Alessandro Bigatti	33	Employee	Lodi, Lombardy	Eliminated 17th	4th
Gloria Clama	40	Worker	Tolmezzo, Friuli-Venezia Giulia	Runner-up	2nd
Gilberto Neirotti	23	Law student	Verona, Veneto	Runner-up	2nd
Valeria Raciti	31	Secretary	Aci Sant'Antonio, Sicily	Winner	1st

== Season Nine ==
The 9th season of MasterChef started airing in December 2019. Joe Bastianich left MasterChef after eight seasons, Bruno Barbieri is now the only judge left from the original cast. Antonio Lorenzon is the winner of this season.

=== Contestants ===
Contestant	Age	Occupation	Origin	Status	Place
Alexandro Picchietti Fabrizi	40	Crane operator	Rome, Lazio	Eliminated 1st	20th
Maria Assunta Cassetta	53	Teacher	Rapolla, Basilicata	Eliminated 2nd	19th
Nunzia Borrelli	44	Beautician	Naples, Campania	Eliminated 3rd	18th
Rossella Costa	48	Entrepreneur	Catanzaro, Calabria	Eliminated 4th	17th
Domenico Letizia	36	Lawyer	Marcianise, Campania	Eliminated 5th	16th
Andrea De Giorgi	23	Shop assistant	Lecce, Apulia	Eliminated 6th	15th
Gianna Meccariello	29	Shop assistant	Benevento, Campania	Eliminated 7th	14th
Fabio Scotto di Vetta	37	Lawyer	Naples, Campania	Eliminated 8th	13th
Annamaria Magi	55	Housewife	Lecce, Apulia	Eliminated 9th	12th
Milenys De Las Mercedes Gordillo Sanchez	49	Shop assistant	Camerino, Marche	Eliminated 10th	11th
Giada Meloni	26	Copywriter	Cornaredo, Lombardy	Eliminated 11th	10th
Vincenzo Trimarco	65	Customs broker	Salerno, Campania	Eliminated 12th	9th
Giulia Busato	31	Employee	Noale, Veneto	Eliminated 13th	8th
Francesca Moi	29	Barlady	Pisa, Tuscany	Eliminated 14th	7th
Luciano Di Marco	52	Surveyor	Palermo, Sicily	Eliminated 15th	6th
Nicolò Duchini	29	Social media manager	Montepulciano, Tuscany	Eliminated 16th	5th
Davide Tonetti	30	Unemployed	Gallarate, Lombardy	Eliminated 17th	4th
Marisa Maffeo	33	Nurse	Parma, Emilia-Romagna	Runner-up	2nd
Maria Teresa Ceglia	31	Financial advisor	Milan, Lombardy	Runner-up	2nd
Antonio Lorenzon	43	Art director	Bassano del Grappa, Veneto	Winner	1st

== Season Ten ==
The 10th season of MasterChef started airing on 17 December 2020. The contestants include American journalist, Maxwell Alexander. The winner was Francesco Aquila.

=== Contestants ===
Contestant	Age	Occupation	Origin	Status	Place
Camilla Lucrezia Lampani	35	Unemployed	Albisola Superiore, Liguria	Eliminated 1st	21st
Francesco Genovese	59	Bank clerk	Palermo, Sicily	Eliminated 2nd	20th
Giuseppe Ricchiuti	36	Plumber	Florence, Tuscany	Eliminated 3rd	19th
Irish Soldani	25	Event planner	Bassano del Grappa, Veneto	Eliminated 4th	18th
Sedighe Sharifi Dahaji	32	Director	Venice, Veneto	Eliminated 5th	17th
Alessandra Nioi	29	Law student	Elmas, Sardinia	Eliminated 6th	16th
Marco Piccolo	31	Unemployed	Rome, Lazio	Eliminated 7th	15th
Daiana Meli	32	Lawyer	Caltanissetta, Sicily	Eliminated 8th	14th
Ilda Muja	43	Self-employed	Novara, Piedmont	Eliminated 9th	13th
Igor Nori	42	Choir director	Montecchio Maggiore, Veneto	Eliminated 10th	12th
Valeria Caserta	24	Head waitress	Vasto, Abruzzo	Eliminated 11th	11th
Cristiano Cavolini	46	Worker	Bologna, Emilia-Romagna	Eliminated 12th	10th
Maxwell Alexander	63	Writer and journalist	Rome, Lazio	Eliminated 13th	9th
Jia Bi Ge	53	Translator	Bari, Apulia	Eliminated 14th	8th
Eduard Lora Alcantara	29	Shop assistant	Verona, Veneto	Eliminated 15th	7th
Federica Di Lieto	30	Chemical engineering student	Montalto Uffugo, Calabria	Eliminated 16th	6th
Azzurra D'Arpa	37	Croupier	Palermo, Sicily	Eliminated 17th	5th
Monir Eddardary	29	Flight attendant	Bevagna, Umbria	Eliminated 18th	4th
Irene Volpe	21	Industrial design student	Rome, Lazio	Runner-up	2nd
Antonio Colasanto	26	PhD student in Food chemistry	Novara, Piedmont	Runner-up	2nd
Francesco Aquila	34	Maître	Bellaria – Igea Marina, Emilia-Romagna	Winner	1st

== Season Eleven ==
The 11th season of MasterChef started airing on 16 December 2021. The winner was Tracy Eboigbodin.

=== Contestants ===
Contestant	Age	Occupation	Origin	Status	Place
Giulia Masetti	30	Model	Bologna, Emilia-Romagna	Eliminated 1st	20th
Andrealetizia Pedrini	25	Unemployed	Brighton, United Kingdom	Eliminated 2nd	19th
Rita Monforte	53	Entrepreneur	Catania, Sicily	Eliminated 3rd	18th
Andrea Comazzi	42	Maître	Marano Ticino, Piedmont	Eliminated 4th	17th
Nicholas Bianchini	21	Radiography student	Arezzo, Tuscany	Eliminated 5th	16th
Anna Leone	30	Nutritionist	Codigoro, Emilia-Romagna	Eliminated 6th	15th
Bruno Tanzi	64	Sales representative	Parma, Emilia-Romagna	Eliminated 7th	14th
Maria Grazia "Mery" Liviero	26	Personal trainer	Rome, Lazio	Eliminated 8th	13th
Tina Caruso	39	Shop assistant	Piacenza, Emilia-Romagna	Eliminated 9th	12th
Pietro Adragna	42	Self-employed	Palermo, Sicily	Eliminated 10th	11th
Dalia Rivolta	30	Commercial advisor	Turin, Piedmont	Eliminated 11th	10th
Gabriele "Polone" Policarpo	34	Bouncer	Anzio, Lazio	Eliminated 12th	9th
Mime Kataniwa	48	Tour guide	Florence, Tuscany	Eliminated 13th	8th
Elena Morlacchi	54	Housewife	Ravenna, Emilia-Romagna	Eliminated 14th	7th
Federico Chimirri	30	DJ	Milan, Lombardy	Eliminated 15th	6th
Nicky Brian Perera	28	Designer	Brighton, United Kingdom	Eliminated 16th	5th
Lia Valetti	30	Bank clerk	Bardolino, Veneto	Eliminated 17th	4th
Christian Passeri	20	Chemical engineering student	Bosconero, Piedmont	Runner-up	2nd
Carmine Gorrasi	18	High school student	Battipaglia, Campania	Runner-up	2nd
Tracy Eboigbodin	28	Waitress	Verona, Veneto	Winner	1st

== Season Twelve ==
The 12th season of MasterChef started airing on 15 December 2022. The winner was Edoardo Franco.

=== Contestants ===
Contestant	Age	Occupation	Origin	Status	Place
Luciana Battistini	74	Retired	Milan, Lombardy	Eliminated 1st	20th
Rachele Rossi	34	Sales manager	Milan, Lombardy	Eliminated 2nd	19th
Francesco Girardi	33	Photographer	Cesena, Emilia-Romagna	Eliminated 3rd	18th
Letizia Borri	25	Health Care Assistant	Carpi, Emilia-Romagna	Eliminated 4th	17th
Francesca Filippone	39	Export manager	Rancio Valcuvia, Lombardy	Eliminated 5th	16th
Ivana Santomo	60	Parliamentary secretary	Rome, Lazio	Eliminated 6th	15th
Giuseppe Carlone	43	Medical laboratory manager	Bari, Apulia	Eliminated 7th	14th
Silvia Zummo	56	Hotelier	Rome, Lazio	Eliminated 8th	13th
Nicola Longanesi	20	Gastronomic sciences student	Bagnacavallo, Emilia-Romagna	Eliminated 9th	12th
Ollivier Stemberger	45	Luxury goods manager	Parma, Emilia-Romagna	Eliminated 10th	11th
Laura Manili	31	Architect	Rome, Lazio	Eliminated 11th	10th
Leonardo Colavito	20	Economy student	Trento, Trentino-Alto Adige	Eliminated 12th	9th
Francesco Saragò	29	Waiter	Rome, Lazio	Eliminated 13th	8th
Lavinia Scotto	22	Economy student	Chieri, Piedmont	Eliminated 14th	7th
Roberto Resta	34	Mechanical designer	Fombio, Lombardy	Eliminated 15th	6th
Sara Messaoudi	27	Employee	Bergamo, Lombardy	Eliminated 16th	5th
Mattia Tagetto	37	Wine shop manager	Bolzano, Trentino-Alto Adige	Eliminated 17th	4th
Antonio "Bubu" Gargiulo	19	Archeology student	Sestu, Sardinia	Runner-up	2nd
Hue Dinh Thi	27	Project assistant	Florence, Tuscany	Runner-up	2nd
Edoardo Franco	26	Unemployed	Varese, Lombardy	Winner	1st

== Season Thirteen ==
The 13th season of MasterChef started airing on 14 December 2023. The winner was Eleonora Riso.

=== Contestants ===
Contestant	Age	Occupation	Origin	Status	Place
Henintsoa "Chù" Razanadrabe	22	Economy student	Parma, Emilia-Romagna	Eliminated 1st	20th
Fiorenza Pennacchio	31	Radiology technician	Giugliano in Campania, Campania	Eliminated 2nd	19th
Valeria Zullo	52	Windsurfer	Rome, Lazio	Eliminated 3rd	18th
Nicolò Molinari	19	Law student	Rome, Lazio	Eliminated 4th	17th
Beatrice Belli	19	Basketball player	Rome, Lazio	Eliminated 5th	16th
Anna Pisano	62	Pharmacist	San Marco Argentano, Calabria	Eliminated 6th	15th
Andrea Sciamanna	34	Sommelier	Senigallia, Marche	Eliminated 7th	14th
Alberto Pierobon	33	Manager of a fish shop	San Martino di Lupari, Veneto	Eliminated 8th	13th
Alice Scaffardi	27	Unemployed	Rome, Lazio	Eliminated 9th	12th
Lorenzo Silvidio	21	Network marketer	Torrevecchia Teatina, Abruzzo	Eliminated 10th	11th
Filippo Baldo	25	Architect	Cittadella, Veneto	Eliminated 11th	10th
Marcus Agerstroem	43	Stay-at-home dad	Cherasco, Piedmont	Eliminated 12th	9th
Settimino Difonzo	61	Grocer	Santeramo in Colle, Apulia	Eliminated 13th	8th
Deborah Meloni	30	Team leader	Poggio Mirteto, Lazio	Eliminated 14th	7th
Kassandra Galindo Rodriguez	25	Barlady	Giovo, Trentino-Alto Adige	Eliminated 15th	6th
Niccolò Califano	26	Medical doctor	Ravenna, Emilia-Romagna	Eliminated 16th	5th
Sara Bellinzona	24	Employee	Montalto Pavese, Lombardy	Eliminated 17th	4th
Antonio Mazzola	28	Surveyor	Höhenkirchen-Siegertsbrunn, Germany	Runner-up	2nd
Michela Morelli	45	Personal trainer	Appiano sulla Strada del Vino, Trentino-Alto Adige	Runner-up	2nd
Eleonora Riso	27	Waitress	Florence, Tuscany	Winner	1st

== Season Fourteen ==
The 14th season of MasterChef started airing on 12 December 2024. The winner was Yi Lan "Anna" Zhang.

=== Contestants ===
Contestant	Age	Occupation	Origin	Status	Place
Simone Bazzali	29	Farmer	Sospirolo, Veneto	Eliminated 1st	20th
Giulio Valtriani	35	Lifeguard	Cascina, Tuscany	Eliminated 2nd	19th
Ilaria di Lelio	26	Children's Entertainer	Rome, Lazio	Eliminated 3rd	18th
Gaetano Di Trapani	19	Student	Palermo, Sicily	Eliminated 4th	17th
Laura Tampellini	29	Unemployed	Gambara, Lombardy	Eliminated 5th	16th
Martina Buriani	25	Head Waitress	Pietrasanta, Tuscany	Eliminated 6th	15th
Reza Djebbelly	56	Sales Manager	Rome, Lazio	Eliminated 7th	14th
Linda Mirabella	49	Bartender	Turin, Piedmont	Eliminated 8th	13th
Giuseppe Pino Iacobbe	61	Carpenter	Miglianico, Abruzzo	Eliminated 9th	12th
Sara Ferretti	27	Model	Naples, Campania	Eliminated 10th	11th
Samuele Uva	19	Unemployed	Desenzano Del Garda, Lombardy	Eliminated 11th	10h
Alessia Scita	21	Waitress	Parma, Emilia-Romagna	Eliminated 12th	9th
Gianni Marino	30	Clerk	Palermo, Sicily	Eliminated 13th	8th
Claudio Ciraci	33	Inspection Centre Owner	San Michele Salentino, Apulia	Eliminated 14th	7th
Katia Bassolino	43	Clerk	Mariglianella, Campania	Eliminated 15th	6th
Franco Della Bella	43	Marketing Director	Verona, Veneto	Eliminated 16th	5th
Mary Cuzzupè	30	Human Resources Manager	Villongo, Lombardy	Eliminated 17th	4th
Jacopo "Jack" Canevali	26	Content Creator	Cesano Boscone, Lombardy	Runner-up	2nd
Simone Grazioso	35	Entrepreneur	La Morra, Piedmont	Runner-up	2nd
Yi Lan "Anna" Zhang	32	Fashion Consultant	Milan, Lombardy	Winner	1st

== Season Fifteen ==
The 15th season of MasterChef started airing on 11 December 2025.

=== Contestants ===
Contestant	Age	Occupation	Origin	Status	Place
Katia Mauro	32	Poke store manager	Genoa, Liguria	Eliminated 1st	20th
Giuliana Capursi	36	Gastronomic Sciences student	Manfredonia, Apulia	Eliminated 2nd	19th
Eros Monforte	27	Barman	Mascalucia, Sicily	Eliminated 3rd	18th
Andrea "Piponzio" Sonnati	26	Color system operator	Foiano della Chiana, Tuscany	Eliminated 4th	17th
Gaetano Pullara	52	Architect	San Michele di Ganzaria, Sicily	Eliminated 5th	16th
Antonio Senise	24	Law student	Lungro, Calabria	Eliminated 6th	15th
Georgina Martinelli	26	Fair hostess	Mogliano Veneto, Veneto	Eliminated 7th	14th
Vittoria Lombardo	36	Business owner	Reggio Emilia, Emilia-Romagna	Eliminated 8th	13th
Franco Agyekum	31	Technical consultant	Santa Lucia di Piave, Veneto	Eliminated 9th	12th
Iolanda Marinho	56	Former teacher	Rende, Calabria	Eliminated 10th	11th
Irene Rescifina	20	Law student	Messina, Sicily	Eliminated 11th	10th
Jonny Pescaglini	25	Worker	Borgo a Mozzano, Tuscany	Eliminated 12th	9th
Dorella Del Giudice	57	Clerk	Statte, Apulia	Eliminated 13th	8th
Matteo Lee	27	Retail Investor	Bologna, Emilia-Romagna	Eliminated 14th	7th
Alessandro Segantin	44	Dentist	Genoa, Liguria	Eliminated 15th	6th
Niccolò Mazzanti	35	Controller	Massa, Tuscany	Eliminated 16th	5th
Dounia Zirari	28	Health worker	Bassano del Grappa, Veneto	Eliminated 17th	4th
Matteo Rinaldi	28	Graphic designer	Boltiere, Lombardy	Eliminated 18th	3th
Carlotta Bertin	25	Unemployed	Candelo, Piedmont	Runner-up	2nd
Matteo Canzi	23	International Marketing student	Olgiate Molgora, Lombardy	Winner	1st

== Spin-off editions ==
=== Junior MasterChef Italia ===
On 16 April 2013, it was announced the MasterChef inspired spin-off, MasterChef Italy Junior, would involve children between 8 and 13 years of age. The casting began on 17 April 2013. The judges are Bruno Barbieri, Lidia Bastianich and Alessandro Borghese in the first two seasons, while Gennaro Esposito replaced Lidia Bastianich in the third. The first season aired from 13 March to 10 April 2014. After three seasons, the spin-off was put on hiatus.

=== Celebrity MasterChef Italia ===
In 2017, the first season of Celebrity MasterChef Italia ended with the victory of Roberta Capua, an Italian TV host.

==== Contestants ====
Contestant	Age	Occupation	Origin	Status	Place
Serra Yılmaz	62	Actress	Istanbul, Turkey	Eliminated 1st	12th
Stefano Meloccaro	52	Sports journalist	Rieti, Lazio	Eliminated 2nd	11th
Enrica Guidi	32	Actress	Livorno, Tuscany	Eliminated 3rd	10th
Maria Grazia Cucinotta	48	Actress	Messina, Sicily	Eliminated 4th	9th
Antonio Capitani	58	Astrologist	Porto Santo Stefano, Tuscany	Eliminated 5th	8th
Mara Maionchi	75	Record producer	Bologna, Emilia-Romagna	Eliminated 6th	7th
Alex Britti	48	Singer-songwriter	Rome, Lazio	Eliminated 7th	6th
Elena Di Cioccio	42	Actress and TV host	Milan, Lombardy	Eliminated 8th	5th
Filippo Magnini	35	Swimmer	Pesaro, Marche	Eliminated 9th	4th
Marisa Passera	44	TV and radio host	Milan, Lombardy	Eliminated 9th	3rd
Nesli	36	Singer-songwriter	Senigallia, Marche	Runner-up	2nd
Roberta Capua	48	TV host	Naples, Campania	Winner	1st

=== Celebrity MasterChef Italia 2 ===
In 2018, the second season of Celebrity MasterChef Italia ended with the victory of Anna Tatangelo, an Italian singer.

==== Contestants ====
Contestant	Age	Occupation	Origin	Status	Place
Laura Barriales	35	Actress and model	León, Spain	Eliminated 1st	12th
Umberto Guidoni	63	Astronaut and astrophysicist	Rome, Lazio	Eliminated 2nd	11th
Barbara Alberti	74	Journalist and writer	Umbertide, Umbria	Eliminated 3rd	10th
Valerio Spinella	35	Sports journalist	Rome, Lazio	Eliminated 4th	9th
Serena Autieri	41	Actress	Naples, Campania	Eliminated 5th	8th
Lorenzo Amoruso	46	Former footballer	Bari, Apulia	Eliminated 6th	7th
Andrea Lo Cicero	41	Rugby player	Catania, Sicily	Eliminated 7th	6th
Margherita Granbassi	38	Former fencer and TV host	Trieste, Friuli-Venezia Giulia	Eliminated 8th	5th
Daniele Tombolini	56	Former referee	Loreto, Marche	Eliminated 9th	4th
Davide Devenuto	46	Actor	Rome, Lazio	Eliminated 9th	3rd
Orietta Berti	71	Singer	Cavriago, Emilia-Romagna	Runner-up	2nd
Anna Tatangelo	31	Singer	Sora, Lazio	Winner	1st

=== Masterchef All Stars Italia ===
On 1 June 2018, the Italian version of MasterChef All Stars is announced, the spin-off of MasterChef where 16 of the most talented former competitors of the seven editions held so far will participate. On 21 June, the 16 contestants who will form the cast were announced. The judges are Bruno Barbieri and Antonino Cannavacciuolo, supported each evening by a guest judge chosen in rotation among Joe Bastianich, Antonia Klugmann, Iginio Massari and Giorgio Locatelli. It was broadcast on Sky Uno from 20 December 2018 to 10 January 2019. The winner was Michele Cannistraro.

==== Contestants ====
Contestant	Age	Previous Season	Previous Season Placing	Status	Place
Marika Elefante	34	MC2	5th	Eliminated 1st	Top 16
Dario Baruffa	32	MC5	6th	Eliminated 2nd	Top 16
Loredana Martori	40	MC6	5th	Eliminated 3rd	Top 16
Anna Lupi	56	MC1	10th	Eliminated 4th	Top 16
Daiana Cecconi	59	MC2	6th	Eliminated 5th	Top 16
Paola Galloni	45	MC2	7th	Eliminated 6th	11th
Almo Bibolotti	44	MC3	2nd	Eliminated 7th	10th
Alberto Menino	24	MC7	3rd	Eliminated 8th	9th
Maurizio Rosazza Prin	40	MC2	2nd	Eliminated 9th	8th
Alida Gotta	28	MC5	2nd	Eliminated 10th	7th
Ivan Iurato	42	MC2	4th	Eliminated 11th	6th
Maradona Youssef	31	MC5	4th	Eliminated 12th	5th
Giuseppe Danny D'Annibale	38	MC1	5th	Eliminated 13th	4th
Simone Finetti	29	MC4	8th	Runner-up	2nd
Rubina Rovini	37	MC5	7th	Runner-up	2nd
Michele Cannistraro	41	MC3	8th	Winner	1st
