= Zafferano =

Restaurant in London, England

Coordinates: 51°29′56.25″N 0°9′27.75″W

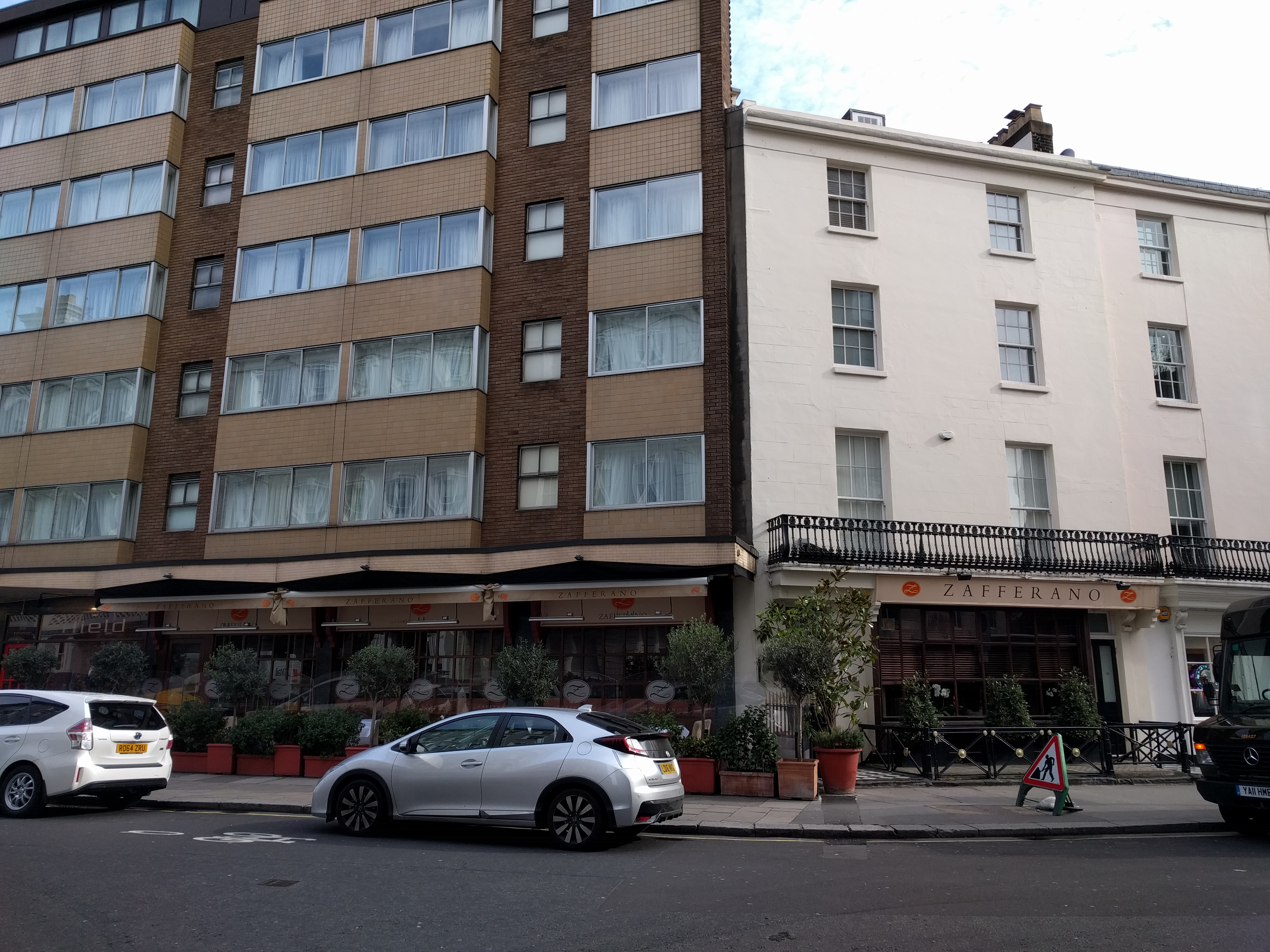

Restaurant information
- Established: February 1995; 30 years ago
- Owner: John Francis De Stefano
- Head chef: Frederico Del Busso (2023– Current)
- Food type: Italian cuisine
- Location: 15 17 Lowndes Street, London, SW1X 9EY, United Kingdom
- Reservations: Yes
- Other information: General Manager: Giuseppe Bellino; Nearest station: Knightsbridge
- Website: www.zafferanorestaurant.com

Zafferano is a restaurant in London, originally run by Giorgio Locatelli on behalf of A–Z Restaurants until 2005. The restaurant was awarded one Michelin star in 1999, which it held until 2012.

== History ==
Zafferano was opened by Locatelli in February 1995 in Knightsbridge, London. Its name comes from the Italian for saffron. The location had previously been a fish restaurant, but under Locatelli the new restaurant served Italian food. The major investor in the restaurant was Claudio Pulze, who owned the restaurant through his company A–Z Restaurants. Locatelli's pay was based on a percentage of the overall performance of the restaurant.

The restaurant was awarded a Michelin star in the list published in 1999. Locatelli was named the Outstanding London Chef of 2001 at the London Restaurant Awards, but shortly afterwards left the restaurant following disagreements with new head of A–Z Restaurants, Giuliano Lotto. Andrew Needham took over as head chef, having previously been Locatelli's sous chef.

After A–Z Restaurants went into administration in November 2004, Locatelli said that he was interested in purchasing Zafferano. The group, including Zafferano, was sold back to Claudio Pulze with a new partner, John De Stefano. In 2007, Pulze sold his share of the company to De Stefano. The restaurant expanded during the same year and opened a delicatessen.

== Menu ==
The restaurant's menu is influenced by the previous restaurants at which Locatelli worked, including The Savoy Hotel and at Olivo, where the menu was centred on Italian peasant foods. It was initially launched with a series of set price menus, with the idea that the menus would be changed on a monthly basis, and the dishes avoid using butter as an ingredient. Only one dish in the original 1995 menu was served with butter — a dish of pappardelle pasta with chicken livers and sage.

Desserts have included strawberries drizzled with 60-year-old balsamic vinegar. The signature dessert is a tiramisu served inside a tuile. Although saffron fibres are woven into the covers of the bill cover, the process was too expensive to repeat for the covers of the menus. Between 1997 and 2005, the average cost of a meal at the restaurant increased by 65%, from £34 to £56.

== Reception ==
Matthew Norman, writing for The Daily Telegraph in 2003, described it as "one of the best restaurants around", although he did criticise the attitude of its staff. In 2013, Time Out wrote that Zafferano "has some way to go to rediscover its glory days". It was awarded three AA Rosettes in 2009. In 2011, the restaurant was named 55th in the list of the top restaurants in the UK by The Good Food Guide.
