= Villa Crespi =

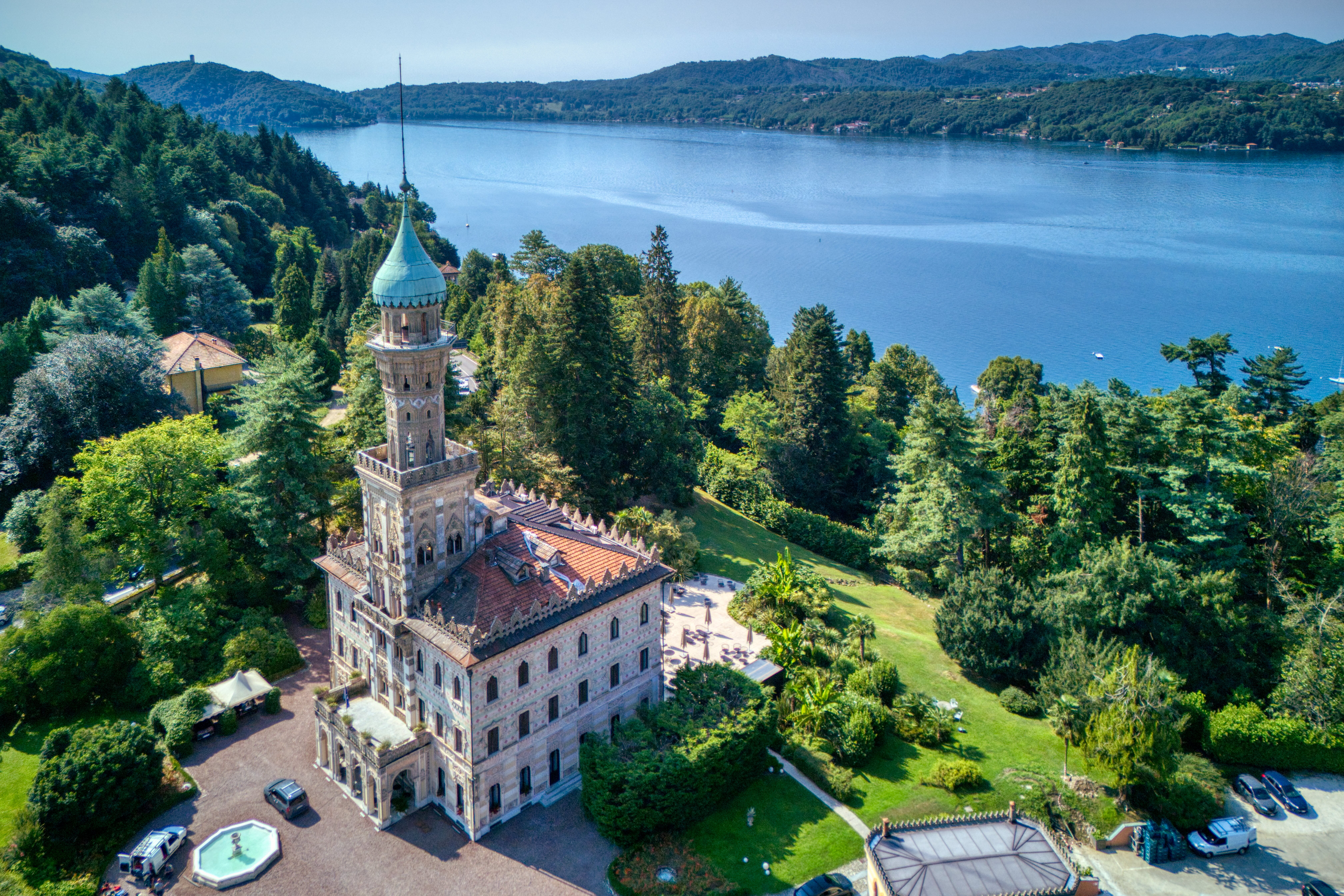
- Villa Crespi in Orta San Giulio
- Click on the map for a fullscreen view
- Former names: Villa Pia

General information
- Architectural style: Moorish Revival, eclectic
- Location: Orta San Giulio, Piedmont, Italy
- Coordinates: 45.7964°N 8.4161°E
- Current tenants: Antonino Cannavacciuolo
- Construction started: 1879; 147 years ago
- Client: Cristoforo Crespi

Design and construction
- Architect: Angelo Colla
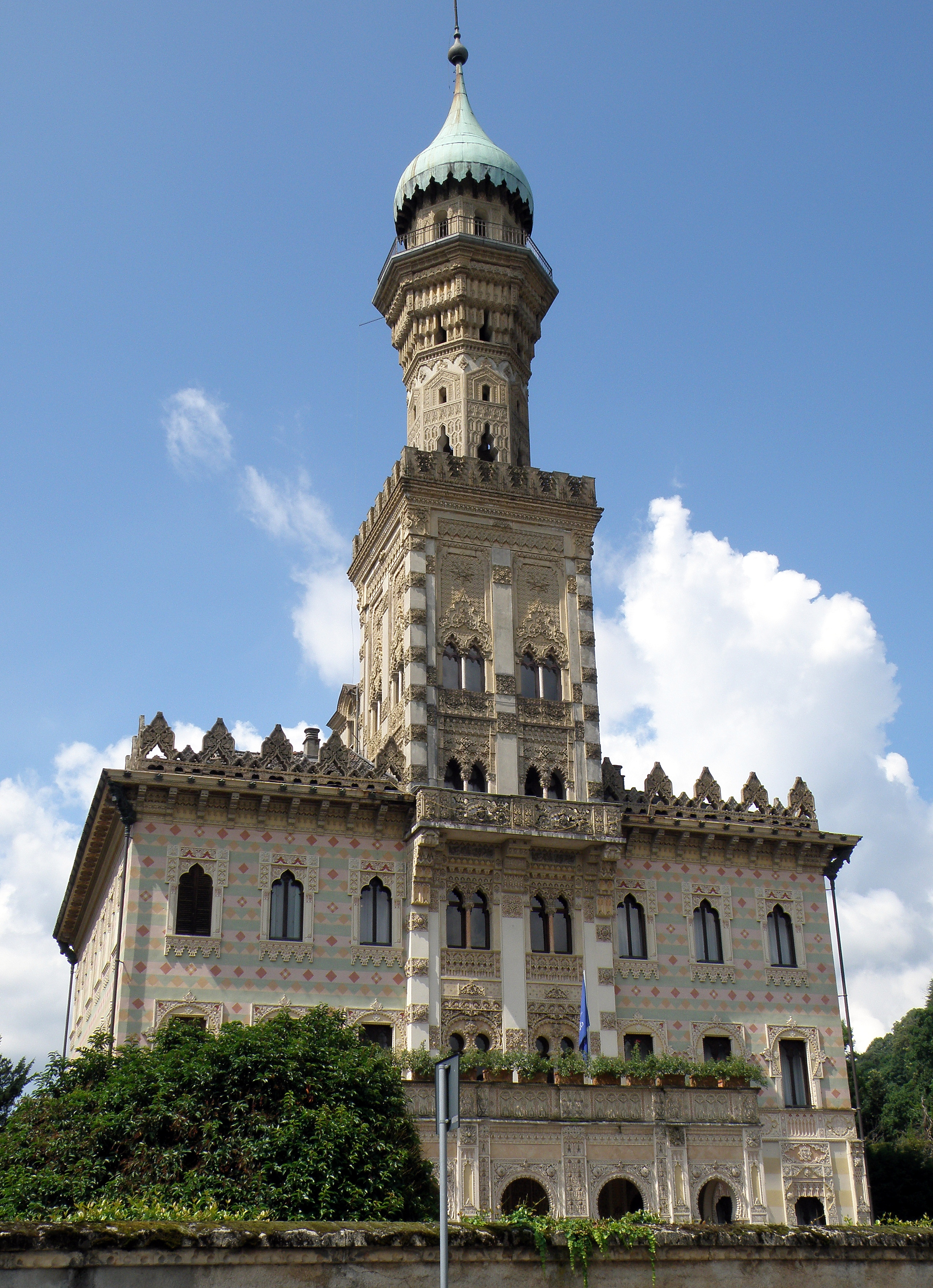
- Front view of the building

Restaurant information
- Established: 1999; 27 years ago
- Owner: Relais & Châteaux
- Manager: Massimo Raugi
- Head chef: Antonino Cannavacciuolo
- Chef: Simone Corbo
- Food type: Italian
- Rating: Tripadvisor Travellers' Choice Best of the Best (5th, 2023)
- Website: villacrespi.it

Villa Crespi is a 19th-century Moorish Revival-style rural mansion in the town of Orta San Giulio, Province of Novara, Piedmont, Italy; it is located southeast of the town, on Via G. Fava 18, near the shores of Lake Orta and below the Sacro Monte di Orta. The Villa is now a luxury hotel and restaurant managed by chef and restaurateur Antonino Cannavacciuolo, which has been awarded with three Michelin stars.

The Villa, notable for its scenic minaret-like tower and interior atrium decorated in stucco arabesque, owes its name to the wealthy cotton merchant Cristoforo Benigno Crespi, who commissioned its construction to architect Angelo Colla in 1879 as his family holiday home and wanted it to remind him of the buildings he had seen during his working trips to the Middle East. It was once also called Villa Pia after Crespi's wife.

In 1914, it was the location for the film Iwna, the Ganges' Pearl (original title Iwna, la perla del Gange) by Giuseppe Pinto.

== See also ==
- List of Michelin-starred restaurants in Italy
