= Max Alexander (journalist) =

American journalist and editor (born 1957)

Maxwell West Alexander (born February 17, 1957) is an American journalist and editor. He was a senior editor at People Weekly. Before his job at People, Alexander served as executive editor of Variety and Daily Variety, where he edited The 1936 History of Show Business (Abrams).

Alexander was born in Grand Rapids, Michigan in 1957, and earned a baccalaureate of arts in art history from Columbia University in 1987.

A resident of Rome, Italy since 2019, Alexander writes for Smithsonian, Reader's Digest, and many other national magazines. He co-wrote Call Me American (Knopf), The Arrows Cookbook (Scribner) and Two for the Money (Carroll & Graf) and edited George Plimpton's last book, Ernest Shackleton.

Alexander's first memoir, Man Bites Log: The Unlikely Adventures of a City Guy in the Woods, was published in 2004. A chronicle of his brother's adventure building a business in Ghana, West Africa, Bright Lights, No City, was published by Hyperion Books in July 2012.

In 2020, he competed in the tenth season of MasterChef Italia.

Alexander has two sons, Harper and Will. His son Harper is married to native Italian Eva Santaguida and together they run a YouTube channel called Pasta Grammar where they post videos about Italian food, culture, and cooking. They also have a website with the same name.
