= Basiliek =

Coordinates: 52°21′4.55″N 5°37′16.45″E

- Interactive map of Basiliek

Restaurant information
- Established: 2006
- Head chef: Rik Jansma
- Food type: French, Regional, Biologic
- Rating: Michelin Guide
- Location: Vischmarkt 57-L, Harderwijk, 3841 BE, Netherlands
- Seating capacity: 45
- Website: Official website

Basiliek is a restaurant in Harderwijk in the Netherlands. It is a fine dining restaurant that is awarded one Michelin star in the period 2007–present.

GaultMillau awarded the restaurant 16 out of 20 points.

Head chef of Basiliek is Rik Jansma.

Basiliek was founded in 2006, after Rik Jansma and Andrea van Zoomeren bought the closed down Michelin starred restaurant Olivio. Jansma had worked as sous chef in Olivio, prior to the closure.

== See also ==
- List of Michelin starred restaurants in the Netherlands
