= Provola =

Italian semi-hard cheese

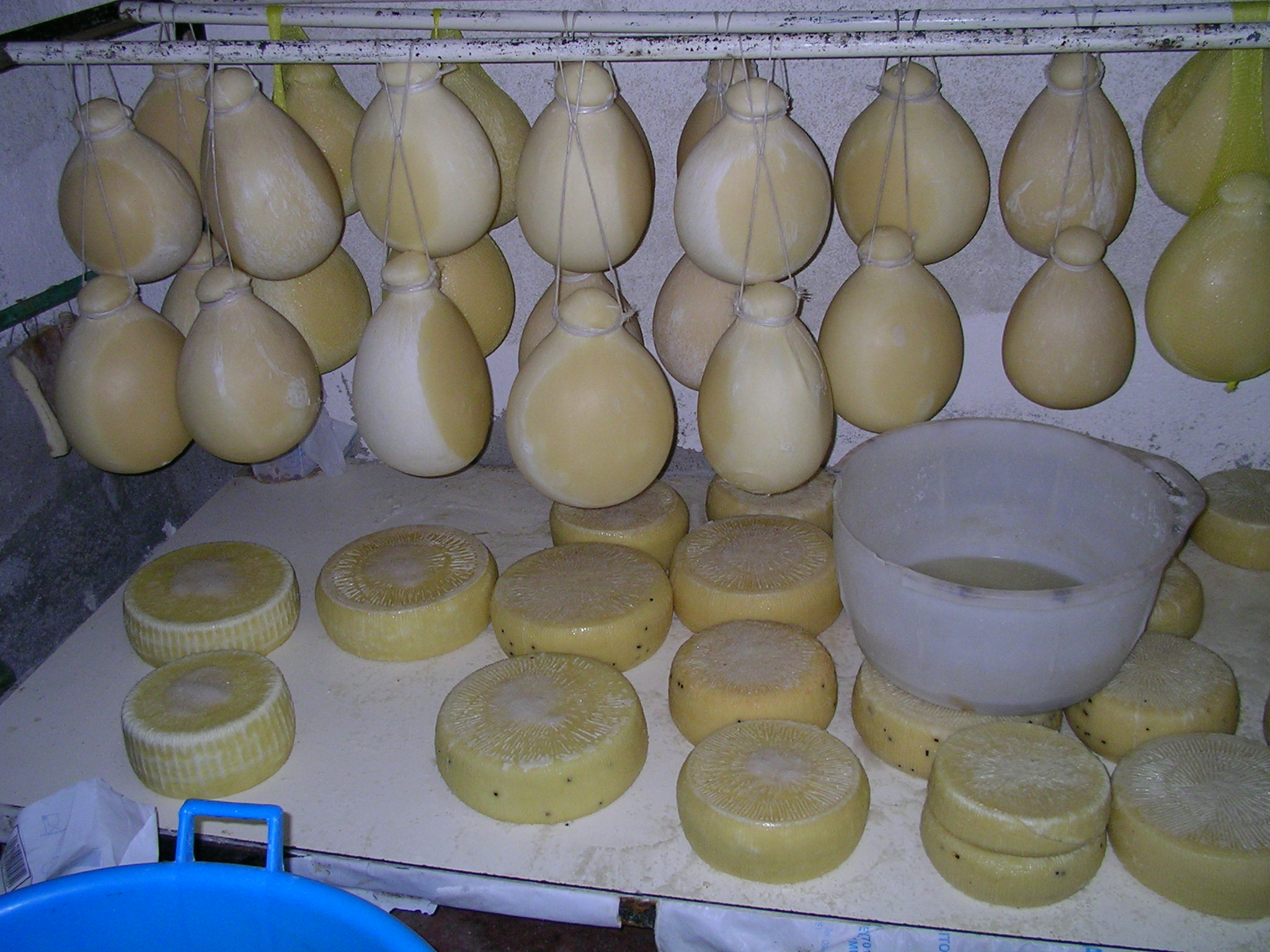
- Other names: Provola dei Nebrodi
- Country of origin: Italy
- Region: Apulia; Basilicata; Calabria; Campania; Lazio; Sardinia; Sicily
- Source of milk: Cows
- Pasteurized: Depends on cow variety
- Texture: Semi-hard
- Certification: PAT

Provola is an Italian semi-hard stretched curd cheese made from raw cow's milk and produced with a cooked or semi-cooked stretched curd.

Although its origins lie in the Italian region of Campania, its production is now widespread across all regions of southern Italy, with different variants that depend on the cattle breed, the aging process, and specific local factors such as microclimates and cheesemaking traditions.

Despite the shared origin of the name and the production technique, provola differs from provolone (lit. "large provola", a variety better known in the United States) in its size, production methods, and its much more delicate flavor. Unlike provolone, which originated in northern Italy, provola is a traditional cheese of southern Italy.

== History and varieties ==
Provola is believed to have originated in the Campania region of southern Italy. Its name is traditionally linked to the dialect term provatura, associated with the practice of testing a piece of curd (prova) in hot water to verify its readiness for stretching. The origins of the cheese likely date back to the 17th century, although references to similar stretched-curd cheeses in Campania appear as early as the Middle Ages, indicating a much older local tradition.

While provola shares the pasta-filata (stretched-curd) production method with cheeses such as mozzarella, it differs in that the curd is typically stretched for a longer period, resulting in a firmer texture. Some varieties may also be briefly aged or smoked, setting them apart from fresh, unsmoked versions. In certain regions, provola is made from buffalo milk, contributing to additional local variations.

Notable regional varieties include:

- Smoked Campanian Provola: produced in various areas of Campania, this version is lightly smoked over damp straw to add aroma and colour.
- Provola dei Nebrodi in Sicily: which can reach weights of 4-5 kg and is produced in versions such as plain, smoked or even with a whole lemon inserted during production.
- Provola delle Madonie, also Sicilian: distinguished by a shorter maturation period (10-15 days) and a mild, sweet flavour.
- Provola Silana of Calabria: crafted in the mountainous Sila region, featuring a distinct shape and texture that reflect its high-altitude origin.

== See also ==
- List of Italian cheeses

== Sources ==
- Tunick, Michael (2014). The Science of Cheese. OUP USA. ISBN 978-0-19-992230-7.
