= Timothy J. Jansma =

Tim Jansma (13 September 1952 - 25 October 2016) was a notable contemporary luthier, a maker of violins, violas and cellos. He was apprenticed at William Moennig and Son in Philadelphia and graduated from the International School of Violin Making of Cremona in Italy. The original Jansma Violin Shop was in Cremona and was permanently established in Fremont, Michigan, USA, in 1977. Jansma instruments are sold around the world to professional musicians and students.

== Biography ==
Jansma began his training in his father's woodworking shop at the age of 8. He studied violin performance into his college years; his teachers included Walter Verdehr of Michigan State University and Frank Costanza of the Philadelphia Orchestra. He was apprenticed at the violin shop of William Moennig and Son in Philadelphia, one of the oldest and most distinguished dealers and appraisers of rare violins, violas, cellos and their bows in the world, founded in 1909. During this period, he completed his training in string instrument restoration while simultaneously studying and playing upon some of the most notable violins in history. The Moennig shop had acquired much of the Rembert Wurlitzer Co. collection, a fine collection of historically important string instruments. He was often summoned from his workbench in order to play instruments made by notable makers including Antonio Stradivarius, Giuseppe Guarneri, Joannes Baptista Guadagnini, Domenico Montagnana, Francesco Ruggeri and Jean-Baptiste Vuillaume.

After Jansma completed his training at Moennig and Son, he enrolled into the International School of Violin Making of Cremona, where he learned Italian violin-making techniques and earned his diploma. As a specialist in tonewoods, he sold Yugoslavian maple and Italian spruce to the Cremonese makers while in Europe and later to American makers.

As a musician, he performed with the Grand Rapids Symphony, Lansing Symphony Orchestra and West Shore Symphony (now West Michigan Symphony Orchestra). Jansma instruments are made in the Cremonese tradition, implementing age-old techniques from Jansma's early training and from decades of experience in making and restoration. His instruments are favored by symphony musicians for their sound and ease of response, and by soloists for their penetrating resonance.

== Personal life ==
Jansma was married and had two children, both fine musicians themselves.

== Music advocacy ==
Tim Jansma was a board member for Blue Lake Fine Arts Camp. He was the string instrument specialist for Interlochen Arts Academy and appeared as guest speaker at universities, music conservatories and civic organizations.

== See also ==
- AFVBM biography
- Biography at Violinist
