= Antonino Cannavacciuolo =

Italian chef (born 1975)

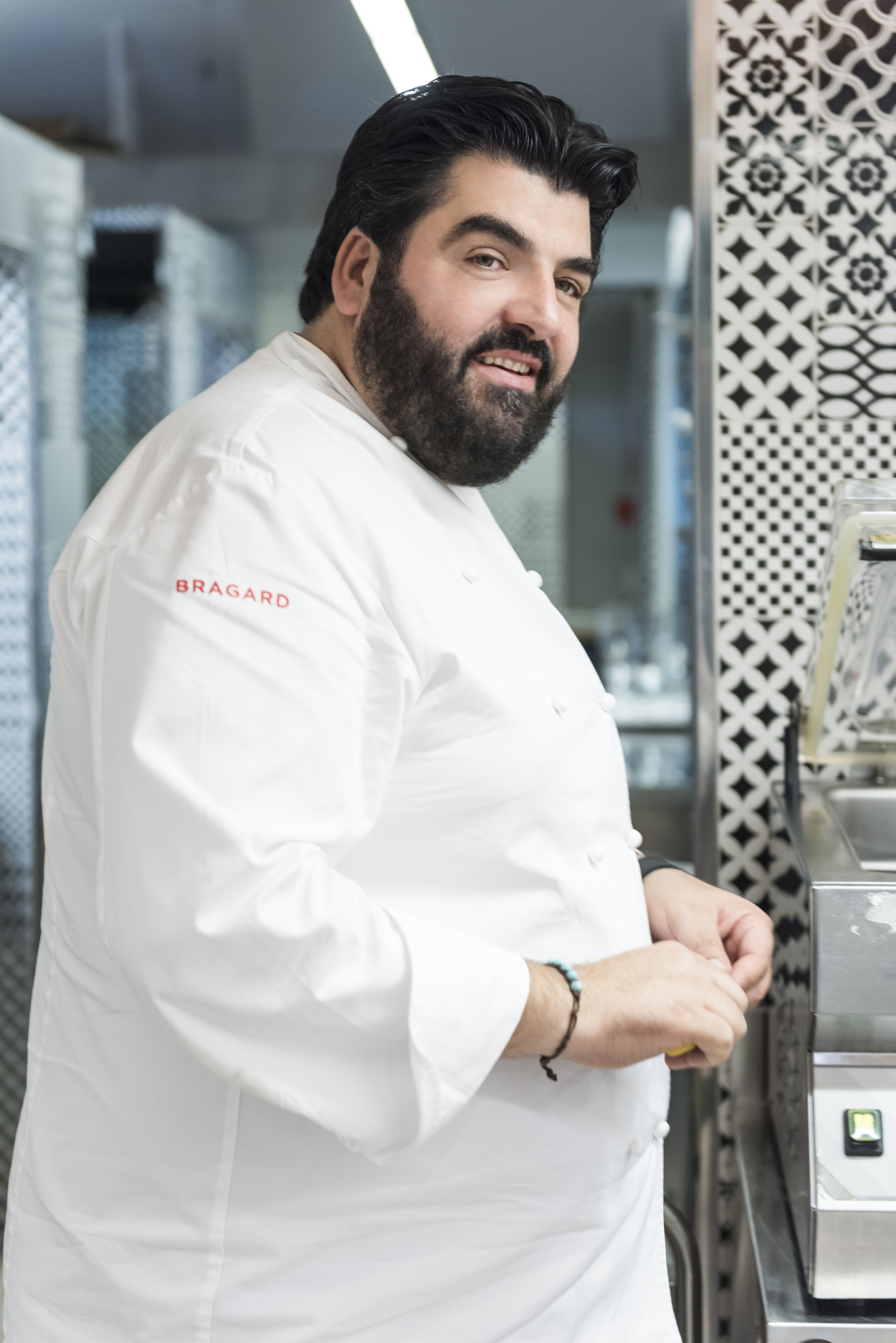
- Cannavacciuolo in 2017
- Born: 16 April 1975 (age 50); Vico Equense, Italy
- Culinary career
- Cooking style: Italian
- Current restaurants: Villa Crespi, Orta San Giulio; Cannavacciuolo Bistrot, Turin; Laqua Countryside, Vico Equense; Laqua Vineyard, Terricciola; Laqua by the Lake, Pettenasco; Le Cattedrali Relais, Asti
- Website: www.antoninocannavacciuolo.it

Antonino Cannavacciuolo (Italian pronunciation: [antoˈniːno kannavatˈtʃwɔːlo]; born 16 April 1975) is an Italian chef, restaurateur and television personality. He has collected 9 Michelin stars.

== Biography ==
Born in Vico Equense, he studied at the local hotel school, I.S.I.S. “F. De Gennaro” (where his father Andrea, also a cook, taught), earning a Certificate of Cuisine in 1993. After his first experiences in the Sorrento peninsula, he followed internship periods at two French restaurants in the Alsace region, the Auberge de l'Ill in Illhaeusern and the Buerehiesel in Strasbourg. He also had the opportunity to work in the restaurant of the Grand Hotel Quisisana in Capri, when the kitchen was under the consultancy of Gualtiero Marchesi. There was some controversy about this experience from Marchesi, who pointed out that at that time his presence was limited to the role of consultant and not chef de cuisine and that he had no direct collaboration with Cannavacciuolo.

In 1999 he took over, along with his wife, the management of the historic Moorish-style mansion Villa Crespi in Orta San Giulio on Lake Orta, serving as chef patron. In 2003 he received his first Michelin star, and in 2006 he was awarded his second. Since 2012 Villa Crespi, equipped with a hotel and restaurant, has entered the Relais & Châteaux circuit. In 2022 the restaurant received its third Michelin star, becoming one among 140 restaurants boasting this recognition.

His television debut came in 2013, when he hosted the first season of Cucine da incubo, the Italian version of British chef Gordon Ramsay U.S.-based program of the same name; in the years that followed, he retained the lead on the other editions. After being a guest on two episodes of the fourth season of MasterChef Italia, it was announced that he would be a judge starting from the fifth season (2015-2016), joining his colleagues Bruno Barbieri, Joe Bastianich and Carlo Cracco and continuing to be a judge in all the following editions as well; to date he is the second judge in terms of the number of editions he has taken part in, behind Bruno Barbieri, the only judge present continuously since the program's inception.

In late October 2015, he opened a venue in downtown Novara, Cannavacciuolo Café & Bistrot, open from breakfast to after dinner. In November 2015, he promoted a first training event on entrepreneurial techniques in the restaurant industry, organized by the Cannavacciuolo Academy, at the Sheraton Hotel in Milan Malpensa Airport, and in April 2016 a second one was held at the Stadio Olimpico.

He has been invited to numerous TV and radio programs as a guest, including the 2016 Sanremo Festival. Also in 2016 he created with other chefs for Amref Health Africa the “Christmas Menu,” with the participation of Giobbe Covatta. In 2017 he hosted the first season of a new program he created, 'O mare mio, consisting of four episodes, each in a different seaside town. This was followed in 2018 by two more series of four and five episodes, respectively.

In July 2017, he opened a new venue in Turin, Bistrot Cannavacciuolo, located in the Borgo Po neighborhood. On Nov. 16, 2017, Ci pensa Antonino aired on Channel Nove (TV channel), a special on the occasion of the opening of the new bistro, in which the chef talked about his idea of catering, from his first experiences behind the stove to his love affair with his wife and business partner. In 2018, he was confirmed as one of the judges on Celebrity MasterChef along with Bruno Barbieri and Joe Bastianich.

== Restaurants ==
- Villa Crespi, Orta San Giulio
- Cannavacciuolo Café & Bistrot, Novara (Now permanently closed)
- Cannavacciuolo Bistrot, Turin
- Laqua Countryside, Vico Equense
- Laqua Vineyard, Terricciola
- Laqua by the Lake, Pettenasco
- Le Cattedrali Relais, Asti

== Television ==
- Cucine da incubo (2013–2015; 2016–present)
- MasterChef Italia (2015–present)
- 'O mare mio (2017–present)
- Ci pensa Antonino (2017)
- Celebrity MasterChef Italia (2017–2018)
- MasterChef All Stars Italia (2018–2019)
- I menù di Cannavacciuolo (2019)
- Antonino Chef Academy (2019–present)
- Family Food Fight (2019)

== Books ==
Media related to Antonino Cannavacciuolo at Wikimedia Commons

- In cucina comando io (2013)
- Pure tu vuoi fare lo chef? (2014)
- Il piatto forte è l'emozione. 50 ricette dal Sud al Nord (2016)
- Mettici il cuore. 50 ricette per la cucina di tutti i giorni (2017)
- A tavola si sta insieme. I menu d'autore per le tue serate in compagnia (2018)
- Tutto il sapore che vuoi. 50 ricette di cucina vegetariana (2019)
- Il pranzo di Natale. I piatti delle feste e la cucina degli avanzi (2019)
- Il meglio di Antonino (2020)
