= Giorgio Locatelli =

Italian chef (born 1963)

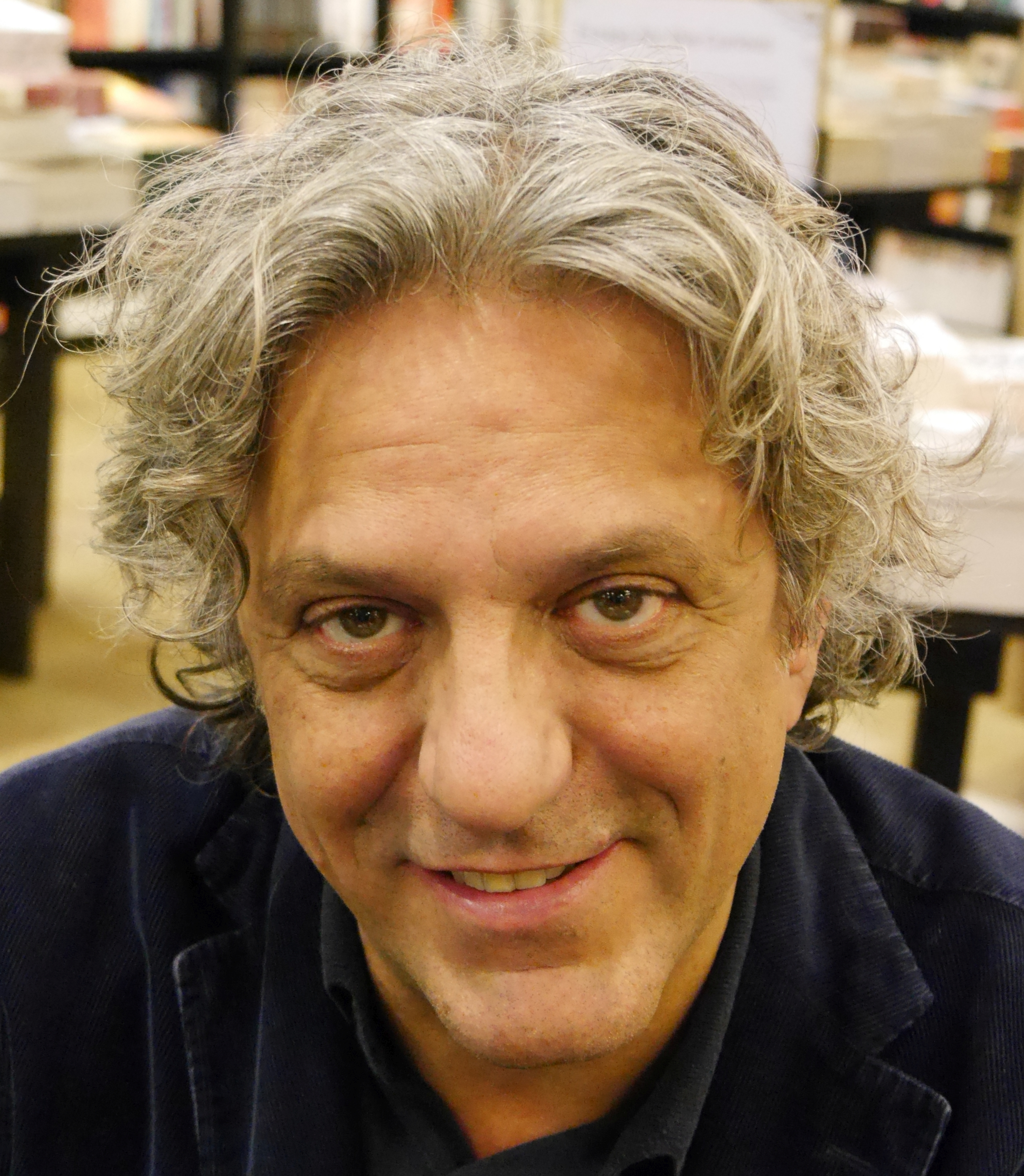
- Locatelli in 2018
- Born: 6 April 1963 (age 63); Corgeno, Lombardy, Italy
- Spouse: Plaxy
- Children: 2
- Culinary career
- Cooking style: Italian
- Ratings: Michelin stars; AA Rosettes
- Current restaurant: Osteria Locatelli at the National Gallery
- Previous restaurants: Locanda Locatelli (no longer held); Zafferano (no longer held); Olivo
- Television shows: MasterChef Italia (2018–present); Celebrity MasterChef (2026–present)

Giorgio Locatelli (born 6 April 1963) is an Italian Michelin-starred chef and restaurateur working and living in the United Kingdom.

== Early life ==
Locatelli was brought up in Corgeno in the comune of Vergiate on the banks of Lake Comabbio, northern Italy. His uncle ran a restaurant, the Michelin-star rated La Cinzianella, giving him an appreciation and understanding of food from an early age. After working for a short spell in local restaurants in Italy and in Switzerland, Locatelli went to England in 1986 to join the kitchens of Anton Edelmann at The Savoy. In 1990, Locatelli moved to Paris and worked at Restaurant Laurent and La Tour d'Argent. Locatelli was in the army in his youth.

== Culinary career ==
On his return to London a couple of years later, Locatelli opened Olivo Restaurant on Eccleston Street in Belgravia, before opening Zafferano in February 1995.

They won "Best Italian Restaurant" at the London Carlton Restaurant Awards for two consecutive years and their first Michelin star in 1999.

In February 2002, Locatelli and his wife, Plaxy, opened their first independent restaurant, Locanda Locatelli, on Seymour Street. The restaurant, which served traditional Italian dishes, was awarded a Michelin star in 2003, which it retained until its closure. Locanda Locatelli closed permanently in January 2025.

On 10 May 2025, Locatelli opened a new restaurant at the National Gallery in London.

== Media career ==
Locatelli has been featured in several TV series: Pure Italian was made in 2002 and aired on the UK Food channel; Tony and Giorgio, filmed with entrepreneur Tony Allan, was shown on BBC Two; and Italy Unpacked in 2011 as well as Sicily Unpacked in 2012 with art historian Andrew Graham-Dixon on BBC Two.

In January 2019, Locatelli became a judge of MasterChef Italia. In May of the same year, he was a guest on the Italian talk show EPCC (E poi c'è Cattelan) hosted by Alessandro Cattelan. There, he announced he would be coming back as a judge for the ninth season of MasterChef Italia. In 2022 and 2023, he co-hosted the cooking show Home Restaurant which aired on Sky Uno.

== Personal life ==
Locatelli lives with his English wife Plaxy and their two children, Margherita and Jack, in Camden, London. He also revealed he sometimes feels more British than Italian, having spent so many years in London.

== Bibliography ==
- Allan, Tony; Locatelli, Giorgio (2003). Tony & Giorgio. London, United Kingdom: Fourth Estate Ltd. ISBN 9780007141449. OCLC 48678366.
- Locatelli, Giorgio; Lepard, Dan (2006). Made in Italy: Food & Stories. London, United Kingdom: HarperCollins. ISBN 9781841157016. OCLC 892021705.
- Locatelli, Giorgio; Keating, Sheila; Linder, Lisa (2011). Made in Sicily. New York, NY: Ecco Press. ISBN 9780062130372. OCLC 757483605.
- Locatelli, Giorgio (2017). Made at Home. London, United Kingdom: Fourth Estate Ltd. ISBN 9780008100513. OCLC 1063639989.
