= Anton Edelmann =

Cookery writer

Anton Edelmann (born 1952) is a cookery writer who was maître chef des cuisines at the Savoy Hotel in London, England, from 1982 to 2003.

Edelmann was born in Germany in 1952 and worked as an apprentice chef in a village near Munich.

He appeared as a castaway on the BBC Radio programme Desert Island Discs on 18 April 1993.

He has an English wife.

== Bibliography ==
- —— (1993). Anton Edelmann Creative Cuisine. Pavilion Books. ISBN 978-1857930597.
- —— (1996). Anton Edelmann's Christmas Feast. Ted Smart. ISBN 978-0583326315.
- —— (2003). The Savoy Cookbook. Pavilion Books. ISBN 9781862053878.
