= Olivio (restaurant) =

Coordinates: 52°21′4.63″N 5°37′14.88″E

- Interactive map of Olivio

Restaurant information
- Established: abt. 2002
- Closed: mid March 2012
- Head chef: Wim Zwaart
- Food type: French
- Location: Vischmarkt 57L, Harderwijk, 3841 BE, Netherlands

Olivio is a defunct restaurant in Harderwijk, Netherlands. It was a fine dining restaurant that was awarded one Michelin star in 2002 and retained that rating until 2005.

Head chef of the restaurant was Wim Zwaart.

== See also ==
- List of Michelin starred restaurants in the Netherlands
