= Daniele Tinti =

Italian comedian (born 1990)

- Born: 11 July 1990 (age 35); Rome, Italy
- Occupation: Comedian
- Years active: 2014–present

Daniele Tinti (born 11 July 1990) is an Italian comedian. He is considered one of the most representative comedians of the stand-up comedy genre in Italy and one of the most popular Italian podcasters.

== Life and career ==
Born in Rome on 11 July 1990, Tinti grew up in L'Aquila, where he remained until the age of 19. He made his debut as a comedian in 2014 during the first open mic held in Italy.

In 2015, he began collaborating with Comedy Central, and he was selected to join the cast of the first edition of Natural Born Comedians. He continued working with Comedy Central in subsequent years, also as a writer and panelist on Saverio Raimondo's show CCN: Comedy Central News, and in various editions of Stand Up Comedy.

In 2018, Tinti toured with his first show, the autobiographical Ugos, which was recorded and released in 2021 by Rai 5 and Amazon Prime Video as part of the Italian Stand Up series. In 2019, he was a regular cast member of the first season of Battute? on Rai 2. He also appeared as a recurring guest on the comedy panel show Data Comedy Show, hosted by Francesco De Carlo in 2021.

Since 2018, Tinti has co-hosted the live podcast Tintoria with Stefano Rapone.

== Filmography ==
Film
Year	Title	Role	Notes
2021	Il grande caldo	Daniele	Also writer
2024	Flaminia	Guest	Cameo role

Television
Year	Title	Role	Notes
2025	Il Baracchino	John Lumano	TV series; main role
2025	Pesci piccoli	Tinto the puppet	TV series; episode 2x02

== Television programs ==
- Natural Born Comedians (Comedy Central, 2015–2016)
- Sorci verdi (Rai 2, 2015)
- CCN – Comedy Central News (Comedy Central, 2017–2018)
- Stand Up Comedy (Comedy Central, 2017–2020)
- Battute? (Rai 2, 2019)
- Italian Stand up (Rai 5, 2021)
- Data Comedy Show (Rai 2, 2021)
- In & Out (Sky Uno, 2025)
