= Carlo Cracco =

Italian chef (born 1965)

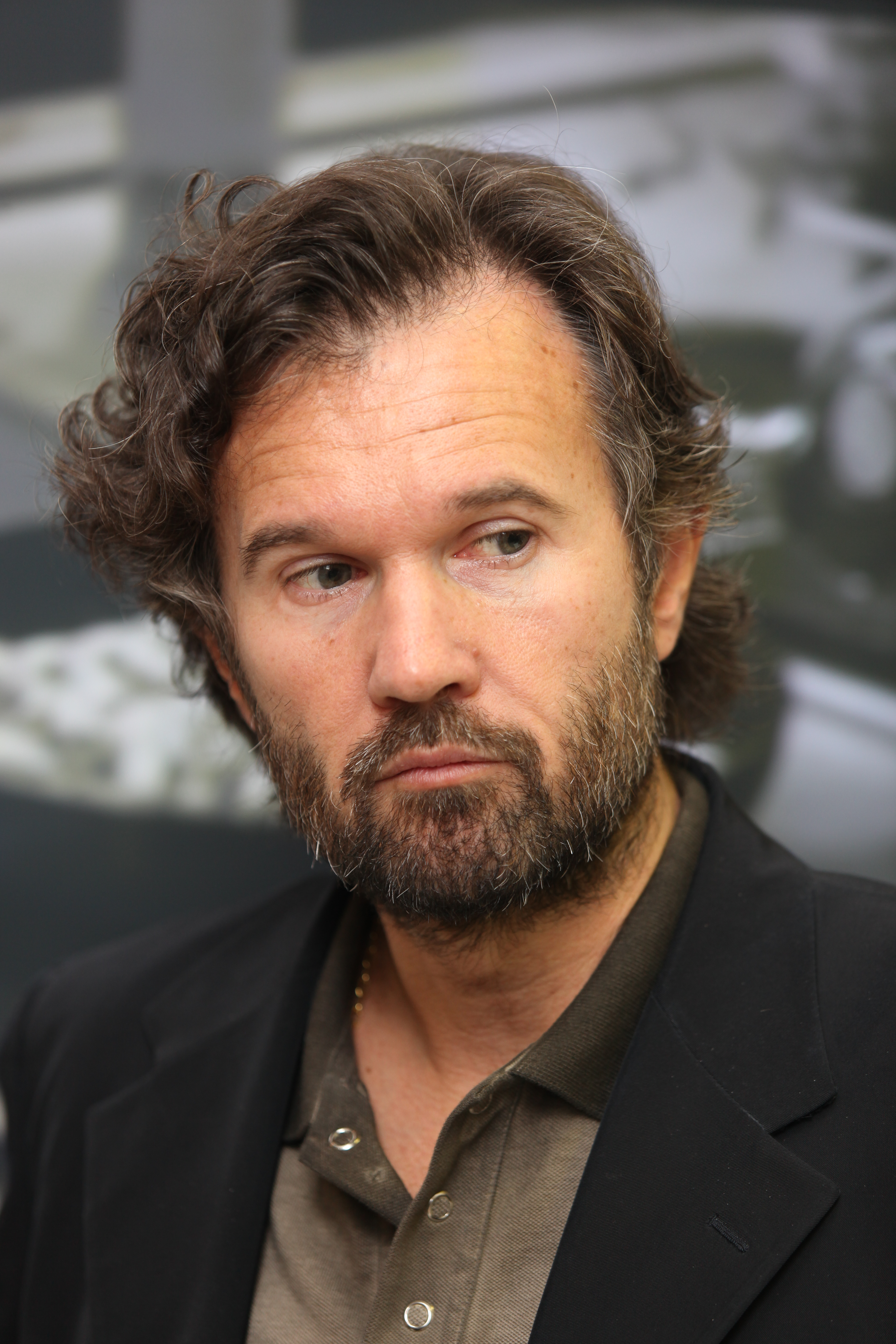
- Cracco at Taste of Milano 2013
- Born: 8 October 1965 (age 61); Creazzo, Veneto, Italy
- Education: Pellegrino Artusi
- Occupation: Chef

Carlo Cracco (born 8 October 1965) is an Italian chef and television personality.

Cracco in Galleria, his restaurant located in the Galleria Vittorio Emanuele II, Milan, has three "forks" from Gambero Rosso, one star in the Michelin Guide, and is in the World's 50 Best Restaurants.

== Biography ==
Cracco attended the Pellegrino Artusi institute of hospitality management in Recoaro Terme. After graduating, he worked at the restaurant "Da Remo" in Vicenza. In 1986 he began to collaborate with fellow chef Gualtiero Marchesi in Milan. Later, he worked at the restaurant at "La Meridiana", a resort in the province of Savona. Cracco then lived in France for three years, where he studied French culinary arts.

After that, Cracco returned to Italy, where he was chef at the Enoteca Pinchiorri in Florence. The restaurant was awarded two Michelin stars. Soon Cracco was invited by Gualtiero Marchesi to collaborate once again, this time on the opening of his new restaurant "L'Albereta" in the region of Lombardy, where Cracco worked as chef for three years. He then opened a restaurant in the Piedmont region called "Le Clivie", which earned a Michelin star.

A few years later, Cracco accepted an invitation from the Stoppani family, owners of the Peck marketplace in Milan, to open a new restaurant called "Cracco Peck". He continues to work there today as Executive Chef. Since 2007, the restaurant has been known simply as "Cracco". In 2018, the restaurant moved to the Galleria Vittorio Emanuele II and is now known as Cracco in Galleria.

The Italian food and wine magazine Gambero Rosso gave Cracco's restaurant three "forks" (their highest rating). In 2007, la Repubblica named it one of the 50 best restaurants in the world.

In February 2014, Cracco founded a bistro in Milan called "Carlo e Camilla in segheria" ('Carlo and Camilla in the sawmill'), which takes its name from the disused sawmill in which it resides.

In 2011, Cracco began hosting the show MasterChef Italia with Bruno Barbieri, Joe Bastianich and, since 2015, Antonino Cannavacciuolo. Cracco has served as president of the nonprofit organization Maestro Martino since 2012. On 13 February 2013 he appeared at the Sanremo Music Festival, to introduce the artist Annalisa. Cracco was a host on the first and second seasons of Hell's Kitchen Italia on the channel Sky Uno.

He received the America Award of the Italy–USA Foundation in 2019.

Cracco designed a menu for business and premium classes aboard the Milan–Paris Frecciarossa, which was inaugurated on 18 December 2021. The menu, which costs €18, was criticised for its poor quality, prompting Cracco to defend it in the press.

== Family ==
Cracco has two daughters from his first marriage, Sveva and Irene. He is currently married to Rosa Fanti, with whom he has two sons, Pietro and Cesare.

== Television ==
- MasterChef Italia, Cielo (2011); Sky Uno (2011–2016)
- Hell's Kitchen Italia (2014–)
- The Final Table (2018, episode: "Italy Challenge")
- RIP: Roast in Peace (2026, guest)
