= List of Italian films of 2024 =

A list of Italian-produced and co-produced feature films released or scheduled for release in Italy in 2024.

== Films ==
Title	Director	Cast	Notes	Ref
All We Imagine as Light	Payal Kapadia	Kani Kusruti, Divya Prabha, Chhaya Kadam, Hridhu Haroon, Azees Nedumangad		
Another End	Piero Messina	Gael García Bernal, Renate Reinsve, Bérénice Bejo, Olivia Williams		
Anywhere Anytime	Milad Tangshir	Ibrahima Sambou, Success Edemakhiota, Moussa Dicko Diango		
Beautiful Rebel (Sei nell'anima)	Cinzia Torrini	Letizia Toni, Selene Caramazza, Stefano Rossi Giordani, Teresa Tanini, Maurizio Lombardi		
Confidenza	Daniele Luchetti	Bruno Orlando, Elena Arvigo, Elena Bouryka, Elio Germano, Federica Rosellini, Giordano De Plano, Isabella Ferrari		
The Damned	Roberto Minervini	René W. Solomon, Jeremiah Knupp, Noah Carlson, Tim Carlson		
Gloria!	Margherita Vicario	Galatea Bellugi, Carlotta Gamba, Maria Vittoria Dallastra, Sara Mafodda, Veronica Lucchesi, Paolo Rossi		
Grand Tour	Miguel Gomes	Gonçalo Waddington, Crista Alfaiate, Cláudio da Silva, Lang Khê Tran, Jorge Andrade		
Here Now (Fino alla fine)	Gabriele Muccino	Elena Kampouris, Saul Nanni, Lorenzo Richelmy, Enrico Inserra		
A House on Fire	Dani de la Orden	Emma Vilarasau, Enric Auquer, Maria Rodríguez Soto, Alberto San Juan, Clara Segura		
Limonov: The Ballad	Kirill Serebrennikov	Ben Whishaw, Tomas Arana, Sandrine Bonnaire, Viktoria Miroshnichenko, Louis-Do de Lencquesaing		
Marcello Mio	Christophe Honoré	Chiara Mastroianni, Catherine Deneuve, Fabrice Luchini, Nicole Garcia, Benjamin Biolay, Melvil Poupaud		
My Place Is Here (Il mio posto è qui)	Cristiano Bortone, Daniela Porto	Ludovica Martino, Marco Leonardi, Anna Maria De Luca, Biancamaria D'Amato, Giorgia Arena		
Pare parecchio Parigi	Leonardo Pieraccioni	Leonardo Pieraccioni, Chiara Francini, Giulia Bevilacqua, Nino Frassica, Massimo Ceccherini		
Parthenope	Paolo Sorrentino	Stefania Sandrelli, Gary Oldman, Silvio Orlando, Luisa Ranieri, Peppe Lanzetta, Isabella Ferrari		
The Price of Nonna's Inheritance (Ricchi a tutti i costi)	Giovanni Bognetti	Christian De Sica, Angela Finocchiaro, Dharma Mangia Woods, Claudio Colica		
Still Fabulous (Pensati sexy)	Michela Andreozzi	Diana Del Bufalo, Valentina Nappi, Raoul Bova, Alessandro Tiberi, Angela Finocchiaro		
The Tearsmith (Fabbricante di lacrime)	Alessandro Genovesi	Simone Baldasseroni, Caterina Ferioli, Sabrina Paravicini, Alessandro Bedetti, Roberta Rovelli, Orlando Cinque		
Trifole	Gabriele Fabbro	Ydalie Turk, Umberto Orsini, Margherita Buy, Enzo Iacchetti		

== Box office ==
The ten highest-grossing Italian films in 2024, by in-year domestic box office gross revenue, are as follows:

Highest-grossing films of 2024
Rank	Title	Distributor	Admissions	Domestic gross (€)
1	The Boy with Pink Pants (Il ragazzo dai pantaloni rosa)	Eagle Pictures	1,400,000	9,000,000
2	Parthenope	Piper Film	1,000,000	7,500,000
3	A World Apart (Un mondo a parte)	Medusa Film	1,100,000	7,300,000
4	Diamonds	Vision Distribution	891,000	6,500,000
5	Io e te dobbiamo parlare	01 Distribution	850,000	6,400,000
6	It Happens in the Best of Families (Succede anche nelle migliori famiglie)	01 Distribution	812,000	5,700,000
7	Naples to New York (Napoli - New York)	01 Distribution	663,000	4,400,000
8	I soliti idioti 3 - Il ritorno	Medusa Film	504,000	3,900,000
9	There's Still Tomorrow (C'è ancora domani) ‡	Vision Distribution	616,000	3,900,000
10	The Great Ambition (Berlinguer. La grande ambizione)	Lucky Red	545,000	3,700,000
‡: 2023 theatrical opening

== See also ==
- 70th David di Donatello
- List of Italian films of 2025
