= Cracco in Galleria =

- Interactive map of Cracco in Galleria

Restaurant information
- Established: January 8, 2001; 25 years ago
- Owner: Carlo Cracco
- Head chef: Carlo Cracco
- Food type: Modern Italian
- Rating: World's 50 Best Restaurants
- Location: Galleria Vittorio Emanuele II, Milan, 20121, Italy
- Coordinates: 45°27′56″N 9°11′24″E
- Other locations: Portofino
- Website: www.ristorantecracco.it

Cracco in Galleria is a fine dining restaurant located in the Galleria Vittorio Emanuele II in Milan, Italy, owned by Italian celebrity chef Carlo Cracco, who is its head chef. The restaurant has three "forks" from Gambero Rosso, one star in the Michelin Guide, and in the World's 50 Best Restaurants.

It is located in a four-story facility within the Galleria and has a 10,000 bottle wine cellar. The space also features a café, chocolaterie, wine bar, patisserie and private lounge.

== History ==
Cracco originally opened the restaurant on 8 January 2001 in partnership with the Peck brothers who own Peck, the Italian gastronomy temple in Milan. At the time, it was known as Cracco Peck di Milan. The restaurant has won the award of best restaurant in the city multiple times. In 2007, the Pecks and Cracco dissolved their partnership and Cracco-Peck was renamed to be simply Cracco.

In 2015, Carlo Cracco successfully won the right to move the restaurant to the Galleria Vittorio Emanuele II. The rent for the space was reportedly agreed at 1.09€ million. In 2017, Cracco lost its second Michelin star ahead of its move into the Galleria. In 2018, the restaurant officially inaugurated its new location following the move as Cracco in Galleria. The new restaurant's design was created by the renowned Milanese architects Studio Peregalli.

In 2023, in la Repubblica claimed that the restaurant was operating at a loss and had accumulated 4.6€ million in debt due to high rent and taxes. The amount is split between debt to suppliers and a 2018 loan from Banca Popolare di Sondrio.

== Space and cuisine ==
Cracco's cooking at the restaurant has been reported to be influenced by the legendary Italian chef Gualtiero Marchesi. Some of Cracco's innovations at the restaurant have been described as "disobedient" to some traditions as he creates a "new era" in new Italian cuisine.

The restaurant has been awarded three "forks" by Gambero Rosso, one star by Michelin Guide, and is included in the World's 50 Best Restaurants.

It occupies a 1,118 square meter (10,764 square foot) space in the Galleria spread over five floors with three kitchens. When Cracco first won the right to the space before renovation in 2015, it consisted of three stories and had been abandoned since 2007.

The restaurant has opened a branch in Portofino, the first from Cracco offering a menu entirely without meat instead building its menu around fresh seafood.
