= Artribune =

Italian art magazine

- Artribune #72 front page, May-June 2023 issue
- Editorial director: Massimiliano Tonelli
- Categories: Art, culture
- Frequency: Bimonthly
- Format: 245 x 320 mm²
- Circulation: 55,000 (print, 2025)
- Publisher: Artribune Srl
- Founder: Massimiliano Tonelli
- Founded: March 2011
- First issue: May 2011; 14 years ago
- Country: Italy
- Based in: Rome
- Language: Italian
- Website: artribune.com
- ISSN: 2280-8817
- OCLC: 1314391339

Artribune is a nationally distributed Italian art magazine, based in Rome. It covers current exhibitions, artist interviews, reviews and analyses on topics such as the art market, architecture and design. The magazine was founded in 2011 and is available both as an online platform and in printed form, each with different content. It is published bimonthly with a circulation of 55,000 copies and is distributed in more than 650 locations throughout Italy.

== History ==
Since its foundation in 2011, Artribune is led by its founder and editor-in-chief Massimiliano Tonelli. The magazine is chaired by Paolo Cuccia, the president of Gambero Rosso.
After two years of existence, Il Giornale saw Artribune as a spokesperson that could tell the story of the art market and at the same time act as its counterpart. Within a few years Artribune positioned itself "as the principal platform of debate, news and investigations of visual culture in Italy". In 2015, Artribune produced the Street Art Roma map for the local administration of Rome and its website was recently restyled, partially financed through European funds. According to Italy's largest newspaper Corriere della Sera, Artribune is now, together with ArtsLife and Exibart, one of the best known online magazines, informing about and reviewing cultural events and exhibitions in Italy and worldwide. In 2021, Italy's leading newspaper La Repubblica reported on a racist comment by Massimiliano Tonelli about an African art exhibition in London, which the Artribune editorial staff distanced themselves from and for which the editor-in-chief apologized. In spring 2025, the art magazine Finestre sull'Arte expressed its solidarity after Tonelli was insulted by the press office of an exhibition following a critical article.

== Design ==
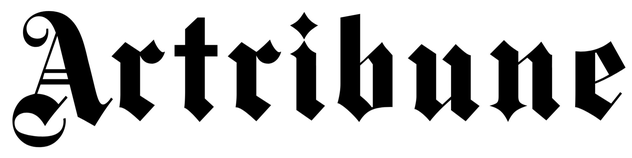
Artribune nameplate

The design of Artribune is reminiscent of the famous magazine International Herald Tribune and has also adopted the Gothic font of the cover. A profound editorial and graphic restyling was completed at the end of 2018. The majority of its covers are abstract or conceptual, in line with the magazine's content and style. From September 2022, the design school Istituto Europeo di Design has been making the covers of the magazine, "exploring contemporary themes such as the contamination between Art and Technology, Man and Nature, Real and Virtual".

== See also ==
- List of art magazines
