= Stefano Rapone =

Italian comedian and writer (born 1986)

- Rapone in 2025
- Born: 31 October 1986 (age 40); Rome, Italy
- Occupations: comedian; writer
- Years active: 2012–present

Stefano Rapone (born 31 October 1986) is an Italian comedian and writer.

== Life and career ==
Graduated in Japanese Language and Translation from Sapienza University of Rome, Rapone moved to Japan after completing his studies and began performing stand-up comedy in English in 2012. Over the years, he performed in various European cities, participated in Italy's first open mic in 2014, and joined the inaugural season of Natural Born Comedians on Comedy Central Italia in 2015.

He contributed to various Comedy Central programs, including CCN – Comedy Central News, and later joined the cast of Mai dire Talk (2018) on Italia 1, Battute? (2019) and Una pezza di Lundini (2020) on Rai 2. Rapone also appeared alongside Fiorella Mannoia on La versione di Fiorella on Rai 3 and joined Alessandro Cattelan's 2022 theatre tour. He also appeared in Gialappa Show on Sky Uno from 2023 to 2025.

In comics, Rapone authored graphic novels like Marco Travaglio Zombi (2014) and Natale a Gotham (2017). As a television author, he contributed to RaiPlay's La conferenza stampa. In October 2024, he published Racconti scritti da donne nude (Rizzoli Lizard), a collection of short stories.

Since 2018, Rapone has co-hosted the live podcast Tintoria with Daniele Tinti.

== Filmography ==
Film
Year	Title	Role	Notes
2019	Biagio	Himself	Short film
2023	Il migliore dei mondi	Carabiniere	
2024	Flaminia	Tommaso Boldrini	

Television
Year	Title	Role	Notes
2023	Sono Lillo	Himself	TV series; episode 5
2025	Il Baracchino	Marco	TV series; main role; voice role
2025	Pesci piccoli	Raponi	TV series; episode 2x02

== Television programs ==
- Natural Born Comedians (Comedy Central, 2015–2016)
- Sorci verdi (Rai 2, 2015)
- CCN – Comedy Central News (Comedy Central, 2017–2018)
- Stand Up Comedy (Comedy Central, 2017–2020)
- Mai dire Talk (Italia 1, 2018–2019)
- Takeshi's Castle (Comedy Central, 2019, also writer)
- Battute? (Rai 2, 2019)
- CCN – Il Salotto con Michela Giraud (Comedy Central, 2020)
- Una pezza di Lundini (Rai 2, 2020–2022)
- Quelli che il lunedì (Rai 2, 2021)
- Data Comedy Show (Rai 2, 2021)
- La versione di Fiorella (Rai 3, 2021–2022)
- La conferenza stampa (RaiPlay, 2022–present, also writer)
- Gialappa Show (Sky Uno, 2023–present)
- In & Out (TV8, 2025)
- RIP: Roast in Peace (Amazon Prime Video, 2025–2026)

== Works ==
- Stefano Rapone (2024). Racconti scritti da donne nude. Milan: Rizzoli Lizard.
