= Cuccia =

Cuccia is a surname of Italian origin. Notable people with the surname include:

- Enrico Cuccia (1907–2000), Italian banker
- Francesco Cuccia, also known as Don Ciccio (1876–1957), Italian member of the Sicilian Mafia
- Paolo Cuccia (born 1953), Italian businessman
- Salvo Cuccia (born 1960), Italian cinema director and screenwriter
- Vincenzo Cuccia (1892–1979), Italian fencer

== See also ==
- Cuccìa, Sicilian meal
