= Michela Giraud =

Italian actress and comedian (born 1987)

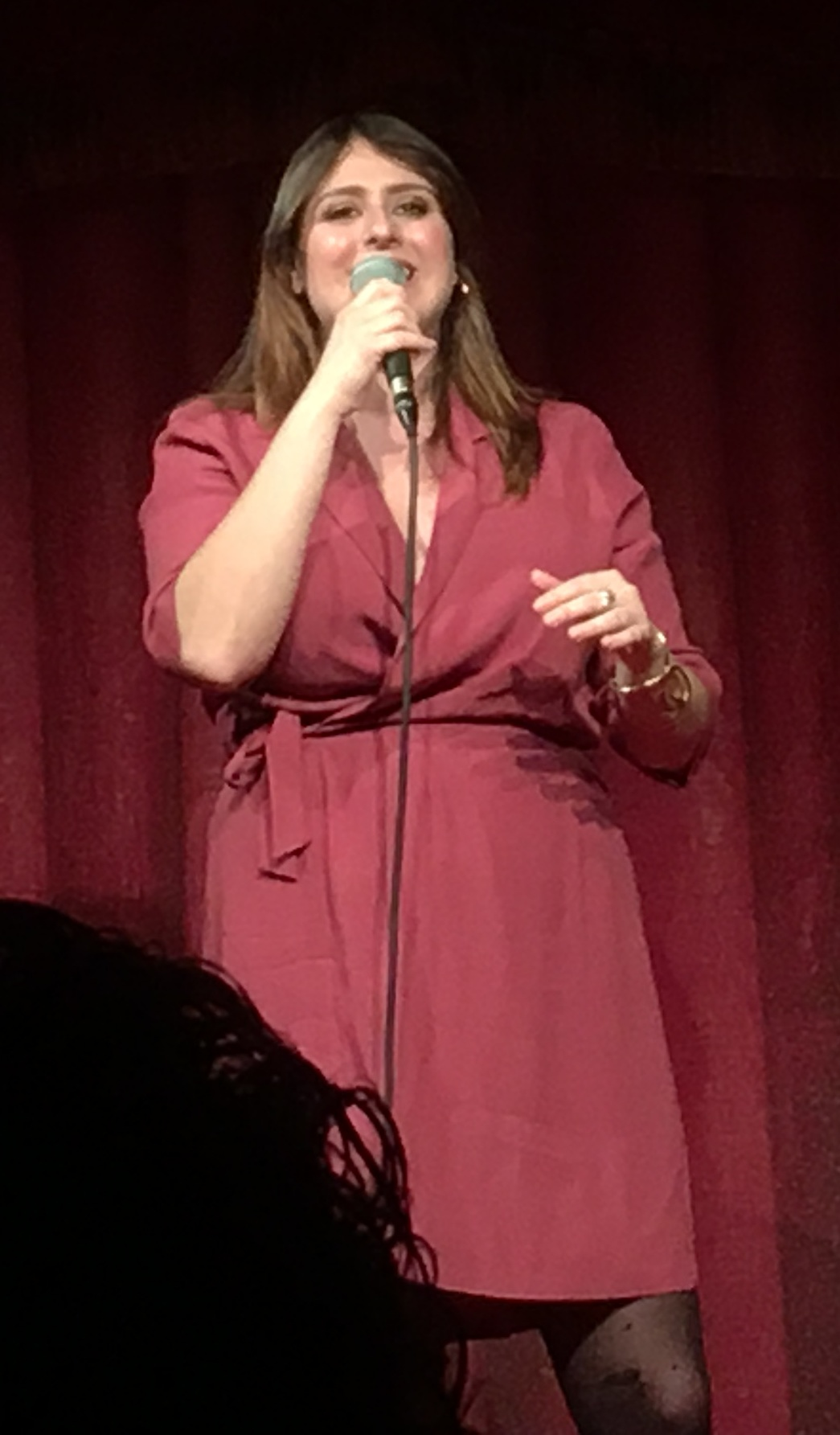
- Giraud in 2019
- Born: 28 July 1987 (age 39); Rome, Italy
- Occupations: Actor, comedian, TV presenter, film director
- Years active: 2015–present

Michela Giraud (Italian pronunciation: [miˈkɛːla ʒiˈro]; born 28 July 1987) is an Italian actress, film director, comedian and television presenter.

== Early life and education ==
Giraud was born in Rome to parents from Torre Annunziata, Naples. Her paternal great-grandfather Alfredo Giraud, of French descent, was president of the Torrese soccer team A.C. Savoia 1908 and is the namesake of the local stadium.

Raised in the Roman neighborhood of Balduina, Giraud graduated from the local Liceo Classico Mamiani, where she was classmates with comedian Edoardo Ferrario. In 2006, she enrolled at the Sapienza University of Rome, earning a bachelor's degree in historical and artistic studies in 2010, and later a master's degree in modern art history in 2013.

In 2011, she began studying acting at Teatro Azione, where she earned her acting diploma in 2013.

== Career ==
In 2015, Giraud joined the cast of Colorado on Italia 1, and later appeared in the cast of CCN - Comedy Central News on Comedy Central for three seasons. The following year, she made her film debut with a small role in the 2016 film I babysitter.

She has appeared as a writer and stand-up comedian on various television programs on Rai 2, Rai 3, and Rai 4. She has also worked as a radio host on Rai Radio 2. From 2020 to 2021, she was the host of CCN - Comedy Central News on Comedy Central.

In April 2021, she competed on the Amazon reality game show LOL - Chi ride è fuori. In June 2021, she was part of the cast of the film Mascarpone, directed by Matteo Pilati and Alessandro Guida. She reprised her role in the 2024 sequel Mascarpone: The Rainbow Cake.

In 2024, she made her directorial debut with Flaminia.

== Filmography ==
Film
| Year | Title | Role | Notes |
|---|---|---|---|
| 2016 | I babysitter | Marina | Film debut |
| 2020 | Permette? Alberto Sordi | Aurelia Sordi | TV film |
| 2021 | Mascarpone | Cristina | |
| 2021 | That's Fine | Nurse | |
| 2022 | Il mammone | Amalia | |
| 2023 | The Hottest Summer | Damiana | |
| 2024 | Mascarpone: The Rainbow Cake | Cristina | |
| 2024 | Flaminia | Flaminia | Also director and writer |

Television
| Year | Title | Role | Notes |
|---|---|---|---|
| 2020–2021 | Ritoccàti | Susanna | TV series; 3 episodes |
| 2023 | Sono Lillo | Herself | TV series; episode 6 |
| 2025 | Il Baracchino | Noemi Ciambell | TV series; main role; voice role |

== Television programs ==
- Colorado (Italia 1, 2015)
- Sorci Verdi (Rai 2, 2015)
- Challenge4 (Rai 4, 2016)
- Natural Born Comedians (Comedy Central, 2015–2017)
- CCN - Comedy Central News (Comedy Central, 2015–2021)
- Sbandati (Rai 2, 2017)
- La TV delle ragazze - Gli Stati Generali 1988-2018 (Rai 3, 2018)
- Mai dire Talk (Italia 1, 2018–2019)
- Il posto giusto (Rai 3, 2019)
- Comedians Solve Problems (Comedy Central, 2019)
- Stand Up Comedy (Comedy Central, 2019)
- CCN - Il Salotto con Michela Giraud (Comedy Central, 2020–2021)
- Quelli che... il Calcio (Rai 2, 2020–2021)
- SEAT Music Awards - Disco Estate (Rai 1, 2021)
- C'era una volta... l'amore (Real Time, 2021)
- LOL - Chi ride è fuori (Amazon Prime Video, 2021) – contestant
- Michela Giraud: The Truth, I Swear! (Netflix, 2022)
- Michelle Impossible (Canale 5, 2022)
- Diversity Media Awards (Rai 1, 2022)
- Drag Race Italia (Discovery+, 2022) – guest
- In & Out (TV8, 2025)
- RIP: Roast in Peace (Amazon Prime Video, 2025–2026) – host
