= Neva Leoni =

Italian actress (born 1992)

- Born: Neva Leoni; 2 September 1992 (age 34); Rome, Lazio, Italy
- Occupation: Actress
- Height: 1.68 m (5 ft 6.14 in)
- Spouse: Claudio Colica (m. 2022)

Neva Leoni (born 2 September 1992) is an Italian actress.

== Biography ==
Born in Rome, Neva Leoni, after graduating from the "Dante Alighieri" state classical high school, attended the Ro.Gi singing school for two years, then the Saint Louis singing school and a course at the Circo a Vapore international theatre academy.

== Career ==
As a teenager, she landed several supporting roles in film and television, most notably in Giovanni Veronesi's comedy Genitori & figli – Agitare bene prima dell'uso. She later chose to finish her studies before resuming her acting career. In 2014, she starred alongside Stephen Baldwin, Danny Glover, Daryl Hannah, and Michael Madsen in Alessandro Capone's science fiction film 2047: Sights of Death.

In 2014, she was part of the cast of the third season of the TV series Che Dio ci aiuti, appearing as a guest star in the first episode of the fourth and reprising her role in episode 17 of the eighth season in 2025. In 2016, she was among the main characters in the series Questo nostro amore, directed by Isabella Leoni. From 2018 to 2022, she took part in the series The Ladies' Paradise (Il paradiso delle signore) in the role of Tina Amato. In 2023 and 2024 she played the role of Lara De Gracis in the series Il patriarca, alongside Claudio Amendola.

== Personal life ==
Since 2022 she has been married to comedian Claudio Colica of the duo Le Coliche.

== Filmography ==
Film
Year	Title	Role	Notes
2008	Italian Dream		
2009	Parents and Children: Shake Well Before Using	Clarissa	
2014	Blame Freud	Friend of Emma Tamelli	
2014	I Can Quit Whenever I Want	Neva	
2014	2047: Sights of Death	Tuag	
2015	The Answer	Amelie	Television film
2016	Miami Beach	Giulia	
2017	Non c'è campo	Carlotta	
2018	Tiburtina 63		Short film
2019	I miei supereroi	Viviana	Short film
2021	Fellini Forward	Woman in red	
2024	Finché notte non ci separi	Ester / Sara	
2025	Make a Wish	Marta	

Television series
Year	Title	Role	Network	Notes
2010	R.I.S. Roma – Delitti imperfetti	Mita's sister	Canale 5	Episode 1x12
2014, 2017, 2025	Che Dio ci aiuti	Rosa Francini	Rai 1	22 episodes
2015	Solo per amore	Martina	Canale 5	5 episodes
2015	Questo è il mio paese	Maria "Monique"	Rai 1	Episode 1 (miniseries)
2017–2018	Questo nostro amore	Clara	Rai 1	8 episodes
2018–2019, 2021–2022	The Ladies' Paradise	Concetta "Tina" Amato	Rai 1	243 episodes (soap opera)
2020–2023	Ritoccàti	Vanessa	Sky Uno	15 episodes
2021, 2023	Cuori	Serenella Rinaldi	Rai 1	28 episodes
2023–2024	Il patriarca	Lara De Grecis	Canale 5	24 episodes
2025	Belcanto	Olimpia De Marchi	Rai 1	8 episodes

== Theater ==
Year	Title	Author	Director
2013	Romeo e Giulietta	William Shakespeare	Gigi Proietti
2016	Racconto d'inverno	William Shakespeare	Elena Sbardella
2018	Quattro cani per un osso	John Patrick Shanley	John Pepper
