= Colica =

Colica is an Italian surname. Notable people with the surname include:

- Claudio Colica (born 1988), Italian actor, comedian and screenwriter
- Fabrizio Colica (born 1991), Italian actor and comedian
