= Saverio Raimondo =

Italian comedian and writer (born 1984)

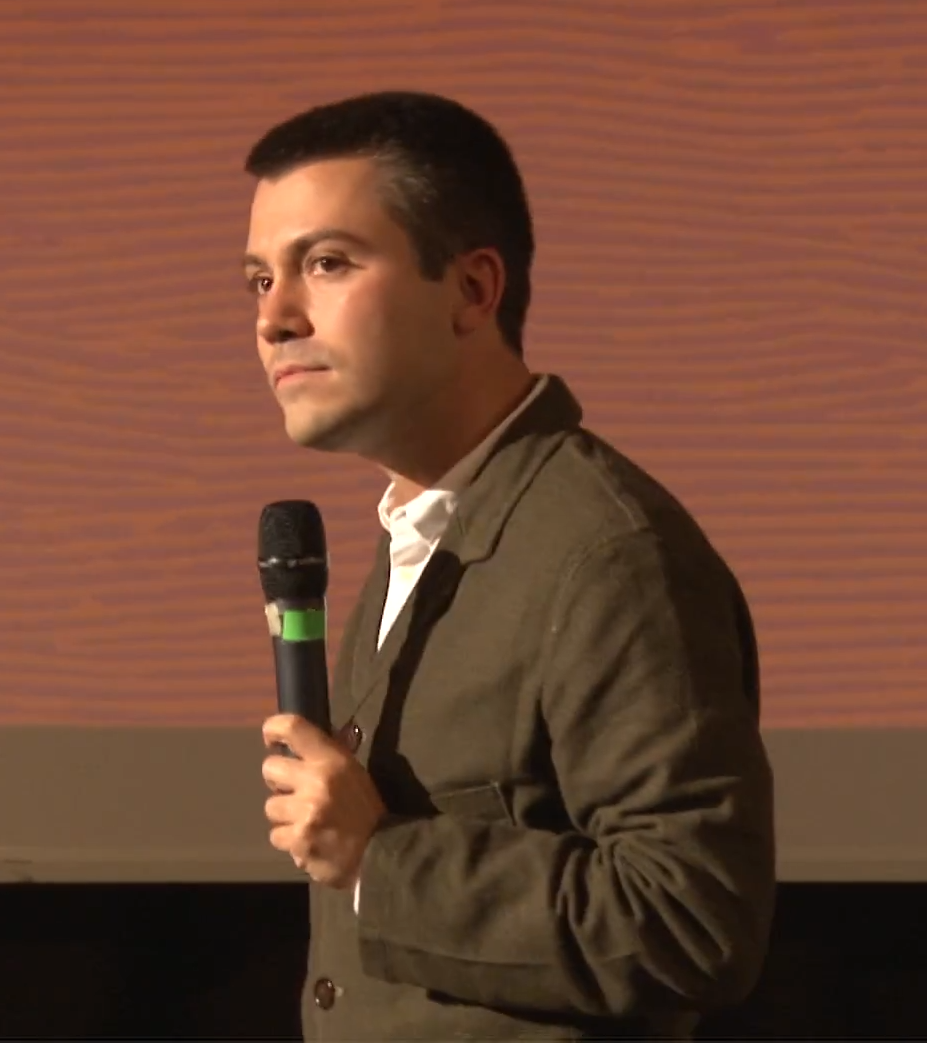
- Raimondo in 2016
- Born: 20 January 1984 (age 42); Rome, Italy
- Occupations: comedian; writer; voice actor; television host; radio host
- Years active: 2002–present

Saverio Raimondo (born 10 January 1984) is an Italian comedian, writer, voice actor, radio and television host. He has collaborated as an author, comedian and host on various television and radio programs for Rai Radio 2, Rai 3, La7, and Comedy Central. He has written as a columnist for Il Fatto Quotidiano, Il Foglio, and La Repubblica.

== Career ==
Raimondo created and hosted CCN: Comedy Central News from 2015, for which he was awarded the "Forte dei Marmi" Political Satire Prize of TV in 2016. At the Sanremo Music Festival 2015, he presented Dopofestival ("After-festival") alongside Sabrina Nobile. He commentated on the Eurovision Song Contest 2018 semi-finals together with Carolina Di Domenico, live on Rai 4. His show Il satiro parlante was distributed by Netflix in May 2019. In December 2020, Raimondo made his debut on Rai 4 in prime time with Pigiama Rave. Together with Ema Stokholma, he was the Italian commentator of the Eurovision Song Contest 2021.

In 2021, Raimondo lent his voice to Ercole Visconti, the villain of Pixar's 24th animated film Luca, both in the original English version and the Italian dubbing. In the same year, he also starred in the feature film Angela and I, directed by Herbert Simone Paragnani, once again in a villainous role.

== Filmography ==
Film
Year	Title	Role	Notes
2014	Amore oggi	Serafini	Television film
2021	Luca	Ercole Visconti	Voice role
2021	Angela and I	Nero	
2022	Belli ciao	Fumagalli	
2024	Flaminia	Agenore	
2027	Gatto	Ugo	Voice role

Television
Year	Title	Role	Notes
2023	Dov'è Mario?	Fabrizio Capoccetti	TV series; episode 1x01

== Television programs (selection) ==
- CCN – Comedy Central News (Comedy Central, 2015–2019)
- Stand Up Comedy (Comedy Central, 2014–2017, 2022, 2024)
- Pigiama Rave (Rai 4, 2020–2021)
- Data Comedy Show (Rai 2, 2021)
- In & Out (Sky Uno, 2025)

== Works ==
- Saverio Raimondo (2018). Stiamo calmi. Come ho imparato a non preoccuparmi e ad amare l'ansia. Milan: Feltrinelli.
- Saverio Raimondo (2019). Io esisto. Babbo Natale vuota il sacco. DeA Planeta.
- Saverio Raimondo (2022). Memorie di un elettore riluttante. Milan: Feltrinelli.
