= Angela and I =

2021 Italian comedy film

- Italian: Io e Angela
- Directed by: Herbert Simone Paragnani
- Written by: Herbert Simone Paragnani; Gianni Corsi
- Starring: Ilenia Pastorelli; Pietro Sermonti
- Cinematography: Giovanni Macedonio
- Edited by: Mauro Bonanni
- Music by: Andrea Bonini
- Distributed by: Eagle Pictures
- Release date: 10 November 2021
- Running time: 99 minutes
- Country: Italy
- Language: Italian

Angela and I (Italian: Io e Angela) is a 2021 Italian black comedy film written and directed by Herbert Simone Paragnani and starring Ilenia Pastorelli and Pietro Sermonti.

== Cast ==
- Ilenia Pastorelli as Angela
- Pietro Sermonti as Arturo
- Eugenio Franceschini as Jimbo
- Saverio Raimondo as Nero
- Corinne Cléry as Patrizia
- Nini Salerno as the General
- Alessandro Cremona as Victor
- Massimiliano Vado as Andrea
- Carlotta Rondana as Carolina
- Maurizio Lops as the farmer
- Chiara Tron as Rosa

== Release ==
The film was presented to the press at a series of preview screenings in October 2021. It was made available on Rakuten TV on 10 November 2021, before making its television premiere on Sky Cinema on 4 January 2022.
