= Il Baracchino =

- Genre: Adult animation; Comedy drama
- Created by: Nicolò Cuccì; Salvo Di Paola
- Directed by: Nicolò Cuccì; Salvo Di Paola
- Music by: Giuseppe Vasapolli; Mariano Restivo; Nicolò Cuccì; Salvo Di Paola
- Country of origin: Italy
- Original language: Italian
- No. of seasons: 1
- No. of episodes: 6

Production
- Executive producers: Miriam Del Prete (Lucky Red); Nicolò Cuccì (Megadrago); Francesco Siddi (Megadrago)
- Producers: Andrea Occhipinti; Stefano Massenzi; Serena Sostegni
- Production companies: Lucky Red; Megadrago

Original release
- Network: Amazon Prime Video
- Release: 3 June 2025 – present

Il Baracchino (Italian: The Hut) is an Italian adult animated comedy drama television series created by Nicolò Cuccì and Salvo Di Paola. It follows Claudia, a young aspiring art director who decides to save the titular stand-up comedy club from closure. The series is produced by Lucky Red and Megadrago and released internationally on Amazon Prime Video on 3 June 2025.

== Plot ==
Il Baracchino (lit. "The Hut"), once famous comedy club and a reference point for aspiring comedians, is now reduced to ruin. Maurizio, the owner, is now resigned to definitively close the business. The situation changes when Claudia, a young aspiring art director, decides not to give up to the decline of the place. In order to relaunch the Baracchino, Maurizio convinces to organize an open mic evening, recruiting for the event a miscellaneous group of comedians with surreal characteristics.

== Cast ==
- Pilar Fogliati as Claudia, an idealist aspiring art director who opposes the club's closure.
- Pasquale Petrolo as Maurizio, the club owner, a unicorn now disillusioned and tired.
- Salvo Di Paola as Gerri, the club's handyman.
- Edoardo Ferrario as Leonardo da Vinci, the famous Renaissance genius in boomer version.
- Luca Ravenna as Luca, a smoker pidgeon with caustic humour.
- Stefano Rapone as Marco, Death himself.
- Daniele Tinti as John Lumano (lit. "John Thehuman"), an alien who clumsily pretends being a human.
- Michela Giraud as Noemi Ciambell, a little donut with a bitter personality.
- Yoko Yamada as Tricerita, a punk triceratops who suffers eco-anxiety.
- Pietro Sermonti, as Larry Tucano, a comedy legend.
- Frank Matano as Donato, a donut with existential crisis.

== Production ==
The series is produced by Lucky Red and Prime Video, and animated by Palermo-based studio Megadrago.

== Episodes ==
No.	Title	Directed by	Written by	Original release date
1	"Claudia entra in un caffè"	Nicolò Cuccì & Salvo Di Paola	Matteo Calzolaio, Nicolò Cuccì, Salvo Di Paola & Tommaso Renzoni	3 June 2025
Young art director Claudia tries to save Il Baracchino by convincing the reluctant owner Maurizio to organize an evening with unlikely comedians.
2	"Il colmo per un unicorno"	Nicolò Cuccì & Salvo Di Paola	Matteo Calzolaio, Nicolò Cuccì, Salvo Di Paola & Tommaso Renzoni	3 June 2025
After the first evening's failure, Maurizio is now determined to close Il Baracchino. Claudia tries everything by playing on Maurizio's heart.
3	"Ridere ma anche riflettere"	Nicolò Cuccì & Salvo Di Paola	Matteo Calzolaio, Nicolò Cuccì, Salvo Di Paola & Tommaso Renzoni	3 June 2025
Maurizio agrees to help Claudia with a crash course in comedy, while Gerri and Larry search for the legendary perfect joke hidden in the club.
4	"Non si può dire più niente"	Nicolò Cuccì & Salvo Di Paola	Matteo Calzolaio, Nicolò Cuccì, Salvo Di Paola & Tommaso Renzoni	3 June 2025
Claudia organizes a trial night with a difficult audience composed of Donato's relatives, while Gerri and Larry make a discovery that could change the fate of the place.
5	"Toc Toc"	Nicolò Cuccì & Salvo Di Paola	Matteo Calzolaio, Nicolò Cuccì, Salvo Di Paola & Tommaso Renzoni	3 June 2025
In a flashback to sixteen months earlier, Claudia and Maurizio meet in the hospital and retrace the history of the decline of the Baracchino, while in the present Larry, Marco, Leonardo and Gerri confess in front of the camera about their relationship with mourning.
6	"SPLASH!"	Nicolò Cuccì & Salvo Di Paola	Matteo Calzolaio, Nicolò Cuccì, Salvo Di Paola & Tommaso Renzoni	3 June 2025
Il Baracchino is ready to reopen, but a figure from the past threatens to ruin everything, forcing Claudia and Maurizio to join forces to save the place.
