= Mascarpone: The Rainbow Cake =

- Italian: Maschile plurale
- Directed by: Alessandro Guida
- Written by: Giuseppe Paternò Raddusa; Gaia Marianna Musacchio; Alessandro Guida
- Produced by: Marco De Angelis; Nicola De Angelis; Matteo Pilati
- Starring: Giancarlo Commare; Gianmarco Saurino; Michela Giraud; Andrea Fuorto
- Cinematography: Giuseppe Chessa
- Edited by: Marco Garavaglia
- Music by: Marta Venturini
- Release date: 15 February 2024 (Italy)
- Running time: 105 minutes
- Country: Italy
- Language: Italian

Mascarpone: The Rainbow Cake (Italian: Maschile plurale, lit. 'Masculine plural') is a 2024 Italian romantic comedy film directed by Alessandro Guida, starring Giancarlo Commare, Gianmarco Saurino, Michela Giraud, and Andrea Fuorto. It is a sequel to the 2021 film Mascarpone.

== Cast ==
- Giancarlo Commare as Antonio
- Gianmarco Saurino as Luca
- Michela Giraud as Cristina
- Andrea Fuorto as Tancredi
- Giulio Corso as Dario
- Francesco Gheghi as Ricky
- Marta Filippi as Jamila
- Mirko Trovato as Salvo
- Lidia Vitale as Gaia Trevis
- Francesco Castaldi as Stefano
- Francesca Nunzi as Agnese
- Claudio Colica as Pietro
- Nicole Rossi as Tamara
- Luca Melucci as Ivan
- Marianna Di Martino as Tilde
- Riccardo Mandolini as Oscar
- Giorgia Trasselli as Graziana

== Release ==
The film was released in Italy on 14 February 2024. It was later released on Prime Video on 20 June 2024. It is also available on GagaOOLala.
