= Sei più bravo di un ragazzino di 5ª? =

Italian game show

- Presented by: Riccardo Rossi
- Country of origin: Italy

Production
- Running time: 35 minutes

Original release
- Network: SKY Uno
- Release: February 27, 2007

Sei più bravo di un ragazzino di 5ª? (Italian: Are you more skilful than a 5th grader?) is an Italian game show based on the original American format of Are You Smarter Than a 5th Grader?. The show is hosted by Massimiliano Ossini. Currently is exclusively shown on the Italian television channels SKY Uno and Cielo.
