= Flaminia (film) =

2024 Italian comedy film

- Theatrical release poster
- Directed by: Michela Giraud
- Written by: Michela Giraud; Francesco Marioni; Greta Scicchitano; Marco Vicari
- Produced by: Stefano Basso; Giuseppe Saccà; Agostino Saccà
- Starring: Michela Giraud
- Cinematography: Manfredo Archinto
- Edited by: Ilenia Galasso
- Music by: Fabio Frizzi
- Production companies: Eagle Original Content; Pepito Produzioni; Vision Distribution; Amazon Prime Video
- Release date: 11 April 2024 (Italy)
- Running time: 93 minutes
- Country: Italy
- Language: Italian
- Box office: $206,381

Flaminia is a 2024 Italian comedy film written and directed by Michela Giraud at her directorial debut.

The film was theatrically released in Italy on 11 April 2024.

== Plot ==
Flaminia De Angelis is a 30-year-old researcher at La Sapienza University from northern Rome. She is the daughter of Francesca and Guido Maria De Angelis, a plastic surgeon who has become wealthy over the course of his career. Flaminia spends her time with friends Vittoria, Costanza, and Diletta, enjoying fancy clothes, spas, and gyms. However, they don't fully accept her since their families have been rich for generations. Under pressure from her mother, Flaminia is preparing to marry Alberto De Rotier, the son of a well-known diplomat. This marriage would help the De Angelis family climb the social ladder. Even though Flaminia knows Alberto has cheated with her friends and has a drug problem, she remains hopeful and sets a wedding date.

A few weeks before the wedding, Ludovica, Flaminia's half-sister from her father's earlier relationship, arrives unannounced. Ludovica has autism and was kicked out of a therapy center for setting her room on fire. She must now live with the De Angelis family. Flaminia fears that Ludovica will ruin her chances for a better life, so she tries to send her back to the therapy center, refusing to define herself as her sister.

As the two sisters clash due to their different personalities, Flaminia starts to see the lies she has accepted in her life. This causes her to reconnect with the bond they once shared as children.

During Flaminia's bachelorette party, Ludovica has a breakdown at the sight of fire and is admitted to the hospital. Flaminia cuts off her relationship with her friends, who had shown disdain towards Ludovica, and decides to meet her ex-boyfriend, Andrea, who works as a personal trainer at a gym. Flaminia reveals to Andrea that she has never stopped thinking about him. The two kiss, but before having sex, Flaminia leaves. On the wedding day, Flaminia discovers that her mother had Ludovica committed to the therapy center again, so she wouldn't embarrass them on such an important day. Her father brings Flaminia a recording of their favorite song that Ludovica had recorded for her from the therapy center. However, while listening, Flaminia hears one of the nurses verbally abusing Ludovica and realizes that she had been encouraged by him to set the room on fire. Flaminia and her father rush to the therapy center and, after confronting the nurse, are reunited with Ludovica. Flaminia proudly declares that she is Ludovica's sister.

== Cast ==
- Michela Giraud as Flaminia De Angelis
- Rita Abela as Ludovica De Angelis
- Antonello Fassari as Guido Maria De Angelis
- Nina Soldano as Jacqueline De Rotier
- Edoardo Purgatori as Alberto De Rotier
- Catherine Bertoni de Laet as Vittoria
- Ludovica Bizzaglia as Costanza
- Francesca Valtorta as Diletta
- Fabrizio Colica as Dr. Marini
- Lucrezia Lante della Rovere as Francesca De Angelis
- Enzo Salvi as Mario
- Saverio Raimondo as Agenore
- Stefano Rapone as Tommaso Boldrini
- Daniele Tinti as a guest
- Andrea Purgatori as Mr. De Rotier
- Noli Sta Isabel as Brian
- Maria Teresa Borela Baluyot as Kamala
- Matteo Milani as Andrea
- Giulio Forges Davanzati as the make-up artist
- Andrea Venditti as a nurse at the therapy center
- Caterina Marino as a nurse at the therapy center
- Teresa Morici as Alice Boldrini
