= Hell's Kitchen Italia =

- Genre: Reality television
- Created by: Gordon Ramsay
- Directed by: Umberto Spinazzola (season 1–5)
- Starring: Carlo Cracco
- Narrated by: Dario Oppido
- Opening theme: Welcome to hell
- Country of origin: Italy
- Original language: Italian
- No. of seasons: 5
- No. of episodes: 56

Production
- Executive producer: Carlo Cracco
- Running time: 42 minutes
- Production companies: Magnolia (seasons 1–3); DryMedia (seasons 4–5)

Original release
- Network: Sky Uno
- Release: April 17, 2014 – December 21, 2018

Related
- Hell's Kitchen (British TV series)

Hell's Kitchen is an Italian reality television cooking competition (based on the British series of the same name) and American version broadcast on Fox. The Italian format is broadcast on Sky Uno from 2014 to 2018. It is hosted by celebrity chef Carlo Cracco.

== Format ==
The Italian format reflects the American version. Two teams of aspiring chefs, equally divided between men and women, challenge tests with cooking and table service at the restaurant Hell's Kitchen, supervised and judged by chef Carlo Cracco. There may be as many as 16 chefs in the first and second edition. A key feature of the program is the psychological pressure to which chef Cracco submits competitors; in fact, he does not hesitate to turn to them using particularly offensive insults and epithets, to criticize or scold them, get them to work more efficiently, or even to drive them out of the kitchen.

Each season opens with competitors, always divided between men and women, presenting to a dish to chef Cracco, in an attempt to showcase their talents. Starting next episode, the first part of each episode consists of a challenge between the two teams (when there are fewer competitors, these challenges become individual.) In the final stage the colors of the two jackets disappear, to make room for the coveted black jackets. Whoever wins these challenges (which can also occur externally) is rewarded with a particularly entertaining or relaxing excursion. The losers, however, remain at Hell's Kitchen, or in a place outside, to serve a punishment consisting of very tiring, and, in some cases, humiliating, labor. The result of these tests, however, has no influence on what will be the final judgment of the episode.

In the second part of the episode, the contestants have to cook the dishes for restaurant customers (about 70), half of which are served by the blue team and the other half by the red, and Cracco with his sous chefs will check their quality. Based on the work done, Cracco decides which of the two teams was the worst, or both teams might be losers. Among either or both teams, Cracco will choose a chef who stood out positively over the others; they will be requested to nominate two teammates, including themselves. Cracco will choose who will be eliminated from the game. However, it is also possible that Cracco decides not to take these into account at time of nomination; he may eliminate competitors who have not been appointed, even those who belonged to the winning team, by virtue of their poor performance or inappropriate behavior. Similarly, competitors may be directly disposed of during the evening service, while in other cases no one is eliminated.

Starting in Season 4 in 2017, a new format was launched as follows: instead of rewards and punishments, the team that loses the challenge must undertake a separate task individually. Cracco will judge each team member's dish in order and anyone who beats a teammate is declared "safe". After all dishes have been judged, the worst performer is declared ineligible to participate in that evening's dinner service, effectively leaving their team short-handed. After dinner service, either or both losing teams must nominate their worst performers and Cracco will decide who was the worst of them all. This individual, as well as the loser of the individual challenge, face off against each other in a Cook For Your Life showdown, with the loser having to leave the competition altogether.

In fact, a difference of Hell's Kitchen from most reality show is that the contestants are not judged by an audience, a tele-voting, jury or other forms of score any decision about their continuation in the race; it is solely Cracco.

Chef Carlo Cracco runs the kitchen with the help of two sous-chefs: Omar Allievi and Entiana Osmenzeza in first edition, in second edition Misha Sukyas and Marion Lichtle, in third edition Sybil Cardone and Mirko Ronzoni, who coordinate the work of two teams of apprentices. Managing the relationship with customers is the maître'd Luca Cinacchi (his nickname is Luchino).

In the final episode the sous-chefs and the guest star (In the first edition Bruno Barbieri, in second edition Matteo Grandi, the winner of first edition) are tasked to sabotage the flow of the finalists, to test their awareness during the service.

== Series overview ==
Season	Original run	Winner	Runner-up	Reason for winning	Contestants	Winner's prize
1	April 17, 2014 – June 5, 2014	Matteo Grandi	Sybil Carbone	High standards	17	(Italy) Hell's Kitchen Restaurant in Forte Village Resort to Santa Margherita di Pula (Sardinia)
2	May 21, 2015 - July 9, 2015	Mirko Ronzoni	Chiara Pannozzo		17	(Italy) Hell's Kitchen Restaurant in Forte Village Resort to Santa Margherita di Pula (Sardinia)
3	October 4, 2016 - November 22, 2016	Carlotta Delicato	Guglielmo Romani		17	(Italy) JW Marriott to Isola delle Rose (Venice)
4	October 3, 2017 - November 21, 2017	Mohamed Lamnaour	Erika Ciaccia		14	(Italy) JW Marriott to Isola delle Rose (Venice)
5	November 6, 2018 - December 21, 2018	Nicola Pepe	Ginevra Bassetti		20	(Italy) JW Marriott to Isola delle Rose (Venice)

== Season 1 ==
=== Contestants ===
Contestant	Age	Occupation	Hometown
Matteo Grandi	23	Chef	Soave, Veneto
Sybil Carbone	32	Chef	Alassio, Liguria
Carmelo Calabrese	29	Executive Chef	Catania, Sicily
Francesca Fogliata	19	Sous Chef	Chiari, Lombardy
Eugenio "Gene" Bertino	37	Chef de Partie	Turin, Piedmont
Laura De Luca	30	Cook	Anzio, Lazio
Lorenza Alcantara	26	Chef de partie	Parma, Emilia-Romagna
Gianluca Panigada	35	Chef de Partie	Milan, Lombardy
Pasquale "Lillo" Mantova	36	Cook/Culinary instructor	Gressan, Valle d'Aosta
Tommaso Gaggioli	36	Sous Chef	Massa Marittima, Tuscany
Andrea Tiradossi	24	Personal Chef	Ripa, Umbria
Amelia Mazzola	30	Responsabile di sala	Massa Lubrense, Campania
Simone Bottazzi	23	Chef de Partie	Bressana Bottarone, Lombardy
Sara Di Palma	30	Chef	La Spezia, Liguria
Lorena Mabel Palumbo	32	Responsabile di sala	Vigevano, Lombardy
Barbara Marie Borasio	26	Cook	Rome, Lazio
Rosario Stumpo	34	Chef de Partie	Milan, Lombardy

=== Contestant progress ===
		Original teams			First switch		With Tommaso			Second switch	Third switch			Individual			Final
N.	Chef	101	102	103	104	105	106	107	108	109	110	111	112	113	114	115	116
1	Matteo	IN	LOSE	WIN	BoW	LOSE	LOSE	NOM	LOSE	LOSE	LOSE	WIN	WIN	IN	IN	IN	WINNER
2	Sybil	IN	LOSE	NOM	WIN	NOM	WIN	WIN	WIN	LOSE	BoW	WIN	WIN	IN	IN	IN	RUNNER-UP
3	Carmelo	IN	LOSE	WIN	WIN	LOSE	WIN	WIN	WIN	NOM	LOSE	WIN	WIN	IN	IN	IN	THIRD
4	Francesca	IN	LOSE	LOSE	WIN	LOSE	WIN	WIN	WIN	LOSE	NOM	LOSE	LOSE	IN	NOM	OUT	
5	Gene	IN	NOM	WIN	LOSE	NOM	LOSE	BoW	NOM	NOM	BoW	NOM	NOM	IN	OUT		
6	Laura	IN	LOSE	LOSE	WIN	LOSE	WIN	WIN	WIN	LOSE	LOSE	NOM	OUT				
7	Lorenza	IN	LOSE	LOSE	WIN	BoW	WIN	WIN	WIN	LOSE	LOSE	OUT					
8	Gianluca	IN	LOSE	WIN	NOM	LOSE	NOM	LOSE	LOSE	LOSE	OUT						
9	Lillo	IN	LOSE	WIN	LOSE	BoW	LOSE	LOSE	OUT								
10	Tommaso						IMM	OUT									
11	Andrea	IN	NOM	WIN	LOSE	NOM	OUT										
12	Amelia	NOM	LOSE	NOM	WIN	OUT											
13	Simone	NOM	LOSE	WIN	OUT												
14	Sara	IN	LOSE	OUT													
15	Lorena	IN	OUT														
16	Barbara	OUT															
16	Rosario	OUT															

Color key
Chef was eliminated after nomination
Chef was eliminated after nomination by Cracco
Chef was eliminated without nomination
Chef was eliminated after a challenge, not after the service
Chef wasn't in competition
Chef was retained after nomination
Chef was retained after nomination by Cracco
Chef was the best of the worst/best
The winner of Hell's Kitchen
The runner-up of Hell's Kitchen

== Season 2 ==
=== Contestants ===
Contestant	Age	Occupation	Hometown
Carlotta Pometti	29	Cook	Siena, Tuscany
Chang Liu	27	Assistant cook	Udine, Friuli-Venezia Giulia
Chiara Pannozzo	20	Assistant cook	Latina, Lazio
Davide Guidara	21	Cook	San Salvatore Telesino, Campania
Eleonora Ricci	29	Cook	Ciampino, Lazio
Francesca Narcisi	27	Cook	Rose, Calabria
Giordano Davide	25	Chef de Partie	Naples, Campania
Giovanni Milazzo	25	Cook	Milazzo, Sicily
Giuseppe Muscia	34	Cook	Priolo Gargallo, Sicily
Jessica Gurrera	32	Chef owner	Poggio Berni, Emilia-Romagna
Katiuscia Giorgio	35	Chef owner	Collegno, Piedmont
Luca Magon	23	Commis	Como, Lombardy
Marcella Tagliaferri	32	Cook	Ischia, Campania
Maria Rosaria Cassese	39	Cook	Follonica, Tuscany
Mirko Ronzoni	24	Chef pret a porter	Dalmine, Lombardy
Oliver Malmsten	28	Cook	Seggiano, Tuscany
Vincenzina Capone	30	Cook	Boscotrecase, Campania

=== Contestant progress ===
		Original teams									Switched teams			Individual			Final
No.	Chef	201	202	203	204	205	206	207	208	209	210	211	212	213	214	215	216
1	Mirko	IN	LOSE	LOSE	BoW	LOSE	WIN	WIN	LOSE	LOSE	IMM	LOSE	LOSE	IN	IN	IN	WINNER
2	Chiara	IN	LOSE	LOSE	WIN	LOSE	LOSE	NOM	LOSE	NOM	WIN	WIN	LOSE	IN	IN	IN	RUNNER-UP
3	Eleonora	IN	LOSE	LOSE	WIN	LOSE	NOM	NOM	IMM	LOSE	WIN	WIN	IMM	IN	NOM	IN	THIRD
4	Chang	IN	LOSE	NOM	LOSE	LOSE	IMM	WIN	LOSE	NOM	WIN	NOM	LOSE	IN	IN	OUT	
5	Vincenzina	IN	LOSE	NOM	WIN	LOSE	LOSE	BoW	NOM	LOSE	WIN	WIN	LOSE	IN	OUT		
6	Giordano	IN	LOSE	LOSE	LOSE	NOM	WIN	WIN	LOSE	LOSE	WIN	NOM	OUT				
7	Marcella	IN	LOSE	LOSE	WIN	NOM	NOM	LOSE	NOM	NOM	WIN	OUT					
8	Giovanni	IN	NOM	NOM	LOSE	LOSE	WIN	WIN	NOM	NOM	OUT						
9	Oliver	IN	LOSE	LOSE	LOSE	LOSE	WIN	WIN	OUT								
10	Carlotta	IN	LOSE	LOSE	WIN	NOM	LOSE	OUT									
11	Francesca			LOSE	IMM	LOSE	OUT										
12	Giuseppe	NOM	NOM	LOSE	NOM	OUT											
13	Davide	IN	LOSE	LOSE	OUT												
14	Jessica	IN	NOM	OUT													
15	Katiuscia	NOM	OUT														
16	Luca	OUT															
17	Maria Rosaria	LEFT															

Color key
Chef was eliminated after nomination
Chef was eliminated after nomination by Cracco
Chef was eliminated without nomination
Chef was eliminated after a challenge, not after the service
Chef was eliminated by Cracco during service
Chef wasn't in competition
Chef was retained after nomination
Chef was retained after nomination by Cracco
Chef voluntarily left the competition
Chef was the best of the worst/best
The winner of Hell's Kitchen
The runner-up of Hell's Kitchen

== Season 3 ==
=== Contestants ===
Contestant	Age	Hometown
Carlotta Delicato	21	Piedimonte San Germano
Guglielmo Romani	53	Cavalese
Kristian Simoni	22	Asti
Amalia Nichetti	41	Lodi
Shaban Muhameti	19	Motta di Livenza
Giulio Sorrentino	36	Palermo
Aniello Impagliazzo	26	Ischia
Flavia Rosato	28	Naples
Luca Zuntini	30	San Giovanni in Persiceto
Paola Fiorentino	42	Positano
Roberta Virgilio	36	Dalmine
Cinzia Tomassi	39	Rome
Giulio "Paolo" Paolini	23	Pistoia
Antonio La Cava	19	Rome
Francesca Laici	23	Rome
Consuelo Scaglia	29	Turin

=== Contestant progress ===
		Original teams		First switch		Second switch		Third switch		Fourth switch			Fifth switch	Individual			Final
No.	Chef	301	302	303	304	305	306	307	308	309	310	311	312	313	314	315	316
1	Carlotta	IN	LOSE	WIN	LOSE	LOSE	WIN	WIN	IMM	WIN	IMM	WIN	WIN	IN	IN	IN	WINNER
2	Guglielmo	IN	WIN	LOSE	LOSE	NOM	WIN	WIN	NOM	WIN	IMM	WIN	IMM	IN	IN	IN	RUNNER-UP
3	Kristian	IN	WIN	WIN	BoW	LOSE	LOSE	LOSE	WIN	LOSE	IMM	NOM	WIN	NOM	NOM	IN	THIRD
4	Amalia	IN	LOSE	WIN	LOSE	BoW	NOM	LOSE	WIN	NOM	IMM	LOSE	WIN	NOM	IN	OUT	
5	Shaban	IN	WIN	LOSE	LOSE	NOM	WIN	WIN	LOSE	WIN	IMM	WIN	WIN	IN	OUT		
6	Giulio	NOM	WIN	NOM	IMM	BoW	WIN	WIN	LOSE	WIN	NOM	WIN	OUT				
7	Aniello	IN	WIN	LOSE	LOSE	LOSE	WIN	LOSE	WIN	NOM	IMM	OUT					
8	Flavia	IN	LOSE	WIN	BoW	LOSE	LOSE	NOM	WIN	LOSE	OUT						
9	Luca	IN	WIN	LOSE	LOSE	LOSE	WIN	WIN	NOM	OUT							
10	Paola	NOM	NOM	WIN	LOSE	NOM	IMM	OUT									
11	Roberta	IN	IMM	WIN	LOSE	LOSE	OUT										
12	Cinzia	IN	NOM	WIN	NOM	OUT											
13	Paolo	IN	WIN	LOSE	OUT												
14	Antonio	IN	WIN	OUT													
15	Francesca	IN	OUT														
16	Consuelo	OUT															

Color key
Chef was eliminated after nomination
Chef was eliminated after nomination by Cracco
Chef was eliminated without nomination
Chef was eliminated after a challenge, not after the service
Chef wasn't in competition
Chef was retained after nomination
Chef was retained after nomination by Cracco
Chef was the best of the worst/best
The winner of Hell's Kitchen
The runner-up of Hell's Kitchen

== Season 4 ==
=== Contestants ===
Contestant	Age	Hometown
Mohamed Lamnaour	31	Oulad M'Rah
Erika Ciaccia	28	Mesagne
Tommaso Olivieri	25	Atessa
Andrea De Carlo	27	Maglie
Lorenzo Tirabassi	23	Correggio
Natascha Noia	28	Udine
Enza Crucinio	37	Policoro
Margherita Olivieri	37	Genoa
Monica Zamuner	49	Milan
Andrea "André" Alessandrelli	23	Ancona
Luiz Ferreira	21	Porto Seguro
Federica Liuzzi	23	Torremaggiore
Marta Sandini	25	Cittadella
Ivan Artistico	26	Colleferro

=== Contestant progress ===
		Original teams				Switched teams						Black Jackets		Individual		Final
No.	Chef	401		402		403		404		405		406		407		408
1	Mohamed	LOSE	LOSE	WIN	LOSE	WIN	LOSE	WIN	NOM	LOSE	LOSE	WIN	WIN	LOSE	NOM	WINNER
2	Erika	WIN	LOSE	LOSE	LOSE	LOSE	WIN	LOSE	LOSE	WIN	WIN	LOSE	LOSE	WIN	WIN	RUNNER-UP
3	Tommaso	LOSE	NOM	WIN	LOSE	WIN	LOSE	WIN	NOM	LOSE	LOSE	WIN	WIN	WIN	WIN	THIRD
4	Andrea	LOSE	LOSE	WIN	LOSE	WIN	WIN	LOSE	LOSE	WIN	WIN	LOSE	WIN	LOSE	OUT	
5	Lorenzo	LOSE	LOSE	WIN	LOSE	WIN	NOM	WIN	LOSE	LOSE	NOM	WIN	WIN	LOSE	LEFT	
6	Natascha	WIN	LOSE	LOSE	LOSE	LOSE	WIN	LOSE	LOSE	WIN	WIN	LOSE	OUT			
7	Enza	WIN	LOSE	LOSE	LOSE	LOSE	WIN	LOSE	LOSE	WIN	WIN	OUT				
8	Margherita	WIN	NOM	LOSE	LOSE	LOSE	WIN	WIN	LOSE	LOSE	OUT					
9	Monica	WIN	LOSE	LOSE	LOSE	LOSE	WIN	LOSE	OUT							
10	André	LOSE	NOM	WIN	LOSE	WIN	OUT									
10	Luiz	LOSE	LOSE	WIN	NOM	WIN	OUT									
12	Federica	WIN	NOM	LOSE	LOSE	OUT										
13	Marta	WIN	LOSE	LOSE	OUT											
14	Ivan	LOSE	OUT													

Color key
Chef was eliminated after nomination
Chef was eliminated after nomination by Cracco
Chef was eliminated without nomination
Chef was eliminated after a challenge, not after the service
Chef wasn't in competition
Chef was retained after nomination
Chef was retained after nomination by Cracco
Chef was the best of the worst/best
The winner of Hell's Kitchen
The runner-up of Hell's Kitchen

== Season 5 ==
=== Contestants ===
Contestant	Age	Hometown
Nicola Pepe	22	Legnano
Ginevra Bassetti	28	Fiesole
Michela Truncellitto	32	Rome
Mayla Bucci	26	Ortona
Rodolfo Tagliafierro	39	Rho
Diego Bencetti	34	Brescia
Elena Fotia	28	Rome
Fabrizio Latino	28	Milan
Federica Sana	34	Bergamo
Lory Ignone	30	Cisternino
Luca Siotto	42	Naples
Manuel Porfidio	31	Seregno
Piero Rainone	47	Turin
Federica Gianelli	46	Magenta
Marco Arduini	28	Dubrovnik
Simone Napolitano	22	Rho
Federico Figus	N/A	San Gavino Monreale
Maria Pia Moscatelli	N/A	Fermo
Samantha Fernandez	20	Mendrisio
Clelia Guidotti	26	San Giovanni in Persiceto

=== Contestant progress ===
		Original teams						First switch				Second switch		Black Jackets		Final
No.	Chef	501		502		503		504		505		506		507		508
1	Nicola	IN	WIN	LOSE	LOSE	WIN	LOSE	LOSE	WIN	LOSE	LOSE	WIN	LOSE	WIN	WIN	WINNER
2	Ginevra	IN	LOSE	WIN	WIN	LOSE	WIN	WIN	WIN	WIN	LOSE	LOSE	LOSE	WIN	WIN	RUNNER-UP
3	Michela	IN	LOSE	WIN	WIN	LOSE	WIN	WIN	WIN	LOSE	LOSE	WIN	WIN	LOSE	WIN	FINALIST
3	Mayla	IN	NOM	WIN	WIN	LOSE	WIN	WIN	NOM	WIN	NOM	LOSE	NOM	WIN	NOM	FINALIST
5	Rodolfo	IN	WIN	LOSE	LOSE	WIN	NOM	LOSE	NOM	LOSE	NOM	WIN	WIN	LOSE	OUT	
6	Diego	IN	WIN	LOSE	LOSE	WIN	LOSE	LOSE	WIN	LOSE	LOSE	WIN	WIN	OUT		
7	Elena	IN	LOSE	WIN	WIN	LOSE	WIN	WIN	WIN	WIN	LOSE	LOSE	OUT			
8	Fabrizio	IN	WIN	LOSE	NOM	WIN	NOM	LOSE	NOM	LOSE	OUT					
9	Federica S.	IN	LOSE	WIN	WIN	LOSE	LOSE	WIN	WIN	WIN	OUT					
10	Lory	IN	NOM	WIN	WIN	LOSE	WIN	WIN	OUT							
11	Luca	IN	WIN	LOSE	LOSE	WIN	LOSE	OUT								
12	Manuel	IN	WIN	LOSE	LOSE	WIN	OUT									
13	Piero	IN	WIN	LOSE	OUT											
14	Federica G.	IN	OUT													
15	Marco	OUT														
15	Simone	OUT														
15	Federico	OUT														
15	Maria Pia	OUT														
15	Samantha	OUT														
15	Clelia	OUT														

Color key
Chef was eliminated after nomination
Chef was eliminated after nomination by Cracco
Chef was eliminated without nomination
Chef was eliminated after a challenge, not after the service
Chef wasn't in competition
Chef was retained after nomination
Chef was retained after nomination by Cracco
Chef was the best of the worst/best
The winner of Hell's Kitchen
The runner-up of Hell's Kitchen
