= Tainted Souls =

2017 film

- Directed by: Matteo Botrugno; Daniele Coluccini
- Screenplay by: Matteo Botrugno; Daniele Coluccini; Nuccio Siano
- Starring: Vinicio Marchioni; Anna Foglietta
- Cinematography: Davide Manca
- Edited by: Mario Marrone
- Music by: Paolo Vivaldi
- Release date: 2017
- Language: Italian

Tainted Souls (Italian: Il contagio, lit. 'The contagion') is a 2017 Italian crime drama film co-written and directed by Matteo Botrugno and Daniele Coluccini. It premiered at the 74th Venice International Film Festival.

== Cast ==
- Vinicio Marchioni as Marcello
- Anna Foglietta as Chiara
- Maurizio Tesei as Mauro
- Giulia Bevilacqua as Simona
- Vincenzo Salemme as Walter
- Daniele Parisi as Attilio
- Michele Botrugno as Bruno
- Alessandra Costanzo as Valeria
- Lucianna De Falco as Flaminia
- Nuccio Siano as Carmine
- Carmen Giardina as Lucia
- Flonja Kodheli as Marina
- Fabio Gomiero as Richetto
- Dharma Mangia Woods as Gypsy

== Production ==
The film is loosely based on the novel The Contagion by Walter Siti. It was produced by Notorious Pictures, Gekon Production and Kimerafilm with Rai Cinema.

== Release ==
The film had its world premiere at the 74th edition of the Venice Film Festival, in the Giornate degli Autori sidebar. It was released in Italian cinemas on 28 September 2017.

== Reception ==
Film Threat critic Bobby LePire praised the film, noting:'Despite the issues with the score, Tainted Souls is gripping and compelling. The characters are realistic and relatable, the acting is superb, the directing is sublime, and the screenplay handles its large cast expertly'. For their performances, Vinicio Marchioni and Anna Foglietta were nominated for Nastro d'Argento Awards.
