= Gold Digger (TV series) =

2019 British TV miniseries

- Genre: Romance drama
- Created by: Marnie Dickens
- Written by: Marnie Dickens
- Directed by: Vanessa Caswill; David Evans
- Starring: Julia Ormond; Ben Barnes; Alex Jennings; Jemima Rooper; Sebastian Armesto
- Country of origin: United Kingdom
- Original language: English
- No. of series: 1
- No. of episodes: 6

Production
- Executive producers: Guy de Glanville; Marnie Dickens; Sally Haynes; Elizabeth Kilgarriff; Laura Mackie
- Producer: Ani Kevork
- Cinematography: Jean-Philippe Gossart
- Production company: Mainstreet Pictures

Original release
- Network: BBC One
- Release: 12 November – 17 December 2019

Gold Digger is a six-part drama television miniseries created and written by Marnie Dickens and starring Julia Ormond and Ben Barnes broadcast weekly from Tuesday 12 November 2019 on BBC One. Unusually for a BBC series, all episodes became available on BBC iPlayer on the day of the first episode's television broadcast and the series was broadcast internationally. The series has been described by the BBC as a contemporary relationship thriller, about second chances, family and betrayal.

== Premise ==
After putting her own life behind the lives of everyone around her, a wealthy 60-year-old woman enters into a relationship with a man half her age. Her adult children worry that he's a gold digger.

== Cast and characters ==
- Julia Ormond as Julia Day, a wealthy 60-year-old who falls in love with a younger man.
- Ben Barnes as Benjamin Greene, Julia's 36-year-old boyfriend.
- Alex Jennings as Ted Day, Julia's ex-husband.
- Sebastian Armesto as Patrick Day, the oldest of Julia and Ted's children.
- Yasmine Akram as Eimear Day, Patrick's wife.
- Jemima Rooper as Della Day, Julia and Ted's daughter.
- Archie Renaux as Leo Day, the 25-year-old son of Julia and Ted, who still lives with his mother.
- Nikki Amuka-Bird as Marsha, Julia's former best friend who had an affair with Ted.
- Karla-Simone Spence as Cali Okello, Marsha's daughter, the troubled young adult dealing with the loss of her father.
- Julia McKenzie as Hazel, Ted's mother.
- Indica Watson as Charlotte Day, Patrick's daughter and Julia's granddaughter.
- David Leon as Kieran, Benjamin's half-brother.
- Maeve Dermody as Emily.

== Episodes ==
No.	Title	Directed by	Written by	Original release date	Viewers (millions)
1	"Her Boy"	Vanessa Caswill	Marnie Dickens	12 November 2019	6.85
Julia Day is a wealthy woman and a recent divorcée who ends up spending her 60th birthday alone in London, after her three now grown-up children: Patrick, Della and Leo bail out for various reasons. Spending the afternoon at the British Museum, she meets a young man named Benjamin Greene with whom she instantly becomes smitten. They begin dating and she eventually introduces him to her children, who immediately suspect that he is a gold digger. Meanwhile, Patrick is stressed at both his work and raising his own family. He even tries to resist having an affair with one of his colleagues at work.
2	"Her Daughter"	Vanessa Caswill	Marnie Dickens	19 November 2019	6.01
Patrick, suspicious of Benjamin's intentions, decides to spy on Benjamin with his sister Della. They eventually catch Benjamin in a compromising situation which could potentially end his relationship with Julia. Meanwhile, Della struggles to come on terms with her ex-girlfriend returning to London.
3	"Her Rival"	Vanessa Caswill	Marnie Dickens	26 November 2019	5.99
While visiting Julia at her home in Devon, Benjamin meets her former best friend, Marsha, and learns of Marsha’s affair and current relationship with Julia's ex-husband, Ted. Patrick and Della pay Julia a visit where they show her evidence of Benjamin's infidelity. However, Benjamin clears up the misunderstanding after being confronted by Julia, and their relationship grows stronger. He eventually moves into her home, much to Leo's chagrin. While walking along the cliffs, Benjamin proposes to Julia who accepts.
4	"Her Husband"	David Evans	Marnie Dickens	3 December 2019	6.13
Julia informs Ted of her engagement to Benjamin. Ted retaliates by proposing to Marsha, but she rejects him because of Julia. Meanwhile, Julia announces the engagement to her children during Christmas dinner, but they are immediately against it. Determined to protect their mother's wealth, Patrick persuades Julia to sign a pre-nup. Not wanting to upset Benjamin and worried her children are right about Benjamin, Julia forges Benjamin’s signature. It is also revealed that Julia's relationship with Ted was an abusive one.
5	"Her Baby"	David Evans	Marnie Dickens	10 December 2019	6.19
While celebrating Leo's 25th birthday, Benjamin's half-brother, Kieron, shows up unexpectedly. This threatens Julia and Benjamin's relationship, since Benjamin claimed he was an only child. Believing Benjamin is hiding more than he is letting on, Julia travels to his hometown where she discovers his secret. Meanwhile, Leo befriends Kieron who inspires him to build a business venture, but Julia refuses to invest in it after being influenced by Benjamin. Leo retaliates by leaving her to live with Ted which upsets Julia.
6	"Her Love"	David Evans	Marnie Dickens	17 December 2019	6.36
It's the day of the wedding and Julia is reeling from the revelations of Benjamin's past. She flees from the wedding, but Benjamin eventually finds her. After learning Benjamin's side of the story, Julia faces the ultimate decision that will determine her future.

^α Ratings include pre-transmission.

== Production ==
It was announced in August 2018 that Julia Ormond would be starring in the six part miniseries, commissioned by the BBC. The first three episodes of the series were directed by Vanessa Caswill. Ben Barnes was cast later that month. The supporting cast, including Alex Jennings, Jemima Rooper and Sebastian Armesto, was added as filming began between Devon and London. Filming commenced in September 2018.

== Reception ==
On Rotten Tomatoes, the show holds an approval rating of 57%. The critical consensus reads: "Visually gorgeous and thematically ambitious, but ultimately void of cohesion, Gold Digger bites off more than it can chew."

Lucy Mangan of The Guardian, however called the show "a bold and hugely entertaining attempt by writer Marnie Dickens."

== Adaptations ==
An Italian Netflix adaptation titled Deceitful Love has been announced, starring Giacomo Gianniotti and directed by Pappi Corsicato. Filming began in spring 2023 and its premiere is scheduled for 2024.
