= Make a Wish (2025 film) =

2025 comedy film directed by Volfango De Biasi

- Italian: Esprimi un desiderio
- Directed by: Volfango De Biasi
- Screenplay by: Diego Abatantuono; Max Angioni; Volfango De Biasi; Irene Girotti; Gianluca Belardi; Adriano Ricci
- Produced by: Stefano Bethlen; Corso Codecasa; Attilio De Razza; Guglielmo Marchetti
- Starring: Max Angioni; Diego Abatantuono
- Cinematography: Roberto Forza
- Edited by: Stefano Chierchiè
- Music by: Michele Braga
- Distributed by: Notorious Pictures
- Release date: 25 September 2025 (Italy)
- Running time: 106 minutes
- Country: Italy
- Language: Italian

Make a Wish (Italian: Esprimi un desiderio) is a 2025 Italian comedy film directed by Volfango De Biasi and starring Max Angioni and Diego Abatantuono. It is a remake of the 2022 French comedy film Maison de retraite, directed by Thomas Gilou.

== Cast ==
- Max Angioni as Simone
- Diego Abatantuono as Ettore
- Neva Leoni as Marta
- Nunzia Schiano as Barbara
- Gaetano Bruno as Vinicio
- Elisabetta De Vito as Anna
- Elisabetta De Palo as Cinzia
- Giorgio Colangeli as Ezio
- Hal Yamanouchi as Eisuke
- Nini Salerno as Pino
- Irene Girotti as Maria
- Maria Grazia Cucinotta as Elena
- Marco Messeri as Sigfrido
- Herbert Ballerina as Michele
- Alessio Praticò as Ludovico
- Antonio Gerardi as Dino
- Licia Fertz as Licia
- Elisa Di Eusanio as the judge

== Release ==
The film premiered at the Giffoni Film Festival in July 2025. It was released theatrically in Italy by Notorious Pictures on 25 September 2025.
