= RIP: Roast in Peace =

Italian comedy television show

- Genre: Comedy show
- Directed by: Alessio Pollacci
- Presented by: Michela Giraud
- Country of origin: Italy
- Original language: Italian
- No. of series: 2
- No. of episodes: 12

Production
- Running time: 30 minutes
- Production company: Stand by Me

Original release
- Network: Amazon Prime Video
- Release: 9 October 2025 – present

RIP: Roast in Peace is an Italian comedy television show based on the American celebrity roast format, broadcast by the streaming platform Amazon Prime Video from 9 October 2025. It consists of two seasons. Produced by Stand By Me and hosted by comedian Michela Giraud, it is the first Italian comedy show entirely devoted to roasting.

== Episodes ==
Season	Platform	Release date	Episodes	Contestants	Winner
1	Prime Video	9 October 2025	6	5 (Note: Corrado Nuzzo and Maria Di Biase competed as a duo.)	Stefano Rapone
2	Prime Video	18 September 2026	6	4	Max Angioni

=== Season 1 (2025) ===
The first season consists of six episodes and was released on 9 October 2025. Four episodes were dedicated to individual guests, while the remaining two featured additional content.

First season cast
Roastee	Comedians	Host
Elettra Lamborghini	Beatrice Arnera, Edoardo Ferrario, Corrado Nuzzo and Maria Di Biase, Stefano Rapone, Eleazaro Rossi	Michela Giraud
Selvaggia Lucarelli	Beatrice Arnera, Edoardo Ferrario, Corrado Nuzzo and Maria Di Biase, Stefano Rapone, Eleazaro Rossi	Michela Giraud
Roberto Saviano	Beatrice Arnera, Edoardo Ferrario, Corrado Nuzzo and Maria Di Biase, Stefano Rapone, Eleazaro Rossi	Michela Giraud
Francesco Totti	Beatrice Arnera, Edoardo Ferrario, Corrado Nuzzo and Maria Di Biase, Stefano Rapone, Eleazaro Rossi	Michela Giraud

The season was won by Stefano Rapone, with Nuzzo and Di Biase finishing as runners-up.

=== Season 2 (2026) ===
The second season, also consisting of six episodes, premiered on 18 September 2026. According to Giraud, the second season pushed the boundaries of comedic freedom further than its predecessor.

Second season cast
Roastee	Guest	Comedians	Host
Asia Argento	Anna Lou Castoldi	Max Angioni, Martina Catuzzi, Stefano Rapone, Eleazaro Rossi	Michela Giraud
Alessandro Borghese	Carlo Cracco	Max Angioni, Martina Catuzzi, Stefano Rapone, Eleazaro Rossi	Michela Giraud
Giuseppe Cruciani	David Parenzo	Max Angioni, Martina Catuzzi, Stefano Rapone, Eleazaro Rossi	Michela Giraud
Fedez	Valentina Barbieri	Max Angioni, Martina Catuzzi, Stefano Rapone, Eleazaro Rossi	Michela Giraud
Simona Ventura	Francesca Michielin	Max Angioni, Martina Catuzzi, Stefano Rapone, Eleazaro Rossi	Michela Giraud

The season concluded with a final showdown between the two highest-scoring comedians, in which Max Angioni defeated Rossi and won the title.
