= Marta Filippi =

Italian actress, comedian and voice actress (born 1993)

- Filippi in 2024
- Born: 30 November 1993 (age 32); Rome, Italy
- Occupations: Actress; comedian; voice actress
- Years active: 2018–present

Marta Filippi (born 30 November 1993) is an Italian actress, comedian and voice actress. She gained recognition for her comedy sketches on social media and her participation in the third season of the Amazon Prime Video comedy show LOL - Chi ride è fuori in 2023. She starred in the 2024 romantic comedy film Mascarpone: The Rainbow Cake and plays Virginia Antonelli in the seventh season of television series I Cesaroni (2026).

As a voice actress, she is known for voicing Sabrina Spellman, played by Kiernan Shipka, in the Italian dub of the Netflix series Chilling Adventures of Sabrina. Her animation voice credits include Envy in Pixar's Inside Out 2 and Margo in Despicable Me 4. She also voiced Lucy MacLean, played by Ella Purnell, in the Italian dub of Fallout, as well as characters in The Owl House, Kakegurui and Solo Leveling.

== Filmography ==
Film
Year	Title	Role	Notes
2023	N.E.E.T.		
2024	Mascarpone: The Rainbow Cake	Jamila	
2025	Treelude	Mother Nature	Short film (voice role)

Television
Year	Title	Role	Notes
2023	Ritoccati	Marta	9 episodes
2025	Overacting		Episode "Una spalla su cui piangere"
2026	I Cesaroni	Virginia Antonelli	Main role (season 7)

== Television ==
- Bar Stella (2021–2022)
- LOL - Chi ride è fuori (2023) – contestant
- Prova prova sa sa (2023) – contestant
