= Il malloppo =

2026 comedy film directed by Volfango De Biasi

- Directed by: Volfango De Biasi
- Screenplay by: Volfango De Biasi; Herbert Simone Paragnani; Gianluca Belardi; Irene Girotti
- Story by: Valerio Burli; Emanuele Mochi
- Produced by: Attilio De Razza; Nicola Picone; Guglielmo Marchetti; Corso Codecasa
- Starring: Diego Abatantuono; Michele Foresta; Max Angioni
- Cinematography: Roberto Forza
- Edited by: Stefano Chierchiè
- Music by: Michele Braga
- Production companies: Tramp Limited; Notorious Pictures; Vision Distribution
- Distributed by: Vision Distribution
- Release date: 3 September 2026 (Italy)
- Running time: 110 minutes
- Country: Italy
- Language: Italian

Il malloppo is a 2026 Italian comedy film directed by Volfango De Biasi, starring Diego Abatantuono, Michele Foresta and Max Angioni. The film follows a former bank robber who becomes the prime suspect in a murder connected to a long-missing gold heist.

== Cast ==
- Diego Abatantuono as Diego Viani
- Michele Foresta as Michele Ragusa
- Max Angioni as Alex
- Antonio Catania as Commissioner Castrone
- Irene Girotti as Sara Viani
- Maria Amelia Monti as Lorena
- Bebo Storti as Veleno
- Filippo Pizzocri as young Veleno
- Paola Sambo as Gianna
- Lorenzo Renzi as Faustino
- Maria Chiara Cavallina as Giada

== Production ==
The film was produced by Tramp Limited and Notorious Pictures, in collaboration with Vision Distribution, and received support from the Emilia-Romagna Film Commission. Filming began in Rome in February 2026 and continued in Emilia-Romagna, particularly in Ferrara, Tresignana and Galliera.

== Release ==
The film was released theatrically in Italy by Vision Distribution on 3 September 2026.
