= Giancarlo Commare =

Italian actor (born 1991)

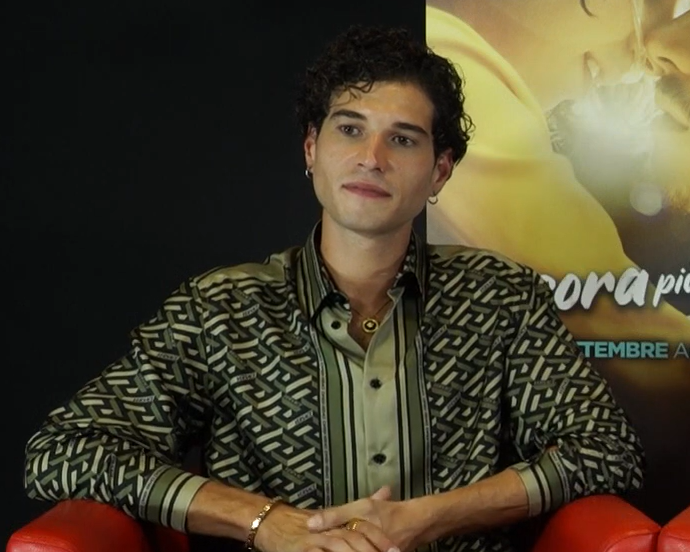
- Commare in 2021
- Born: 29 December 1991 (age 34); Castelvetrano, Sicily, Italy
- Education: Accademia Nazionale di Arte Drammatica Silvio D'Amico
- Occupation: Actor
- Years active: 2014–present

Giancarlo Commare (born 29 December 1991) is an Italian actor. He is best known for his role as Edoardo Incanti in the teen drama television series Skam Italia (2018–2022).

== Biography ==
Commare was born in Castelvetrano, Trapani, Sicily. His parents separated when he was 10 years old, and he has a strained relationship with his father. At the age of 11, he enrolled in contemporary dance classes, citing a disinterest in sports. He realized he wanted to be a professional actor while acting in a church play. After high school, he attended the Accademia Nazionale di Arte Drammatica Silvio D'Amico in Rome.

In 2023, he was a guest speaker at the Riviera International Film Festival.

== Acting credits ==
=== Film ===
Year	Title	Role	Notes	Ref.
2020	The Beast	Boy at disco		
2021	Mascarpone	Antonio		
2021	Blackout Love	Giulio		
2021	Still Out of My League	Gabriele		
2022	Forever Out of My League	Gabriele		
2022	La bambola di pezza	Tommaso	Short film	
2023	Eravamo bambini	Peppino		
2023	Nuovo Olimpo	Ernesto		
2024	Mascarpone: The Rainbow Cake	Antonio		
2024	Eternal Visionary	Stefano Pirandello		

=== Television ===
Year	Title	Role	Notes	Ref.
2014	Che Dio ci aiuti	Boy #2	Episode: "Il senso del limite"	
2015	Provaci ancora prof!	Niccolò Peretti	Main role (season 6)	
2016	Don Matteo	Riccardo	Episode: "E tu quanto vali?"	
2017	The Bastards of Pizzofalcone	Nick Foti	Episode: "Gelo"	
2017	Un passo dal cielo	Alessio	Episode: "La tribù degli angeli caduti"	
2017	L'onore e il rispetto	Nuccio	2 episodes	
2018	Cacciatore: The Hunter	Antonio	Episode: "Freaks"	
2018	Il capitano Maria	Bruno Calì	Miniseries	
2018–2022	Skam Italia	Edoardo Incanti	Main role (season 3), recurring role (seasons 1–2, 4), guest (season 5)	
2019	L'isola di Pietro	Andrea Campana	5 episodes	
2019–2021	Il paradiso delle signore	Rocco Amato	Series regular	
2020	Vite in fuga	Mario Langella	2 episodes	
2020–2021	Fratelli Caputo	Simone	Main role	
2020–2021	Ritoccàti!	Marco	Main role	
2021	Drag Race Italia	Himself	Guest judge; Episode: "Snatch Game & Fab '80s"	
2022	Rinascere	Manuel	Television film	
2022	Romulus	Atys	2 episodes	
2024	Sul più bello - La serie	Gabriele	6 episodes	
2024	This Is Not Hollywood	Ivano Russo	Main role	
2025	The Traitors Italia	Himself; contestant		

=== Theater ===
Year	Title	Role	Theater	Ref.
2022–2023	Everybody's Talking About Jamie	Jamie New	Teatro Brancaccio	

== Awards and nominations ==
Award	Year	Category	Nominated work	Result	Ref.
Fabrique du Cinéma Awards	2021	Best Actor	Mascarpone	Won	
Iris Prize	2022	Best Actor	Mascarpone	Won	
Monte-Carlo Film Festival de la Comédie	2022	Next Generation Comedy Award	Still Out of My League	Won	
