= Permette? Alberto Sordi =

- Film poster
- Directed by: Luca Manfredi
- Produced by: Rai Fiction, Ocean Productions
- Starring: Edoardo Pesce; Francesco Foti; Lillo Petrolo; Alberto Paradossi
- Release date: March 24, 2020
- Running time: 100 minutes
- Country: Italy
- Language: Italian

Permette? Alberto Sordi (lit. 'Pardon? Alberto Sordi') is a 2020 Italian film directed by Luca Manfredi. The film narrates the twenty years of Alberto Sordi's life, from 1937 to 1957, from his beginnings to his celebrity, retracing his friendships, loves and his career; the film is one of the initiatives planned for the centenary of the birth of the Roman actor.

== Plot ==
Alberto Sordi is dismissed from the hotel in Milan where he works as a bailiff because, according to the director, he disturbed Vittorio De Sica and arrived several times late. Some time later, he is expelled from the Accademia dei Filodrammatici because of his strong Roman accent and therefore returns to Rome

He finds work as an extra in Cinecittà, appearing in the film Scipio Africanus (1937) in the role of a Roman soldier. Then he is in charge of dubbing Oliver Hardy, the duo of actors Laurel and Hardy. He makes his theater debut with Aldo Fabrizi and begins to work in variety and for radio whilst also being noticed by De Sica in his first absolute protagonist film, Mamma mia, che impressione! (1951).

During these years, Sordi becomes a friend of another young beginner, Federico Fellini, who will mark the beginning of his celebrity. He romances for the beautiful Jole, tailor at Cinecittà, and also has a relationship with Andreina Pagnani, fifteen years older. Sordi faces the death of his parents and will remain particularly afflicted by the loss of his dear mother.

== Cast ==
- Edoardo Pesce as Alberto Sordi
- Pia Lanciotti as Andreina Pagnani
- Alberto Paradossi as Federico Fellini
- Paola Tiziana Cruciani as Maria Righetti Sordi
- Luisa Ricci as Savina Sordi
- Michela Giraud as Aurelia Sordi
- Paolo Giangrasso as Giuseppe Sordi
- Giorgio Colangeli as Pietro Sordi
- Martina Galletta as Giulietta Masina
- Francesco Foti as Vittorio De Sica
- Sara Cardinaletti as Jole
- Lillo Petrolo as Aldo Fabrizi
- Massimo Wertmüller

== Distribution ==
The film was distributed as a special event in Italian cinemas on 24, 25 and 26 February 2020 only and was broadcast in prime time on Rai Uno on 24 March 2020.

== Critics ==
Sordi's cousin, Igor Righetti, criticizes the film in all its aspects, declaring to Corriere della Sera:

That of Edoardo Pesce is a failed imitation: a nose prosthesis and ape the Roman slang are not enough to become Alberto Sordi. Pesce doesn't pierce the video, at best it scratches it. We family members are all disappointed, too bad: it was a missed opportunity. Meanwhile, the film was presented with the idea of showing an unpublished and unknown Sordi, but there's nothing new, nothing you can't find on Wikipedia. And then there are many inaccuracies, slanders and wickedness. I, who knew Sordi, don't recognize him: throughout the film, he is portrayed like a beaten dog. His deep religiosity is completely absent: he was a devout Catholic, in his room he had a prie-dieu where he prayed every day, in the garden he had a statue of the Virgin. You cannot ignore such an important aspect of his life. This is why I wonder how not to have asked the family members. Or, if not us, at least the fan clubs who really know everything about Sordi.
