= The Price of Family =

2022 Italian comedy film

- Italian: Natale a tutti i costi
- Directed by: Giovanni Bognetti
- Written by: Alexandra Leclère (story); Giovanni Bognetti
- Produced by: Iginio Straffi; Alessandro Usai
- Starring: Christian De Sica; Angela Finocchiaro; Dharma Mangia Woods; Claudio Colica
- Cinematography: Federico Masiero
- Edited by: Walter Marocchi
- Music by: Teho Teardo
- Production companies: Colorado Film, Sony Pictures International Productions
- Distributed by: Netflix
- Release date: 19 December 2022
- Country: Italy
- Language: Italian

The Price of Family (Italian: Natale a tutti i costi) is a 2022 Italian comedy film directed by Giovanni Bognetti, starring Christian De Sica, Angela Finocchiaro, Dharma Mangia Woods, and Claudio Colica.

The film is a remake of the 2021 French film Price of Parenting, directed by Alexandra Leclère. A sequel, The Price of Nonna's Inheritance, was released in 2024.

== Plot ==
After twenty-five years, the Delle Fave family splits up: the children, Alessandra and Emilio, leave the small town and move to the city, leaving their parents, Carlo and Anna, behind. Within a few months, the kids, caught up in their new lives, limit their contact with their parents, not even attending old aunt Tea's funeral. Moreover, Alessandra doesn't show up for her birthday celebration at the family home. The parents visit the city unannounced, only to be poorly received by their children, who inform them that they will not be coming home for Christmas.

Annoyed and frustrated by their attitude, Carlo and Anna decide to lie, pretending to have inherited six million euros from aunt Tea just to get their children back. Attracted by the possibility of getting a share of the inheritance, the children start to reconnect with their parents. Carlo and Anna begin giving them expensive gifts and giving the impression that they can afford a luxurious life, but this brings their bank account close to bankruptcy. After a few days, Carlo goes back to Emilio to tell him the truth, while Anna does the same with Alessandra. Despite their intentions, Carlo ends up promising Emilio a substantial amount of money to get back on his feet and change job. Meanwhile, Anna brings her daughter back home after she was left by her partner Rocco. Alessandra asks her parents for funding to start her own business, which they reluctantly agree to.

Without financial support from their bank, Anna lies about Carlo having a rare disease, the treatment for which requires expensive trips and stays in private facilities between France and the United States. The children decide to renounce collecting their inheritance shares, opting to stay close to their father during his treatment. The parents pretend to leave for Paris for an important medical appointment through a video call, but Emilio uncovers the truth when he finds them at home. The parents admit their lies. The relationship with their children breaks down drastically, and they seek comfort from their grandmother Giuliana, who makes the two young people reflect on their selfish attitude. They also discover that the grandmother had indeed inherited, without anyone knowing, a large sum of money from aunt Tea. Eventually, the family reunites.

== Cast ==
- Christian De Sica as Carlo Delle Fave
- Angela Finocchiaro as Anna Delle Fave
- Dharma Mangia Woods as Alessandra Delle Fave
- Claudio Colica as Emilio Delle Fave
- Fioretta Mari as Giuliana
- Alessandro Betti as Azeglio De Frescobaldi
- Francesco Marioni as Rocco
- Iaia Forte as Loredana
