= Deceitful Love =

2024 Italian television miniseries

- Italian Netflix poster
- Italian: Inganno
- Genre: Romantic drama
- Based on: Gold Digger
- Written by: Teresa Ciabatti; Eleonora Cimpanelli; Flaminia Gressi; Michela Straniero
- Directed by: Pappi Corsicato
- Starring: Monica Guerritore; Giacomo Gianniotti
- Composer: Andrea Guerra
- Country of origin: Italy
- No. of episodes: 6

Production
- Cinematography: Rocco Marra
- Production company: Cattleya

Original release
- Network: Netflix
- Release: 9 October 2024

Deceitful Love (Italian: Inganno, lit. 'Deceit') is a 2024 Italian romantic drama television miniseries directed by Pappi Corsicato, based on the British miniseries Gold Digger. It was released on Netflix on 9 October 2024.

== Cast ==
- Monica Guerritore as Gabriella, a wealthy 60-year-old hotel owner
- Giacomo Gianniotti as Elia
- Emanuel Caserio as Stefano, Gabriella's son
- Dharma Mangia Woods as Giulia, Gabriella's daughter
- Francesco Del Gaudio as Nico, Gabriella's son
- Denise Capezza as Marina
- Fabrizia Sacchi as Delia, Mario's second wife
- Sandra Ceccarelli as Elia's mother
- Geppy Gleijeses as Mario, Gabriella's ex-husband
- Gabriele Stella as Mattia, a police officer and Stefano's lover

== Episodes ==
| No. | Title | Directed by | Written by | Original release date |
|---|---|---|---|---|
| 1 | "Episode 1" | Pappi Corsicato | Unknown | 9 October 2024 |
| 2 | "Episode 2" | Pappi Corsicato | Unknown | 9 October 2024 |
| 3 | "Episode 3" | Pappi Corsicato | Unknown | 9 October 2024 |
| 4 | "Episode 4" | Pappi Corsicato | Unknown | 9 October 2024 |
| 5 | "Episode 5" | Pappi Corsicato | Unknown | 9 October 2024 |
| 6 | "Episode 6" | Pappi Corsicato | Unknown | 9 October 2024 |

== Production ==
Filming began in March 2023, and took place in Positano and Miseno, Naples.

== Release ==
A teaser trailer for the series was released on 25 July 2024. The official trailer was released on 17 September 2024.
