= Max Angioni =

Italian comedian (born 1990)

- Angioni in 2022
- Born: Massimiliano Angioni; 8 November 1990 (age 35); Como, Italy
- Occupations: Comedian, television presenter, actor
- Years active: 2014–present

Massimiliano "Max" Angioni (born 8 November 1990) is an Italian comedian, actor and television presenter. He rose to prominence after finishing second in the eleventh season of Italia's Got Talent in 2021 and later appeared on Zelig, LOL - Chi ride è fuori, Le Iene and Gialappa Show. He made his feature film debut as a leading actor in the comedy film Make a Wish (2025).

== Life and career ==
Angioni was born in Como, Italy, to a family of Sardinian origin and grew up in the city's Sagnino neighbourhood. He studied acting at Teatro in Centro in Como and the Accademia del Comico in Milan, and participated in the Mimetic Fest in London and the Edinburgh Festival Fringe in 2014.

He made his television debut in 2018 on Zelig Time, followed by Zelig C-Lab in 2020. In 2021, he finished second in Italia's Got Talent and joined the cast of Zelig, where he performed as Kevin Scannamanna, an aspiring reality television contestant.

In 2022, Angioni competed in the second season of LOL - Chi ride è fuori and toured Italian theatres with his stand-up comedy show Miracolato, which sold more than 30,000 tickets. A recording of the show was broadcast on Italia 1 in September 2022.

In 2023, he published Mistero brutto. Il Vangelo secondo me, a humorous book about the Gospel, released by Mondadori and presented at the Turin International Book Fair. That year, he became a co-presenter of the television programme Le Iene. In 2024, he returned to the stage with the comedy show Anche meno, produced by Paolo Ruffini.

In 2025, Angioni presented the television show Max Working: Lavori in corso on Italia 1 and made his feature film debut starring in the comedy film Make a Wish by Volfango De Biasi. The following year, he starred in De Biasi's comedy film Il malloppo. In late 2026, he won the second season of the comedy show RIP: Roast in Peace on Prime Video and joined the cast of Gialappa Show on TV8.

== Filmography ==
Film
Year	Title	Role	Notes
2025	Make a Wish	Simone	Film debut
2025	Zootopia 2	Gary De'Snake	Voice role (Italian dub)
2026	Il malloppo	Alex	

Television
Year	Title	Role	Notes
2024	Sono Lillo	Himself	Episode 2

== Television ==
- Zelig Time (2018)
- Zelig C-Lab (2020)
- Italia's Got Talent (2021; contestant)
- Lui è peggio di me (2021)
- Zelig (2021–2023, 2025–2026)
- LOL - Chi ride è fuori (2022; contestant)
- Le Iene (2023–2026; presenter)
- Max Working: Lavori in corso (2025; presenter)
- Zelig On (2025–2026)
- RIP: Roast in Peace (2026; winner)
- Gialappa Show (2026–present)

== Books ==
- Angioni, Max (2023). Mistero brutto. Il Vangelo secondo me. Milan: Mondadori.
