= Mascarpone (2021 film) =

Italian 2021 film

- Italian: Maschile singolare
- Directed by: Matteo Pilati: Alessandro Guida
- Written by: Giuseppe Paternò Raddusa; Matteo Pilati; Alessandro Guida
- Produced by: Matteo Pilati
- Starring: Giancarlo Commare; Eduardo Valdarnini; Gianmarco Saurino; Michela Giraud; Lorenzo Adorni; Barbara Chichiarelli; Carlo Calderone; Vittorio Magazzù
- Cinematography: Michel Franco
- Edited by: Marco Careri
- Music by: Umberto Gaudino; Jean Michel Sneider
- Production company: Rufus Film
- Distributed by: Adler Entertainment (Italy); Vision Distribution (International)
- Release date: 4 June 2021 (Italy)
- Running time: 101 minutes
- Country: Italy
- Language: Italian

Mascarpone (Italian: Maschile singolare, lit. 'Masculine singular') is a 2021 Italian romantic comedy film directed by Alessandro Guida and Matteo Pilati, starring Giancarlo Commare, Eduardo Valdarnini, Gianmarco Saurino, and Michela Giraud. Set in Rome, its narrative follows a man searching for his path in life after a break-up. It is produced by Rufus Film in association with MP Film.

The film was followed by a sequel, Mascarpone: The Rainbow Cake (Maschile plurale), in 2024.

== Plot ==
Antonio's life finds an unexpected twist when he is suddenly dumped by his husband, on whom he depends both psychologically and economically. With the support of his best friend, Cristina, Antonio needs to find a new place to stay, a job and a new purpose in life.

He finds a room in an apartment owned by Denis, who is basically his complete opposite and lives a carefree – yet ultimately lonely – life, and he starts to work in a bakery owned by the mysterious and fascinating Luca, a friend of Denis'. Antonio, who has always been interested in pastry-making, also starts to attend a pastry school, where he finds a teacher who is very strict with him and pushes him to achieve the best results.

Thanks to Denis and Luca, Antonio discovers that being single can be nice as well and that it was wrong of him to give up his independence and rely on his husband for everything in life for the sake of their relationship. But when Antonio falls in love with Thomas, a charming photographer from Milan, it seems like he is about to repeat the same mistakes he made in the past.

== Cast ==
- Giancarlo Commare as Antonio
- Eduardo Valdarnini as Denis
- Gianmarco Saurino as Luca
- Michela Giraud as Cristina
- Barbara Chichiarelli as Orsola
- Vittorio Magazzù as Eugenio
- Lorenzo Adorni as Thomas
- Carlo Calderone as Lorenzo
- Alberto Paradossi as Paolo
- Manuela Spartà as Maria Vittoria
- Elisabetta De Vito as Irma
- Giorgia Arena as Linda
- Samuele Picchi as Virginio

== Production ==
The film was shot in Rome in three weeks – from 18 January to 8 February 2020 – just two weeks away from the start of the COVID-19 pandemic.

== Release ==
The film was first released in Italy exclusively on Prime Video on 4 June 2021. In 2022, it was released theatrically in other countries, including the United Kingdom, United States, Canada, France, Germany and Poland.

The film was followed by a sequel, Mascarpone: The Rainbow Cake (Maschile plurale), in 2024.

== Reception ==
=== Critical reception ===
On review aggregator Rotten Tomatoes, Mascarpone has an approval rating of 88% based on 8 reviews.

Andrew Stover of Film Threat reviewed the film as "an open, honest, and tender drama that foregrounds the importance of retaining one's independence". On MidnightEast, Ayelet Dekel praises the film for being "sex positive, showing different perspectives on sex, dating, and relationships". Killian Melloy of Edge Media Network praises acting and direction: "A quintet of captivating performances, along with the zippy and emotionally resonant direction, ensure that we in the audience stay invested, and amused." Denis Harvey of 48hills writes that "there's something refreshing about its reversing the usual equation of such movies: rather than true love providing the inevitable narrative solution, here it's suggested Antonio may be better off further exploring his own still-new independence before becoming half of a couple again. This very pleasing movie's debt to Paul Mazursky's 1978 An Unmarried Woman is made explicit when it closes on a replication of that film's final scene."

For Rolling Stone Italia, "the 'gay dramedy' is well written and acted," while for Mymovies.it declared that "the dialogues return a communicative dynamic alien to the straight community but precisely for this reason interesting," despite the fact that the directorial imprint is "rather conventional but never sloppy or approximate." Fabio Vittorini on Duels writes that "the writing avowedly starts from 'types' known to the general Italian public within which it digs to provide them with a peculiar and convincing language, poised between cliché (...) and subtlety, trying in every way to balance Italian-style comedy and U.S. dramedy, coming-of-age novel and sentimental drama." Massimino de Febe of Universal Movies notes that the novelty lies in the avowed homosexuality of the main characters, presented with such simplicity that it does not characterize the film's plot on the thematic strand, but rather makes it more neutral and thus more accessible to a wide audience.

=== Accolades ===
- 2022 – Diversity Media Awards
  - Best Italian Film
- 2021 – Ortigia Film Festival
  - Audience Award
- 2021 – Fabrique Awards
  - Best actor for Giancarlo Commare
  - Nomination for the best first-feature film director for Matteo Pilati e Alessandro Guida
  - Nomination for best actor for Eduardo Valdarnini
- 2021 – OUTShine LGBTQ+ Film Festival
  - Best Feature: Jury Award Runner-Up Fort Lauderdale Edition
- 2021 – Palm Springs LGBTQ Film Festival
  - Festival Favorite Award
  - Director's Choice Award
- 2021 – Chicago LGBTQ+ International Film Festival
  - Best Narrative Feature Audience Award
- 2021 – Way OUT West Film Fest
  - Favorite Narrative Feature
- 2022 – Etna Comics
  - Uzeta Award for best screenplay for Giuseppe Paternò Raddusa, Matteo Pilati and Alessandro Guida
