= The Price of Nonna's Inheritance =

2024 Italian comedy film

- Italian: Ricchi a tutti i costi
- Directed by: Giovanni Bognetti
- Written by: Giovanni Bognetti
- Produced by: Iginio Straffi; Alessandro Usai
- Starring: Christian De Sica; Angela Finocchiaro; Dharma Mangia Woods; Claudio Colica
- Cinematography: Federico Annicchiarico
- Edited by: Walter Marocchi
- Music by: Teho Teardo
- Production company: Colorado Film
- Distributed by: Netflix
- Release date: 4 June 2024
- Country: Italy
- Language: Italian

The Price of Nonna's Inheritance (Italian: Ricchi a tutti i costi) is a 2024 Italian black comedy film written and directed by Giovanni Bognetti, starring Christian De Sica, Angela Finocchiaro, Dharma Mangia Woods, and Claudio Colica.

The film is a sequel of the 2022 film The Price of Family.

== Plot ==
One evening, Anna meets her high school ex, Nunzio, who has a dubious past. After he makes an unwanted advance, Anna rejects him and leaves. A month later, Anna, her husband Carlo, and their children, Alessandra and Emilio, are at a restaurant waiting for grandma Giuliana, who has an announcement. The family thinks it's about Giuliana's famous six-million-euro inheritance. Instead, Giuliana announces her engagement to Nunzio.

Anna is devastated, believing Nunzio is after Giuliana's money and may resort to murder, as his previous wealthy, older wives died suddenly. When Anna warns Giuliana, she is dismissed and learns that Giuliana plans to marry Nunzio in Menorca and move to Brazil. Desperate, Anna plans to kill Nunzio, supported by her family except for Emilio.

Alessandra devises a plan using aconitum, a plant in Menorca that causes death by asphyxiation, simulating a heart attack. The family arrives at the rented villa for the wedding but finds the villa occupied by the caretaker, Luis, and his partner, Patricia. Alessandra hesitates to push Nunzio off a cliff, and Emilio gets accidentally poisoned by aconitum, foiling the plan. Carlo then tries to fake Nunzio's suicide, but the surveillance cameras fail. Days before the wedding, Bojan, a blind Serbian wedding planner and Nunzio's best man, arrives. He overhears the family's plan and blackmails them for 400,000 euros. Anna agrees, and Bojan collaborates with them.

Carlo later suspects Anna of an affair when he sees Nunzio with a woman by the pool. On the eve of the wedding, the family drugs Nunzio with sleeping pills in order to suffocate him with a car exhaust pipe. Emilio and Alessandra back out, but Carlo and Anna proceed. However, the plan fails as the chosen car is electric, lacking an exhaust pipe.

That night, gunshots wake everyone. They find Nunzio wounded, Luis holding a gun, and Patricia crying. It turns out Nunzio had an affair with Patricia, discovered by Luis. With Nunzio hospitalized, Giuliana remains determined to go to Brazil. She plans to treat Nunzio as a servant, renouncing the six million euros and transferring the money to Anna. Despite Anna's dismay, she lets her mother go. Anna keeps the money as a secret, and promises her family a future vacation to reunite them.

== Cast ==
- Christian De Sica as Carlo Delle Fave
- Angela Finocchiaro as Anna Delle Fave
- Dharma Mangia Woods as Alessandra Delle Fave
- Claudio Colica as Emilio Delle Fave
- Fioretta Mari as Giuliana
- Ninni Bruschetta as Nunzio Zampa
- Fernando Albizu as Luis
- Irma Carolina Di Monte as Patricia
- Teresa Piergentili as Marzia
- Darko Perić as Bojan
