= Claudio Colica =

Italian actor and comedian (born 1988)

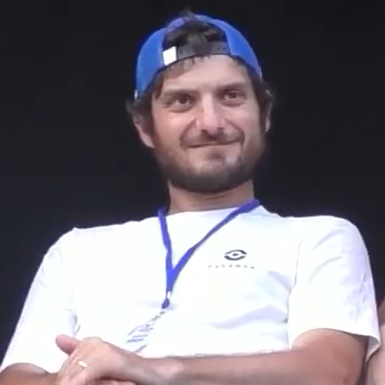
- Colica in 2025
- Born: 5 December 1988 (age 37); Rome, Italy
- Occupations: Actor, screenwriter, comedian
- Years active: 2016–present
- Spouse: Neva Leoni (m. 2022)

Claudio Colica (born 5 December 1988) is an Italian actor, comedian and screenwriter.

== Career ==
Claudio Colica began his career together with his brother Fabrizio, creating the comedy duo Le Coliche ("The colics") and publishing short videos on social media about various everyday topics, pop culture and life in Rome. Their skits went viral and started to gain recognition beyond Rome. In 2016, he was part of the cast of the TV series Vegan Chronicles, and the following year, he appeared in the short film Grosso guaio a Roma Sud.

In 2018, he took part with his brother Fabrizio at the Rai 2 television show Pechino Express, but had to withdraw due to an injury; his brother continued the race with another partner, ultimately finishing in second place. In 2021, the duo published their first autobiographical book, Come il mal di pancia, with illustrations by comic artist Giacomo Bevilacqua.

In 2022, he landed his first leading role, alongside Christian De Sica, Angela Finocchiaro, and Dharma Mangia Woods, in the Netflix comedy The Price of Family, where he played Emilio Delle Fave. Subsequently, he had supporting roles in the films Io e mio fratello by Luca Lucini and Mascarpone: The Rainbow Cake by Alessandro Guida.

In 2024, he reprises the role of Emilio in The Price of Nonna's Inheritance, the sequel to The Price of Family.

== Personal life ==
Colica has revealed that he has Tourette's syndrome. He has been married to actress Neva Leoni since 2022.

== Filmography ==
Film
Year	Title	Role	Notes
2016	Grosso guaio a Roma Sud	Er Kolica	Short film
2018	Amici come prima	Documentary's narrator	Voice only
2020	GG Turbo		
2022	The Price of Family	Emilio Delle Fave	
2023	Io e mio fratello	Alessandro	
2024	Mascarpone: The Rainbow Cake	Pietro	
2024	The Price of Nonna's Inheritance	Emilio Delle Fave	
2024	30 anni di meno	Young Maurizio	
2024	Finché notte non ci separi	Michele	
2025	30 notti con il mio ex	Paolo	

Television
Year	Title	Role	Notes
2016	Vegan Chronicles	Claudio	TV series; 4 episodes (also writer)
2017–2018	Usciamo		TV series (also writer)

== Works ==
- Claudio Colica; Fabrizio Colica (2021). Come il mal di pancia. La storia vera di due fratelli per sbaglio. Milan: Mondadori Electa.
