= Dharma Mangia Woods =

Italian actress (born 1994)

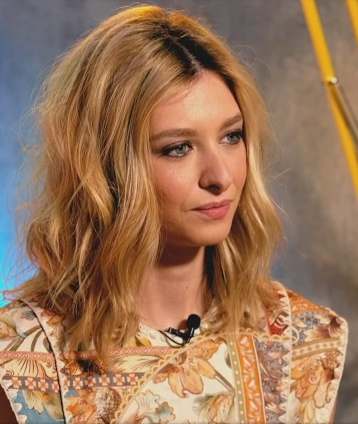
- Mangia Woods in 2023
- Born: 15 September 1994 (age 30); Rome, Italy
- Occupation: Actress
- Years active: 2016–present

Dharma Mangia Woods (born 15 September 1994) is an Italian actress.

== Early life and education ==
Dharma Mangia Woods was born on 15 September 1994, in Rome. She has Italian heritage from her mother and Australian heritage from her father.

After graduating from Dante Alighieri Classical High School in Rome, she enrolled in the Faculty of Communication sciences at Roma Tre University, where she earned her degree. She then pursued a master's in fashion journalism at Edios Communication and took an acting course at Duse International. Mangia Woods completed a bachelor's degree in acting at the International Academy of Theatre in 2018. In 2022, she graduated from the Scuola d'Arte Cinematografica Gian Maria Volontè.

== Career ==
In 2016, Mangia Woods made her film debut in Gabriele Muccino's Summertime. The same year, she appeared in the TV series The Young Pope. In 2017, she acted in the film Tainted Souls directed by Matteo Botrugno and Daniele Coluccini. In 2019, she has a minor role in Abel Ferrara's film Tommaso. In these years, she also appeared in some music videos, including "Martelli" by Gazzelle, and "Mi ci pulisco il cuore" by Luciano Ligabue.

In 2021, Mangia Woods played the role of Stella in the film Blackout Love directed by Francesca Marino. In 2022, she was cast as Costanza Di Giusto in the miniseries Più forti del destino directed by Alexis Sweet, co-starring Giulia Bevilacqua and Laura Chiatti. Additionally, she portrayed Lietta Pirandello in Roberto Andò's film Strangeness and Alessandra Delle Fave in the Netflix comedy film The Price of Family.

In 2023, she has a small role in Walter Veltroni's film Quando. In 2024, she reprised her role as Alessandra Delle Fave from The Price of Family in the sequel The Price of Nonna's Inheritance. She also joined the cast of the Netflix series Deceitful Love directed by Pappi Corsicato.

== Filmography ==
Film
Year	Title	Role	Notes
2016	Summertime	Marco's girlfriend	
2017	Tainted Souls	Gypsy	
2019	Tommaso	Acting class dancer	
2021	Blackout Love	Stella	
2022	L'anima della festa	Vittoria	Short film
2022	Strangeness	Lietta Pirandello	
2022	The Price of Family	Alessandra Delle Fave	
2023	Quando	Francesca	
2023	Catene		
2024	The Price of Nonna's Inheritance	Alessandra Delle Fave	

Television
Year	Title	Role	Notes
2016	The Young Pope		TV series
2022	Più forti del destino	Costanza Di Giusto	TV miniseries; main role
2024	Deceitful Love	Giulia	TV miniseries; main role
2024	Nato il sei ottobre	Paola Curtoni	Documentary

Music videos
Year	Title	Artist(s)	Director(s)
2018	"Colazione a Cortina"	Tutti Fenomeni	Paula Ling Yi Sun
2018	"Ologramma"	Mezzosangue	Marcello Saurino
2018	"Martelli"	Gazzelle	Andrea Losa, Lorenzo Silvestri
2021	"Mi ci pulisco il cuore"	Luciano Ligabue	Davide Vicari
