= Gualtiero Marchesi =

Italian chef (1930–2017)

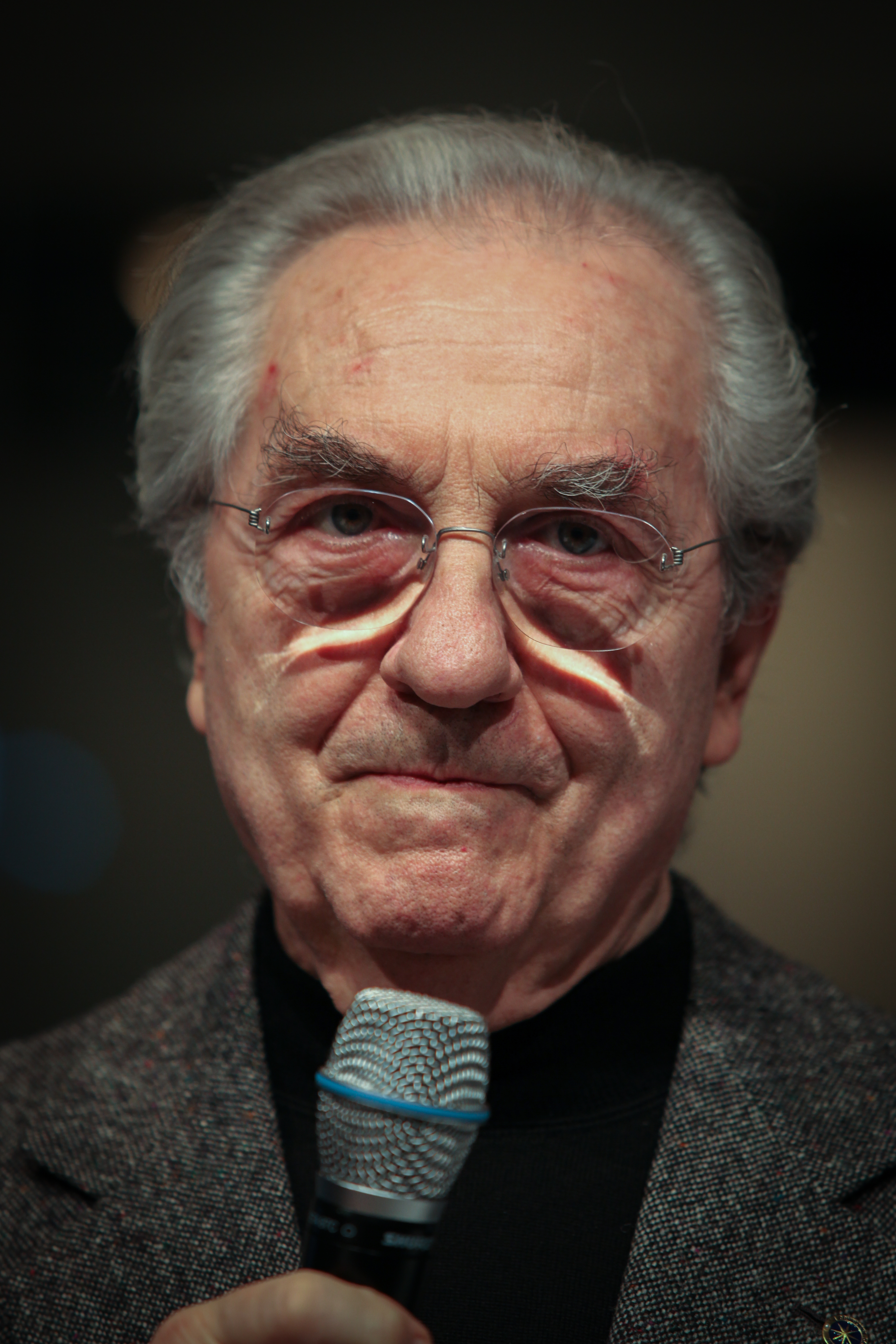
- Marchesi in 2010
- Born: 19 March 1930; Milan, Italy
- Died: 26 December 2017 (aged 87); Milan, Italy
- Website: gualtieromarchesi.it

Gualtiero Marchesi (pronounced [ɡwalˈtjɛːro marˈkeːzi]; 19 March 1930 – 26 December 2017) was an Italian chef, considered the founder of Italian nouvelle cuisine.

== Biography ==
Marchesi was born in Milan, Italy. His parents ran the hotel and restaurant "L'Albergo del Mercato" in Via Bezzecca. It was here that he had his first experiences in the kitchen.

Two of his relatives, Luigi Ghisoni—who had been a chef at the Ritz, Madeira, before he joined Marchesi's father running the business—and Domenico Bergamaschi, chef at Albergo del Mercato, were major influences on Marchesi. He identified their ability to prepare traditional recipes perfectly, but he also acknowledged their talent of enhancing the flavour of simple ingredients.

At 17, he left school to work at the Hotel Kulm in St. Moritz. He then studied at a hotel school in Lucerne before returning to work at Albergo del Mercato. There, he prepared traditional recipes for lunch, but in the evening he was given a free hand to experiment. He built a following for his avant-garde cuisine.

Marchesi was an accomplished musician and follower of music. Through this, he met his wife, a piano soloist and daughter of a famous soprano.

Marchesi then worked at the "Ledoyen" in Paris, "Le Chapeau Rouge" in Dijon, and "Troisgros" in Roanne. On his return to Milan, he opened a small hotel with his parents, which he ran until 1977.

He then opened his first restaurant on Via Bonvesin de la Riva in Milan, also in 1977. Within a year, he earned his first Michelin star, with another following the next year. It took another seven years, but he eventually won the distinction of a third Michelin star—the first Italian chef, and possibly even the first non-French chef, to do so, although citations on the latter are difficult to confirm.

In September 1993, Marchesi moved out of Milan to the Franciacorta region, between Bergamo and Brescia. He opened the Ristorante di Erbusco in the Albereta Hotel, where his vision of global cuisine took root and flourished.

His restaurant Gualtiero Marchesi di San Pietro all'Orto, in Milan, opened in 1998 and is a mix of traditional cooking and modern technology. It is also a cooking academy.

He opened a restaurant in Paris in 2001. In January 2001, he took over Hostaria dell’Orso, the oldest restaurant in Rome, located in a building dating back to 1400 AD.

In 2011, Marchesi became the first celebrity chef to design two hamburgers and a dessert for McDonald's.

In 2014, Marchesi took part in the documentary film 29200 Puthod, l'altra verità della realtà directed by Federico Angi; it is a biography of Dolores Puthod, an internationally recognized painter.

In May 2017, Marchesi and Director Maurizio Gigola presented the documentary film Marchesi: The Great Italian at the Cannes Film Festival.

He received the America Award of the Italy–USA Foundation in 2017.

== Honours ==
- 1986 Ambrogino d'Oro
- 1989 Personnalité de l’année for gastronomy
- 1990 Chevalier des Arts et des Lettres
- 1991 Commendatore della Repubblica
- 1999 Longobardo d'Oro

Grand Prix 'Memoire et Gratitude', awarded by the International Academy of Gastronomy.

He was one of the founders of Euro-Toques, an association of some 3,000 of the world's most important chefs, and was its international president (2000–2002).

As the University Rector of ALMA, which offers the first international master's degree in Italian cuisine, Marchesi hoped to improve Italian catering and restaurant management.

In June 2008, Marchesi denounced the scoring system of Michelin, and "returned" the stars, challenging the voting system of the guide, and claiming to only want to receive comments and ratings. As a result, the 2009 edition "disappears" the Marchesi restaurant from the Michelin guide:

"What makes me indignant is that we Italians are still so naive as to entrust the success of our restaurants – despite the great strides that the industry has made – to a French guide, that last year, as usual, assigned the highest score to just five Italian restaurants, compared to 26 French. If this isn't a scandal, what is it? ... When, in June, I became polemical with Michelin I did it to set an example, to alert young people to help them understand that the passion for cooking cannot be subject to a vote. I know for certain, however, that many of them sacrifice themselves and work themselves to exhaustion in order to gain a Michelin star. It is neither healthy nor fair."

— Gualtiero Marchesi, November 2008

- 2012 Laurea Honoris Causa in Gastronomy Science from the Universitas of Parma
