= Paolo Cuccia =

Italian businessman

- Born: 1953 (age 72–73); Roma
- Occupation: dirigente d'azienda

Paolo Cuccia is an Italian businessman.

Cuccia served as president of Gambero Rosso, president of Artribune S.r.l., member of the board of Astaldi and member of the board of Techedge.

== Education ==
- Liceo Classico Massimo Padri Gesuiti in Rome (1972)
- Università la Sapienza in Rome – Master in Engineering (1977)
- Università Bocconi in Milan – Master in Business Administration (1980)

== Career ==
He began his career at IRI Italstat in 1978. He then worked at various Citibank units. In 1988 he was founder and CEO of Europa Investimenti S.A.P.A. In 1998 he became CEO of Acea. Thereafter he served and/or chaired various boards of directors. He was the vice-president of Capitalia.

== Other roles ==
He worked as a professor of Project Finance at Libera Università Internazionale degli Studi Sociali Guido Carli, and worked with Fondazione Centesimus Annus Pro Pontifice.

== Recognition ==
- Università Bocconi – Master of Masters (2007)
- Università LUISS Guido Carli Luiss Master –Honoris causa in Hospitality (2009)
- Guido Carli Award (2011)
