= Gambero Rosso =

Italian publishing group and food and wine magazine

- Cover of issue 394
- Parent company: Gambero Rosso
- Founded: 1986
- Country of origin: Italy
- Headquarters location: Rome
- Key people: Paolo Cuccia
- Publication types: Book, tv channel, magazine
- Official website: www.gamberorosso.it

Gambero Rosso is an Italian food and wine magazine and publishing group founded in 1986. Its name literally translates as 'red prawn' and comes from a tavern in Pinocchio where the Fox and the Cat dine.

== History ==
Gambero Rosso was initially an eight-page supplement of il manifesto, first published on 16 December 1986, and was founded by Stefano Bonilli. It contributed early to spreading the views of "ARCI Gola", which was a forerunner to the Slow Food movement.

From 1987, Gambero Rosso has published a guide to Italian wine, titled Vini d'Italia, which in a short time became the most influential within Italy. It is also published in English translation under the title Italian Wines. From the 2010 edition, the guide is published without the participation of the Slow Food movement, following controversy over the removal of founder Stefano Bonilli from his position.

From 1990, a guide to Italian restaurants was published.

In 1992, Gambero Rosso was issued by Gruppo Editoriale L'Espresso as a monthly magazine.

In 1999, a TV channel, Gambero Rosso Channel, was started in cooperation with RaiSat. From July 2009 Gambero Rosso Channel is broadcast by Sky Italia, channel 411.

In 2002, Gambero Rosso's Città del gusto ("City of taste") was opened in Rome, featuring TV studios, cooking school, wine bar and professional and educational activities on 10,000 square meters. In Italy there are 4 different 'Città del gusto': Rome, Naples, Catania and Palermo. From 2009 Paolo Cuccia became the Chairman of Gambero Rosso Holding Spa.

From 2012 Gambero Rosso publishes digital versions of its guides: Vini d'Italia and Ristoranti d'Italia. Apps are available for: Apple iPhone, Samsung Apps, Google Play, Amazon Appstore and Windows 8.

== Wine ratings ==
The Gambero Rosso wine ratings in Vini d’Italia are built up on the number of glasses (bicchieri) awarded to a wine, which is indicated in the wine guide with a number of stylized glasses next to the wine's name. The highest rating is three glasses (Tre Bicchieri), and the wine guide only includes wines which are seen by the editors as "above average". The ratings are based upon blind tasting by independent experts. The guide is edited in Italian, English and German languages.

- Three glasses indicate "extraordinary wines".
- Two red glasses indicates a wine which was selected as a candidate for three glasses (which far from all wines with two glasses are), but did not make it all the way. This feature was introduced in the 2002 edition.
- Two glasses indicate "very good wines".
- One glass indicates "good wines".

== Ristoranti d'Italia ==
The guide Ristoranti d'Italia (23rd edition in 2013) describes the best Italian restaurants. For each place it attributes a rating from 60 to 100 and, only for the best restaurants, a number of forchette ('forks') ranging from 1 to 3. In 2013, among 2015 reviewed restaurants, 21 places obtained Tre Forchette (three forks), the highest prize. By 2025, the number of tre forchette had increased to 52.
