= Comedy Central (Italy) =

- Country: Italy
- Broadcast area: Italy, San Marino, Vatican City

Programming
- Language: Italian
- Picture format: 1080i (16:9 HDTV)
- Timeshift service: Comedy Central +1 (2009-2025)

Ownership
- Owner: Paramount Networks EMEAA
- Sister channels: MTV; Nickelodeon

History
- Launched: 1 December 2004; 1 August 2009 (+1)
- Closed: 1 December 2025 (Comedy Central +1 only)
- Former names: Paramount Comedy (1 December 2004 – 29 April 2007)

Links
- Website: comedycentral.it

Availability

Streaming media
- Now: Comedy Central

Comedy Central is an Italian television channel broadcasting comedy-related programmes from the United States, the United Kingdom and Italy. It is owned by Paramount Networks EMEAA.

== History ==
Paramount Comedy launched in Italy on 1 December 2004, originally broadcasting from 8pm to 6am, timesharing with Nickelodeon. Since 12 June 2006 Paramount Comedy has been broadcasting 24 hours a day. The network broadcast programming dedicated to comedic entertainment based on TV series, cartoons, original programs and cabaret.

While Paramount Comedy's communications activities focused on the launch of the channel itself, towards the end of 2006, with an annual investment of 2 million euros, they concentrated on its content. Around the same time, Paramount Comedy reached two deals with Warner Bros. and CBS Paramount. With the new schedule, the investment in original productions (mostly cabaret) was 30% of the channel's budget.

On 30 April 2007 the channel became Comedy Central, effectively taking the name of the US network of the same name.

On 31 July 2009 the timeshift version Comedy Central +1 was launched. From 1 November 2010 Comedy Central and its timeshift have been broadcasting in 16:9 wide format.

On 5 December 2013 and 24 May 2019 the channel changed its logo and graphics, uniforming to US version.

On 1 December 2025, the +1 timeshift version of the channel officially ceased all broadcasting operations.
