= Sky Uno =

Italian television channel

- Logo used since 2021
- Country: Italy
- Broadcast area: Italy

Programming
- Languages: Italian and English
- Picture format: 576i (SDTV); 1080i (HDTV)
- Timeshift service: Sky Uno +

Ownership
- Owner: Sky Italia (Sky)(Comcast)
- Sister channels: Sky Atlantic; Sky Serie; Sky Investigation; Sky Documentaries; Sky Adventure; Sky Nature; Sky Arte

History
- Launched: 1 April 2009; 17 years ago 21 April 2009; 17 years ago (Sky Uno +1); 20 October 2011; 15 years ago (Sky Uno HD); 25 October 2012; 14 years ago (Sky Uno +1 HD); 19 April 2018; 8 years ago (Sky Uno Vetrina); 7 December 2025; 11 months ago (Sky Uno +)
- Former names: SKY Canale 109 (2004-2005); SKY Vivo (2005-2009)

Availability

Streaming media
- Sky Go: Sky Uno
- Now: Sky Uno

Sky Uno (English: Sky One) is an Italian entertainment television channel, based on the defunct reality television channel SKY Vivo, both owned and operated by Sky Italia.

It broadcasts Italian dubs of the shows The X Factor, Got Talent, The Apprentice, MasterChef, MasterChef Junior, Hell's Kitchen and Top Gear.

The channel began broadcasting in high-definition on 20 October 2011.

== Programming ==
=== Current ===
- 10 Years Younger (American TV series)
- America's Got Talent
- America's Next Top Model
- Beverly Hills, 90210
- Crossing Jordan
- Late Show with Stephen Colbert
- Extreme Makeover: Home Edition
- Hell's Kitchen
- Hell's Kitchen Italia
- Hung
- Italia's Next Top Model
- Kath & Kim
- Make Me a Supermodel
- My Kitchen Rules
- Providence
- Rita Rocks
- Sei più bravo di un ragazzino di 5ª?
- Top Chef
- The Renovators
- X Factor
- E poi c'è cattelan

=== Former programming ===
- 10 Years Younger (British TV series)
- American Idol
- Amici di Maria De Filippi
- Boy Meets Boy
- Celebrity Survivor
- Colin and Justin's Home Heist
- Don't Forget the Lyrics!
- Gay, Straight or Taken?
- Grande Fratello
- Hotel Babylon
- La Talpa
- Late Show With David Letterman
- My Bare Lady
- Oprah's Big Give
- Shock Treatment
- Stylista
- The Biggest Loser
- The First 48
- The L Word
- The Office
- Un Paso Adelante
- Wild at Heart
- Work Out

== Logos ==
Logo used from 2009-2010

Logo used from 2010-2011

Logo used from 2011-2013

Logo used from 2013-2015

Logo used from 2015-2018

Logo used from 2018–2021

Logo used from 2021–present
