= 2007 in Italy =

- Decades: 1980s; 1990s; 2000s; 2010s; 2020s
- See also: History of Italy; Timeline of Italian history; List of years in Italy

Events during the year 2007 in Italy.

== Incumbents ==
- President: Giorgio Napolitano
- Prime Minister: Romano Prodi

== Events ==
=== January – March ===
- 9 January - Abu Omar case: hearings begin on whether to charge 25 CIA agents with kidnapping for the "extraordinary rendition" of Osama Nasr in 2003. The named agents have left the country. (Al Jazeera) (BBC News)
- 13 January - 10 former members of the SS are sentenced in absentia to life imprisonment for their role in the Marzabotto massacre, the worst massacre in Italy during World War II. (BBC)
- 31 January - Controversies surrounding Silvio Berlusconi: Veronica Lario's letter in La Repubblica demands her husband Silvio Berlusconi to apologise for comments to other women, that "damaged her dignity" - Berlusconi quickly apologizes.
- 2 February - One 38-year-old policeman is killed in the Catania football clashes in Italy. 71 people are taken to the hospital.
- 3 February - After calls from Italian Prime Minister Romano Prodi to cancel all matches, Italian Football Federation commissioner Luca Pancalli indefinitely suspends all football matches in Italy while an investigation into riots begins. (The Guardian) (Wikinews)
- 12 February - Police arrest 15 people in raids in northern Italy, who the police claimed were associated with the Red Brigades terrorist group. (BBC)
- 16 February - An Italian judge has ordered 26 U.S. citizens, most of them CIA agents, to stand trial over the Osama Nasr kidnapping in Milan in 2003. (BBC)
- 16 February - The President of Afghanistan Hamid Karzai meets in Rome with the Prime Minister of Italy Romano Prodi to discuss Italian contributions to the fight against the Taliban and drug traffickers in Afghanistan. (BBC) (→ Afghanistan–Italy relations)
- 17 February - Italians demonstrate against the expansion of a United States Army base in Vicenza, home of the 173rd Airborne Brigade. (BBC)
- 19 February - Between 40,000 to 100,000 Italians march in protest against the extension of Caserma Ederle, a United States Army military base near Vicenza. (BBC)
- 21 February - Romano Prodi tenders his resignation as Prime Minister of Italy, after a defeat by two votes in the Senate. (Ansa Notizie) (BBC)
- 22 February - Leaders of Italy's centre-left coalition have agreed to support Romano Prodi and a 12-point program meaning that he can resume serving as Prime Minister of Italy. (Reuters via Swissinfo)
- 27 February - The ambassadors from the United States and Italy to Sri Lanka are injured by mortar fire while visiting eastern Sri Lanka. (CNN) (→ Sri Lankan civil war)
- 28 February - Romano Prodi survives a no-confidence motion in the Senate. (CNN)
- 1 March - India requests the extradition of Italian businessman Ottavio Quattrocchi from Argentina in relation to the Bofors scandal. (NDTV)
- 2 March - Italian leader Romano Prodi is reinstated as prime minister after winning his second and final confidence vote in the Parliament, ending a political crisis that began last week when Prodi resigned after losing a foreign policy vote. (CNN)
- 7 March - The Taliban claim that they have kidnapped Daniele Mastrogiacomo, an Italian journalist working for La Repubblica newspaper. (Washington Post)
- 10 March - Thousands of supporters of legislation giving equal rights on issues to heterosexual and gay couples in Italy attend a rally in Rome. (AP via the Houston Chronicle)
- 15 March - The Movement for the Emancipation of the Niger Delta frees two Italian oilworkers that it took captive last year in Nigeria. (Reuters via CNN)
- 18 March - Cesare Battisti, convicted in absentia of two murders in Italy in the 1970s and who later became a crime writer in France, is arrested in Brazil. (Fox News)
- 19 March - Daniele Mastrogiacomo is set free by the Taliban. He had been kidnapped in the Afghan province of Helmand on March 6. (BBC)

=== April – June ===
- 12 April - Riot police clash with hundreds of Chinese merchants in Milan after scuffles break out over traffic problems in Chinatown. (Reuters via the Melbourne Age)
- 2 May - Book La Casta (The Caste: How Italian Politicians Became Untouchable) is published; sold in 1,2 million copies this year.
- 23 May - Champions League final in Athens: AC Milan - Liverpool F.C. 2–1.
- May - June - Local elections (→ it)
- 6 June - Five people are acquitted in Rome of the 1982 murder of "God's Banker," financier Roberto Calvi.
- 7 June - Italian police arrest a group of people for allegedly providing material support for an al Qaeda-linked organisation, Salafist Group for Call and Combat. (AP via CNN)
- 12 June - Erich Priebke received authorization to leave his home to work at his lawyer's office in Rome - overturned due to angry protests.
- 17 June - Linate Airport in Milan is closed for three hours at dawn to allow wildlife experts to trap 80 hares that have bred in recent months and are confusing ground radar. (BBC)

=== July – September ===
- 21 July - Italian police arrest three Moroccans and accuse them of running a small "terror school" in a small mosque near Perugia. (CNN)
- 24 July - Five mountain climbers freeze to death in the Italian Alps. (Reuters via News Limited)
- 25 July - 2007 Tour de France: Cristian Moreni fails a doping test and is led away for questioning by French police (Fox News)
- 9 August - A blaze at the Cinecittà film studio complex in Rome burns down several buildings. (ABC News Australia)
- 12 August - Italian police uncover a secret plan to smuggle Russian weapons into Iraq. (AP via Forbes)
- 13 August - Murder of Chiara Poggi
- 14 August - The Italian coast guard finds the dead bodies of 14 illegal immigrants near the shores of the Lampedusa island. (BBC)
- 15 August - Six Italians are found shot to death in the town of Duisburg, Germany. Police say they were connected to 'Ndrangheta. (Fox News) (BBC)
- 30 August - Scores of Italians are arrested in a crackdown on the 'ndrangheta organised crime clans active in Calabria. (AP via CNN)
- 6 September - Italian tenor Luciano Pavarotti dies at 71, after suffering from pancreatic cancer for more than one year. (BBC)
- 8 September - Vaffanculo Day in many Italian cities, launched by Beppe Grillo (Five Star Movement founded in 2009).
- 9 September - Jamaican Asafa Powell set a new men's world 100 meters record of 9.74 seconds at the IAAF Grand Prix at Rieti, Italy. (CNN)

=== October – December ===
- 1 October - Pope Benedict XVI replaced Archbishop Piero Marini, the longtime director of office of papal liturgies, with Father Guido Marini of the Genoa archdiocese. (Novus Motus Liturgicus)
- 14 October - Three million Italians go to the polls to elect the leader of the new Democratic Party. The current Mayor of Rome, Walter Veltroni, wins with about 75% of the votes. (AFP via Google News)
- 19 October - Leaders of the European Union reach agreement on the Lisbon Treaty following last-minute concessions to Poland, Italy and Bulgaria. (EuObserver) (ABC News Australia)
- 20 October - Hundreds of thousands of left wing Italians march in Rome putting increased pressure on the Prime Minister of Italy Romano Prodi. (Reuters via ABC News Australia)
- 1 November - Murder of Meredith Kercher.
- 5 November - Italian police arrest Sicilian mafia boss Salvatore Lo Piccolo, his son Sandro and two other mafiosi in Carini, Palermo. (BBC)
- 8 November -
  - A United States Army UH-60 Black Hawk helicopter crashes in Santa Lucia di Piave, Treviso, killing four people and injuring six. (BBC)
  - Mario Balotelli debuts for Inter Milan in a friendly with Sheffield F.C..
- 10 November - Workers at La Scala opera house in Milan go on strike in a dispute over pay and contracts. (BBC)
- 11 November - Murder of Gabriele Sandri
- 12 November - The Milan Court of Appeal sentences Giovanni Consorte, Ivano Sacchetti and Emilio Gnutti to six months in jail for insider trading in the Unipol case. (Rainews24)
- 18 November - Silvio Berlusconi, Italy's former Prime Minister, announces he will dissolve the Forza Italia party and found a new one called Freedom People's Party. (BBC)

=== Literature ===
- The Italian, novel by Sebastiano Vassalli
- Manituana, novel by the writers' collective Wu Ming
- The Track of Sand, novel by Andrea Camilleri

== Births ==
- 17 February – Tara Dragas, rhythmic gymnast

== Deaths ==
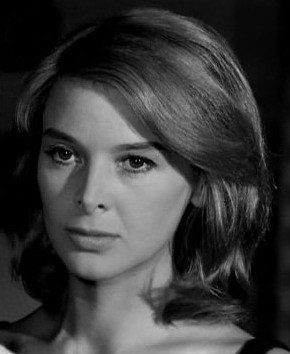
Eleonora Rossi Drago

- 26 January – Emanuele Luzzati, painter, production designer and animator (b. 1921).
- 8 February – Adele Faccio, civil right activist (b. 1920).
- 26 February – Angelo Arcidiacono, fencer (b. 1955).
- 3 March –

- Osvaldo Cavandoli, cartoonist (b. 1920).
- Benito Lorenzi, footballer (b. 1925).

- 19 March – Giampaolo Calanchini, fencer (b. 1937).
- 21 May – Bruno Mattei, film director, screenwriter and editor (b. 1931)
- 23 July – Franco Cuomo, writer (b. 1938).
- 24 July – Giorgio Anglesio, fencer (b. 1922).
- 6 September – Luciano Pavarotti, operatic tenor (b. 1935).
- 21 September – Mauro Mellano, Italian economist and university professor.
- 7 October – Luciana Frassati Gawronska, writer (b. 1902).
- 2 December – Eleonora Rossi Drago, actress (b. 1925).

== See also ==
- 2007 in Italian television
- List of Italian films of 2007
