= 2006 in Italy =

- Decades: 1980s; 1990s; 2000s; 2010s; 2020s
- See also: History of Italy; Timeline of Italian history; List of years in Italy

Events during the year 2006 in Italy.

== Incumbents ==
- President:

- Carlo Azeglio Ciampi (until 15 May)
- Giorgio Napolitano (from 15 May)

- Prime Minister:

- Silvio Berlusconi (until 17 May)
- Romano Prodi (from 17 May)

== Events ==
=== January – March ===
- 2 January – Russia–Ukraine gas dispute: Italy supplies are down by 30%. (Sky News)
- 19 January – Italy will conclude its mission in Iraq by the end of the year, in the first clear timetable for Rome to withdraw its troops, says Defense Minister Antonio Martino. (ABC)
- 20 January – Archeologists digging under the Roman Forum discover a tomb estimated at 3000 years old, predating the creation of the Forum by several centuries. (USA Today)
- 10 February – An atheist who sued a small-town priest for saying that Jesus Christ existed has had his case thrown out of court by a judge in Italy. (BBC)
- 10–26 February – The Olympic Winter Games are held in Turin.
- 11 February – H5N1 avian flu virus: first cases of infected wild birds reported in Italy, swans thought to have migrated from Russia in recent months. (BBC)
- 12 February – Prime minister Silvio Berlusconi causes a political storm by comparing himself to Jesus Christ. (BBC)
- 15 February – Italian ambassador Francesco Trupiano apologizes to Libya on behalf of Italian minister of Constitutional Reform Roberto Calderoli, who suggested Italy use "force against Muslims." (Angola Press)
- 17 February – In Libya, at least eleven protesters are killed in riots protesting the Muhammad cartoons outside the Italian consulate in Benghazi, which is burned. (MSNBC)
- 18 February – Reform minister Roberto Calderoli resigns after criticism for wearing a T-shirt depicting the Muhammad cartoons. (BBC)
- 2 March – Judges in Milan to charge Prime Minister Silvio Berlusconi and David Mills (husband of Tessa Jowell, a British Minister) in connection with a bribery scandal. (Independent)
- 3 March – An Italian parliamentary commission accuses the former Soviet Union of orchestrating the 1981 attempt to assassinate Pope John Paul II (Telegraph)
- 10–19 March – The Paralympic Winter Games are held in Turin.
- 29 March – Afghan Christian convert Abdul Rahman takes political asylum in Italy. Many Islamic clerics and members of Afghanistan's parliament protest his release. (MSNBC), (BBC)

=== April – June ===
- 9–10 April – General election: Romano Prodi, leader of the centre-left coalition The Union, narrowly defeated the incumbent Prime Minister Silvio Berlusconi, leader of the centre-right coalition House of Freedoms.
- 11 April – Bernardo Provenzano captured near Corleone.
- 2 May – Murder of Tommaso Onofri
- 8-10 May – Presidential election
- 18 May – New Italian prime minister Romano Prodi pledges to withdraw Italian troops from Iraq and calls the Iraq war a "grave mistake that has not solved but increased the problem of security". (Guardian) (Al Jazeera)
- 28–29 May – Local elections
- 1 June – The new Justice Minister, Clemente Mastella, announces that left-wing militant Adriano Sofri could be pardoned before the end of the year (AGI).
- 16 June – Vittorio Emanuele, Prince of Naples, is arrested as part of an investigation into corruption and prostitution. (BBC)
- 23 June – After 16 years in office, Angelo Sodano retires as Cardinal Secretary of State. He will be succeeded by Tarcisio Bertone, until now Archbishop of Genoa. (Holy See Bollettino)
- 25-26 June – Constitutional referendum about federalization: rejected by 61%.

=== July – September ===
- 9 July – Italy wins the FIFA World Cup by defeating France, 5–3, following a penalty shootout in the final game at the Olympic Stadium in Berlin, Germany.
- 13 July – Two explosions hit oil installations belonging to an Italian company in Nigeria's southeast region. Sabotage is the suspected cause. (Associated Press)
- 11 August – Transatlantic aircraft plot: 40 people have been arrested throughout Italy, in Muslim communities "as part of an extraordinary operation that followed the British anti-terrorist operation." (Fox News)
- 13 August – Air Algérie Flight 2208 accident
- 21 August – 2006 Israel-Lebanon conflict: Italy offers to lead the United Nations peacekeeping forces in Lebanon instead of France. Italy has offered to provide 2,000 forces, more than any other nation, and France is only offering to provide 200 civil engineers. (UPI)
- 2 September – Italian troops arrive in Lebanon as part of the United Nations Interim Force in Lebanon. (CNN)

=== October – December ===
- 3 October – Turkish Airlines Flight 1476, a Turkish Airlines plane carrying 113 people from Tirana, Albania to Istanbul, Turkey, was hijacked, but lands at Italy's Brindisi Airport. The hijackers surrendered and were arrested by Italian police. (Fox News)
- 11 October – Carlo Acutis, a 15 year old boy dies of acute promyelocytic leukaemia in San Gerardo Hospital north of Milan, Italy. He is canonised on 7 September 2025 and has been referred to as the "patron saint of the Internet", "God's Influencer" and the "first millennial saint".
- 16 October – UN Security Council election: Italy is among countries elected by The United Nations General Assembly to two-year terms on the Security Council, commencing 1 January 2007. (BBC)
- 17 October – 2006 Rome Metro crash
- 27 October – Murder of Riccardo Rasman
- 26 November – Former Italian Prime Minister Silvio Berlusconi collapses while giving a speech in Tuscany and has to be carried from the podium by his aides. Doctors treating him afterwards blamed a sudden drop in blood pressure. (BBC News)
- 2 December – London police are examining whether the killers of Alexander Litvinenko also tried to poison Mario Scaramella, an Italian security expert who met the Russian exile on the day that he fell ill. (The Times)
- 7 December – Nigerian gun men attack an Agip oil terminal in the Niger River delta and take three Italians hostage. (Reuters)
- 11 December – Erba Massacre
- 15 December – Retired Formula One driver Clay Regazzoni dies in a car accident when the Chrysler Voyager he was driving hit a lorry head on, outside Parma, Italy. (BBC)

=== Full date unknown ===
- Drug Target Insights academic journal is founded.

== Births ==
- 14 March – Simone Pafundi, footballer
- 25 May – Lorenzo Galossi, swimmer
- 6 June – Angela Andreoli, artistic gymnast
- 25 August – Andrea Kimi Antonelli, racing driver
- 9 October – Matteo Santoro, diver
- 2 November – Manila Esposito, footballer
- 7 November – Giulia Dragoni, footballer
- 15 November – Lara Colturi, alpine skier

== Deaths ==
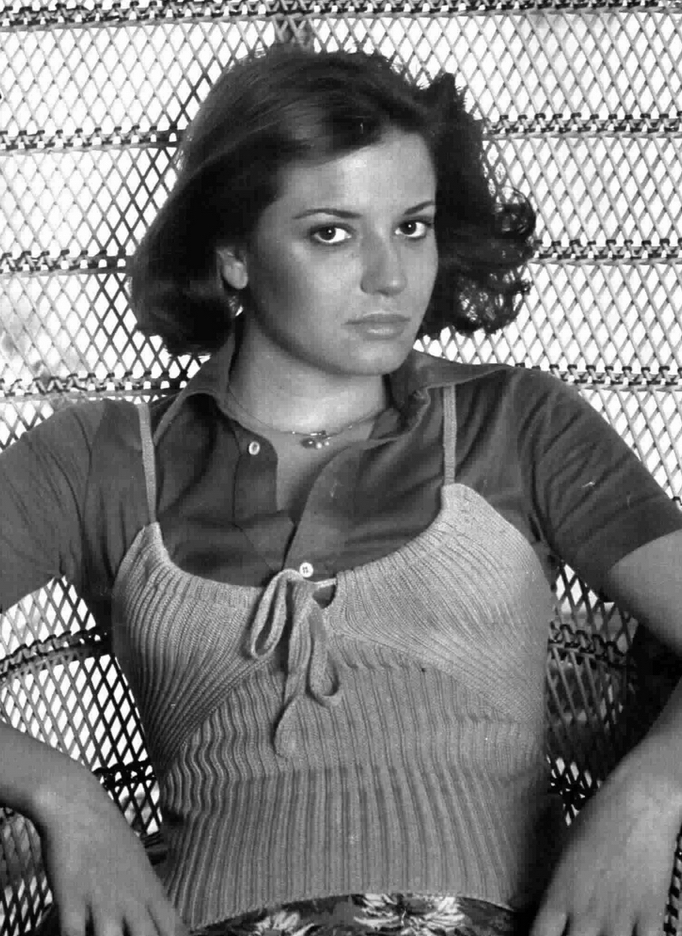
Jenny Tamburi

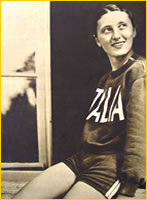
Ondina Valla

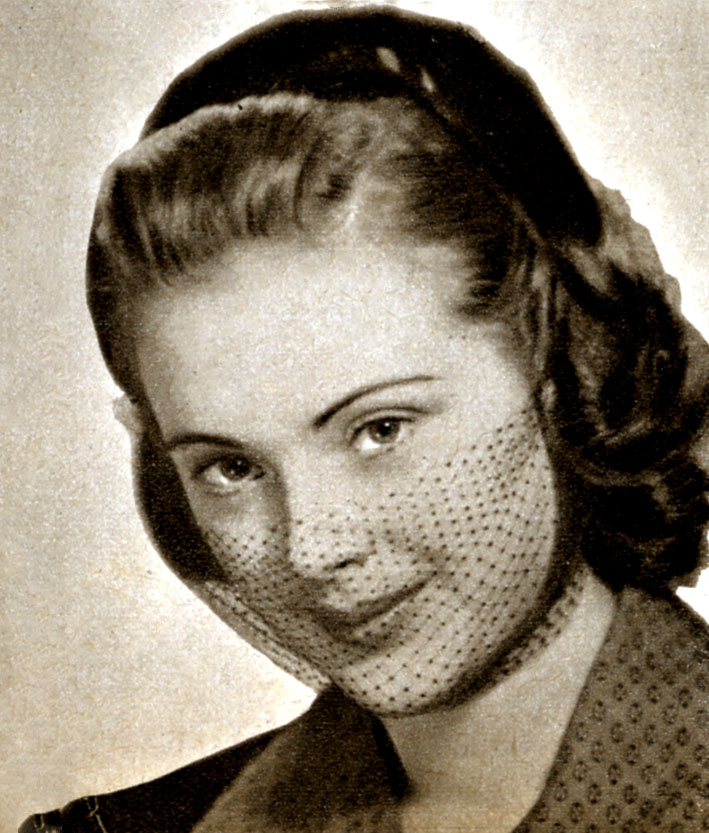
Milly Vitale

- 1 March – Jenny Tamburi, actress and television hostess (b. 1952).
- 5 April – Pasquale Macchi, Roman Catholic archbishop (b. 1923).
- 22 April – Alida Valli, actress (b. 1921).
- 11 May – Ferdinando Tacconi, comics artist (b. 1922).
- 9 June – Enzo Siciliano, writer (b. 1934).
- 15 June – Betty Curtis, singer (b. 1936)
- 12 July – Loredana Nusciak, actress and model (b. 1942).
- 20 July – Ugo Attardi, painter, sculptor and writer (b. 1923).
- 31 July – Mario Faustinelli, comic book artist (b. 1924).
- 20 August – Giuseppe Moccia, film director (b. 1933)
- 15 September – Sergio Savarese, furniture designer (b. 1958).
- 17 September – Leonella Sgorbati, nun (b. 1940).
- 12 October – Carlo Acutis, English-born Italian Catholic computer programmer (b. 1991)
- 16 October – Ondina Valla, hurdler (b. 1916).
- 25 October – Emilio Vedova, painter (b. 1919).
- 2 November – Milly Vitale, actress (b. 1933).
- 25 November – Luciano Bottaro, comic book creator (b. 1931).
- 26 November –

- Leo Chiosso, songwriter (b. 1920).
- Giorgio Panto, television station owner and politician, (b. 1941).

- 28 November – Primo Volpi, 90, Italian cyclist (b. 1916).
- 13 December – Mario Ravagnan, fencer (b. 1930).
- 28 December –

- Nicola Granieri, fencer (b. 1942).
- Aroldo Tieri, actor (b. 1917).

== See also ==
- 2006 in Italian television
