= 2005 in Italy =

- Decades: 1980s; 1990s; 2000s; 2010s; 2020s
- See also: History of Italy; Timeline of Italian history; List of years in Italy

Events during the year 2005 in Italy.

== Incumbents ==
- President: Carlo Azeglio Ciampi
- Prime Minister: Silvio Berlusconi

== Events ==
- 7 January – Crevalcore train crash.
- 1 August – Murders of Aldo Donegani and Luisa De Leo.
- 24 October – Eurostar 9410 derailment.

== Deaths ==
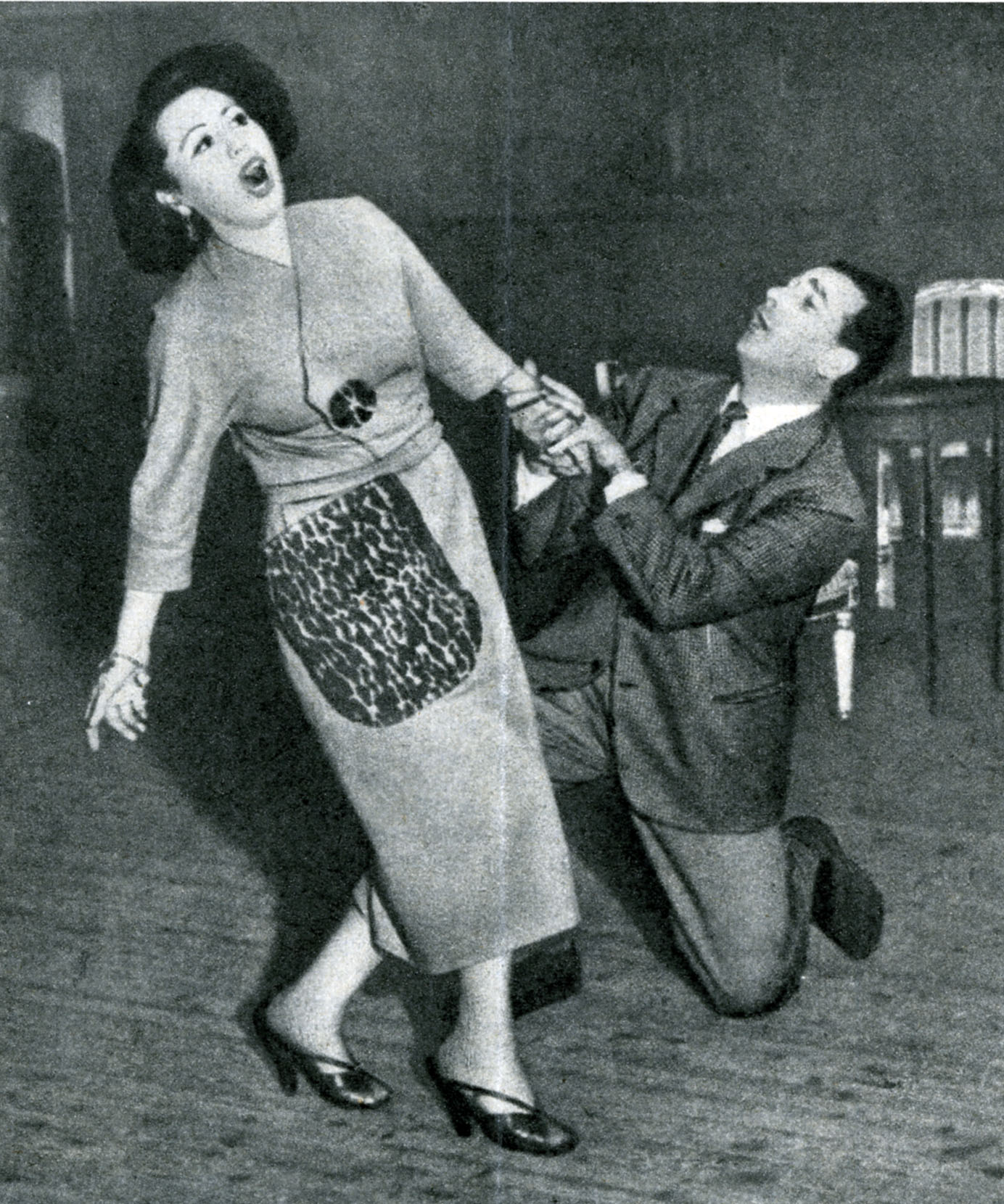
Margherita Carosio

- 9 January – Artidoro Berti, long-distance runner (b. 1920).
- 10 January – Margherita Carosio, soprano (b. 1908).
- 11 January – Fabrizio Meoni, off-road and rallying motorcycle racer (b. 1957).
- 1 February – Franco Mannino, composer (b. 1924).
- 3 February – Corrado Bafile, Roman Catholic cardinal (b. 1903).
- 1 March – Sergio Campanato, mathematician (b. 1930).
- 15 March – Renzo Alverà, bobsledder (b. 1933).
- 17 June – Susanna Javicoli, actress (b. 1954).
- 3 July – Alberto Lattuada, film director (b. 1914).
- 13 August – Wladimiro Calarese, fencer (b. 1930).
- 16 August – Tonino Delli Colli, cinematographer (b. 1923).
- 1 October – Renzo Nostini, fencer (b. 1914).
- 6 October – Marta Grandi, entomologist. (b. 1915)
- 16 December – Enzo Stuarti, tenor (b. 1919).
