= 2008 in Italy =

- Decades: 1980s; 1990s; 2000s; 2010s; 2020s
- See also: History of Italy; Timeline of Italian history; List of years in Italy

Events during the year 2008 in Italy.

Italy was hit hard by the Great Recession.

== Incumbents ==
- President: Giorgio Napolitano
- Prime Minister:

- Romano Prodi (until 8 May)
- Silvio Berlusconi (from 8 May)

== Events ==
=== January ===
- 8 January : due to the worsening of the waste crisis in Campania and the riots that broke out as a result, the government appoints Gianni De Gennaro as liquidator and decides to send the Army to the region.
- 16 January: Minister of Justice Clemente Mastella resigns after his wife was put under house arrest for corruption charges. His party, Union of Democrats for Europe, later decides not to support government.
- 24 January: Start of the 2008 Italian political crisis - Prime Minister Romano Prodi lost vote of confidence (→ Second Prodi government).
- 26 January : the president of the Sicilian Region, Salvatore Cuffaro, resigns amidst the controversy after being sentenced in the first instance to 5 years for personal aiding and abetting against defendants in Mafia trials.

=== February ===
- 6 February : the President of the Republic Giorgio Napolitano decrees the dissolution of the chambers and the end of the 15th legislature, after the failure of the exploratory assignment entrusted to the President of the Senate Franco Marini. General elections are set for 13 and 14 April.
- 7 February: There are mass arrests in the United States and Italy in an anti-Mafia sweep including three suspected senior members of the Gambino crime family. (Reuters)
- 21 February: Italy recognised Kosovo.
- 28 February: Saadi v Italy, a case of deportation to Tunisia, is decided by European Court of Human Rights.

=== March ===
- 25 February – 1 March: Sanremo Music Festival 2008: The Big Artists section won by the duo Giò Di Tonno and Lola Ponce with the song "Colpo di fulmine"; newcomers' section won by Sonohra with "L'amore".
- 3 March: Padre Pio's body was exhumed from his crypt.
- 10 March: First season of Italian X Factor starts.
- 13 - 24 March: European Aquatics Championships in Eindhoven - 5 Gold, 7 Silver and 9 Bronze medals for Italy. Federica Pellegrini sets a World Record in 400 m freestyle and Alessia Filippi a National Record in 800 m freestyle.
- 15 March: a hundred thousand parade in Bari against the mafia in a demonstration organized by Libera
- 16 March: Alitalia airline is purchased by a consortium of Air France and KLM for €138 million. (BBC News)
- 23 March: Magdi Allam, the most prominent Muslim in Italy, converts to Catholicism and is baptized by Pope Benedict XVI.
- 31 March:
  - Milan will host Expo 2015.
  - Artist Pippa Bacca killed in Turkey.

=== April ===
- 13 - 14 April: 2008 Italian general election, won by Berlusconi's new party, The People of Freedom.
- 29 April: Start of Legislature XVI (ends in 2013).

=== May ===
- 8 May: Silvio Berlusconi takes over as prime minister, succeeding Romano Prodi. Fourth Berlusconi government ends in 2011.
- 9 May: Shadow Cabinet of Italy, led by Walter Veltroni is officially presented (dissolved in 2009).
- 18 May: 2007–08 Serie A ended: Inter Milan defended the championship.
- 25 May: Gomorrah by Matteo Garrone won Grand Prix at the 2008 Cannes Film Festival. (→ List of Italian films of 2008)
- 30 May: Fishermen in Spain, Portugal and Italy strike to protest against high fuel prices.

=== June ===
- 2 June: the famous TV series for children by nickelodeon iCarly is broadcast for the first time dubbed in Italian.
- 7 - 29 June: UEFA Euro 2008 in Austria and Switzerland: Italy eliminated in the quarter-finals on penalties to eventual champions Spain (→ The decline of the world champions (2006–2010))
- 27 June: Trials and allegations involving Silvio Berlusconi: his Cabinet launched a bill giving him immunity from prosecution while he remains in office (→ Lodo Alfano, declared unconstitutional in October 2009)

=== August ===
- 8 - 24 August: Italy at the 2008 Summer Olympics, in Beijing: 344 athletes in 22 sports; 8 gold, 9 silver, 10 bronze medals.
- 29 August: Alitalia files for bankruptcy protection.
- 30 August: The Treaty of Benghazi: Italy apologized and compensated (5 billion dollars plus the medical care for those who were harmed from the remnants of colonialism) for its previous colonization; Libya agreed to fight against illegal migration.

=== September ===
- 14 September: Sebastian Vettel wins the Italian Grand Prix, marking him the youngest Formula One winner until Max Verstappen beats Vettel's record at the 2016 Spanish Grand Prix.
- 18 September: Castel Volturno massacre: seven were killed, mostly African migrants.
- 30 September: 30 suspected mobsters arrested around Naples in "war against the Camorra". (BBC News)

=== October ===
- 17 October: Novembre by Giusy Ferreri was released digitally, it debuted at the number one spot on the Italian charts, where it remains until 16 January. (→ List of number-one hits of 2008 (Italy))
- 29 October: Murder of Meredith Kercher (2007): Guede sentenced to 30 years. Knox and Sollecito charged with murder, sexual assault.
- 30 October : Sardinia becomes the first region in Europe to receive only the digital terrestrial signal, thus carrying out the first switch-off of the analog signal in Italy.

=== November ===
- 10 November: Italian Prime Minister Silvio Berlusconi repeats a comment that United States President-elect Barack Obama is "young, handsome and also tanned," refusing to apologize for remarks he insisted are "flattering" (→ Controversies surrounding Silvio Berlusconi).
- 13 November: Aftermath of 27th G8 summit in Genoa 2001: court cleared 16 of the most senior police officers, 13 police officers were convicted.
- 13 November: Supreme Court of Cassation awarded father of Eluana Englaro the right to stop his daughter from being fed (feeding was discontinued next February).

=== December ===
- 28 December: Four boats carrying approximately 1,700 illegal Libyan migrants arrive on the Italian island of Lampedusa. (BBC)
- 31 December: Italy's mandate as non-permanent member of the United Nations Security Council expires.

== Deaths ==
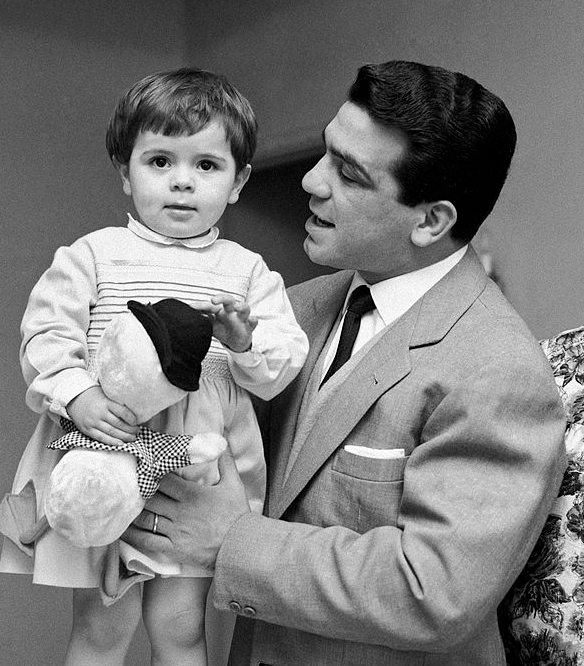
Duilio Loi

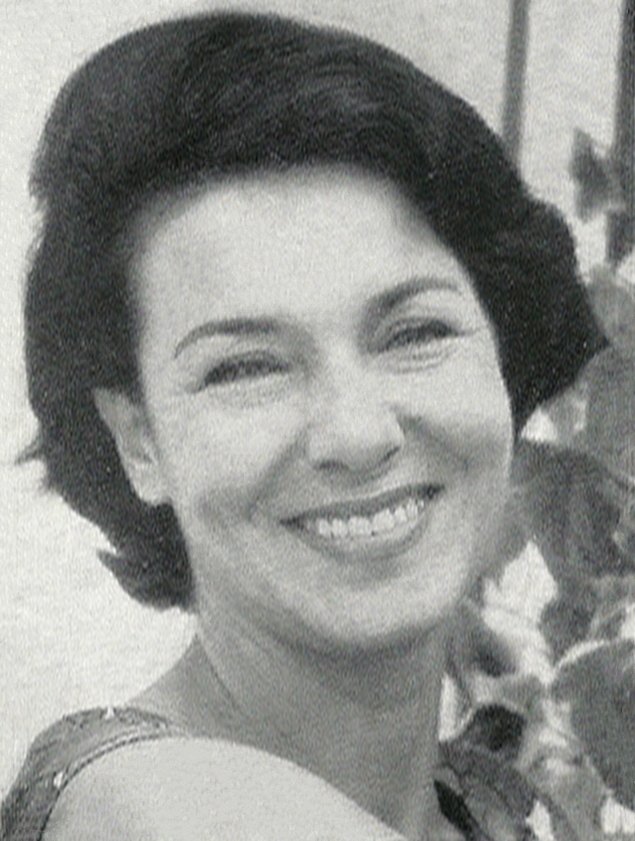
Dina Sassoli

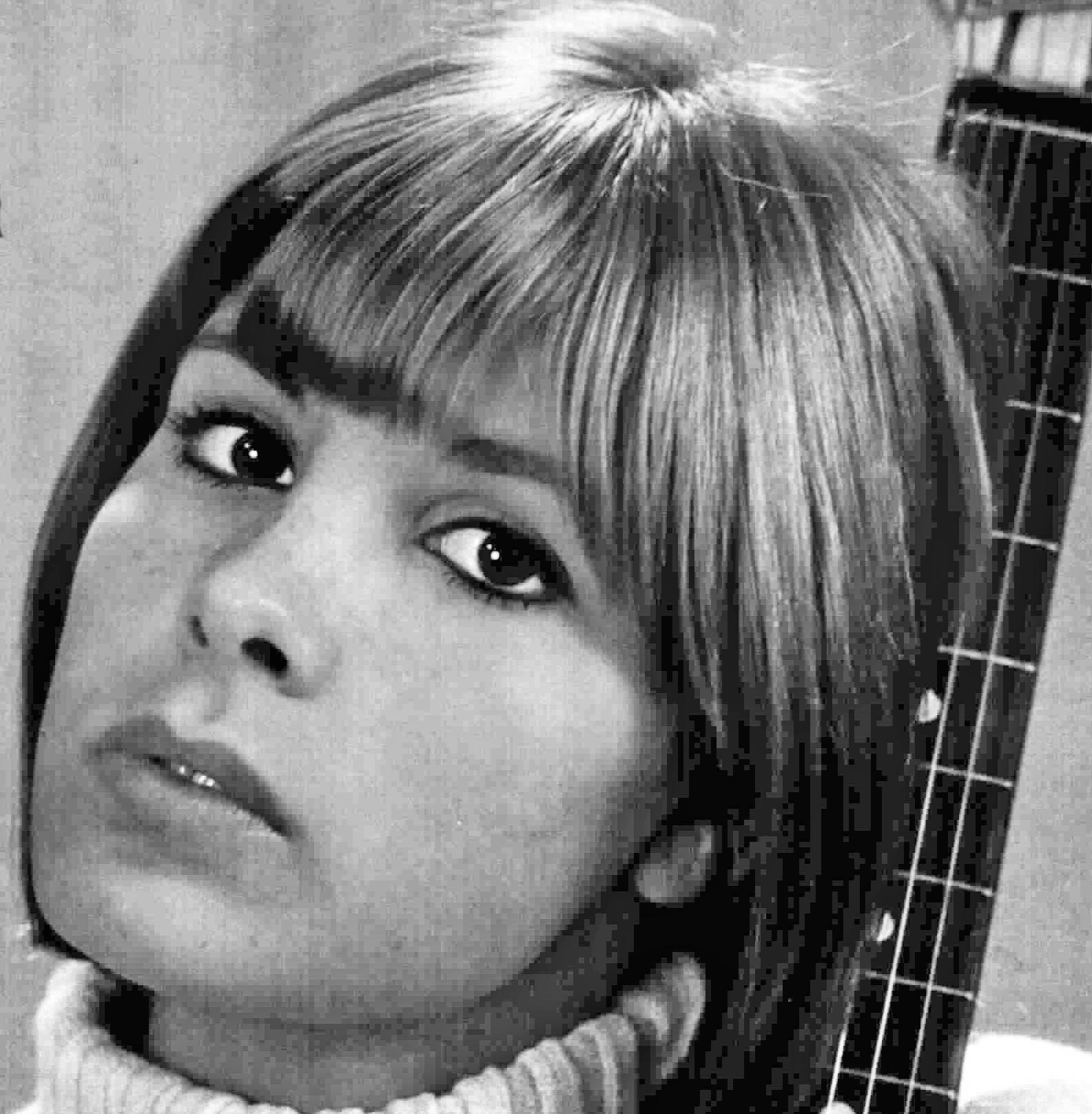
Marisa Sannia

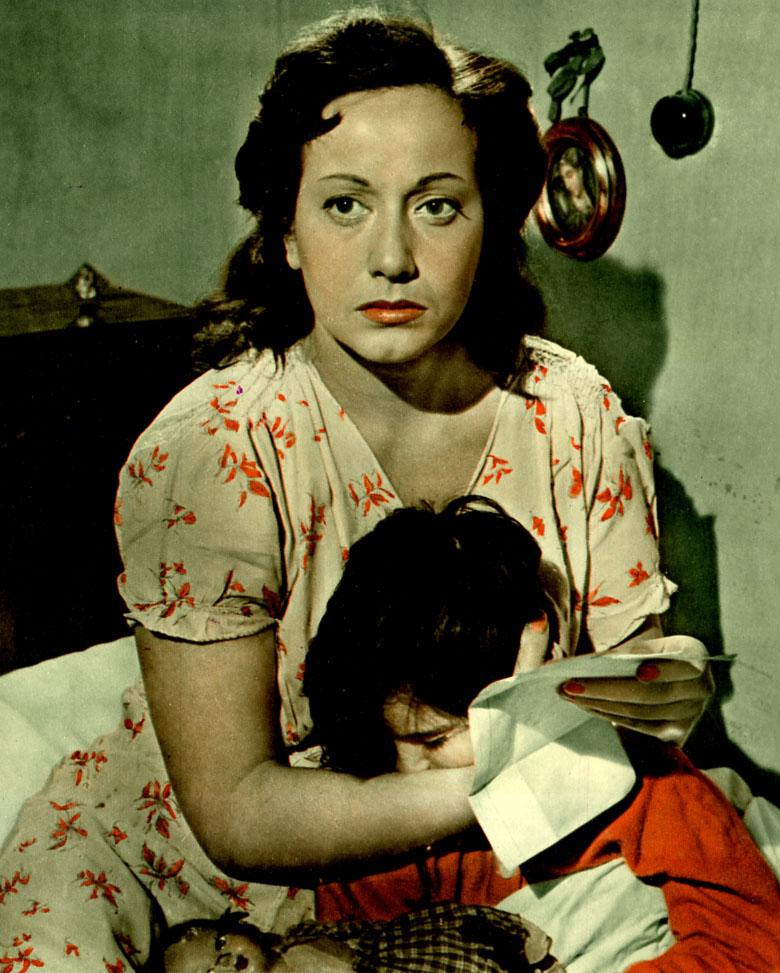
Marisa Merlini

=== January ===
- 5 January – Giovanni Rinaldo Coronas, politician, police chief and Interior Minister (b. 1919).
- 6 January – Vittorio Tomassetti, Bishop of Fano-Fossombrone-Cagli-Pergola (b. 1930).
- 17 January – Giuliana Penzi, dancer and choreographer (b. 1918).
- 18 January –

- Pier Miranda Ferraro, operatic tenor (b. 1924).
- Ugo Pirro, screenwriter and novelist (b. 1920).

- 20 January – Duilio Loi, boxer (b. 1929).

=== February ===
- 3 February – Ernesto Illy, food chemist and businessman (b. 1925)
- 11 February – Carolina Tronconi, gymnast, Olympic silver medalist (b. 1913).
- 13 February – Michele Greco, Mafia boss (b. 1924).
- 16 February –

- Vittorio Lucarelli, fencer (b. 1928).
- Fabio Presca, basketball player (b. 1930).

- 17 February – Nicola Agnozzi, Roman Catholic prelate (b. 1911).
- 22 February – Nunzio Gallo, singer (b. 1928).

=== March ===
- 3 March – Giuseppe Di Stefano, operatic tenor (b. 1921).
- 4 March – Tina Lagostena Bassi, lawyer and politician (b. 1926).
- 7 March – Leonardo Costagliola, footballer (b. 1921).
- 12 March – Lazare Ponticelli, Italian-born French veteran of World War I (b. 1897).
- 14 March – Chiara Lubich, Catholic activist (b. 1920).
- 18 March – Oreste Rizzini, voice actor (b. 1940).
- 24 March – Dina Sassoli, actress (b. 1920).

=== April ===
- 14 April – Marisa Sannia, singer (b. 1942).

=== July ===
- 23 July – Anna Maria Cantù, sprinter (b. 1923).
- 27 July – Marisa Merlini, actress (b. 1923).

=== August ===
- 4 August - Anita Farra, actress (b. 1905).
- 14 August – Luigi Grossi, Olympic sprinter (b. 1925).

=== September ===
- 5 September – Mila Schön, fashion designer (b. 1916).

=== October ===
- 5 October – Leopoldo Elia, politician (b. 1925).

=== December ===
- 20 December – Samuele Bacchiocchi, theologian (b. 1938).
- 28 December – Claudio Vitalone, politician (b. 1936)
