= Mellano =

Mellano is an Italian surname. Notable people with the surname include:

- Mauro Mellano (1944–2007), Italian economist
- Olivier Mellano (born 1971), French composer
