= 2002 in Italy =

- Decades: 1980s; 1990s; 2000s; 2010s; 2020s
- See also: History of Italy; Timeline of Italian history; List of years in Italy

Events during the year 2002 in Italy.

== Incumbents ==
- President: Carlo Azeglio Ciampi
- Prime Minister: Silvio Berlusconi

== Events ==
- 1 January — The Euro Currency officially became the legal tender for Italy, along with the other European Union (EU) Eurozone member area countries, replacing the Italian lira by being introduced physically with the official launch of the currency coins and banknotes.
  - 30 January – Cogne case
- 18 April – 2002 Pirelli Tower plane crash
- 28 May – 2002 Rome summit
- 31 October – 2002 Molise earthquakes

== Sports ==
- 2002 Giro d'Italia
- 2002 Milan Indoor
- 2002 Milan–San Remo
- 2002 Italian motorcycle Grand Prix
- 2002 San Marino Grand Prix
- Serie B 2001–02
- Serie B 2002–03

== Arts ==
- 59th Venice International Film Festival
