= Summary (law) =

Summary, in law, forms many compounds as an adjective meaning "short, concise":

- Summary abatement, the abatement of a nuisance without judicial proceeding, even without notice or hearing, often by a destruction of the offending thing or structure.
- Summary contempt proceeding, a proceeding to adjudicate contempt in the immediate presence of the court, without pleading, affidavit, or formal charges—albeit the accused may be entitled to a hearing or at least opportunity to make an explanation of his conduct under oath.
- Summary conviction, convicting an accused without giving them the benefit of a jury trial and/or indictment.
- Summary court-martial, the lowest in the rank of courts-martial, conducted before one commissioned officer, limited in jurisdiction to offenses of a minor or petty nature of which enlisted men, not commissioned officers, stand accused.
- Summary dismissal, a dismissal of a civil service employee without giving them opportunity to defend themselves or a hearing of any kind.
- Summary forfeiture, a forfeiture to the state of property without giving the owner opportunity to be heard.
- Summary execution, an execution in which a person is accused of a crime and then immediately killed without benefit of a full and fair trial. This is similar to extrajudicial killing, except with the pretense of a trial, such as a kangaroo court.
- Summary judgment
  1. A judgment in a summary proceeding, as one rendered pursuant to statute against the sureties on a bond furnished in an action. A judgment in certain actions specified in the statute providing the remedy, rendered upon plaintiff's motion, usually with supporting affidavits, upon the failure of the defendant to controvert the motion by filing an affidavit of defense or his failure to file an affidavit of defense or affidavit of merits sufficient to show the existence of a genuine issue of fact.
  2. A motion for summary judgment is not a trial; on the contrary it assumes that scrutiny of the facts will disclose that the issues presented by the pleadings need not be tried because they are so patently insubstantial as not to be genuine issues at all. Consequently, as soon as it appears upon such a motion that there is really something to "try," the judge must at once deny it and let the cause take its course in the usual way.
- Summary jurisdiction, a jurisdiction exercised by summary proceedings, as in a bankruptcy court.
- Summary jury trial, an alternative dispute resolution technique, increasingly being used in civil disputes in the United States.
- Summary offence, a crime in some common law jurisdictions that can be proceeded against summarily, without the right to a jury trial and/or indictment. Typically minor or petty offenses.
- Summary order, a decision without an opinion explaining the decision.
- Summary possessory proceeding (summary process), a proceeding, summary in character, to which a landlord may resort for the recovery or possession of leased premises when he becomes entitled to possession.
- Summary proceeding.
  1. A proceeding by which a controversy is settled, case disposed of, or trial conducted in a prompt, simple manner without the aid of a jury and without observance of requirements which prevail in a plenary action in reference to commencement of action, service of papers, etc. A proceeding in the Bankruptcy Court upon petition and answer at a day set for hearing upon notice or order to show cause against the relief proposed. A proceeding before an administrative body, requiring notice and hearing, but not requiring a full compliance with the rules governing trials of civil actions.
  2. Summary proceedings are not conducted without proper investigation of the facts, or without notice, or an opportunity to be heard by the person alleged to have committed the acts, or whose property is sought to be affected. The term summary proceedings is also applied to proceedings which are taken lawfully, but without resort to the courts, such as the physical abatement of a nuisance, or the recaption of goods.
- Summary trial, a trial of a person on a criminal charge, without a jury, that is, a bench trial, or a trial in a summary proceeding.

== See also ==
- Closing argument
- List of legal terms
