= Murders of Aldo Donegani and Luisa De Leo =

2005 double homicide case in Italy

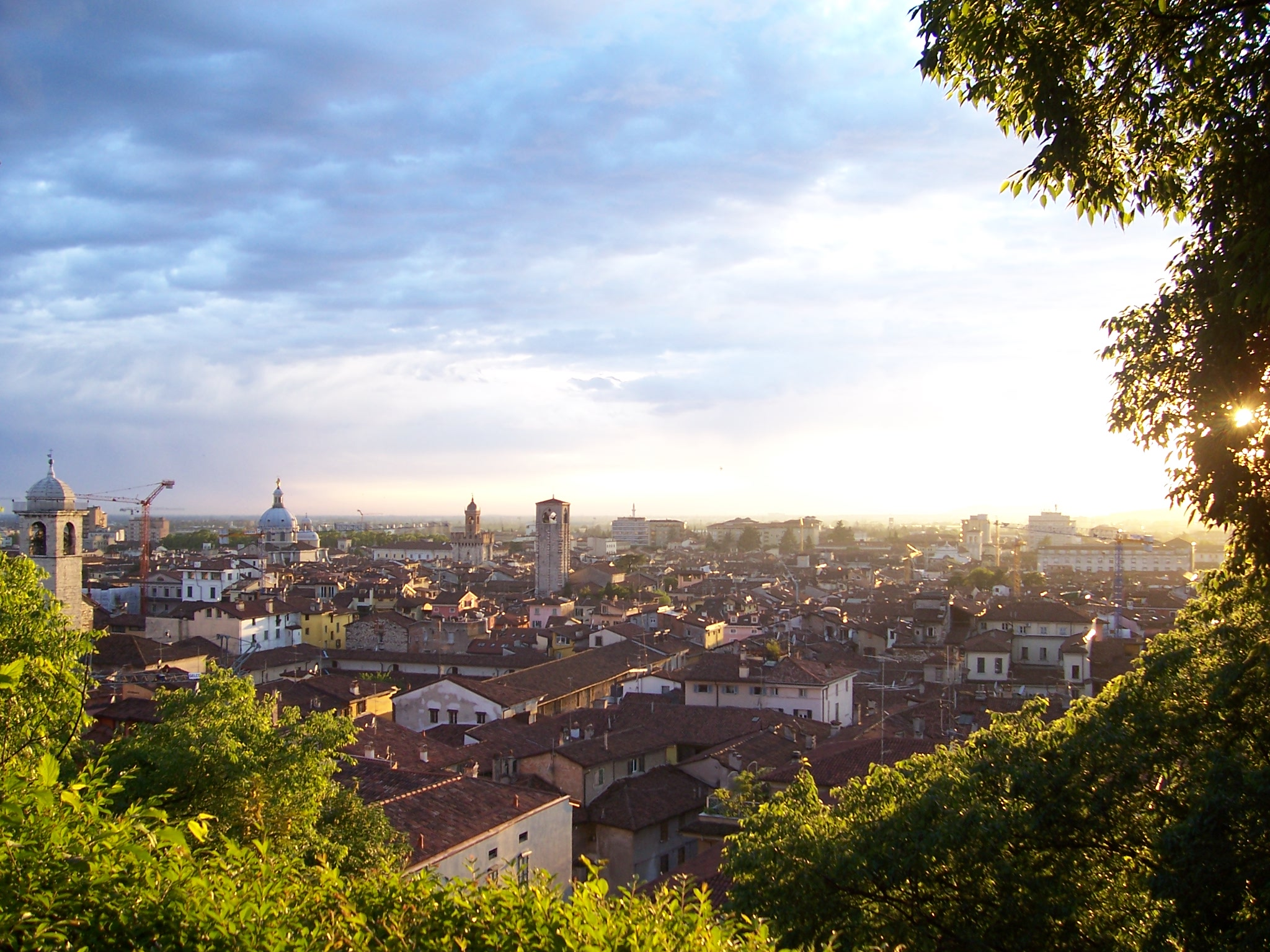
- Brescia, Italy
- Native name: Omicidio dei coniugi Donegani
- Location: 45.556563°N 10.190517°W; Brescia, Italy
- Date: Between 30 July and 17 August 2005
- Attack type: Premeditated multiple homicide, contempt and concealment of a corpse
- Deaths: 2
- Victims: Aldo Donegani, Luisa De Leo
- Perpetrator: Guglielmo Gatti

The murders of Aldo Donegani and Luisa De Leo, known in Italian as the Omicidio dei coniugi Donegani (English: Murder of the Donegani couple), is a notorious double homicide case in Italy. It occurred in the summer of 2005, and had started with the disappearance of the elderly couple 77-year-old Aldo Donegani and his wife 61-year-old Luisa De Leo.

The couple disappeared from their hometown of Brescia in Lombardy, on 1 August 2005 and were missing for over two weeks until the discovery of remains. Their bodies were found cut into pieces and stuffed into garbage bags in a remote wooded area in Val Paisco, on the border between the provinces of Bergamo and Brescia, on 17 August 2005. The heads, which were missing from the bodies, were found a year later, that of the husband on 4 February 2006 and that of the wife on the following 16 November. In both cases the discoveries were made in the woods around the municipality of Provaglio d'Iseo.

The investigations focused on one of the couple's nephews, Guglielmo Gatti, who lived in the same house as his aunt and uncle. He was arrested the same day the bodies were found and immediately professed his innocence. Gatti was sent to trial on the basis of various clues and testimonies, and was sentenced to life imprisonment when the trial concluded in 2009. Despite the conviction, the motive has never been clarified.

== Events ==
=== Background ===
Aldo Donegani and Luisa De Leo were retirees. They had no children but they had two nephews, one of whom they lived with at their villa in the Oltre Mella area of Brescia.

=== The disappearance ===
On 1 August 2005, Corporal Luciano De Leo, a 35-year-old carabiniere serving at the Castelfidardo station in the province of Ancona, went to the home of his uncle and aunt, Aldo Donegani and Luisa De Leo, who had invited him to spend a few days of vacation with them. At midday, he rang the doorbell of the family home, a two-story 1960s villa located at number 15 of Via Ugolino Ugolini, but received no answer. Worried, De Leo rang the bell on the upper floor apartment, where another nephew of the couple, Guglielmo Gatti, lived alone. He was also not home, and a note had been left on the intercom saying "I'll be back after 5 pm". Guglielmo Gatti was a 41-year-old unemployed man, described as a shy, solitary and reserved character, who had been an engineering student at the Milan Polytechnic for some time. When eventually reached by telephone, Gatti said he did not know what could have happened and that he had not seen his uncle for a few days. Shortly thereafter he returned to the villa and, together with De Leo, tried to open the door of the downstairs Donegani apartment, which however was locked. After having tried in vain to make contact with the couple via mobile phone, which was disconnected, the two alerted the fire brigade. They arrived and broke into the ground floor apartment. There was nobody inside and everything seemed perfectly in order with no missing objects. Likewise, in the garage there were the Renault Clio car and the bicycles used by the couple.

Gatti and De Leo then went to the Brescia-San Faustino Carabinieri station, where they filed a missing persons report, thus starting the investigation. The investigators, led by deputy prosecutor Claudia Moregola, determined that the couple's disappearance must have dated back to Sunday 31 July at the earliest. This was the date on which the last confirmed eyewitness accounts of their presence in the city. Their last engagement was their attendance at mass at the parish church of Sant'Antonio on Via Degli Antegnati. Their neighbours and shopkeepers had seen them for the last time the day before, Saturday 30 July. This was the same for their nephew Luciano, who had spoken to them on the phone at 11:39 on that date. To those who had spoken to them, the couple had said that they were expecting visitors and that they had some appointments scheduled for the coming week, suggesting foul play was involved in their disappearance.

=== The investigations ===
The idea of a voluntary departure, although corroborated by some details (the absence of the main set of keys to the house, and the testimony of a family friend who claimed that they'd mentioned something about it), was in contrast with the presence in the house of both the car and bicycles, and perishable foods (leftover sauce and pasta in the oven, various pots of yogurt in the refrigerator), and also in light of the fact that the spouses had recently returned from their usual holiday in San Benedetto del Tronto. It was therefore assumed that the two could have had some accident while on a short excursion. The road they lived on was in fact not far from various cycle routes/pedestrian paths that led to the countryside and hills of the Brescia hinterland, and the Doneganis were regular visitors to the surrounding area. Furthermore, a second house in Aprica which was registered to their nephew Guglielmo Gatti, was another place where they could have gone to. This was because it was where with they were planning to visit with their other nephew, Luciano De Leo, in early August. He, however, claimed this hypothesis as impossible. The searches in this direction (also in the rivers and by dredging the Fantasina pond) gave no results.

The other lead followed by authorities suggested the scenario of a criminal act, a hypothesis for which it was difficult to identify a plausible motive. Since nothing valuable was missing from the house and the couple were not particularly affluent, robbery seemed an unlikely motive. Donegani was a former metalworker and De Leo was a housewife. An examination of their bank accounts did not reveal any suspicious activity. Furthermore, the couple had many friends and were generally very well-liked in their community.

Unbeknownst to most, Donegani was a collector of firearms. The weapons that were found in the villa were all properly declared to the authorities and analysis did not show any recent use. However, further investigations revealed that not all the guns in the collection were accounted for. Three pistols were missing, which had been reported to the authorities in 1975, but it was thought that the guns had probably been sold to third parties in the years since, without informing the relevant authorities.

From the very beginning, the investigators repeatedly and at length questioned Guglielmo Gatti, who displayed a calm and measured attitude, reiterating both to them and to the journalists who were following the story that he could not explain the disappearance of his aunt and uncle. The police also began an intensive search of the villa. The presence of the couple's clothes, identity cards and the camera used by the couple on holiday was found, excluding the theory of an unexpected vacation. Also found at the villa was their missing mobile phone, which had been switched off. After searching the villa, nothing was found that was decisive for the missing persons investigation.

=== The discovery of the bodies ===
Around mid-August 2005, a resident of Corteno Golgi, a municipality in Val Camonica, informed the Carabinieri that on 1 August, around 3:30 pm, while he was in the car with his 14-year-old son on the road to the Vivione Pass, a blue Fiat Punto (the same model owned by Guglielmo Gatti) coming in the opposite direction had grazed their car at high speed, risking causing an accident. The boy, in particular, recognised the driver as the Doneganis' nephew, stating that he had seen him pale, sweaty and out of breath.

The searches were then intensified in the area and on 17 August, during a reconnaissance tour, some men from the State Forestry Corps and the Alpine Rescue were searching the slope of a valley about 400 metres deep in Val Paisco (a side valley of Val Camonica, between the Bergamo and Brescia areas), not far from Vivione. They found were about ten rubbish bags, inside which were the dismembered remains of two bodies in an advanced state of decomposition. Not far away, some blood-stained shears and some shopping bags compatible with the purchases made by the couple before disappearing were found.

As soon as the bodies, from which the heads were missing (found elsewhere several months later by mushroom hunters), were identified as belonging to the missing couple, the Public Prosecutor's Office of Brescia placed Guglielmo Gatti under investigation for premeditated double homicide, vilification and concealment of a corpse, ordering his immediate precautionary custody in prison.

The heads were discovered in 2006.

=== The judicial process ===
Some elements of the case and the collection of evidence pushed the attention onto their nephew Guglielmo Gatti. In addition to the testimony of the driver and his son along the Vivione pass, a neighbour of the Doneganis said she had heard suspicious noises on the night of July 30-31. She said that she had looked outside and seen Guglielmo Gatti in the garden, who had reassured her. A hotelier from Breno, also in Val Camonica, stated that she had given Gatti a room the following night, but that she had not officially registered him since he had arrived very late at night and then left very early in the morning. In Gatti's apartment, on the upper floor of the property at via Ugolini, the receipt for the shopping done by his uncle on Saturday was also found. A new inspection of the villa, carried out with the aid of luminol, highlighted large traces of blood in the garage which had been cleaned up to a height of one metre from the ground. As Gatti used this garage, it led to the belief that the room had been the actual scene of the crime, and blood residue was also found in the car and on one of Gatti's shoes. The cousins on the maternal side of the family had also said that, on the day the disappearance was reported, a strong smell of bleach could be sensed in the garage. The investigators reconstructed the sequence of events as follows: Around midday on Saturday 30 July, Gatti poisoned his uncle and aunt, or at least administered them a narcotic, then transported them to the garage and there dissected them (perhaps before they were even clinically dead) with shears. Once the dismemberment had taken place and the blood was cleaned from the room, the next day he loaded the remains into the car and headed towards the Vivione Pass to get rid of them, stopping to sleep at a hotel in Breno. On 1 August he stopped at a car wash to clean the car, then returned to Brescia, receiving a phone call from Luciano De Leo.

For his part, Gatti declared himself innocent and the victim of an attempt to "frame" him, denying having ever been in Val Camonica in the days in question. He was supported in this by his own family. This was backed up by some newspapers which highlighted the presence of inconsistencies and gaps in the prosecutions case.

The defence, represented by the lawyer Luca Broli, requested an immediate trial: the trial opened in mid-2006 before the Assize Court of Brescia and on 16 May 2007 Guglielmo Gatti was found guilty and sentenced to life imprisonment with three years of daytime isolation. The sentence was confirmed on appeal on 20 June, 2008, and finally by the Supreme Court on 12 February, 2009. In the reasons, although it was not possible to identify a certain motive, the judges hypothesized that Gatti could have vented in the crime the rancour and envy accumulated towards the varied and active existence of his uncles and flatmates, especially in comparison with his monotonous and solitary life.

== After the trial ==
Although he has never stopped professing his innocence, Guglielmo Gatti (who is serving a life sentence in the Opera prison, dedicating himself mostly to studying and managing the prison's internal library) has refused over the years his lawyers' proposals to request a review of the trial. In 2019 he actually asked to be able to access the pardon, but the request was rejected. In 2021 he took advantage of some benefits to the prison regime for the first time.

Since the sentence excluded Gatti from the possibility of inheriting from his uncle, the villa in via Ugolini in Brescia entered a "limbo," since for several years it was not clear whether it had passed to the De Leo family or to the State Property Agency. It thus remained substantially uninhabited for over 11 years, despite some attempts to sell it at auction to collect at least part of the compensation that the nephew had been sentenced to pay to the rest of the family.

In 2016 the building was also subject to an illegal occupation perpetrated by some associations and social centres, which had a family evicted from council houses settle on the raised ground floor. The intrusion ended after a few days when the gas, electricity, and water utilities to the house were disconnected. Eight people were sent to trial on charges of aggravated illegal occupation, damage, and meeting without notice to the Police Chief; the trial ended in 2023 with the acquittal of six defendants for not having committed the crime, while the statute of limitations expired for the other two defendants.

The complete transfer of the property to third parties was finally completed in 2017 and in 2023 the residence underwent a significant renovation.

== Bibliography ==
- Di Giovacchino, Rita (2007). Delitti privati. Trent'anni di omicidi in famiglia: da Maso a Erika e Omar, dai Carretta a Tullio Brigida, dal piccolo Tommy alla strage di Erba. Rome: Fazi Editore. ISBN 978-88-8112-762-7.
- Enzo Biagi (2006). Quello che non si doveva dire. Milan: Rizzoli. ISBN 88-486-0364-5.
