= Murder of Tommaso Onofri =

2006 kidnapping and murder in Parma, Italy

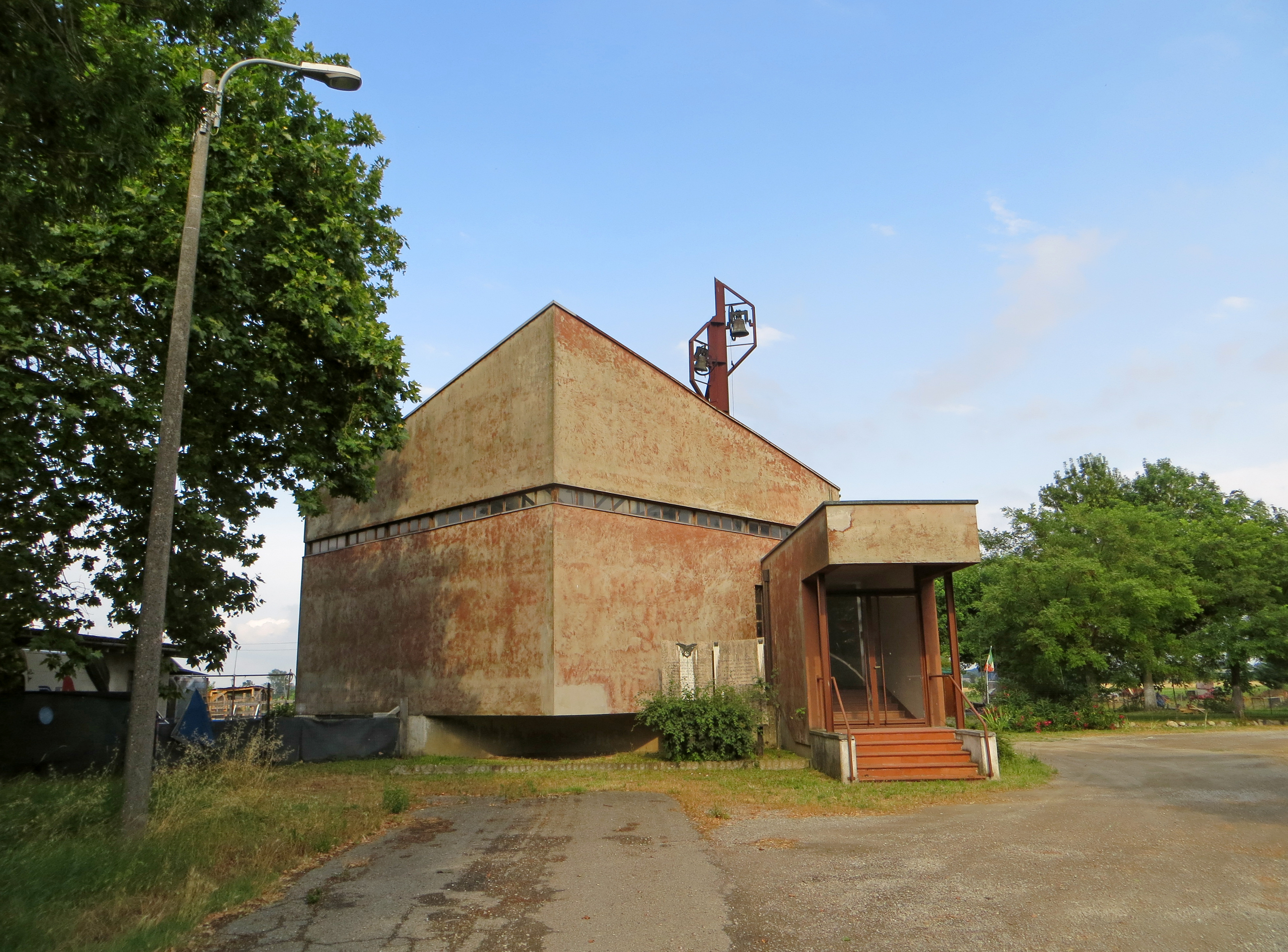
- Church of St. Peter, Casalbaroncolo
- Location: Parma, Italy
- Date: 2 March 2006; 7:45 PM – 7:55 PM (CET)
- Attack type: Kidnapping, robbery and murder
- Victim: Thomas Onofri
- Perpetrators: Mario Alessi, Antonella Conserva, Salvatore Raimondi
- Motive: Probable extortion purpose

The murder of Tommaso Onofri is a crime that occurred on 2 March 2006 in Casalbaroncolo, a hamlet in the municipality of the Parma, Italy. Tommaso Onofri, a 16-month old baby, was kidnapped from his family home in order to obtain a ransom, in the mistaken belief that his parents had access to significant economic resources; however, the kidnappers killed the child a few minutes after the kidnapping, likely fearing that they were already being hunted by law enforcement. The brutality of the crime was reported across Italy and internationally.

The true nature of the crime emerged about a month later, when bricklayer Mario Alessi, who had previously worked at the Onofri house, and his accomplice Salvatore Raimondi, confessed to the crime and indicated to police the place where the body had been hidden. Together with Alessi and Raimondi, the bricklayer's partner, Antonella Conserva, was also sentenced.

== History ==
=== Crime ===
In September 2005, the Onofri family (composed of the spouses Paolo Onofri and Paola Pellinghelli, aged 46 and 43, employed at the Italian Post Office, and their children Sebastiano, aged 8, and Tommaso, aged 17 months) left their apartment on the outskirts of Parma to move into a renovated farmhouse at number 27 in the rural hamlet of Casalbaroncolo, on the border with Sorbolo.

At around 7.45 pm on 2 March 2006, the electricity went out in the farmhouse. The family were sat down eating dinner. After five minutes Paolo Onofri went out into the courtyard to check the electric meter and was attacked by two men with their faces covered by helmets and balaclavas, who threatened him with knives and pistols and forced the door to be opened. Once inside, they shouted robbery, pointing the gun at Tommaso and ordering the couple to hand over the money. Paola gave them her wallet with 150 euros in cash, after which the two assailants made the parents and their eldest son, Sebastiano, lie down on the floor, tying them up and gagging them roughly with packing tape. After around ten minutes, the perpetrators fled, and when the Onofris managed to free themselves, they saw that Tommaso was no longer in his high chair.

The alarm was immediately raised with the police; the parents told the investigators that the two criminals were short and spoke with a marked southern accent, perhaps Calabrese or Sicilian. Their son Sebastiano, also questioned in a protected hearing, said that before the break-in no noise had been heard coming from outside the house and that the two kidnappers had brought a lot of dirt into the house; he also highlighted the different attitude of the two, the man with the helmet was calm, while the one with the balaclava was agitated and brutal in his manner. The searches around the town began immediately, but there was no trace of the child.

=== Investigations ===
The investigations were entrusted to deputy public prosecutors Lucia Musti and Silverio Piro. A file was also opened at the Bologna district anti-mafia office. The case of the disappearance immediately became the focus of the Italian media. On the very night of 2 March the first reports were made and the following day various television crews and correspondents from the major newspapers arrived in Casalbaroncolo. At the same time various actions of solidarity were promoted towards the little boy's family and various appeals were made to the kidnappers to free the child. They started with those launched on 3 March from the stage of the Ariston theatre in Sanremo by Sanremo Music Festival host Giorgio Panariello, on 7 March by Pope Benedict XVI, and on 9 March by the wife of the President of the Italian Republic Franca Ciampi.

On 4 March 2006, the magistrate Gerardo Laguardia declared to TG1 that the family had not yet received any news from the kidnappers. The same report broadcast a public appeal to the kidnappers by the parents, who said they were willing to negotiate to bring their son home safe and sound, pointing out that Tommaso suffered from epilepsy and therefore had to take Tegretol twice a day in precise dosages, in addition to having had a fever in the days preceding the kidnapping and therefore requiring Tachipirina. The declaration was also supported by the priest Don Giacomo Spini, who had baptized the child on 2 April 2005 and married the couple three years earlier, who made himself available to act as an intermediary with the kidnappers. The educational priest Antonio Mazzeoit also came forward with the same intention, but the Onofri family refused.

The investigations were complicated by the continuing lack of evidence from the kidnappers, despite the fact that the Prosecutor's Office had issued 250 orders for telephone and environmental interceptions, and by the difficulty in identifying a possible motive. In fact, in the previous months, some robberies had taken place in the area around Casalbaroncolo, but apart from the theft and the assault on the homeowners, none of them had gone as far as such a brazen act as kidnapping a child. Moreover, apart from the 150 euros spontaneously handed over by Paola Pellinghelli, no other valuables had been stolen from the farmhouse; however, the Onofris were not well-off, they had recently taken out a mortgage to purchase the property in Casalbaroncolo and it seemed unlikely that anyone would ask them for a ransom, if not for the mistaken belief that their work at the Post Office (in particular that of their father Paolo, who was director of the Parma Sud Montebello post office) put them in a position to draw on the funds of the postal institution. The police actually received some requests for money, but none of them were found to be truthful. Further critical issues arose from media pressure: on 8 March, the magistrates following the case had to ask for three days of silence in the press. This was done to avoid misdirection, such as the one that occurred when the Rai 3 programme Chi l'ha visto? received a false report of the discovery on the riverbed of clothes and medicines mendaciously identified as belonging to the child.

A revengeful action was also hypothesized, with reference to alleged conflicts with colleagues at the workplace, to a robbery perpetrated in 2001 in the post office where Paola Pellinghelli worked. Another hypothesis was even linked to the previous marriage of Paolo Onofri, which had ended in 1993 and from which a son was born. It emerged that his ex-wife had been having an affair with an inmate in the Vigevano prison that was suspected of voluntary homicide and this aroused some investigative interest. The investigators also evaluated other clues, such as a footprint left in the mud near the farmhouse and the disappearance of the family dog, which occurred two days before the kidnapping. None of these elements led to concrete results. As for the pet dog, it was found not far from Casalbaroncolo on 22 March.

While the searches continued on without results, the Milanese psychic Costantina Comotari also intervened. She stated that the child had been killed and that the body had been thrown into the waters of the Magra river, near Pontremoli in the Province of Massa-Carrara, almost 100 km from Casalbaroncolo. On 16 March, the divers of the Livorno Fire Brigade inspected the area indicated by the psychic, but the search was unsuccessful. She was later investigated for forgery in relation to the incident. Many other mediums contacted the investigators to give their "solution" to the case; among them there was also Maria Rosa Busi, who had become famous in the previous months for having given a decisive contribution to the finding of another missing person, who instead took the opposite view that Tommaso was still alive. On 26 March, a painted sign appeared on a road near the Onofri house bearing the words "Have you had enough?", which was interpreted by some as a message from the kidnappers and was immediately erased.

==== Suspicions about Paolo Onofri and the bricklayers ====
The only lead that seemed promising was the spontaneous declaration of Pasquale Gagliostro. He was a former member of the Parrello clan of the 'Ndrangheta and a collaborator of justice, who had been recently released from prison. He stated that in August 2005, he had met in a restaurant in San Prospero Parmense, with a fellow countryman who had proposed that he take part in the "lightning kidnapping" of a young child. The target was the son of two postal workers, who would then have been made to pay a ransom using Poste Italiane money, hopefully within a few hours. Gagliostro, who said he did not remember the name of the person who made the proposal to him, refused to take part.

In parallel, the Public Prosecutor's Office began to question the bricklayers who had worked on the renovation of the Casalbaroncolo property, starting with the master builder Pasquale Giuseppe Barbera, who had already had business dealings with Paolo Onofri. He said that he had not noticed any disagreements between the owners and the workers during the works, and provided the investigators with a list of the workers employed on the building site. The hearings of the parents also continued, causing the ire of Tommaso's father, who said he felt "under accusation". A report by a manager of the Parma flying squad then openly questioned the veracity of what the Onofris had stated and hypothesized that in reality the story of the kidnapping concealed an infanticide that had occurred in the family. The total coincidence and non-contradiction of the accounts of the spouses and their son, Sebastiano, went on to refute this investigative hypothesis.

Further elements considered interesting came from the wiretaps on Barbera's telephone numbers, in particular a phone call between him and Paolo Onofri, in which phrases such as "they know something about me" and "I didn't say anything" were uttered. Another one was between Barbera's wife and Mario Alessi, a 44-year-old bricklayer who had participated in the renovation work at Onofri's house. Speaking to him and his partner, Antonella Conserva, she gave him an account of a search of the house by the police. Barbera, summoned again by the investigators, said that Alessi had involved him in a complex money laundering operation worth 70 million US dollars, obtained from the sale of contraband oil, and that together they had proposed to Paolo Onofri to enter the "system" in exchange for the cancellation of the amount to be paid for the renovation work on the house: the principals (defined as "a gang of Slavs") had considered Barbera and Alessi's commitment unsatisfactory, threatening them with reprisals against them and their families, so Onofri's phone call was used to obtain reassurances that he was not involved in this risk.

On 10 March, an inspection was carried out in a warehouse in Parma owned by Paolo Onofri, where an old computer was found, in whose memory were found various files containing child pornography images and videos downloaded from the Internet. Following the discovery, the father of the kidnapped child was entered in the register of suspects, with the hypothesis that Tommaso's kidnapping could have paedophilic implications, but the investigation did not reveal any connection between the events; the proceedings continued separately and ended with a plea bargain of a sentence of 6 months in prison. Tommaso's father initially declared that he had carried out anti-paedophilia research and that he had kept the material in order to file a complaint with the authorities. Later, in an interview with Panorama, he retracted this version, defining the detention of the incriminating material as "a mistake" that he regretted.

=== Discovery of the murder ===
Attention then focused on bricklayer Mario Alessi, who had a criminal record for sexual violence committed with an accomplice in San Biagio Platani in 2000, which had cost him a 6-year prison sentence; the related trial had not yet been concluded. Alessi, who had already been heard by investigators regarding the "gang of Slavs" described by Barbera (and had denied everything, raising the suspicion that the master builder had invented the story for the sole purpose of asking for money from third parties), had shown himself to be in clear solidarity with the Onofris, himself making public appeals for the child's release. Registered in the register of suspects on 27 March, he presented as an alibi first the appointment with a fellow bricklayer, then his presence in a bar in Casaltone on the evening of the kidnapping; neither circumstance was confirmed. In addition, the investigators had caught him burning something in the garden of his house and Paola Pellinghelli, when she met him at the police station, said she was convinced that she had recognized his walk as similar to that of one of the kidnappers. Even the two alibis presented by Pasquale Barbera (refereeing a soccer match and being present at a meeting of Jehovah's Witnesses) were not confirmed.

The investigations carried out by the Reparto Investigazioni Scientifiche (RIS) of Parma had, in the meantime, revealed the presence of a fingerprint on the adhesive tape used to immobilize the family members. Paola Pellinghelli had also said that during the attack, one of the kidnappers had taken off a glove to better grasp the edge of the adhesive. The fingerprint was found by AFIS to belong to Salvatore Raimondi, a 27-year-old ex-boxer, a casual worker and also a criminal. It was discovered that he had acquired telephone numbers with fictitious names, from which he had repeatedly contacted Alessi during the days of Tommaso's kidnapping. On 1 April, Alessi, Raimondi, Barbera and Antonella Conserva were placed under arrest. After a few hours of interrogation, at 7.39 pm, Raimondi was the first to confess and admit to killing the child, but he blamed Alessi. Alessi, in turn, confirmed that Tommaso had been killed, but placed the blame for the murder on Raimondi. In a few minutes, the confessions had reached journalists, and it was publicised at the beginning of the evening news. The Onofri family thus learned of it even before being officially contacted by the investigator. On the evening of 2 April, Mario Alessi led the investigators and the Fire Brigade to San Prospero Parmense, on the banks of the Enza river, where the child's body had been hidden. The body was found intact, buried under a few centimetres of earth and debris. The autopsy placed the death on the same night as the kidnapping. The body showed signs compatible with strangulation, as well as repeated blows to the head inflicted with a flat object, a shovel or a spade.

The bricklayer later declared that he had planned Tommaso's kidnapping with the intention of asking his parents for a large ransom, which would have been used to pay off some debts. During the renovation work on the farmhouse, he had in fact learnt that Paolo Onofri had shown Pasquale Barbera a considerable amount of money that he had recently inherited from a relative. Alessi had thus convinced himself that this meant the family had ample financial resources. He also assumed that it would be easy for them to access further funds through their employer at the Post Office; however, events had taken a turn for the worse within twenty minutes of the kidnapping. Alessi confirmed that the child had been killed because he was crying and "being a nuisance", as well as because of the kidnappers' fear of already being hunted down by the police. Raimondi reported that he had been involved with the promise of obtaining a large part of the ransom and with the lie that the Onofri family was somehow "consenting" to the kidnapping. Antonella Conserva, the only suspect to proclaim her complete innocence, was instead identified as the designated "jailer" of the child during the kidnapping, as well as (following the discovery in Alessi's house of a map of the Casalbaroncolo area) as an active participant in the events of the night of 2 March. In fact, she was supposed to be the one to wait for the two kidnappers in an agreed place, probably somewhere between Strada di Beneceto and Strada del Traglione, on board the Fiat Tipo registered to her partner, so as to continue the escape towards a nearby ruined building.

=== Trials ===
The trial began in March 2007. During the hearing, the defence of Mario Alessi and Salvatore Raimondi (the latter admitted to the summary judgment) placed the blame for Tommaso's killing on each other. Together with the two of them and Antonella Conserva (who continued to say she was completely unaware of the affair, with her defence maintaining that the crime had third party instigators and was of a paedophilic nature), Pasquale Giuseppe Barbera was also sent to trial with the abbreviated trial on charges of aiding and abetting but was released from prison. The first instance sentences saw Mario Alessi sentenced to life imprisonment, Antonella Conserva to twenty-four years of imprisonment and Salvatore Raimondi to twenty; Pasquale Barbera was instead acquitted. In 2010, the Supreme Court of Cassation definitively confirmed the sentences of Alessi, as well as of Raimondi, while for Conserva it was necessary to re-hold the appeal trial, after which in 2012 the Supreme Court also validated her sentence.

The reasons for the first-instance verdict attributed responsibility for the crime to both Mario Alessi and Salvatore Raimondi, while the two accused each other, irreconcilably, of having committed the murder (committed with cruelty and "without giving room for control, logic and above all a sense of human pity") and of having abandoned the accomplice before this happened. The former boxer's statements were certainly considered truthful with regard to the preparation of the crime: it was he who found the "safe" phone cards that would have been used to ask for the ransom, as well as procuring the helmet, balaclava and weapons to use to enter the Onofri house and (once Tommaso had been killed) to get rid of the clothes used during the "raid". Confirming the mendacity of the subsequent statements, the judges highlighted that, if the two had separated without an agreement, Alessi would have had difficulty leaving the Casalbaroncolo area, since Antonella Conserva had probably "missed" the car meeting at the agreed place and time. Furthermore, the fact that the three had waited two days before meeting again was seen by the court as further confirmation of the full awareness of all of them regarding the crime committed. The first instance judges therefore did not consider the order of 13 May 2006, with which the Bologna Court of Appeal had cleared Raimondi of the charge of complicity in murder (accepting as true the version according to which Alessi, before killing the child, had made his accomplice go away on his moped), leaving standing only the one relating to the kidnapping with the "unwanted" aggravating circumstance of Tommaso's death.

The role of Alessi's partner was also defined as central and fully involved in the criminal action: the judges highlighted on one hand her aptitude (together with the bricklayer) to find "creative" methods to earn money in ways bordering on illegality, on the other they highlighted some of her actions aimed at trying to escape investigations, for example suggesting to her partner what to say in interviews, informing herself on elements not in the public domain at the time (such as the fingerprints found at the crime scene) or even trying to induce the barmaid from Casaltone who denied Alessi's alibi to give false testimony to the investigators.

== Political reactions ==
On the sidelines of the trial, the affair did not fail to become a topic of political debate. In the centre-right coalition, then in government, the leader of the Northern League in the Senate of the Republic Ettore Pirovano went so far as to call for the death penalty for the murderers. This was supported by the then MEP Alessandra Mussolini, who called for a referendum on the issue. The president of the Chamber of Deputies Pier Ferdinando Casini stated that only his "Christian faith" held him back from asking for it. The Minister of Justice Roberto Castelli promptly stigmatized such a prospect. Tommaso's mother herself said she was "always in favour" of capital punishment. In 2022, she retracted this statement, linking it to the pain of the moment.

The former Minister of Communications Maurizio Gasparri asked for a "summary trial", which would result in a life sentence in a few days, a position supported among the opposition by Marco Rizzo of the Party of Italian Communists. The centre-left coalition also sparked controversy over the statement by The Daisy leader Francesco Rutelli, who lashed out against the "exploitation" of the affair, accusing the government of not having "established any more severe norms for those who commit brutal crimes" and of having sunk a bill presented by Giuseppe Fanfani to exclude the most serious crimes from the possibility of accessing the abbreviated procedure; the accusations were rejected with disdain once again by the Minister of Justice Castelli and by the exponents of Forza Italia, such as Fabrizio Cicchitto and Sandro Bondi. The trial excluded any element that linked the crime to ulterior motives (Satanism or paedophilia) or to organised crime circles. In 2019, Paola Pellinghelli declared to the press that she was fully convinced that all the guilty parties had been brought to justice, stating that the investigations had highlighted how even the 'Ndrangheta circles had reduced their criminal activities to facilitate the search for her son.

=== Subsequent events ===
The funeral of Tommaso Onofri (after a brief display of the coffin in the chapel of rest in the "new" church of Sant'Andrea Apostolo in Antognano) was officiated on 8 April 2006 in the Cathedral of Parma, celebrated by the bishop Mons. Silvio Cesare Bonicelli (who read a message sent by Pope Benedict XVI), in the presence of approximately 50,000 people. The president of the Chamber of Deputies Pier Ferdinando Casini and the minister of infrastructure Pietro Lunardi spoke on behalf of the government; with them also the major regional, provincial and municipal authorities. At the end of the rite, the body was buried in the cemetery of Tizzano Val Parma.

Affected by serious heart problems, Paolo Onofri was deeply devastated by the killing of his son. In 2008, following a heart attack, he fell into a coma and spent the next six years unconscious, hospitalized in a clinic, where he died on 15 January 2014. Alessi, initially detained in the Parma prison, was transferred to the Viterbo prison following threats (and, according to some sources, an attack) from other inmates, where he was also involved in the investigations for the murder of Meredith Kercher, since he declared that he had gathered confidences from Rudy Guede that exonerated Amanda Knox and Raffaele Sollecito. Subsequently he was further transferred to the Prato prison. Antonella Conserva was instead sent to the Bollate prison and Salvatore Raimondi to the Ferrara prison.

Starting in 2013, faced with the prospect that Alessi could benefit from benefits (parole leave and sentence reductions), Tommaso's mother harshly commented on the news, calling for the continuation of the prison sentence for all three convicted of the crime. The criticisms were reiterated when, between 2020 and 2023, Antonella Conserva benefited from the first release permits from the prison where she was being held. Salvatore Raimondi initially chose to renounce the benefits, and in 2013 defined them as unjust in the face of his own crime and disrespectful towards the pain of the Onofri family, limiting himself to asking for a transfer to a prison where he could resume his boxing practice. In August 2024, Raimondi (in the meantime transferred to the Forlì prison and further sentenced to 3 years of imprisonment for extortion against another prisoner) obtained semi-liberty to be able to work. Paola Pellinghelli commented on the circumstance in strongly contrary terms.

== Cultural impact ==
The case inspired Fabri Fibra's 2007 song Potevi essere tu. The Onofri family later wanted to meet the rapper from the Marche region to thank him. An episode of the Rai series Commissari - Sulle tracce del male, an episode of The History Channel programme Delitti and an episode of the podcast Indagini de Il Post were dedicated to the murder.

== Bibliography ==
- Stefano Catellani, Il piccolo Tommy: la verità negli atti d'indagine, intercettazioni, depistaggi, testimonianze, Parma, Battei, 2007. ISBN 978-88-7883-036-3

== Other projects ==
- Chronology of the kidnapping of Tommaso Onofri at Wikinews
- Murder of Tommaso Onofri at Wikiquote
