= 2004 in Italy =

- Decades: 1980s; 1990s; 2000s; 2010s; 2020s
- See also: History of Italy; Timeline of Italian history; List of years in Italy

Events during the year 2004 in Italy.

== Incumbents ==
- President: Carlo Azeglio Ciampi
- Prime Minister: Silvio Berlusconi

== Events ==
- March 6 - Sanremo: Marco Masini wins with the Flying Man at the 54th edition of the Italian Song Festival.
- March 20 - second world day against the war; millions of people take to the streets all over the world, hundreds of thousands in Rome.
- April 13 - in Iraq four Italians were kidnapped. They are Maurizio Agliana, Umberto Cupertino, Fabrizio Quattrocchi and Salvatore Stefio. Quattrocchi l was killed, and the other three were freed after 56 days.
- 8 June - the three Italian hostages and a Pole are released in Iraq during a targeted action.
- 1 September - in the Mazara del Vallo area, a 3 years old girl named Denise Pipitone disappears while playing in the street. the issue will be closed to be reopened in 2021.
- 1–11 September – 61st Venice International Film Festival
- November 25 - the President of the Italian Republic Carlo Azeglio Ciampi grants pardon to Graziano Mesina, known as "Grazianeddu", former red primrose of Sardinian banditry.
- December 7 - after three years of restructuring, the Teatro alla Scala in Milan reopens with the opera L'Europarecognata by Antonio Salieri.
- December 16 - the Italian Creative Commons Licenses are presented in Turin.

== Film ==
- Tre metri sopra il cielo (March 12, 2004)
- Tu la conosci Claudia? (December 16, 2004)
- Christmas in Love (December 17, 2004)
- Volevo solo dormirle addosso (October 15, 2004)
- L'odore del sangue (April 2, 2004)
- Certi bambini (May 14, 2004)
- Che ne sarà di noi (March 5, 2004)
- Non ti muovere (March 12, 2004)
- Agata e la tempesta (February 27, 2004)
- L'amore è eterno finché dura (February 20, 2004)
- Mi piace lavorare (Mobbing) (February 13, 2004)
- La spettatrice (May 7, 2004)
- Dopo mezzanotte (April 23, 2004)
- La rivincita di Natale (January 23, 2004)
- Le chiavi di casa (September 10, 2004)
- Stai con me (June 25, 2004)
- Le conseguenze dell'amore (September 24, 2004)

== Deaths ==
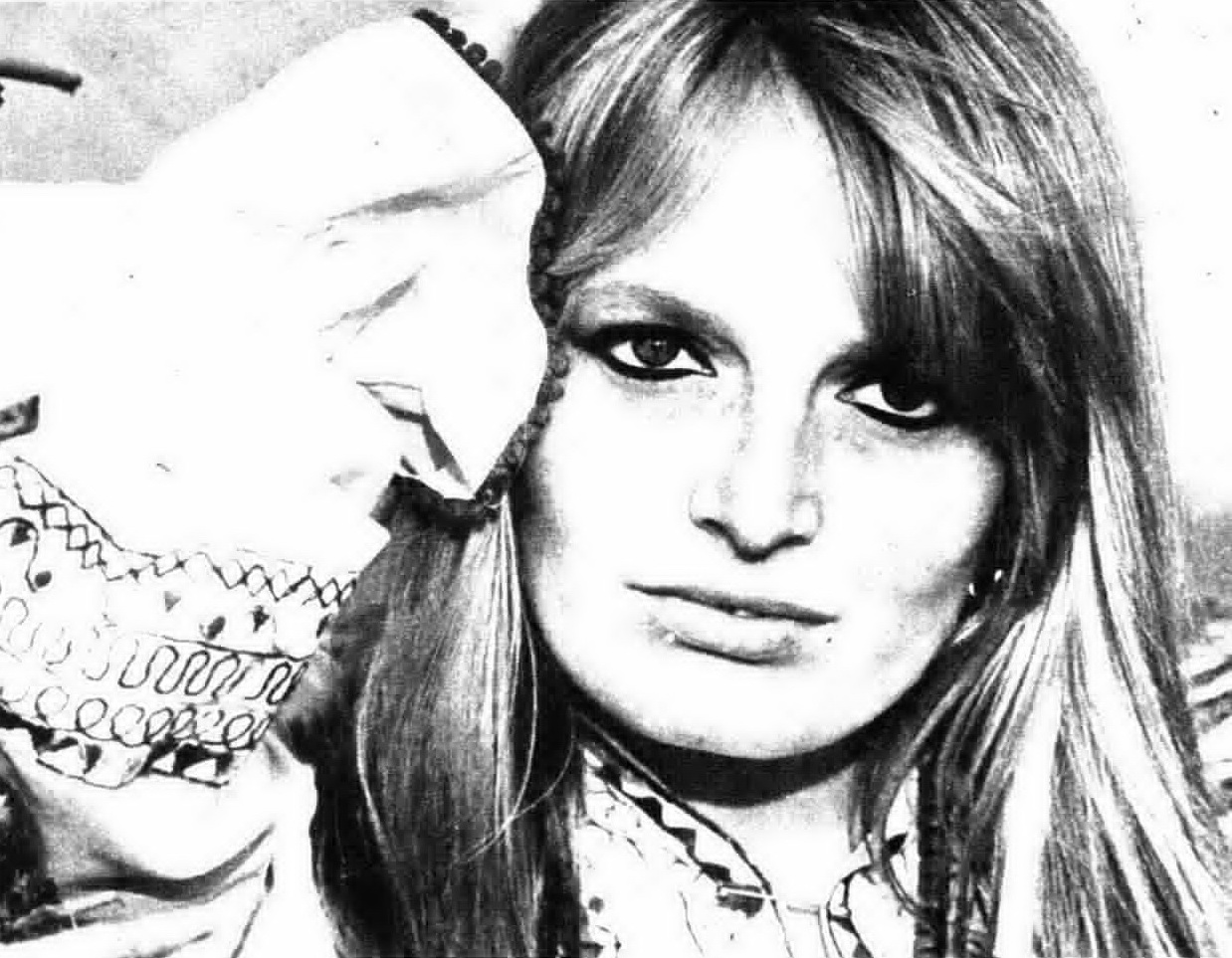
Gabriella Ferri

- 3 April – Gabriella Ferri, singer (b. 1942).
- 27 May – Umberto Agnelli, industrialist, head of Fiat (b. 1934).
- 4 June –

- Nino Manfredi, actor (b. 1921).
- Anthony Steffen, film actor and screenwriter (b. 1930)

- 28 July – Tiziano Terzani, journalist (b. 1938).
- 31 July – Laura Betti, actress (b. 1927).
- 22 August – Reginaldo Polloni, rower (b. 1916).
- 23 August – Francesco Minerva, Roman Catholic archbishop (b. 1904).
- 26 August – Enzo Baldoni, journalist (b. 1948).
- 28 August – Silvana Jachino, actress (b. 1916).
- 12 November – Lelio Marino, Italian-born American entrepreneur (born c. 1935).
- 16 November – Massimo Freccia, Italian-American conductor (b. 1906).
- 14 December – Agostino Straulino, sailor (b. 1914).
- 19 December – Renata Tebaldi, opera singer (b. 1922).
