= Summary jury trial =

Summary jury trial is an alternative dispute resolution technique, increasingly being used in civil disputes in the United States. In essence, a mock trial is held: a jury is selected and, in some cases, presented with the evidence that would be used at a real trial. The parties are required to attend the proceeding and hear the verdict that the jury brings in. After the verdict, the parties are required to once again attempt a settlement before going to a real trial.

== Rationale ==
The theory is that hearing the actual judgment rendered will cause one party or the other to become more amenable to a reasoned settlement. It may also satisfy the desire of one or more of the parties to have their day in court and have their case heard by an impartial jury.

== Procedure ==
The summary jury trial, when ordered by the courts, occurs as a break from regular litigation. The courts have found their power to do this under Rule 16 of the Federal Rules of Civil Procedure. In the normal case, the judge will reach the conclusion that the parties are in a very unrealistic disagreement over the relative merits of the case.

As a reality check, the court will inform the parties of the date and time of the summary jury trial, normally allowing some time for any additional discovery that may seem appropriate. Often, the parties themselves will ask for the summary jury trial as a mechanism to cause the other side to reassess its case. In fact, there are frequent cases in which both parties ask for the summary jury trial.

The summary jury trial takes place after discovery has been substantially completed and pending motions are resolved. A six-member jury is chosen from the ordinary jury panel.

For the summary jury trial, the court will impanel a jury. In some states, such as New York, summary jury trials are agreed to in advanced by the parties involved, as the final resolution of the matter and the verdict rendered is binding, at least with regards to liability. In some instances, damages caps are agreed to by the parties ahead of time as well, and are not disclosed to jurors. In other states, such as Texas, the verdicts of the jurors in summary jury trials are advisory and non-binding. Instead, the verdicts are used as tools in advancing settlement negotiations. In a number of these cases, courts have seated the juries without explaining that their verdicts will be advisory in nature and non-binding. This has the beneficial effect of producing a jury that is as close as possible to being a "real" jury.

The rules of summary jury trials vary from state to state and even from judge to judge, but generally, the evidence that will be presented is agreed to ahead of time, the number of witnesses is strictly limited, and the amount of time allotted to each side, both to present a case and to rebut the opposing side, is also limited. Time restrictions are often strictly adhered to.

== Problems ==
Occasionally, the opposite problem occurs and a party refuses to participate in the summary jury trial process. The response of the courts has varied, depending upon the nature of the case and the reasons for the desire to avoid the summary jury trial process. On the other hand, courts have also allowed parties to refuse participation in the process when it might jeopardize the parties' normal litigation. Since the aim of a summary jury trial is to promote settlement negotiations, there would seem to be little point in dragging a party into a situation in which they might withhold their best efforts and thus bias the verdict brought back.

The process of empanelling a "mock jury" has caused some controversy. In the Hume case, the court flatly denied a request by both parties for a summary jury trial on the grounds that it did not have authority to require citizens to serve on a "mock" jury. Usually, this has not been a problem.

In the eyes of the layperson, the summary jury trial proceeds much like a regular trial. The jury is selected by voir dire without being told that its verdict is non-binding. The clients must attend from the opening statements through summary presentations of evidence and closing arguments. After the verdict, the parties begin an examination of the verdict and the reasons why the jurors reached it. When the parties believe that they understand how their evidence fared in the minds of the jury, they meet and once more attempt to hammer out their differences. Note that at this stage, the proceeding devolves to a rather traditional negotiation session.

== Advantages ==
The major advantages of the summary jury trial are simply the savings for all concerned if it is successful in prompting a settlement. If the parties reach a settlement, they may save time in conducting discovery and presenting motions and, of course, in conducting the trial. And the appeal process is also avoided.

In addition, the summary jury trial is a mechanism for forcing parties to hear what an unbiased jury really thinks of their case. All too often, parties in litigation have occasional communications via attorneys, with little or no outside correction or feedback given on the course of their litigation. In the summary jury trial, either the verdict returned will be a "split the difference" type decision, in which the parties will have been given an outline of a settlement, or the verdict will cause one party to worry about its chances at trial. In that event, that party is likely to be much more receptive to settlement offers from the other side.

== Disadvantages ==
However, there are a number of disadvantages to the summary jury trial. The summary jury trial exposes one party to an earlier "dry run" of the points of the other side. Many disputants may not wish to prejudice their cases in this manner. Also, summary jury trials are not particularly simple; they are quick and cheap only when compared to traditional litigation. By the time the summary trial takes place, the parties have engaged in much discovery and have already incurred many costs.

Another disadvantage of the system is that it affords a "foot dragging party," another opportunity for stalling and delay tactics to wear out the other side. A party that knows it has no real case but refuses to settle will naturally seek every opportunity available to achieve an unexpected success or at least a delay.

In addition, by its nature as a jury centered proceeding, the summary jury trial does not give the parties any useful clues about the outcome of issues of law. If a trial is likely to turn on issues of law, the summary jury trial is of little, if any, value.

There is also a built-in problem with the summary jury trial's nature as an adversarial proceeding. Since it is likely that one party will "win" the summary trial and one party will "lose," the parties may find themselves with a slightly different balance of power after the trial but overall as far apart as ever. The party that "wins" the summary jury trial is unlikely to gain very much motivation to settle and might even become less willing to settle.
