= Erba Massacre =

2006 mass murder in Italy

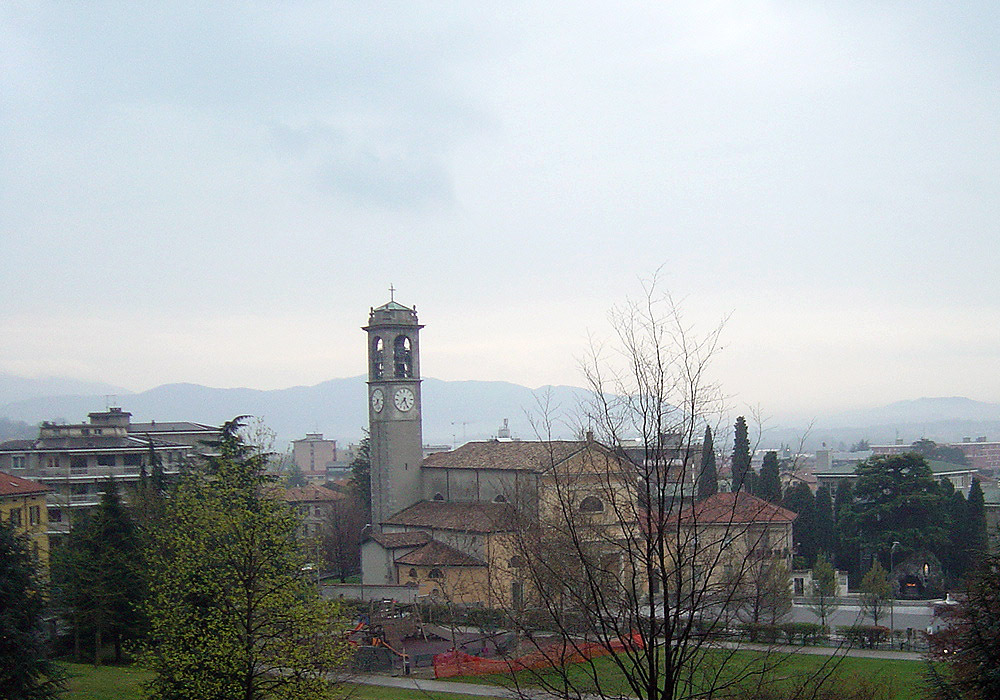
- Erba, Italy
- Location: 25 Via Armando Diaz, Erba, Italy
- Date: 11 December 2006; 8:00 PM approx. – 8:15 PM approx.
- Target: Raffaella Castagna and Youssef Marzouk
- Attack type: Mass murder
- Weapons: Knife and crowbar (not found)
- Deaths: 4
- Injuries: 1
- Victims: Raffaella Castagna, Youssef Marzouk, Paola Galli, Valeria Cherubini
- Perpetrators: Olindo Romano and Rosa Bazzi
- Motive: Disagreements between neighbours

The Erba Massacre (Italian: strage di Erba) is a notorious case of multiple homicide that occurred in Erba, in the province of Como, Italy on 11 December 2006.

The massacre was carried out by the married couple Olindo Romano (born 10 February 1962 in Albaredo per San Marco) and his wife Rosa Angela Bazzi (born 12 September 1963 in Erba). The couple used a knife and crowbar to kill their neighbours Raffaella Castagna (born 21 August 1976 in Erba), her young son Youssef Marzouk (born 9 September 2004 in Erba) and her mother Paola Galli (26 January 1949 in Erba). Also killed was their other neighbour Valeria Cherubini (born 9 August 1951 in Montorfano). Her husband, Mario Frigerio (born 29 June 1941 in Montorfano – died 16 September 2014 in Como) was slashed in the throat and was believed dead by the attackers. He managed to save himself thanks to a congenital malformation of the carotid artery which prevented him from dying from blood loss. The massacre took place at the home of Raffaella Castagna, in a renovated courtyard in the centre of the town. The apartment was set on fire immediately after the crime was committed.

The high profile trial was reported across the country and internationally. BBC News reported the surprise confessions as a "dramatic twist to the murder mystery that gripped Italy".

On 3 May 2011, the Supreme Court of Cassation rejected the appeals, making the appeal sentence definitive which recognised the couple, already sentenced to life imprisonment in the first instance, as the perpetrators of the massacre.

== The crime ==
On the evening of 11 December 2006, at around 8:20 p.m., at number 25 of via Armando Diaz in Erba, a fire broke out inside one of the apartments of one of the buildings that compose it, known as the Ice condominium. Two neighbours, one of whom was a volunteer firefighter, entered the building first to rescue any people trapped inside. Near the landing they found an injured man, sixty-five-year-old Mario Frigerio, and dragged him by the ankles away from the fire. Upon entering the apartment, the rescuers found the lifeless and burning body of Raffaella Castagna, a thirty-year-old part-time employee in a community for the disabled. They managed to carry him to the landing and then tried to assist the injured elderly man.

At a certain point, the rescuers heard a woman's cries for help and Frigerio managed to communicate in a faint voice to the rescuers that his wife was on the upper floor; however, due to the smoke, those present were forced to abandon the building. Subsequently, the firefighters arrived, put out the fire and found three more bodies. They were Paola Galli, a fifty-seven-year-old housewife and mother of Raffaella; Youssef Marzouk, the woman's young son and Valeria Cherubini, Frigerio's fifty-five-year-old wife.

The investigations reported the causes of death as follows. Raffaella Castagna, surprised in the hallway in front of her front door, was repeatedly hit with a crowbar and stabbed twelve times before finally having her throat slit. She died from severe head injuries, including a fractured skull, caused by blows from the crowbar. Her mother Paola Galli was attacked in the hallway of the home and suffered six stab wounds and six crowbar blows (damaging blows to the skull). The youngest victim two-year-old Youssef Marzouk died on the sofa in the living room from blood loss after receiving two stab wounds, one of which was fatal to the throat that severed the carotid artery.

To hide the traces of the crime, the apartment was then set on fire, but the amount smoke that developed inside forced the attackers to flee the apartment towards the condominium stairs from which the Frigerio-Cherubini couple were coming down. They had been attracted to the Castagna apartment by the smoke that was coming out from under the door.

Valeria Cherubini was found in her apartment which was located in the attic of the building. After having rushed to a lower floor, on the condominium stairs she had a prolonged altercation with the attacker and was seriously injured by thirty-four stab wounds and eight blows from a crowbar. However, the injuries were not as damaging as for Castagna and Galli, allowing her to go back upstairs to the upper floor. She was still alive when the first aid arrived brought by the neighbours, and she had tried to attract their attention with calls for help, but the rescuers were unable to intervene due to the smoke rising from the fire downstairs in the Castagna apartment. She then died, together with the family dog, due to the inhalation of carbon monoxide, which had by-then concentrated in her apartment.

Her husband Mario Frigerio was also the victim of an attack on the condominium stairs, being beaten and stabbed in the throat, but managed to survive thanks to a birth defect of his carotid artery which preserved him from fatal bleeding.

The forensic evidence revealed that there had been two attackers, one of whom was left-handed. They were each armed with two short-and long-bladed knives, as well as a crowbar.

== Investigations ==
=== Azouz Marzouk ===
The police investigations initially focused on Azouz Marzouk, a native of Zaghouan, Tunisia, husband of Raffaella Castagna and father of Youssef. Marzouk, who according to the press had a criminal record for drug dealing and had been released from prison thanks to the 2006 pardon. He was in Tunisia visiting his parents at the time of the crime, and after having hastily returned to Italy, he was interrogated by the Carabinieri. The investigators confirmed his alibi and began to suspect that a settling of scores had been carried out against him.

=== Olindo Romano and Rosa Bazzi ===
Among the other leads followed, the anomalous behaviour of two neighbours of Raffaella Castagna, who in the past had legal disputes with the Castagna household, was immediately noted. Despite the disconcerting events that had occurred, already from the first hours after the murders the Romano couple showed themselves disinterested in the events and, unlike the other inhabitants of the courtyard and the condominiums, did not ask for reassurance from the police. These suspicions led the investigators to seize some of the couple's clothing and to put the house and the car under surveillance. Already in the first night after the massacre, other facts attracted the attention of the investigators. Both of them had injuries consistent with a fight (the husband a bruise on the hand and one on the forearm, the wife a wound already healed on a finger). Furthermore, when asked the usual questions immediately after the massacre, the two showed a McDonald's receipt. This was rather suspicious, as it showed an immediate attempt to appear at all costs to be extraneous to the incident, when the police had not asked any questions about it.

The couple were accosted by police on 8 January 2007 and arrested after a long interrogation the following day. They were described as two very closed and isolated people, morbidly attached to each other. During the investigations, some of Rosa Bazzi's relatives claimed that the woman had been sexually abused by an acquaintance (perhaps a relative) at the age of ten, without ever receiving any kind of assistance or support following this. Investigating Olindo Romano's past, however, revealed a complaint filed against him by his father and brother at the beginning of the eighties, following a fight for family reasons. In fact, at the time of their arrest, Romano and Bazzi had already cut off any relationship even with their closest relatives for years; a psychiatrist, a consultant for the defense, later claimed that it was appropriate to evaluate Bazzi's IQ, in order to establish her capacity to understand and want.

Romano was charged with aggravated multiple homicide, his wife with complicity. It was then the RIS findings that indicated the presence of a second person in the massacre, left-handed like Bazzi.

The investigators traced the frequent disagreements between the Romanos and Raffaella Castagna, which also resulted in an argument on New Year's Eve 2005 and in a civil case between the parties. A hearing of which was supposed to take place two days after the massacre. On that occasion, the Romanos allegedly attacked and beat Castagna, who filed a complaint against them for insults and injuries after an argument that broke out that evening, even though she offered to withdraw it in exchange for financial compensation. The episode, however, was only the latest in a long list of hostility and rudeness between the tenants, which frequently resulted in arguments and fights. The spouses reiterated their innocence and declared that they had spent the evening in a McDonald's in Como, for which they also kept the receipt. This time however, was two hours before the massacre, and the usual dinner time of the couple. The investigators immediately suspected a clumsy attempt by the couple to obtain an alibi.

On 10 January 2007, before the magistrates, the Romanos admitted, taking full responsibility separately, to being the perpetrators of the massacre, describing in detail the individual acts, the type of wounds, the positions of the victims' bodies and the type of weapons used. The confession was reiterated during the validation of the arrest by the GIP and the details described were considered decisive since they could only be known by those who had experienced the crime scene. In particular, the initial position of the victims' bodies at the end of the assault (and therefore different from the final position in the photo of the bodies on the landing), later confirmed by scientific investigations, could only have been known by the material perpetrators. The testimony of Mario Frigerio, the only survivor, was also used against them.

== The processes ==
=== Preliminary hearings ===
On 10 October, in front of the Giudice dell'udienza preliminare (GUP) who had to decide whether or not to open the trial, Olindo declared himself innocent and retracted his confession. His wife Rosa also retracted her statements. The relatives of the victims rebelled in the courtroom, and the judge was forced to suspend the session. Azouz Marzouk asked for the death penalty for the two defendants, even though it is not provided for in the Italian legal system. The prosecution, represented by the PM Massimo Astori, considered the Romanos' retractions as a simple variation of the defence strategy.

On 12 October, Olindo Romano and Rosa Bazzi were sent for trial.

=== First degree ===
The first hearing was held on 29 January 2008; during the hearings, the Romanos spent the time exchanging words and giggling with each other, even during the projection in the courtroom of the photographs of the body of little Youssef.

On 18 February 2008, Olindo accused the Carabinieri who had interrogated him of having brainwashed him and convinced him to confess, promising him in exchange a few years in prison and the immediate release of his wife Rosa. During the same days, their neighbours testified before the Court that the Romanos had created a climate of terror in the condominium with furious arguments, verbal threats, throwing vases onto other people's terraces and letters from lawyers. The police even had to intervene several times and several tenants of the building had preferred to move elsewhere to avoid further arguments. A neighbour would later say that, shortly before the massacre, Olindo Romano had given her a mass of handwritten pages containing their version of the arguments with Raffaella Castagna and her family, asking her to type them for him. The defence attempted to argue, without however proving it, that on the same day of the massacre a stranger was present in Raffaella Castagna's home.

==== Testimony of Mario Frigerio ====
While at first, from his hospital bed, Mario Frigerio indicated that his assailant was an unknown person, with an olive complexion, during the proceedings he testified as the only eyewitness, recognising Olindo Romano as his attacker.

In the courtroom, during the trial, tensions arose between the prosecution and the defence, in particular during the cross-examination of Frigerio by the Romano lawyers. After some insistent questions from the defence who attempted to cast doubt on his credibility and to paint him as a false witness, Frigerio turned to them exclaiming "shame on you!" and calling Olindo Romano a "murderer"; the judge then suspended the hearing.

==== Further retractions by Romano ====
On 28 February 2008, Olindo Romano made a second spontaneous statement, insisting on the alleged brainwashing he hypothesized and declaring that he had been "treated like a beast" in the Como prison; he asked not to be separated from his wife. The testimonies of the carabinieri who interrogated him - and confirmed by listening to the recordings made - revealed instead that Olindo and Rosa confessed, telling them that they wanted to free their consciences. His wife, who was also supposed to make statements, declined because, according to her lawyers, she was deeply affected by the accusations made against her by Frigerio. Rosa will speak at the trial, in the following hearing on 3 March 2008: in her deposition she will declare that she confessed after being promised house arrest. She also claimed that she had never gone up to Raffaella Castagna's house and denied having ever had any arguments with her, claiming instead that she had tried to help her when she needed it, a circumstance also denied by some of Castagna's friends, who also reported that Raffaella had told them about being followed by the Romano couple even a few days before the massacre; the couple denied having wanted to follow her, but the prosecution then used this event as proof of the beginning of an escalation of intimidation against Castagna.

On 31 March 2008, the defence, invoking the so-called legitimate suspicion, asked to move the trial away from Como because the local media would have had a hostile attitude towards the defendants. The request was rejected. On 2 April 2008, the first statement of Mario Frigerio was heard in court. Although seriously injured, he accurately described the dynamics of the massacre. It was interpreted as a confirmation of the Romanos' guilt. The defence then asked for the judges to be challenged, claiming that they had prejudicial positions towards the defendants. The trial was suspended again.

On 17 November 2008, the Supreme Court of Cassation rejected the judges' recusal. The trial resumed with the prosecutor's closing statement; the magistrate retraced all the stages of the affair, describing it as a "journey of horror". Evidence against the Romanos was presented, starting with traces of blood with the DNA of one of the victims. At the end of the closing statement, Astori asked for the maximum sentence for the couple: life imprisonment without extenuating circumstances, with three years of solitary confinement. For the prosecutor, the Erba massacre was one of the most atrocious crimes in Italian history.

On 19 November 2008, Olindo made his third spontaneous statement, claiming that up until that point he had been playing the part of the monster, and that this act included the confession given to a psychiatrist and the sentences left on purpose in a Bible in his possession, containing insults and invectives against the victims, declarations of love to his wife and poems. The civil parties asked for a total of €8,000,000 in compensation.

==== Judgement ====
Olindo subsequently released a fourth spontaneous statement, reaffirming his and his wife's innocence and expressing his condolences to the victims' families.

The Court of Assizes of Como issued the first-instance sentence on November 26, 2008: the Romanos were sentenced to life imprisonment with three years of solitary confinement. The Court also established a compensation of €500,000 for the Frigerios, €60,000 for Marzouk and €20,000 for his parents living in Tunisia.

=== Second degree and appeal ===
On 20 April 2010, the Court of Appeal of Milan confirmed the life sentences for the spouses Rosa Bazzi and Olindo Romano, with the additional punitive measure of three years of daytime isolation, the maximum permitted by law.

== Cassation ==
Two appeals were lodged against the sentence, one of which was based on 40 grounds of legitimacy; the Supreme Court presented it as the result of "an operation of vivisection of the trial, so that each single step of the process was considered flawed, sometimes under several aspects". On 3 May 2011 the sentence sanctioned the rejection of the appeals.

The Attorney General at the Court had requested the confirmation of the second instance sentence.

The Supreme Court stated that all the defence arguments must be rejected, since it was not possible to undermine "the solidity of the foundation on which the very painful story had been reconstructed".

In particular:

- the circumstance that the only witness of the massacre, Mario Frigerio, did not immediately recognize Olindo does not constitute — for the Court — a sure and incontrovertible indication of his unreliability, also considering that:

«(...) the territorial Court did not hide at all that in the first part Frigerio had shown difficulty in remembering, had provided confused and contradictory information on the identity of his attacker (moreover never indicated as a subject of North African origin, but rather indicated as a subject with olive complexion, dark eyes, thick black hair), but it fully argued how the witness had plausibly explained his difficulties not so much in bringing to the surface the memory momentarily blurred due to the trauma, but his difficulty in believing that the one who had inveighed against him was Romano, his neighbour who he considered a good person (...) the explanation provided by the witness must be exempt from any censorship of implausibility (...) [since there is] a very solid anchorage that could not admit alternative interpretations to the fact that Frigerio had immediately recognized Romano»

- The circumstance that the only witness of the massacre, Mario Frigerio, did not immediately recognize Olindo does not constitute — for the Court — a sure and incontrovertible indication of his unreliability, also considering that:

«(...) even admitting the suggestive nature of the questions asked by the Carabinieri, the witness both before the public prosecutors and before the judges, always maintained that he had clearly in mind the features of Romano as his aggressor, but that he had hesitated to mention him ab initio, because he wanted to understand how it was possible that an ordinary condominium member, with whom he had never had any disagreements, had attacked him and his wife so brutally. The valorization of this version does not expose the reasoning of the sentence to any serious criticism of illogicality or contradictoriness»

- any complaints about the presence of the blood stain on the Romano couple's car - in particular, about the possibility of "contamination" (in the sense that someone else, who had previously been at the crime scene, could have transported the blood material to the car) and about the lack of scientific documentation relating to the investigation operations carried out by the Judicial Police - are completely unfounded:

«(...) it must be noted that the presence of a trace on the door sill of the car of the two defendants is a historical fact, collected on 26.12.2006, which the judges of merit could not underestimate and that the trace was particularly clear, so much so as to allow the genetic profile to be highlighted with extreme precision. The carrier of the trace was plausibly considered to be Romano, for the simple fact that he was the only one to get on board the driver's side of the car, if not before (...) the police checks on the car were always carried out without getting on board due to the modest dimensions of the car itself (it being a SEAT Arosa) (...) the historical data was uncontested (presence of the trace on the defendant's car), which is why in the present context it was not essential to identify with absolute certainty the means of transport of the trace in order to appreciate its probative value (...) the clarity of the trace led to the opinion that it had been brought directly from the crime scene, excluding that it could be the result of contamination from the crime scene (...) the search report [was] in fact signed by operators who, despite having participated in the complex operations that were necessary after the massacre, did not operate directly at the search (...) although questionable as a practice, the territorial court held that this modus operandi was understandable given the excitement of the moment (...)»

- With regard to the confessions of the two defendants - according to the defence heavily influenced by the actions of the Carabinieri and the public prosecutors, and therefore unreliable - the Court observes that:

«(...) on the fact that the confessions made by the two defendants were the result of an uncoerced decision, even if required by the urgency of events, the judges of merit provided exhaustive motivation in the sentence (...) if it is true, as the court observed, that undoubtedly the defendants were subjected to a pressing but not prohibited solicitation to provide what they knew, given the gravity of the facts which required full light to be shed on them, on the other hand it cannot be considered that psychological pressure was applied such as to limit the freedom of self-determination (...) [it is not even relevant] the fact that in the conversations in prison between the two, before the decision to confess, they reiterated their innocence, since it was a conversation conducted in full awareness of being listened to at a distance (...) it is not possible to speak of repercussions in terms of correct adversarial proceedings and correct formation of evidence, precisely because Romano's declaratory contributions were accompanied by handwritten notes with full confessional content (...) [other elements which testify in favour of the reliability of the confessions are] the annotations in the Bible written by Romano, in which he expressed his bitterness towards the Marzouk-Castagna family, but asked for forgiveness for what he had done (...) both the sentences on the merits have demonstrated, with impeccable logical and argumentative progress, the seriousness of the evidentiary compendium brought by the prosecution which inevitably opposed the understandable protests of innocence raised in the very first procedural phases and in the trial phase, following the preliminary hearing by the two defendants»

- with regard to the circumstance that the two lower courts underestimated alternative paths, the Court notes that:

«(...) adequate justification was provided on the impracticability of alternative investigation fronts due to the lack of concrete investigative leads given the inconsistency of the data reported by Manzeni and Chemcoum, regarding the presence of a trio in front of via Diaz, 28, even though said trio included Raffaella Castagna's brother, who did not have an easy relationship with his sister, since nothing more had emerged. It was added that it was necessary for strangers to the court to have the keys to access the building where the massacre took place, given the absence of signs of forced entry to the lock (...) the judges, with a completely linear opinion, supported the implausibility of the fact that the attackers were heard by the tenant of the floor below, for the simple reason that the attackers waiting for their prey would have very unlikely made their presence known to those living in the apartment below (...) the unhealthy environment frequented by Marzouk, involved in drug trafficking, was also considered as the place where the criminal action had originated, but no evidence emerged to support this hypothesis»

== Developments and legal appeals ==
Rosa Bazzi is serving her sentence in Bollate prison, while Olindo Romano is serving his sentence in Opera prison; the two are allowed to meet once a month.

In April 2011 Azouz Marzouk changed his mind, claiming that the Romanos were not the culprits.

In 2012, Azouz Marzouk, who had remarried in Tunisia in the meantime, still believing the Romanos to be innocent, stated that he wanted a review of their trial. It was later reported that Azouz Marzouk himself had been sued by the victims' family for having violently addressed, with unkind and incorrect terms, the victims' family.

In September 2012, Azouz Marzouk filed an appeal with the European Court of Human Rights (ECHR), because he had identified what he claimed were numerous procedural defects in which the judges had incurred in all three levels of judgment. The European Court declared the appeal inadmissible. He appealed again before the same Court, but it was again rejected for the same reasons.

In 2012, the two convicted persons appealed to the European Court of Human Rights, which rejected the appeal due to an absolute lack of jurisdiction, renouncing the right to appeal.

In 2013, the Romano spouses' defence team filed an appeal aimed at reviewing the guilt trial in accordance with the current legislation provided for in the criminal procedure code regarding review of the trial.

In August 2014, the couple ended their daytime isolation, which had been inflicted on them in the three levels of judgment. About a month later, Mario Frigerio, the only survivor of the massacre, died at the age of 73 in his home in Como after a long illness.

In March 2023, Azouz Marzouk was sentenced for defamation to pay €70,000 to Giuseppe and Pietro Castagna, the brothers of Raffaella Castagna, after suggesting in an interview that the Castagna family was responsible for the massacre.

=== The appeal to the European Court of Human Rights ===
In September 2012, the Corriere di Como reported the news of the appeal - already announced after the final conviction in the Supreme Court — filed by the two convicted persons at the European Court of Human Rights in March of the same year, in which, according to the defence, they highlighted numerous procedural defects that the judges had incurred in all three levels of judgement, which were detrimental to the right of defence of the accused during the criminal proceedings. In reality, as highlighted by the European Convention for the Protection of Human Rights and Fundamental Freedoms, the right to effective defence is defined autonomously in the various internal legal systems, therefore it is not possible to proceed with the non-application of the norm in force in the internal legal system in favour of the norm of the Convention, since for its application, the same convention refers to the internal legal system of the individual States. The appeal was declared inadmissible due to an absolute lack of jurisdiction. The defence renounced the subsequent appeal to the same Court as it did not consider a favourable outcome to be probable. The possibilities of appeal to supranational bodies were therefore exhausted.

A few months earlier, Azouz Marzouk - considering some passages of the conviction sentences to be contradictory - had also instructed his lawyer to appeal to the same Court. In two different sentences, the European Court of Human Rights (ECHR) declared inadmissible the appeal presented by Azouz Marzouk's lawyer for abusive exercise of the right to act, since he was not listed as an injured party, and according to the legal system, only those who believe they are the victim of a violation by the State of one of the rights and guarantees recognised by the Convention or its protocols can appeal to the Court, furthermore it declared inadmissible the subsequent appeal to the same Court for the same reasons.

=== Requests for a review of the process ===
- on the basis of the statements of Azouz Marzouk who, after the trial, believes the couple was unjustly convicted, provoking, among other things, the indignation of the relative of the victims Carlo Castagna;
- on a lead - never followed before - that sees as culprits of the massacre people belonging to organised crime gangs ('Ndrangheta), in any case of non-Arab nationality. This hypothesis was reported to Azouz Marzouk's mother by a man, at the time not better identified, who went to Tunisia to report this particular circumstance;
- on the basis of the summary information (never taken into consideration) given by the witness Ben Brahim Chemcoum, questioned at the time of the events by the Carabinieri of Erba, who reported — five days after the massacre — that «he had seen, around the time of the massacre, two people in front of the courtyard in via Diaz where, after the murders, the fire had been set. On Christmas Day 2006, Chemcoum had returned to the Carabinieri reporting that he had seen "a Tunisian and an Italian" with "a beret", voices shouting "murderer" and "help me", of a man with a "hurried step" who seemed to him to be "mad" and of "petrol". The Tunisian even indicated one of the people seen, without naming him, as "the brother of the dead woman", that is, Raffaella Castagna, wife of Azouz Marzouk.

The lawyers filed a motion to request new investigations, but the Como and Brescia prosecutors declared themselves "not competent". In April 2017, the Court of Cassation admitted the re-examination of seven pieces of evidence at the Court of Appeal of Brescia, granting that Court the power to conduct an evidentiary incident. After the lawyer requested an extension on the destruction of the evidence, the public prosecutor instead requested in July the destruction of such unexamined items, which was however blocked by the court at the request of the Romanos' lawyer. On the morning of 12 July 2018, on the basis of an order issued by the Court of Cassation, all of the items not yet analyzed, part of which, those in custody at the Office of Crime Evidence of the Court of Como, were delivered by a clerk to an incinerator in the capital, which, at the same time, carried out their destruction. Some of the evidence, in the possession of the defense, was kept at the University of Pavia. In various sentences of 2018, the Court of Cassation repeatedly rejected the request to proceed with the examination of the evidence that had never been analysed, not seeing any utility or purpose in this regard: one of the new evidences consisted, for example, of a Motorola cell phone whose ownership was already known, namely that of the victim Raffaella Castagna.

In April 2023, Milan's deputy attorney general Cuno Tarfusser presented a new request for a review of the trial, arguing that the testimony of witness Mario Frigerio was not reliable, that the DNA trace found on Olindo Romano's door sill could be due to contamination that occurred during the investigations, and that the Romano spouses' confessions contained too many errors to be credible.

In July, Attorney General Francesca Nanni announced that she had decided not to pursue the request and initiated disciplinary proceedings against Tarfusser because, according to the organizational document of the office, only the Attorney General was entitled to request a review. In January 2024, the request for review was admitted to discussion before the Court of Appeal of Brescia with hearings starting in March 2024. On 10 July 2024, the Court of Appeal of Brescia definitively decided not to proceed with a new trial, rejecting the request for review because the elements brought by the defense did not constitute new evidence.

On 10 March 2025, the Court of Cassation confirmed the CSM's censure of Tarfusser who requested a review of the trial, accused of having acted autonomously, failing to fulfil the "duties of impartiality and correctness" by having filed the request on his own initiative, "in clear violation of the organizational document of the office" which assigns this power only to the Attorney General at the Court of Appeal or his deputy and "having acted as if he were the couple's lawyer and asking for the review alone to gain media visibility.

On 25 March 2025, the Court of Cassation closed the case by rejecting the appeal of the defence lawyers who asked for the reopening of the case, with a sentence previously declared "inadmissible" on appeal and de facto sanctioning the end of the controversy related to the guilt of the spouses.

== Victims ==
- Paola Galli (57 years old), mother of Raffaella Castagna and mother-in-law of Azouz Marzouk.
- Raffaella Castagna (30 years old), wife of Azouz Marzouk.
- Youssef Marzouk (2 years old), son of Raffaella Castagna and Azouz Marzouk.
- Valeria Cherubini (55 years old), neighbour and wife of Mario Frigerio.

== Cultural impact ==
=== Podcast ===
- Investigations: Erba, December 11, 2006 (2022), podcast in two episodes edited by Stefano Nazzi.
- DPEN Crimes: The Erba Massacre (2021), a fourteen-episode podcast curated by Luca Pallavidino.
- Urban Demons: The Republic of Rosa and Olindo (2020), podcast by Gli Ascoltabili edited by Gianluca Chinnici and Giuseppe Paternò Raddusa.

=== Influences in mass culture ===
Olindo and Rosa are mentioned in the following passages:

- In Cage by M¥SS KETA
- Killer Star by Immanuel Casto.
- Story of a cursed by Bonnot ft. Caparezza, Tino Tracanna and Paolo Fresu
- Up the Hands by Fabri Fibra
- Lewandowski II by Ernia
- L'Erba di Grace by Salmo
- Rosa e Olindo by Colapesce Dimartino
- La Profezia dell'armadillo by Zerocalcare, and in "Pattini"
- GTA VI by Dani Faiv, MadMan and Mattak

== Bibliography ==
- Pino Corrias (2007). Vicini da morire. La strage di Erba e il Nord Italia divorato dalla paura. Milano: Mondadori. ISBN 978-88-04-57300-5.
- Felice Manti ed Edoardo Montolli (2008). Il grande abbaglio. Aliberti.
- Edoardo Montolli, L'enigma di Erba, RCS, 2010.
- Paolo Moretti e Stefano Ferrari Trenta passi. La vera storia della strage di Erba, 2010.
- Cristiana Cimmino, Finché morte non ci separi. Olindo Romano e Rosa Bazzi visti da vicino, La Riflessione, 2010.
- Stefania Panza e Paola D'Amico (2011). Una strage imperfetta. Erba, analisi di un delitto. TuttiAutori. ISBN 978-88-48812-19-1.
- Luca Steffenoni (2011). Nera. Come la cronaca cambia i delitti. San Paolo. ISBN 978-88-21571-98-5.
- Roberta Bruzzone (2013). Chi è l'assassino. Diario di una criminologa. Mondadori. ISBN 978-88-04613-04-6.
- Andrea Jelardi (2014). Bianco, Rosso e...Giallo. Piccoli e grandi delitti e misteri italiani in venticinque anni di cronaca nera (1988-2013). Napoli: Kairòs. ISBN 978-88-98029-87-7.
- Edoardo Montolli e Felice Manti (2020). Il grande abbaglio. Controinchiesta sulla strage di Erba. Teaser LAB e Microprint. ISBN 978-88-99654-16-0.
- Antonino Monteleone e Francesco Priano (2023). Erba. Piemme. ISBN 978-88-56694-07-9.
- Edoardo Montolli e Felice Manti (2024). Olindo e Rosa. Il più atroce errore giudiziario nella storia della Repubblica. Algama. ISBN 979-12-80265-57-9.
- Martina Piazza (2024). L'erba dei vicini. Evoluzione di un'indagine. Torino: Golem Edizioni. ISBN 978-88-92912-07-6.
- Paolo Moretti (2024). Sangue e fango. Dominioni. ISBN 978-88-98911-75-2.
- Alessandra Carati (2024). Rosy. Mondadori. ISBN 978-88-04764-03-8.
- Riccardo Bocca (2024). L'inferno di Rosa e Olindo. Ponte alle Grazie. ISBN 979-12-55820-22-2.
