= Franco Cuomo =

Italian journalist and writer

Franco Cuomo (22 April 1938, in Naples – 23 July 2007, in Rome) was an Italian journalist and writer.

Best known for his historical novels set in the Middle Ages, he was short-listed twice for the Strega Award (the most prestigious literary prize in Italy), first with Gunther d'Amalfi, cavaliere templare (Gunter D'Amalfi, Knight Templar) in 1990 and then Il Codice Macbeth in 1997.

According to Rocco Capozzi, Gunther d'Amalfi's publication, shortly after Foucault's Pendulum, "started a trend of neo-historical novels featuring symbols and secret codes linked to Templars, Rosicrucians, Cathars and Masons" in Italy.

Cuomo gained a degree in law and then simultaneously worked in journalism and the theatre, moving on to fiction and historical studies.

His most recent works included the novels I sotterranei del cielo, Il tatuaggio, and Anime perdute. Notturno veneziano con messa nera e fantasmi d'amore and the nonfiction I dieci examined the Italian scientists who signed the "Racial Manifesto" in 1938 leading to the introduction of racial laws.

Among his other works of fiction are I semidei, a spy story set in contemporary Italy with clear references to many of the major figures involved in Tangentopoli inspired by his work as journalist, Il signore degli specchi on the life of Nostradamus, and Scroll on the legend that Shakespeare may not have been English. He is also the author a five-volume series on the origins of Europe, Il romanzo di Carlo Magno, and a biography of Rita da Cascia, Santa Rita degli impossibili. The latter, rejecting a sort of hagiographic stance, instead reconstructs the mystery in which the medieval mystic was involved surrounding the murder of her husband.

His works of nonfiction include works on idleness (L'ozio), seduction (Elogio del libertino), Oscar Wilde Victorian decadence (Chi ha guardato negli occhi la bellezza), the tragedy of Beatrice Cenci and historical themes concerning the formation and influence of the collective imagination, such as Le grandi profezie (on prophecies from the dawn of human civilization to the modern age) and on knighthood (Gli ordini cavallereschi nel mito e nella storia).

He was the author of a vast theatrical body of works, staged in Italy and abroad by such directors as Carmelo Bene, Maurizio Scaparro, Sergio Fantoni, and Françoise Petite. They include Faust o Margherita (with Carmelo Bene), Romeo e Giulietta (with Carmelo Bene and Roberto Lerici), Compagno Gramsci, Il caso Matteotti, Caterina delle misericordie (Premio Riccione), Nerone (Premio Idi), Giovanna d'Arco e Gilles de Rais (Premio Vallecorsi), Addio amore (Beatrice Cenci) (Premio Fondi), Una notte di Casanova (Premio Flaiano) and the recent Gladiator.

Among his awards were the Fregene Prize for journalism (1984), the Premio per la Cultura della Presidenza del Consiglio (1989), the Ravello (1990), the Vanvitelli (1995), and the Blow In (1997).

He translated Utopia by Thomas More and numerous classics for stage productions including Cyrano de Bergerac and Albert Camus' Caligula, directed by Maurizio Scaparro, as well as works by Shakespeare, Christopher Marlowe, Ben Jonson, Plautus and Alfred de Musset.

He worked with public broadcaster RAI and directed or advised on a wide variety of radio and television programmes on cultural topics (L'occhio sul teatro and Magico e nero for Videosapere) as well as ones appealing to a more general audience (Cararai, Cronache del cinema e del teatro, Obbiettivo Europa and Cineteatro).

Over his life he was on the editorial staff of a number of newspapers and periodicals as special correspondent, critic and editor-in-chief of culture sections, as well as co-edito of magazines (Fiera and Achab) and author of monographs for specialized magazines (Medioevo and Ulisse 2000).

He frequently appeared as a guest on television programmes on RAI, Mediaset and other broadcasters, taking part in programmes including Stargate, Voyageur, Unomattina, Maurizio Costanzo, Top Secret and SpecialestoriaTG1.

The last essay he published for the daily newspaper l'Unità readers in 2005 was "I DIECI: chi erano gli scienziati italiani che firmarono il manifesto della razza" ("The Ten: who were the Italian scientists that signed the race manifesto").
