= Saadi v Italy =

2008 case of the European Court of Human Rights

Decided 28 February 2008
- Full case name: Saadi v Italy
- Case: 37201/06
- Chamber: Grand Chamber
- Nationality of parties: Italy

Saadi v Italy was a case of the European Court of Human Rights (ECtHR) decided in February 2008, in which the Court unanimously reaffirmed and extended principles established in Chahal v United Kingdom regarding the absolute nature of the principle of non-refoulement and the obligations of a state under Article 3 of the European Convention on Human Rights (ECHR).

In particular the Court addressed the role of an exchange of notes between Italy (the state which sought to deport Saadi) and Tunisia (the receiving state, to which he would be deported) and ruled that it was inadequate to protect against the risk that Saadi would be ill-treated, as Tunisia had only restated Tunisian law and had not made the diplomatic assurances against ill-treatment requested by Italy. The ruling did not directly address in its ratio whether diplomatic assurances could constitute adequate protection in general when such assurances were provided by states known to practice torture, but reiterated in dicta that even if Italy had received such assurances, the Court would still have examined them for reliability.

== Background ==
Nassim Saadi, a Tunisian citizen, had resided in Italy since the late 1990s and held a residence permit from the Bologna police. Saadi was arrested in Italy on charges of conspiracy to commit acts of violence with the aim of spreading terror, falsification of documents, receiving stolen goods, and aiding and abetting illegal entry. At trial before Milan Corte d'Assise, he was found guilty of a downgraded charge of criminal conspiracy on 9 May 2005 and sentenced to four-and-a-half years imprisonment followed by deportation to Tunisia. Two days later, Saadi's trial in absentia before a military tribunal in Tunis concluded and resulted in a conviction for incitement to terrorism and membership in a terrorist organisation, with a sentence of twenty years' imprisonment.

Saadi was released on 9 August 2006, but the Italian Minister of the Interior made a deportation order against him the following day. In municipal law, appeal from the deportation order laid to the Regional Administrative Tribunal and to the Council of State, but execution of the deportation order would not be stayed whilst the appeal was pending. Saadi's request for political asylum was also denied on the national security grounds. As such, Saadi lodged his appeal to the European Court of Human Rights (ECtHR) on 14 September 2006.

== Submissions by the parties ==
Saadi argued that his deportation to Tunisia created a "real risk" that he would be subject to torture or inhuman or degrading treatment and that the deportation would thus contravene Article 3 of the Convention. He further argued that deportation would abrogate his right to a fair trial under Article 6 (due to his conviction in absentia in Tunisia), and that it would deprive his wife and son of his support and thus contravene Article 8. Italy argued that it had received diplomatic assurances from Tunisia that Saadi would not be subject to torture and that its receipt of such assurances fulfilled its Article 3 obligations.

The United Kingdom as intervenor urged the Court to modify the "real risk" standard established in Chahal v. United Kingdom to allow the risk of torture to be balanced against consideration of the individual's dangerousness. The United Kingdom had repeatedly criticised the "absolute ban" established in Chahal and was an intervenor in two other Article 3 cases simultaneously pending before the ECtHR, namely Ramzy v the Netherlands and A v the Netherlands.

== Judgment ==
In the unanimous decision, the Grand Chamber accepted Saadi's argument that Italy was in violation of Article 3. Addressing the United Kingdom's arguments submitted as intervenor, the Court ruled that the threat that Saadi posed to Italy did not reduce the risk of ill-treatment in Tunisia.

The Court was faced with the question of assessing whether there existed a risk of Saadi facing torture or ill treatment were he to be deported to Tunisia. This was a different question than a standard of proof for an event that had already occurred, as it involved forecasting the likelihood of a future event. The Court adopted the test of "whether substantial grounds have been shown for believing that there is a real risk of treatment incompatible with Article 3", which English courts have subsequently referred to as the "Saadi test". The Court did not reach Saadi's Article 6 (right to a fair trial) and Article 8 (right to family life) arguments, ruling that since "there was no reason to doubt" that Italy would comply with the Court's order in relation to Article 3, there was no need to address the more complicated issue of whether an expulsion or potential expulsion could constitute a violation of the right to a fair trial. In its jurisprudence up to 2008 the Court had never addressed that issue.

== Reception ==
The ECtHR addressed the persuasiveness of diplomatic assurances again in Beh Khemais v Italy shortly after. Saadi was soon after applied in the English courts in AS & DD v Secretary of State for the Home Department, [2008] EWCA Civ 289. to bar the deportation to Libya of the two applicants.

Saadi was hailed as a "landmark" case by human rights organisations including Amnesty International, Human Rights Watch, and the International Commission of Jurists despite that the ruling seemed a foregone result given earlier case law. The case's significance lay in that it rejected repeated calls for a "balancing test" to be introduced in response to the new "international climate" of terrorism. Some commentators compared and contrasted the case with the earlier Suresh v Canada (Minister of Citizenship and Immigration), in which the Supreme Court of Canada did not categorically reject deporting an individual to a state where he or she could face the risk of torture, but instead applied such a balancing test.

In light of the bar against deportation which Saadi reiterated, parties to the ECHR were left to look into other methods of protecting the public from dangerous individuals who could not be returned to their countries of origin. One scholar subsequently argued that civil detention following completion of criminal sentence could be justified under Article 15 of the ECHR.
