= Vivione Pass =

Mountain pass in Lombardy, Italy

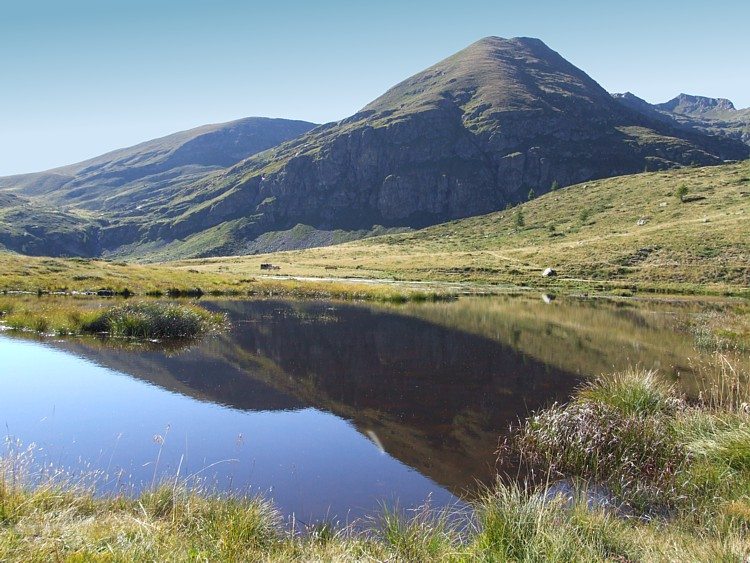

- Location within Alps
- Elevation: 1,828 metres (5,997 ft)

Third Approach
- Location: Italy
- Range: Bergamo Alps
- Coordinates: 46°02′16″N 10°12′10″E

Vivione Pass Passo (Italian Passo del Vivione) is a mountain pass that links Schilpario in Val di Scalve with Paisco Loveno in Val Camonica. The road was built during World War I to supply troops in the nearby Adamello. Vivione Pass has a height of 1828 m and is usually closed for snow from December to May, the road is not larger than 2 meters but is paved.

== See also ==
- List of highest paved roads in Europe
- List of mountain passes
