= Drug Target Insights =

- Discipline: Pharmacology
- Language: English
- Edited by: Giulio Zuanetti (interim)

Publication details
- History: 2006–Present
- Publisher: AboutScience Srl
- Open access: Yes

Standard abbreviations
- ISO 4: Drug Target Insights

Indexing
- ISSN: 1177-3928
- LCCN: 2007243676
- OCLC no.: 502638151

Links
- Journal homepage; SAGE website

Drug Target Insights is a peer-reviewed open access academic journal focusing on drug treatment targets and clinical therapeutics. The journal was founded in 2006 by Monica Milani and is currently edited by Giulio Zuanetti. It was originally published by Libertas Academica, but SAGE Publications became the publisher in September 2016. In 2020, the journal was transferred to AboutScience Srl.

== Indexing ==
The journal is abstracted and indexed in the following bibliographic databases:

- Academic Search Premier
- DOAJ
- EMBASE
- Emerging Sources Citation Index
- Web of Science
- Scopus

According to Scopus, it has a 2020 CiteScore of 4.6, ranking 11th out of 67th in the category 'General Pharmacology, Toxicology and Pharmaceutics'.
