= Eurostar 9410 derailment =

2005 railway incident in Italy

Details
- Date: 24 October 2005
- Location: Bari, Apulia, Italy
- Incident type: derailment
- Cause: landslide following severe weather

Statistics
- Deaths: 0
- Injured: 35

The Eurostar 9410 derailment was a minor railroad accident that occurred in Bari, Apulia, Italy, on 24 October 2005. While causing no deaths, it left 30 wounded and five critically injured. It received considerable attention from mass media.

== Weather over Apulia ==
An anomalous wave of poor weather hit southern Italy between 23 and 24 October 2005, including heavy rains that caused minor landslides and swelling in many rivers and streams. In three hours, more rain fell in the area than Apulia's usual yearly rate. The weather was reported as an "exceptional climate event" by Guido Bertolaso, then president of the Protezione Civile.

The preceding night, a bridge above a dry riverbed in Cassano delle Murge collapsed, killing five. Another bridge near Adelfia collapsed under the water, flooding many roads. In Bari, a car was swept away by a wave in a canal into the sea, killing one. A whole city district was isolated, while another flooded with mud, some of its road demolished by land movements caused by water.

The rain concerned railway officials, who feared that landslides could hit the hillside line serving the city. Local officers organized a patrol to check conditions of the railway, and drove a service vehicle along part of the track, returning minutes before the disaster.

== Eurostar 9410 ==
The train left Bari at 5.35 a.m., heading to Taranto. The train was a standard ETR 500 trainset, moved by two FS Class E404 in push-pull configuration. About 60 passengers were aboard.

Between Acquaviva delle Fonti and Sannicandro stations, the ground beneath the railway was caught in a landslide, while part of the hill was brought into the valley by the water rolling down from the side.

The steel rails remained suspended above the newly made 30-meter-wide and 12-meter-deep cliff, unbroken. The train, weighing in excess of 500 tons, crossed the gap while the landslide was still in progress. While crossing, all cars derailed, and the train came to a stop with its second E404 partially suspended above the cliff.

Notwithstanding the landslide and the derailment, all the coaches managed to stay upright. Technicians of Ferrovie dello Stato acknowledged that only the high speed of the train allowed the convoy to escape the collapsing ground.

Five people sustained serious wounds, while 17 received minor scratches and broken limbs.

== Aftermath and inquiry ==
The railway was closed for eight days, allowing recovery of the trainset and rebuilding of the rail ballast. Prosecutors from Bari court opened a formal inquiry about the incident, in order to check if maintenance on the railway was sound and ordinary checks had been dutifully processed.

The company who built the collapsed track was charged with malpractice in design and execution of the works. Nine people were indicted, four of them accused of lying in an official document, misrepresenting part of the work done in the technical survey.
