= La Casta =

2007 Italian book by Sergio Rizzo and Gian Antonio Stella

La casta. Così i politici italiani sono diventati intoccabili (The Caste: How Italian Politicians Became Untouchable) is an Italian book, written by Sergio Rizzo and Gian Antonio Stella, two journalists from the Italian national newspaper Corriere della Sera, detailing the amount of graft and corruption in Italian politics. It was published in 2007, and became a bestseller.
