= Mauro Mellano =

Italian economist

Mauro Mellano (1944– 21 September 2007) was an Italian economist and professor at the University of Rome La Sapienza.

== Bibliography ==
- Mellano, M. and Zupi, M. (2007) Economia e politica della cooperazione allo sviluppo Editori Laterza.
- Mellano, M. (2004) Riconsiderando alcune teorie dello sviluppo economico (Roma 2004)
- Mellano, M. and Schenkel, M. (eds) (2004) Le imprese del terzo tipo : economia e etica delle organizzazioni non profit .
- Mellano, M.(eds.) (2002) 'Integrazione economica e Cooperazione allo sviluppo nel bacino del Mediterraneo', La Sapienza Editrice.
- Mellano, M., Costantini, V., Capriolo, A. (2002) Crescita economica, Commercio internazionale e inquinamento globale Sinergie, 20(59), 2002, pp. 43–60
- Mellano, M., (2000) "Gli aspetti strutturali e le prospettive di internazionalizzazione nell'industria agro alimentare", L'Industria, 21(1), 2000, pp. 27–53.
- Mellano, M.,(1999) "Acquacoltura e dinamiche di mercato", Annali del dipartimento di studi geoeconomici, statistici, storici per l'analisi regionale atistici, storici per l'analisi regionale, 5, 1999, pp. 359–368.
- Mellano, M, Pesce, A. (1996) "Commercio Sud-Sud e integrazione economica.", Politica internazionale, 24(5), 1996, pp. 253–271.
- Mellano, M. and Javier Diez de Medina Romero (1995) "L'aiuto alimentare in alcuni paesi dell'America Latina e dell'Africa sub-sahariana" in Gervasio Antonelli, Elisabetta Basile "L'aiuto pubblico allo sviluppo. L'esperienza della comunità europea"
- Lorusso and Mellano, M. (1993)La struttura dell'industria alimentare nelle principali aree ad economia di mercato Edizioni Scientifiche Italiane
- Antonelli, G. Bagarani, M. Mellano, M. (1989) Modelli di spesa e politica agraria regionale. Un'analisi della spesa pubblica delle regioni a statuto ordinario.
- Antonelli, G. M.Bagarani, M. Mellano, M (1989), Modelli di spesa e politica agra- ria regionale. Un'analisi della spesa pubblica delle regioni a statuto ordinario, Facoltà di Economia e Commercio di Urbino, F.Angeli, Milano.
- Antonelli, G. M.Bagarani, M. Mellano, M (1988), La spesa pubblica per l'agricoltura delle regioni a statuto ordinario, Ministero del Tesoro, Roma.
- Antonelli, G. M.Bagarani, M. Mellano, M (1987), Spesa pubblica per l'agricoltura delle regioni a statuto ordinario (Problemi e prospettive della politica agraria livello regionale), Università di Urbino - CESIT.
- Bagarani, M, Magni, C. Mellano, M. (1986) "Specializzazione produttiva e differenziazioni regionali nell'agricoltura italiana: un metodo di valutazione", Rivista di economia agraria, (4), 1986, pp. 423.
- Antonelli, G. and Mellano, M. (1984)"Strumenti e obiettivi di politica agraria nell'analisi della spesa pubblica regionale", QA La Questione agraria, (15), 1984, pp. 77.
- Antonelli, G. and Mellano, M. (1982) "La valutazione degli effetti delle politiche regionali: una rassegna di alcuni modelli", Rivista di economia agraria, (1), 1982, pp. 227.
- Antonelli G., Mellano M. (1981), La politica agraria delle regioni attraverso un’analisi di spesa pubblica, QA -La Questione Agraria, n. 3.
- Antonelli, G. and Mellano, M. (1980)"La spesa per l'agricoltura delle regioni a statuto ordinario. Un bilancio di politica agraria", Rivista di economia agraria, (3), 1980, pp. 597.

== Students ==
- Massimo Bagarani, Professor
- Linda Meleo, Municipal councilor of Rome
- Simone Santi, President Leonardo Group, President Eurocam Mocambique, President CCMI (Italian Mozmbican Chamber of Commerce), President Energy O&G and Mineral Resources CTA (Mozambican Business Association) Honorary Consul of Mozambique (Milan) Italian Delegate CE- CPLP CE- Palop (Portuguese speaking African and int countries)
- Alessandro Spaventa, Managing director Internazionale
- Giosuè Pesare
- Giorgio Riso - Imprenditore
