= 2003 in Italy =

- Decades: 1980s; 1990s; 2000s; 2010s; 2020s
- See also: History of Italy; Timeline of Italian history; List of years in Italy

Events in Italy in 2003:

== Incumbents ==
- President: Carlo Azeglio Ciampi
- Prime Minister: Silvio Berlusconi

== Events ==
- January 31: Miss Universo Italia 2003
- February 12: The newspaper Europa is founded.
- February 17: Abu Omar is abducted by the CIA and SISMI.
- March 16: Murder of Davide Cesare.
- June 16: Lega Nord Leader Umberto Bossi While being Reforms minister says in a controversial interview the Navy should fire live rounds on boats holding illegal immigrants, stating: "After the second or third warning, bang... we fire the cannon."
- June 17: Wind Jet starts operating.
- July 31: Sky Italia is founded by Rupert Murdoch.
- September 28: 2003 Italy blackout

== Elections ==
- Italian regional elections, 2003
- Italian referendum, 2003
- Friuli-Venezia Giulia regional election, 2003
- Trentino-Alto Adige/Südtirol provincial elections, 2003
- Valdostan regional election, 2003

== Sport ==
- Serie A 2002–03
- Serie B 2002–03
- 2003 Coppa Italia Final
- 2002 Supercoppa Italiana
- 2003 UEFA Champions League Final
- 2003 Italian Grand Prix
- 2003 San Marino Grand Prix
- 2003 Italian motorcycle Grand Prix
- 2003 Italy rugby union tour
- 2003 Women's Hockey Champions Challenge
- 2003 UCI Cyclo-cross World Championships
- 2003 European Curling Championships
- FIVB World Grand Prix 2003
- 2003 Giro d'Italia
- 2003 Women's World Ice Hockey Championships
- 2003 Milan–San Remo
- 2003 World Rowing Championships
- 2003 ISSF World Cup
- 2003 Winter Universiade
- 2003 World Interuniversity Games

== Film ==
- 60th Venice International Film Festival

== Music ==
- List of number-one hits of 2003 (Italy)

== Television ==
- 2003 in Italian television

== Deaths ==
- 4 March - Fedora Barbieri, operatic mezzo-soprano (born 1920)
- 7 July – Mario Pedini, politician (born 1918)
- 28 October– Sally Baldwin, social sciences professor (born 1940 in Scotland)
