= List of Italian films of 2003 =

A list of films produced in Italy in 2003 (see 2003 in film):

Title	Director	Cast	Genre	Notes
2003
Adored	Marco Filiberti	Urbano Barberini	drama	
At the End of the Night	Salvatore Piscicelli	Ennio Fantastichini, Ida Di Benedetto, Elena Sofia Ricci	Drama	
The Best of Youth (La meglio gioventù)	Marco Tullio Giordana	Alessio Boni, Fabrizio Gifuni, Luigi Lo Cascio, Andrea Tidona, Adriana Asti, Sonia Bergamasco, Maya Sansa, Jasmine Trinca	Drama	6 David di Donatello, 7 Nastro d'Argento
Break Free (Liberi)	Gianluca Maria Tavarelli	Elio Germano, Nicole Grimaudo	Romance	
Caterina in the Big City (Caterina va in città)	Paolo Virzì	Sergio Castellitto, Margherita Buy, Alice Teghil	comedy	
The Cruelest Day	Ferdinando Vicentini Orgnani	Giovanna Mezzogiorno, Rade Šerbedžija, Amanda Plummer, Tony Lo Bianco	Drama	
Facing Windows (La finestra di fronte)	Ferzan Özpetek	Giovanna Mezzogiorno, Massimo Girotti, Raoul Bova, Serra Yilmaz	Drama	5 David di Donatello. 3 Nastro d'Argento
Five Moons Square	Renzo Martinelli	Donald Sutherland, Giancarlo Giannini, Stefania Rocca, F. Murray Abraham	political thriller	
Forever (Per sempre)	Ferzan Özpetek	Giancarlo Giannini, Francesca Neri	Drama	
Gente di Roma	Ettore Scola	citizens of Rome, Stefania Sandrelli	Comedy- Documentary	
Ginger and Cinnamon (Dillo con parole mie)	Daniele Luchetti	Stefania Montorsi, Giampaolo Morelli, Martina Merlino	Comedy	
Good Morning, Night (Buongiorno, notte)	Marco Bellocchio	Roberto Herlitzka, Maya Sansa, Luigi Lo Cascio, Giovanni Calcagno, Paolo Briguglia, Giulio Bosetti	Drama	About Aldo Moro
Happiness Costs Nothing	Mimmo Calopresti	Mimmo Calopresti, Vincent Pérez, Valeria Bruni Tedeschi, Francesca Neri	Drama	
Household Accounts	Tonino Cervi	Gabriele Lavia, Claudio Bigagli	mystery	
I'm Not Scared (Io non ho paura)	Gabriele Salvatores	Giuseppe Cristiano, Mattia Di Pierro, Aitana Sánchez-Gijón, Diego Abatantuono	Drama	3 Nastro d'Argento
Incantato (Il cuore altrove)	Pupi Avati	Neri Marcorè, Vanessa Incontrada, Giancarlo Giannini, Sandra Milo	Love drama	Entered into the 2003 Cannes Film Festival
Instructing The Heart (Al cuore si comanda)	Giovanni Morricone	Claudia Gerini, Pierfrancesco Favino, Sabrina Impacciatore	Comedy	
It Can’t Be All Our Fault (Ma che colpa abbiamo noi)	Carlo Verdone	Carlo Verdone, Margherita Buy, Anita Caprioli	Comedy	
Kiss Me First	Ambrogio Lo Giudice	Stefania Rocca, Luca Zingaretti	comedy	Entered into the 26th Moscow International Film Festival
Life as It Comes	Stefano Incerti	Claudio Santamaria, Valeria Bruni Tedeschi, Stefania Sandrelli, Stefania Rocca, Tony Musante	Drama	
Lost Love (Perdutoamor)	Franco Battiato	Corrado Fortuna, Donatella Finocchiaro, Nicole Grimaudo	Drama	
Now or Never	Lucio Pellegrini	Violante Placido	Comedy-drama	
On My Skin	Valerio Jalongo	Ivan Franek, Donatella Finocchiaro	Drama	
Opopomoz	Enzo D'Alò	John Turturro, Fabio Volo, Silvio Orlando, Tonino Accolla	animation	
Past Perfect	Maria Sole Tognazzi	Valentina Cervi, Paola Cortellesi, Claudio Santamaria, Pierfrancesco Favino	comedy	Entered into the 25th Moscow International Film Festival
Pater Familias	Francesco Patierno	Marina Suma, Ernesto Mahieux	drama	
Il pranzo della domenica	Carlo Vanzina	Massimo Ghini, Elena Sofia Ricci, Barbara De Rossi, Giovanna Ralli	comedy	
Remember Me, My Love (Ricordati di me)	Gabriele Muccino	Fabrizio Bentivoglio, Laura Morante, Monica Bellucci, Nicoletta Romanoff, Silvio Muccino	Drama	3 Nastro d'Argento
The Return of Cagliostro	Ciprì & Maresco	Robert Englund, Luigi Maria Burruano	mockumentary	
Rua Alguem 5555: My Father	Egidio Eronico	Thomas Kretschmann, Charlton Heston, F. Murray Abraham, Thomas Heinze	Drama	
Secret File	Paolo Benvenuti	David Coco, Antonio Catania, Aldo Puglisi	drama	Entered into the 60th Venice Film Festival
Singing Behind Screens	Ermanno Olmi	Bud Spencer, Jun Ichikawa	Drama	3 David di Donatello, 4 Nastro d'Argento
The Soul's Place	Riccardo Milani	Silvio Orlando, Michele Placido, Claudio Santamaria	comedy-drama	

== See also ==
- 2003 in Italy
- 2003 in Italian television
