= Stefano Casertano =

Italian ilm director and producer

Stefano Casertano is an Italian film director, screenwriter, producer and immersive media creator.

In 2025, Casertano wrote and directed "Elena's War", a WWII drama starring Micaela Ramazzotti, produced by Titanus and Rai Cinema. In 2019 he served as associate producer on Franco Maresco 's documentary The Mafia Is No Longer What It Used to Be, awarded as Special Jury Prize at the Venice Film Festival - La Biennale di Venezia. He directed the narrative VR film "Tales of the march", selected by the 80. Venice Film Festival for the "Venice Immersive" section in 2023.

Casertano is an alumn of the Venice Biennale College for Virtual Reality. He holds a Ph.D. "Magna cum Laude" in Politics from Potsdam University, and an MBA from Columbia University, New York.

== Film career ==
His first documentary, "The Last Days of Tacheles", won the Honorable Mention at the International Berlin Film Awards.

His 2016 docufiction "People of Love and Rage" ("Gente di amore e Rabbia") won the DocFeed Film Festival in Eindhoven, received the Special Mention of the Jury at the Rome Independent Film Festival and has been selected by the Venice Film Week and the Broadway International Film Festival.

In 2021, his VR project "Tales of the March" was selected by the Venice Biennale for the development program "Biennale College VR" and was granted support by the Medienboard Berlin Brandenburg. Shooting started in March 2023 and the film was later selected by the "Venice Immersive" section of the 80. Venice Film Festival.

His film "The Poet who would be King" ("Il Poeta che volle farsi Re"), dedicated to poet Gabriele d'Annunzio and his "Impresa di Fiume", has been produced by Cinecittà - Luce and by Fondazione Vittoriale degli Italiani, starring historian Giordano Bruno Guerri and art-critic Vittorio Sgarbi. The film has been presented at Vittoriale for the 100th anniversary of d'Annunzio's ill-fated endeavour.

In 2025, Casertano directed "Elena's War", a historical drama set in Rome during WWII. The film stars Micaela Ramazzotti and is produced by Titanus, Rai Cinema and Masi Film. The film has been presented at the 20. Rome Film Fest in 2025 within the "Grand Public" selection; and distributed by Adler Entertainment and Minerva Pictures.

Casertano heads the production studio Daring House, specializing in immersive, XR, film and video production.

== Filmography ==
- "Elena del ghetto" ("Elena's War"), 2025, fiction, 110' - Director, writer and co-producer
- "Tales of the March", 2023, immersive short, 12' - Producer and director
- "American Ring", 2022, Documentary, colour, 80' - Producer and director
- "The Poet who would be King" ("Il Poeta che volle farsi Re"), 2022, Documentary, colour, 85' - Producer, writer and director
- The Mafia Is No Longer What It Used to Be (La mafia non è più quella di una volta) by Franco Maresco, 2019, Documentary, colour and b/w, 105', associate-producer
- "People of Love and Rage", 2016, Docufiction, B/W, 88' - writer and director
- "There Was Once a Sea", 2015, Documentary, colour, 84' - writer and director
- "The Last Days of Tacheles", 2014, Documentary, colour, 93' - writer and director

== Books ==
- "A morte Toscanini!", 2024, Bertoni Editore, 978-8855358149
