= World citizen (disambiguation) =

World citizen may refer to:

- World citizen, Social movement
- World Citizen (EP), an EP by Ryuichi Sakamoto and David Sylvian
- Citizens of the World, 2019 Italian comedy film

== See also ==
- Global Citizen (disambiguation)
