= The Uncle from Brooklyn =

1995 drama film

- Directed by: Ciprì & Maresco
- Screenplay by: Ciprì & Maresco
- Produced by: Galliano Juso
- Starring: Pippo Agusta
- Cinematography: Luca Bigazzi
- Edited by: Jacopo Quadri
- Music by: Joseph Vitale
- Distributed by: Filmauro
- Release date: 1995
- Language: Italian

The Uncle from Brooklyn (Italian: Lo zio di Brooklyn) is a 1995 Italian black comedy film written and directed by Ciprì & Maresco, at their feature film debut.

== Cast ==
- Pippo Agusta as Don Masino
- Francesco Arnao as Saint Polifemo
- Antonino Bruno as Zoras the Magician
- Rosario Carollo as Ciccio Gemelli
- Luigi Cinà as Paliddu

== Production ==
The film marked the feature debut of Daniele Ciprì and Franco Maresco, a duo of Sicilian filmmakers who had attracted critical acclaim and a cult following thanks to the Rai 3 series Cinico TV. It was shot in Palermo with a cast of non-professional actors and a budget of about 600 millions lire.

== Release ==
The film was selected for screening at the 52nd Venice International Film Festival, but the directors ultimately withdrew it, protesting against the choice of placing it into the secondary Window on Images sidebar. It was later screened at the 46th Berlin International Film Festival, in the Forum section.

== Reception ==
For this film Ciprì & Maresco were nominated for the Nastro d'Argento for Best New Directors. Luca Bigazzi won the Ciak d'Oro for Best Cinematography.

Variety's critic David Rooney described the film as a "both praiseworthy and disappointing", noting that "on one hand, it reps an exercise of extreme audaciousness, thumbing its nose at commercial film conventions. On the other, the tenuousness of the story makes it seem too much like an extended, at times undisciplined version of material with which Cipri and Maresco aficionados are already familiar". Time Out called it "deliriously weird" and "a gloriously bawdy black comedy". Director Gianni Amelio referred to it as "a heart-wrenching film", claiming "I don’t know whether it marks the end of cinema or its rebirth". In a retrospective analysis, Ernest Hampson similarly described it as "a film which bids farewell to the cinema", noting "it gradually unravels and self-destructs, in step with the imminent disintegration of the universe which it depicts", and its "perverse anti-narrative" apparently "take[s] pleasure in confusing and frustrating the expectations of the modern audience".
