= Letizia Battaglia =

Italian photographer and photojournalist (1935–2022)

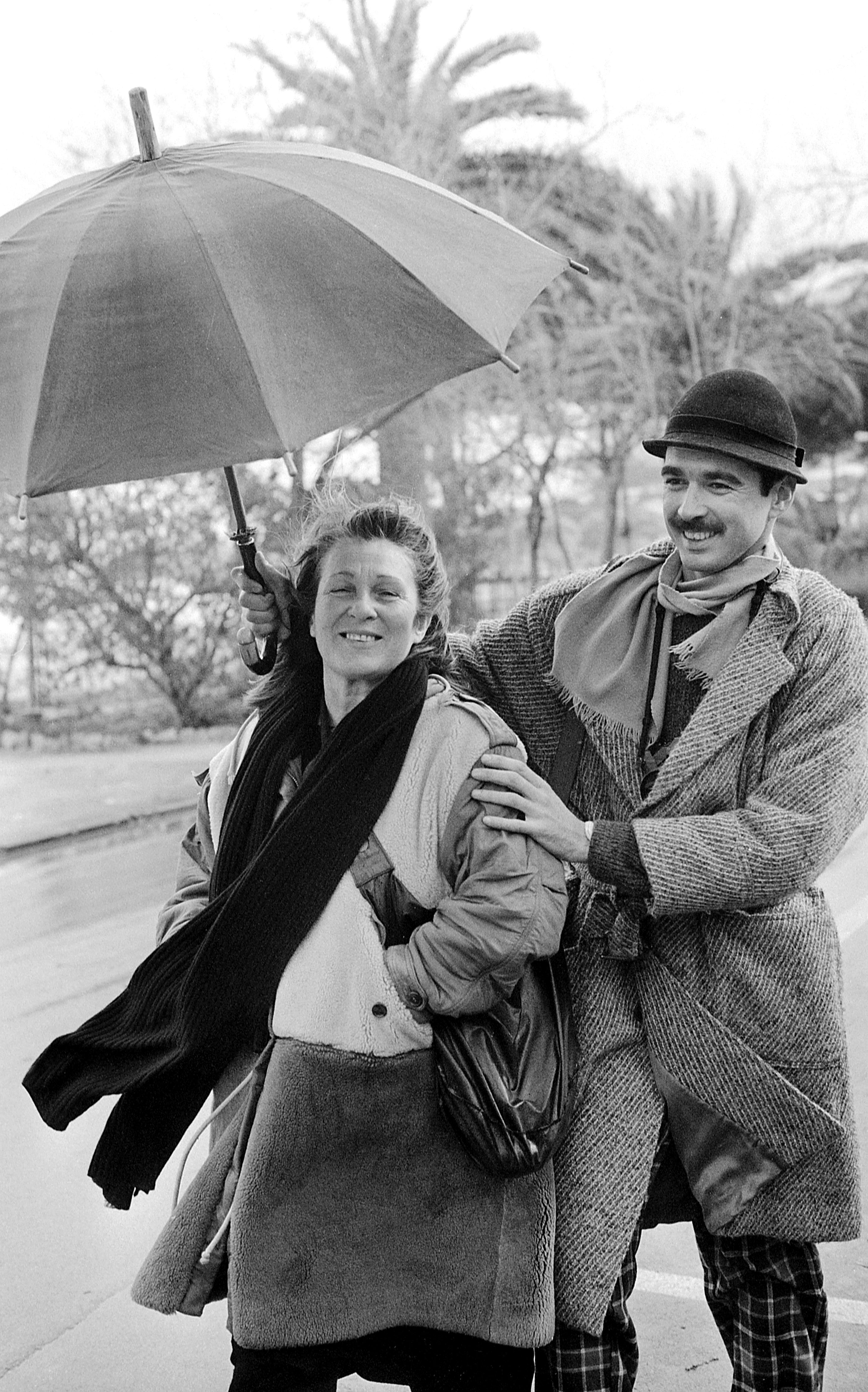
- Battaglia and Franco Zecchin in Mondello (1987)
- Born: 5 March 1935; Palermo, Italy
- Died: 13 April 2022 (aged 87); Cefalù, Italy
- Occupations: Photographer, photojournalist, politician
- Political party: Greens (1989–91); The Network (1991–99); SEL (2012–16)
- Spouse: Franco Stagnitta (m. 1951; div. 1971)
- Partner: Franco Zecchin (1974–2022)
- Children: 3
- Awards: W. Eugene Smith Grant in Humanistic Photography (1985); Photography Lifetime Achievement of the Mother Jones International Fund for Documentary Photography (1999); Dr. Erich Salomon Award, German Society for Photography (2007); Cornell Capa Infinity Award by the International Center of Photography (2009)

Letizia Battaglia (Italian pronunciation: [leˈtittsja batˈtaʎʎa]; 5 March 1935 – 13 April 2022) was an Italian photographer and photojournalist. Although her photos document a wide spectrum of Sicilian life, she is best known for her work on the Mafia.

A documentary film based on her life, Shooting the Mafia, was released in 2019.

== Early life ==
Battaglia was born in Palermo, Sicily. At the age of 14, her father became irate when she took interest in a boy, and sent her away to boarding school. Battaglia wanted to escape and had ambitions to write. Battaglia reacted to this by marrying Franco Stagnitta, who owned his own coffee business and came from a good family. She believed he would allow her to continue her studies, but he wanted her to be a conventional stay-at-home wife, so her writing ambition was thwarted.

Unhappy in her marriage, she eventually took another lover, though her husband shot at her when he found out. She took their daughters and moved to Milan.

== Work ==
Battaglia took up photojournalism after her divorce in 1971, while raising three daughters. She picked up a camera when she found that she could better sell her articles if they were accompanied by photographs and slowly discovered a passion for photography. In 1974, after a period in Milan during which she met her long-time partner Franco Zecchin, she returned to Sicily to work for the left-wing L'Ora newspaper in Palermo until it was forced to close in 1992.

Battaglia took some 600,000 images as she covered the territory for the paper. She documented the ferocious internal war of the Mafia and its assault on civil society. She sometimes found herself at the scene of four or five different murders in a single day. Battaglia and Zecchin produced many of the iconic images that have come to represent Sicily and the Mafia beyond Italy. She wanted to expose and condemn the Mafia through her photography. She photographed the dead so often that she once said, "Suddenly, I had an archive of blood." She took her photographs of the dead in black and white as she believed it was more respectful, and offered its own silence.

As a result of her photographs, Battaglia spent many years fearing assassination from the Mafia. Even so, she chose not to have bodyguards. In 2017 she told The Guardian that "You no longer knew who your friends or enemies were. In the morning you came out of the house and did not know if you'd come back in the evening".

Battaglia also became involved in women's and environmental issues. For several years she stopped taking pictures and officially entered the world of politics. From 1985 to 1991 she held a seat on the Palermo city council for the Green Party, and from 1991 to 1996 she was a Deputy at the Sicilian Regional Assembly for The Network. She was instrumental in saving and reviving the historic centre of Palermo. For a time she ran a publishing house, Edizioni della Battaglia, and co-founded a monthly journal for women, Mezzocielo. She was involved in working for the rights of women and, most recently, prisoners.

In 1993, when prosecutors in Palermo indicted Giulio Andreotti, who had been Prime Minister of Italy seven times, the police searched Battaglia's archives and found two 1979 photographs of Andreotti with an important Mafioso, Nino Salvo, whom he had denied knowing. Aside from the accounts of turncoats, these pictures were the only physical evidence of this powerful politician's connections to the Sicilian Mafia. Battaglia herself had forgotten having taken the photograph. Its potential significance was apparent only 15 years after it was taken.

Outside of photography, her other ventures included a women's magazine, a publishing house and a photography school.

== Death ==
Battaglia died at the age of 87 in Cefalù on April 13, 2022. She had been ill for some time.

== Publications ==
- Passion, Justice, Freedom – Photographs of Sicily. Gordonsville, VA: Aperture, 2003. ISBN 0-89381-888-7.
- Dovere di Cronaca - The Duty to Report., Rome: Peliti Associati, 2006. With Franco Zecchin. ISBN 88-89412-26-7.
- Just For Passion. Drago, 2016. ISBN 978-8898565207.
- Anthology. Drago, 2016. ISBN 978-8898565191.

== Exhibitions ==
- Letizia Battaglia. Just For Passion, MAXXI - National Museum of the 21st Century Arts, Rome, 2016
- Siciliana, Bel Vedere Fotografia, Milan, Italy
- Bildmaterial der Dr.-Erich-Salomon-Preisträgerin 2007 Letizia Battaglia
- Dovere di Cronaca, Festival Internazionale di Roma, 2006
- Una vita per la Mafia, Orvieto Photography festival, Palazzo dei Sette, Italy, 2009
- Letizia Battaglia: Breaking The Code Of Silence, Open Eye Gallery, Liverpool, UK, 2014
- Cantieri Culturali alla Zisa, Palermo, Sicily, 2016
- Letizia Battaglia, Vintage Prints, Galleria del Cembalo, Rome, Italy, 2022
- Life, Love and Death in Sicily, Fotomuseum Den Haag, The Netherlands, 2026

== In film and television ==
- Battaglia (2003) – documentary directed by Daniela Zanzotto about Battaglia's life and work.
- Excellent Cadavers (2005) – documentary directed by Marco Turco and based on the 1995 book by Alexander Stille. Battaglia appears as a witness to the Mafia killings in Palermo.
- Palermo Shooting (2008) – film directed by Wim Wenders, in which Battaglia made a cameo appearance as a photographer.
- Letizia Battaglia – Amore Amaro (2012) – documentary directed by Francesco Raganato.
- La mia Battaglia (2016) – documentary directed by Franco Maresco, centred on a conversation between Maresco and Battaglia about photography, Palermo, life and death.
- La mafia non è più quella di una volta (2019) – documentary directed by Franco Maresco, featuring Battaglia and Ciccio Mira. It premiered in competition at the 76th Venice International Film Festival.
- Shooting the Mafia (2019) – documentary directed by Kim Longinotto about Battaglia's life and career.
- Solo per passione – Letizia Battaglia fotografa (2022) – biographical television miniseries created and directed by Roberto Andò, with Isabella Ragonese portraying Battaglia.
- Letizia Battaglia, photographe des années de sang (2024) – documentary directed by Cécile Allegra about Battaglia's life and work, broadcast on France 5 in 2025.

== Awards ==
- 1985: W. Eugene Smith Grant in Humanistic Photography
- 1999: Photography Lifetime Achievement of the Mother Jones International Fund for Documentary Photography
- 2007: Dr. Erich Salomon Award, a 'lifetime achievement' award of the German Society for Photography (DGPh)
- 2009: Cornell Capa Infinity Award by the International Center of Photography, New York City
