= Change (film) =

2010 documentary film by Matteo Barzini

Change is a feature-length documentary film about the Barack Obama - John McCain 2008 United States presidential election directed by Matteo Barzini and produced by Lorenzo Ambrogio & Feel Film. It premiered May 15, 2010 at Rome Independent Film Festival. It was later distributed by Cinecittà Luce.

== Plot ==
The author travels back from Italy to America where he moved to at the age of 12 and lived until he was 18. These crucial years of his life spent in Los Angeles have forever shaped his persona, and created a strong identity crisis within him. He decides to deal with his past by embarking in a journey across the United States during the 40 days prior to America's most crucial and heartfelt elections: Obama vs McCain.

Change is an inside look at the political rallies, the concerts, the events, the controversies, the hopes and fears of a struggling country through the lens of a man looking to find himself and the country that raised him.

== Cast ==
- Tomas Young as himself
- Barack Obama as himself
- Sarah Palin as herself
- John McCain as himself
- John Kerry as himself
- Joe Biden as himself
- Naomi Judd as herself
- Jay-Z as himself
- Rev. Arnold Conrad as himself
- Adam Navarro as himself
- Matteo Barzini as himself

== Reception ==
The documentary received positive reviews. Il Venerdì di Repubblica dedicated a long interview to director Matteo Barzini and a thorough review of the documentary as part of its cover article on their November 2008 Issue. It stated: “Change is a journey in the heart of America during a presidential campaign which gave hope back to americans”.

Italy's largest selling newspaper Corriere Della Sera quoted Change as "Noteworthy" and the online film magazine 35mm.it stated "Change is timely and dynamic, at times reminding us of good ol’ Michael Moore.”
