= 60th Venice International Film Festival =

Italian film festival in 2003

- Festival Poster
- Opening film: Anything Else
- Location: Venice, Italy
- Founded: 1932
- Awards: Golden Lion: The Return
- Hosted by: Alessandra Martines
- Artistic director: Moritz de Hadeln
- Festival date: 27 August – 6 September 2003
- Website: Website

Venice Film Festival chronology
- 61st 59th

The 60th annual Venice International Film Festival was held from 27 August to 6 September 2003, at Venice Lido in Italy.

Italian filmmaker Mario Monicelli was the Jury President of the main competition. The Golden Lion was awarded to The Return by Andrey Zvyagintsev.

The festival opened with Anything Else by Woody Allen.

== Juries ==
=== Main Competition (Venezia 60) ===
- Mario Monicelli, Italian filmmaker - Jury President
- Stefano Accorsi, Italian actor
- Michael Ballhaus, German cinematographer
- Ann Hui, Chinese director
- Pierre Jolivet, French director, actor, screenwriter, and producer
- Monty Montgomery, American actor and filmmaker
- Assumpta Serna, Spanish actress

=== Upstream (Controcorrente) ===
The following people were selected to confer the San Marco Prize for best film, the Special Director's Award, an Upstream Prize for Best Actor, and one for Best Actress:

- Laure Adler, French Journalist - Jury President
- Vito Amoruso, Italian literary critic
- Samir Farid, Egyptian film critic
- Rene Liu, Taiwanese singer-songwriter, actress, director and writer
- Ulrich Tukur, German actor

=== Luigi De Laurentiis Award for a Debut Feature ===
- Lia van Leer, Israeli founder of the Haifa Cinematheque, the Jerusalem Cinematheque's Israel Film Archive, and the Jerusalem Film Festival - Jury President
- Jannike Ahlund, Swedish film critic
- Pierre-Henri Deleau, French film producer and actor
- Stefan Kitanov, Bulgarian film producer
- Peter Scarlet, executive director of Tribeca Festival

== Official Sections ==
=== In Competition ===
The following films were nominated to compete for the Golden Lion of the 60th edition of the festival:

English title	Original title	Director(s)	Production country
21 Grams		Alejandro González Iñárritu	United States
Alila		Amos Gitai	Israel, France
Code 46		Michael Winterbottom	United Kingdom
Feelings	Les Sentiments	Noémie Lvovsky	France
The Floating Landscape	戀之風景	Carol Lai	Hong Kong, France
A Good Lawyer's Wife	바람난 가족	Im Sang-soo	South Korea
Good Morning, Night	Buongiorno, notte	Marco Bellocchio	Italy
Goodbye, Dragon Inn	不散	Tsai Ming-liang	Taiwan
Imagining Argentina		Christopher Hampton	Spain, United Kingdom, United States
The Kite	طيّارة من ورق	Randa Chahal Sabag	Lebanon
Loving Glances	Sjaj u očima	Srđan Karanović	Serbia and Montenegro, United Kingdom
The Miracle	Il Miracolo	Edoardo Winspeare	Italy
Pornografia		Jan Jakub Kolski	Poland, France
Raja		Jacques Doillon	France, Morocco
The Return	Возвращение	Andrey Zvyagintsev	Russia
Rosenstrasse		Margarethe von Trotta	Germany, Netherlands
Secret File	Segreti di Stato	Paolo Benvenuti	Italy
A Talking Picture	Um Filme Falado	Manoel de Oliveira	Portugal
Twentynine Palms		Bruno Dumont	France, Germany, United States
Zatôichi	座頭市	Takeshi Kitano	Japan

=== Out of Competition ===
The following films were screened as Out of Competition:

English title	Original title	Director(s)	Production country
Anything Else (opening film)		Woody Allen	United States
Coffee and Cigarettes		Jim Jarmusch	United States
Intolerable Cruelty		Joel Coen	United States
Le Divorce		James Ivory	United Kingdom, United States, France
Matchstick Men		Ridley Scott	United States, United Kingdom
Monsieur Ibrahim	Monsieur Ibrahim et le fleurs du Coran	François Dupeyron	France
Once Upon a Time in Mexico		Robert Rodriguez	United States
The Dreamers		Bernardo Bertolucci	Italy, United Kingdom, France
The Human Stain		Robert Benton	United States, Germany
Special Events
The Blues - Feel Like Going Home		Martin Scorsese	United States
The Blues - Godfathers and Sons		Marc Levin	United States
The Blues - Red, White and Blues		Mike Figgis	United States
The Blues - The Road To Memphis		Richard Pearce	United States

=== Upstream (Controcorrente) ===
A section of the official selection for feature films that stand out for their "innovative intent, creative originality or alternative cinematographic languages"

English title	Original title	Director(s)	Production country
Antenna	Antena	Kazuyoshi Kumakiri	Japan
The Assassinated Sun	Le soleil assassiné	Abdelkrim Bahloul	France
Break Free	Liberi	Gianluca Maria Tavarelli	Italy
Casa de los babys		John Sayles	United States, Mexico
The Chimera of Heroes	La quimera de los heroes	Daniel Rosenfeld	Argentina, France, Denmark
The First Letter	Abjad	Abolfazl Jalili	Iran, France, Italy
The Five Obstructions	De Fem Benspaend	Jørgen Leth and Lars Von Trier	Denmark, Switzerland, Belgium, France
In the Forest... Again	Abar Aranye	Goutam Ghose	India
Last Life in the Universe	เรื่องรัก น้อยนิด มหาศาล	Pen-ek Ratanaruang	Thailand, Hong Kong, Netherlands, United States, Japan
Lost in Translation		Sofia Coppola	United States, Japan
Mud	Çamur	Derviş Zaim	Italy, Cyprus
A Place Among the Living	Une place parmi les vivants	Raoul Ruiz	France, Romania
The Python	Pitons	Laila Pakalnina	Latvia
The Return of Cagliostro	Il ritorno di Cagliostro	Daniele Ciprì, Franco Maresco	Italy
Schultze Gets the Blues		Michael Schorr	Germany
Silence Between Two Thoughts	Sokoote beine do fekr	Babak Payami	Iran
Travellers and Magicians	ཆང་ཧུབ་ཐེངས་གཅིག་གི་འཁྲུལ་སྣང	Khyentse Norbu	Bhutan, United Kingdom
Vodka Lemon		Hiner Saleem	France, Italy, Switzerland, Armenia
Special Event
The Tulse Luper Suitcases: Antwerp		Peter Greenaway	United Kingdom

=== New Territories ===
The following films were selected for the New Territories (Nuovi Territori) section:

Feature films - Fiction
English title	Original title	Director(s)	Production country
Pequeña paloma blanca		Christian Barbe	Chile, United Kingdom
Threads	Khahit errouh	Hakim Belabbes	Morocco, United States
Vibrator	ヴァイブレータ	Ryūichi Hiroki	Japan
L'ultimo piano		Paolo Scarfò	Italy
Le dernier des immobiles		Nicola Sornaga	France
Chemical Hunger	Fame chimica	Antonio Bocola, Paolo Vari	Italy, Switzerland
Feature films - Non Fiction
Mattatoio		Akab (Gabriele Di Benedetto)	Italy
L'uomo segreto		Nino Bizzarri	Italy
Back to Kotelnich	Retour à Kotelnitch	Emmanuel Carrère	France
Mists	Brumas	Ricardo Costa	Portugal
At School	A scuola	Leonardo Di Costanzo	France, Italy
War	Guerra	Pippo Delbono	Italy, Israel, Palestine
Italian sud est		Fluid Video Crew	Italy
Materiali a confronto		Giuseppe M. Gaudino	Italy
Un instante en la vida ajena		Jose Luis López-Linares	Spain
Counter Site	Contr@site	Fausta Quattrini, Daniele Incalcaterra	Argentina, Switzerland
Prisoner of the Iron Bars	O Prisioneiro da Grade de Ferro	Paulo Sacramento	Brazil
On n'est pas des marques de vélo		Jean-Pierre Thorn	France
Barefoot to Herat	Paberahne Ta Harat	Majid Majidi	Iran
Medium-length Films
United We Stand		Matteo Barzini	Italy
Un fils		Amal Bedjaoui	France
Sorriso amaro		Matteo Bellizzi	Italy, Finland, Switzerland
Segni particolari - Appunti per un film sull'Emilia Romagna		Giuseppe Bertolucci	Italy
My Father's Garden		Matthew Brown	Italy, South Africa
Il senso del mistero		Paolo Brunatto	Italy
Picciridda		Alberto Castiglione	Italy
Stessa rabbia, stessa primavera		Stefano Incerti	Italy
Maledetta mia		Wilma Labate	Italy
The Malady of Death	La Maladie de la Mort	Asa Mader	France, United States
Paesaggio a Sud		Vincenzo Marra	Italy
Margherita. Ritratto Confidenziale		Giuseppe Piccioni	Italy
Senza tregua		Marco Pozzi	Italy
Short Films
Poem		Carlos Armella	United Kingdom
Chaplin Aujourd'hui - The Kid		Alain Bergala	France
Japan-eno - Stornmi # 3 - Clessiquidre hz FX - China #4 FX - A...B...C...cletta - CoplanDesideri - Occhi di-visi Occhi di-versi		Ermanno De Biagi	Italy
The Time We Lost		Tommaso Cammarano	Italy, United States
Lo stuoino di pietra		Gina Carducci	Italy, United States
Pequeñas voces		Eduardo Carrillo	Colombia, United Kingdom, Spain
Ssst		Pietro Durante, Lisa Ferlazzo Natoli	Italy
Structural Filmwaste. Dissolution 1		Siegfried A. Fruhauf	Austria
La recherche de ma mère		Paola Gandolfi, Francesca Ravello	Italy
Ne dites pas à ma mère		Sarah Moon Howe	Belgium, France
Libberato		Davide Lombardi	Italy
La spia che era in me		Mario Materia	Italy
Prises de vues		Sebastian Meise	Austria
Relojes de arena		José Francisco Ortuno, Laura Alvea	Spain
The Affirmation of Jimmy Brown		Robert Pasternak	Canada
My McQueen		Lourdes Portillo	United States
Racconti per l'isola		Costanza Quatriglio	Italy
Grande anarca		Alvise Renzini	Italy
Fantasmi di voce - Antonio Stagnoli		Elisabetta Sgarbi	Italy
You Are Evil		Louis Taylor	Canada
Shen-Zi		Nell Yen-ni Wang, Jin-yi Liu	Taiwan
Special Events
The Agronomist		Jonathan Demme	United States
The Saddest Music in the World		Guy Maddin	Canada
Persona non grata		Oliver Stone	United States, France, Spain

=== Short Film Competition ===
The following films, whose length does not exceed 30 minutes, were selected for the short film competition:

Title	Director(s)	Production country
In competition
El excusado	Lorenza Manrique	Mexico
From Where I'm Standing	Annalise Patterson	New Zealand
God's Kitchen	Paki Smith	Ireland
Hochbetrieb	Andreas Krein	Germany
Match	Jef Nassenstein	Netherlands
Neft (The Oil)	Murad Ibragimbekov	Russia, Azerbaijan
Neon Eyes	Thomas Gerhold, Markus Wambsganss	Germany
Ore 2 Calma Piatta	Marco Pontecorvo	Italy
Ritterschlag	Sven Martin	Germany
Solitaire	Thor Bekkavik	Norway
The Trumouse Show	Julio Robledo	Spain
Zippo	Stefano Sollima	Italy
Out of Competition
Destino	Dominique Monféry	France, United States
Le lion volatil	Agnès Varda	France

== Independent Sections ==
=== Venice International Film Critics' Week ===
The following feature films were selected to be screened In Competition for this section:

English title	Original title	Director(s)	Production country
15		Royston Tan	Singapore
Ana and the Others	Ana y los otros	Celina Murga	Argentina
Matrubhoomi		Manish Jha	India
Mr. Butterfly	Nabi	Kim Hyeon-Seong	South Korea
Three-Step Dance	Ballo a tre passi	Salvatore Mereu	Italy
Twist		Jacob Daniel Tierney	Canada
Variété Française		Frédéric Videau	France

== Official Awards ==
- Golden Lion:The Return by Andrey Zvyagintsev
- Silver Lion for Best Director: Takeshi Kitano for Zatōichi
- Grand Special Jury Prize: The Kite by Randa Chahal
- Volpi Cup for Best Actor: Sean Penn for 21 Grams
- Volpi Cup for Best Actress: Katja Riemann for Rosenstrasse
- Marcello Mastroianni Award: Najat Benssallem for Raja

=== Golden Lion Honorary Award ===
- Dino De Laurentiis
- Omar Sharif

=== Short Film Competition ===
- Silver Lion for Best Short Film: Neft (The Oil) by Murad Ibragimbekov
- UIP Award for Best European Short Film: The Trumouse Show by Julio Robledo
  - Special mention: Hochbetrieb by Andreas Krein

== Independent Awards ==
The following collateral awards were conferred to films of the official selection:

=== FIPRESCI Award ===
- Venezia 60: Goodbye Dragon Inn by Tsai Ming-liang
- Parallel Section: Matrubhoomi by Manish Jha
