= Matteo Barzini =

Italian filmmaker and producer

Matteo Barzini (born 1981 in Rome, raised in Los Angeles) is an Italian journalist, filmmaker and producer. He has worked for over two decades across cinema, television and international reportage, focusing on politics, social issues and contemporary conflicts. His documentary films have been selected at international film festivals, including the Venice International Film Festival, and broadcast on major television networks. From 2016 to 2023, he worked as a television reporter for the Italian current affairs program Agorà on Rai.

== Biography ==
His first feature documentary United We Stand, about post 9/11 America and the War in Iraq, was selected for the 60th Venice International Film Festival, making him one of the youngest filmmakers to attend the festival.

In 2008 he produced and directed his second feature documentary Change, about the Obama McCain United States presidential election in 2008. The documentary was distributed by Cinecittà Luce and was in competition for the David di Donatello 2010/11.

In 2013 he co-directed his third feature documentary Medè about the Camorra in Naples. It premiered at Rome Independent Film Festival on April 9, 2012.

In 2014 he directed the documentary about the Syrian Civil War: The Quake. The soundtrack was scored by Academy Award winner, composer Ennio Morricone. The film premiered on February 8, 2014 during the Roman premiere of George Clooney's film Monuments Men. The film was later screened at the Symposium on Art and Terrorism at the Courtauld Institute of Art in London and at the Museo Nazionale di Palazzo Venezia, and was featured by the Association for Research into Crimes against Art (ARCA) in relation to discussions on cultural heritage and conflict. It was part of the Brown University Modern Culture and Media course "The Collapse of the Nation-State System: An Intellectual Preparation" held by Rana Dasgupta. MAXXI – National Museum of the 21st Century Arts paid homage to Ennio Morricone after his death by screening The Quake on a continuous loop for two days.

He worked as a reporter for the Italian current affairs television program Agorà broadcast on Rai. In 2019, while covering the Yellow Vests protests in Paris, he was injured in the Paris explosion which killed four people and injured 47.

== Filmography ==
Feature documentaries
United We Stand
Change
Medè (Mayday)
The Quake

== Awards and festivals ==
Venice International Film Festival (2003) Official Selection United We Stand

New York International Independent Film and Video Festival (2004) Honorable Mention United We Stand

Potenza International Film Festival (2004) Official Selection United We Stand

Rome DocFest (2006) Best Editing Hip Hop Diaries

Rome Independent Film Festival (2010) Official Selection Change

Potenza International Film Festival (2010) Official Selection Change

Rome Independent Film Festival (2013) Official Selection Medè (Mayday)
