= Vincenzo Vecchi =

Italian anarchist

- Born: 12 May 1970 (age 55); Calcinate, Italy
- Occupations: Anarchist and gardener

Vincenzo Vecchi is an Italian "altermondialist".

== Biography ==
Vecchi was born in Calcinate in the early 1970s. As an adult, he worked as a gardener in Mornico al Serio before moving to Milan, where he became active in local anarchist and environmentalist groups during the 1990s. Since 2011, he has lived in Brittany, in France, where he worked as a building painter.

The 27th G8 summit in Genoa in 2001 was marked by a number of anti-globalization protests, with hundreds of thousands of protestors taking part. The protests saw clashes between police and protestors, as well as a number of raids by police on independent journalists, resulting in dozens of injuries and arrests and claims of police brutality. In mid-March 2006, the neo-fascist Tricolour Flame political party organised a demonstration in Milan, a month before the 2006 Italian general election and just a few days before the third anniversary of the murder of Davide Cesare, an Italian anti-fascist activist who had been stabbed by two members of the far-right in 2003. In response, local anti-fascist groups organised an ad-hoc counter-demonstration, without receiving formal permission from the authorities. When the two demonstrations met each other on the Corso Buenos Aires, violent clashes broke out. Vecchi was present at both protests.

In July 2012, the Italian Supreme Court of Cassation sentenced Vecchi in absentia to eleven and a half years incarceration on charges of having committed "devastation and pillage" during the 2001 and 2006 protests. In August 2019, he was arrested by French police in Saint-Gravé. The arrest sparked controversy, as the charges had been first introduced into Italian law during the 1930s, under the fascist regime of Benito Mussolini, as supporters of Vecchi claimed that the sentencing had been excessive, and as supporters claimed that there was a risk that his case would be used for political purposes by Italian Minister of the Interior Matteo Salvini, leader of the far-right Lega Nord political party. Many other commentators, like the French writer Eric Vuillard, remind that « the European cooperation must not prevail upon Justice » .

In November 2019, the Rennes Court of Appeal ordered his release from detention, ruling that there had been irregularities in the issuing of the European Arrest Warrant for him. In November 2020, the Angers Court of Appeal refused an extradition order for Vecchi, ruling that the charges of "devastation and pillage" had no equivalent in France and that the Italian court had not clearly proved that he was complicit in several of the incidents that it had charged him for. In 2021, the French Court of Cassation referred the case to the Court of Justice of the European Union. In July 2022, this European Court of Justice gives its opinion : in spite of the two previous judgements of Rennes and Angers, it maintains that the differences between the definitions of criminal infractions in the different European countries are not sufficient reasons and that Vecchi should therefore be extradited. In the followings weeks, a lot of protestations against this position are raised among French political and intellectual circles, notably, in late September, a communiqué from la « Ligue des Droits de l’Homme » (League for the Human Rights). In early October, several Op-ed articles are published in French and Belgium daily papers, particularly the column in "Le Monde" co-signed by the French writer and Nobel laureate Annie Ernaux.

On 11 October 2022, the Paris Court of Cassation took place in order to decide whether Vincenzo Vecchi must, or not, be extradited to Italy. The case is under advisement, the judgment having to be handed down on 29 November 2022.
