= Bravo Bene! =

2025 film by Franco Maresco

- Theatrical release poster
- Italian: Un film fatto per Bene
- Directed by: Franco Maresco
- Screenplay by: Franco Maresco; Claudia Uzzo; Umberto Cantone; Francesco Guttuso
- Story by: Franco Maresco; Claudia Uzzo
- Produced by: Andrea Occhipinti; Marco Alessi; Beatrice Bulgari (collaboration)
- Cinematography: Alessandro Abate
- Edited by: Paola Freddi; Francesco Guttuso
- Music by: Salvatore Bonafede
- Production companies: Lucky Red; Dugong Films; Eolo Films Productions
- Distributed by: Lucky Red
- Release date: 5 September 2025 (Venice)
- Running time: 100 minutes
- Country: Italy
- Language: Italian

Bravo Bene! (Italian: Un film fatto per Bene, lit. 'A film made for Bene') is a 2025 Italian mockumentary film directed by Franco Maresco. It focuses on the director's failed attempts to film a project about Italian actor, filmmaker and poet Carmelo Bene (1937–2002).

The film had its world premiere in the main competition of the 82nd Venice International Film Festival on 5 September 2025, where it was nominated for the Golden Lion. It was theatrically released in Italy on the same day by Lucky Red.

== Plot ==
"A film within a film", Italian filmmaker Franco Maresco is in the middle of shooting a new feature film about Carmelo Bene (1937–2002), one of the leading figures of neo-avant-garde Italian theater and cinema, due to various setbacks shooting is repeated delayed. Frustrated, producer Andrea Occhipinti decides to abandon the project. An angry Maresco accuses the production team of "filmicide" (film suicide) and resigns. Screenwriter Umberto Cantone, a close friend of the director, searches for a solution inviting everyone involved to testify in an investigation, shedding light on Maresco's personality and ideas. There is speculation that the offended Maresco may have been finishing the film on his own in the meantime. This, he says, is "the only way" to express his anger and horror at the failed project.

== Cast ==
- Carmelo Bene (archive footage)
- Umberto Cantone
- Franco Maresco
- Francesco Conticelli
- Marco Alessi
- Bernardo Greco
- Francesco Puma
- Saverio D'Amico
- Toti Mancuso
- Giuseppe Lo Piccolo
- Riccardo Eggshell
- Ernesto Tomasini
- Aurora Falcone
- Matteo Capogna
- Antonino Lo Gelfo
- Antonino Lo Verso
- Luisa Viglietti
- Lorenzo Caracausi
- Eliseo Verso
- Ciccio Mira
- Gino Carista
- Melino Imparato
- Antonio Rezza

== Production ==
Bravo Bene! is the 48th directorial work by Franco Maresco. He wrote the screenplay together with Umberto Cantone, Claudia Uzzo, and Francesco Guttuso. In addition to Maresco and Cantone, the film also stars producer Marco Alessi and actors Giuseppe Lo Piccolo, Gino Carista, Melino Imparato, and Antonio Rezza. Alessandro Abate served as cinematographer, while Paolo Freddi and Francesco Guttoso were responsible for the editing. Guttoso had worked on Maresco's previous film The Mafia Is No Longer What It Used to Be (2019). The score was composed by jazz pianist Salvatore Bonafede.

The film was produced by Andrea Occhipinti for Lucky Red, together with Marco Alessi for Dugong Films and Daniele Occhipinti for Eolo Films Productions. The film project was supported by, among others, the Italian Ministry of Culture.

== Release ==
Bravo Bene! was selected to compete for the Golden Lion at the 82nd Venice International Film Festival, where it had its world premiere on 5 September 2025. It is Maresco's second invitation to the competition following his film The Mafia Is No Longer What It Used to Be in 2019.

International sales are handled by True Colours. The film was theatrically released in Italy on 5 September 2025, distributed by Lucky Red.

== Accolades ==
Award	Date of ceremony	Category	Recipient(s)	Result	Ref.
Venice Film Festival	6 September 2025	Golden Lion	Franco Maresco	Nominated	
71° David di Donatello	6 May 2026	Best Production	Marco Alessi	Nominated	
