= Daphne Scoccia =

Italian actress

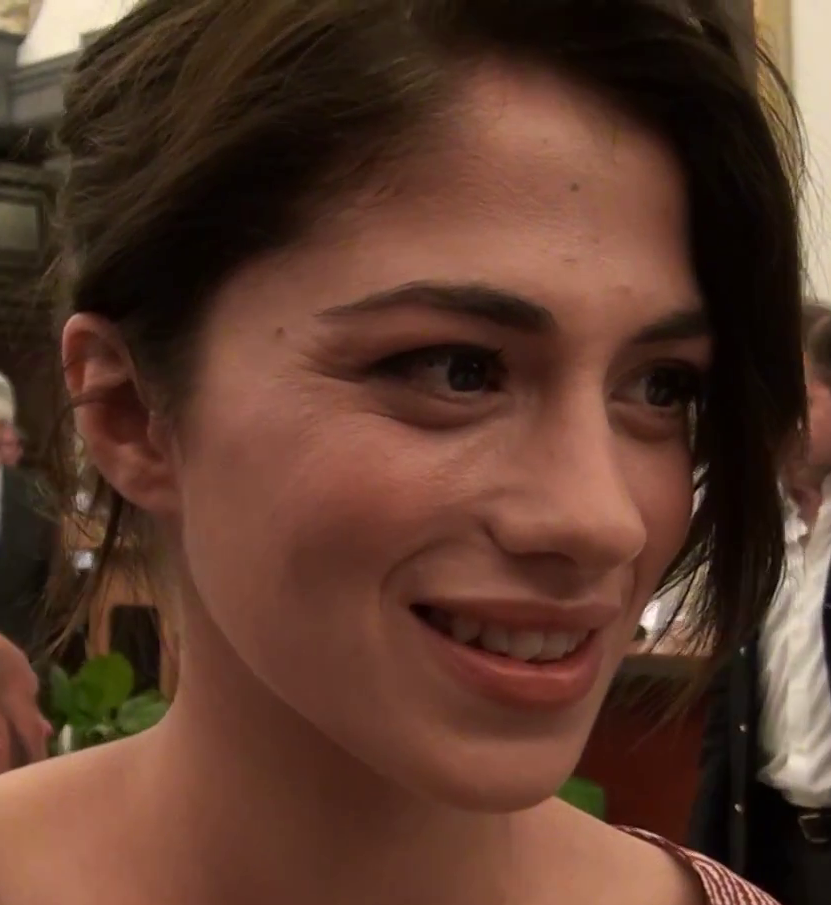
- Born: 31 March 1995 (age 30); San Benedetto del Tronto, Italy
- Occupation: Actress

Daphne Scoccia (born 31 March 1995) is an Italian actress.

== Life and career ==
Born in San Benedetto del Tronto, after dropping out of school prematurely, Scoccia moved to Rome, where she did numerous low paid jobs. While working as a waitress in a Monteverde tavern, she was noticed by the director Claudio Giovannesi and invited to audition for the lead role in Fiore, a role she eventually got. For her performance in this film Scoccia won the Ciak D'Oro for revelation of the year and the Nastro d'Argento for best new actress, and was nominated for David di Donatello for Best Actress.

== Filmography ==
=== Film ===
Year	Title	Role(s)	Notes
2016	Fiore	Daphne Bonori	
2017	Niente di serio	Matilde	
2019	Il colpo del cane	Marti	
2019	Citizens of the World	Fiorella	
2020	Nel bagno delle donne	Valeria	
2020	La danza nera	Grazia	
2020	Palazzo di giustizia	Angelina	
2023	Il meglio di te	Sara	
2023	Rido perché ti amo	Sam	
2025	Fuori	Ottavia	

=== Television ===
Year	Title	Role(s)	Notes
2018	The Wonder	Asia	2 episodes
2018–2022	Carlo & Malik	Ottavia Danti	Recurring role (season 1-3)
2019	Imma Tataranni: Deputy Prosecutor	Milena Amoroso	Episode: "Come piante fra i sassi"
