= United We Stand (2003 film) =

- Directed by: Matteo Barzini
- Written by: Matteo Barzini
- Produced by: Andrea Barzini
- Cinematography: Ben Shulz
- Edited by: Matteo Barzini
- Production companies: Feel Film; Tipota Movie Company
- Distributed by: Documè
- Release date: 4 September 2003
- Running time: 50 minutes
- Country: Italy
- Language: English

United We Stand is a 2003 feature documentary directed by Matteo Barzini about America's reactions to 9/11 and the Iraq War. The documentary was presented in the New Territories section of the official selection at the 2003 Venice International Film Festival.

== Plot ==
During, and immediately after the war in Iraq, a fim crew travelled six thousand miles from Chicago to Los Angeles, via Dallas and Las Vegas, (with a final brief visit to New York), gathering interviews on the road about the war. The responses, often shocking, sometimes violent, appalled, heartfelt, but never banal, show the radical pro and anti-war polarization of a country, and give an updated and unusual image of what America has become since 11 September 2001.

== Awards and festivals ==
2003 Venice International Film Festival
2004 New York International Independent Film and Video Festival Honorable Mention
2004 Potenza International film festival

== Critics ==
La Repubblica wrote: "From Chicago to Los Angeles, 6000 km of interviews on the war in Iraq give us an updated and unusual image of America today." Cinecittà News wrote: "What emerges from the film is the polarization between Iraq War supporters, who declare 'Kill as many as you can' and Americans outraged by the death of many civilians in the name of oil: 'We have enslaved Iraq'". Libero called United We Stand "A long journey in the deep heart of the United States."
