= 2003 in Italian television =

This is a list of Italian television related events from 2003.

== Events ==
- 8 May – Floriana Secondi wins season 3 of Grande Fratello.

== Debuts ==
=== Serials ===
- Corto Maltese – cartoon from the Hugo Pratt's comic; coproduction with France.

=== International ===
- 19 March – (United States) Scrubs (MTV) (2001–2010)
- October – (France) / (Canada) / (United Kingdom) The Adventures of Paddington Bear (Italia 1) (1997–2000)
- Unknown – (United States) Garfield and Friends (RaiSat2) (1988–1994)

== Television shows ==
=== Miniseries ===
- The best of youth – by Marco Tullio Giordana, with Luigi Lo Cascio, Alessio Boni, Jasmine Trinca, Adriana Asti; 4 episodes. It's a family saga telling the Italian history from the Sixties to 2000, through the lives of two brothers (a policeman and a progressive intellectual); distributed also in a theatrical version, with international success.

=== Mediaset ===
- Grande Fratello (2000–present)

== Networks and services ==
=== Launches ===
Network	Type	Launch date	Notes	Source
Music Box Italia	Cable and satellite	Unknown		
Padre Pio TV	Cable and satellite	Unknown		
Boomerang	Cable and satellite	31 July		
Fox	Cable and satellite	31 July		
Sky Sport Arena	Cable and satellite	31 July		
Sky Sport Uno	Cable and satellite	31 July		
Sky TG24	Cable and satellite	31 August		
MTV Brand New	Cable and satellite	14 September		

== Deaths ==
- 24 February: Alberto Sordi, 82, comic actor; also if moreover active in radio and cinema, he often appeared in TV variety as guest of honor.

== See also ==
- 2003 in Italy
- List of Italian films of 2003
