= Hey Joe (film) =

2024 film by Claudio Giovannesi

- Italian theatrical release poster
- Directed by: Claudio Giovannesi
- Written by: Claudio Giovannesi; Maurizio Braucci; Massimo Gaudioso
- Produced by: Carlo Degli Esposti; Nicola Serra
- Starring: James Franco; Francesco Di Napoli; Giulia Ercolini; Aniello Arena; Gabriel Riley Hill Antunes; Giada Savi; Francesca Montuori; Donovan W. White
- Cinematography: Daniele Ciprì
- Edited by: Giuseppe Trepiccione
- Music by: Andrea Moscianese; Claudio Giovannesi
- Production companies: Palomar; Rai Cinema
- Distributed by: Vision Distribution
- Release dates: 25 October 2024 (Rome); 28 November 2024 (Italy)
- Country: Italy
- Language: Italian

Hey Joe is a 2024 Italian drama film directed by Claudio Giovannesi. It stars James Franco, Francesco Di Napoli, Giulia Ercolini, and Aniello Arena. It premiered at the 19th Rome Film Festival on 25 October 2024 and received a theatrical release in Italy on 28 November 2024.

== Premise ==
An American World War II veteran returns to Naples after 25 years to get to know his son.

== Cast ==
- James Franco as Dean Barry
  - Gabriel Riley Hill Antunes as young Dean
- Francesco Di Napoli as Enzo
- Giulia Ercolini as Bambi
- Aniello Arena as Don Vittorio
- Giada Savi as Lucia
- Francesca Montuori as Nunzia
- Donovan W. White

== Production ==
The film was announced on 19 October 2023, with James Franco, Francesco Di Napoli, Giulia Ercolini, Aniello Arena, and Francesca Montuori attached to star. Franco had been approached for the film after meeting Maurizio Braucci, one of the film's screenwriters.

Principal photography took place in Naples, Procida, Taranto, and Pizzo. Filming was completed by December 2023.

== Release ==
The film premiered at the 19th Rome Film Festival on 25 October 2024. It received a theatrical release in Italy on 28 November 2024. In late May 2025, Glass House Distribution acquired the film for distribution in North America.

== Reception ==
Camillo De Marco of Cineuropa wrote that the film "offers beautiful lyrical moments but characters that aren't studied in depth". He further wrote, "It is a shame that the script ... indulges in some simplifications and doesn’t manage to significantly deepen the characters, leaving the spectator with a feeling of irresolution that the consolatory ending doesn’t redeem."

== Awards and nominations ==
Award	Year	Category	Recipient(s)	Result	Ref.
David di Donatello	2025	Best Cinematography	Daniele Ciprì	Nominated	
Nastri d'Argento	2025	Best Original Story	Maurizio Braucci, Claudio Giovannesi, Sergio Vitolo	Nominated	
Nastri d'Argento	2025	Best Cinematography	Daniele Ciprì	Nominated	
Nastri d'Argento	2025	Best Sound	Angelo Bonanni	Won	
