= Calcinate =

- Comune
- Comune di Calcinate
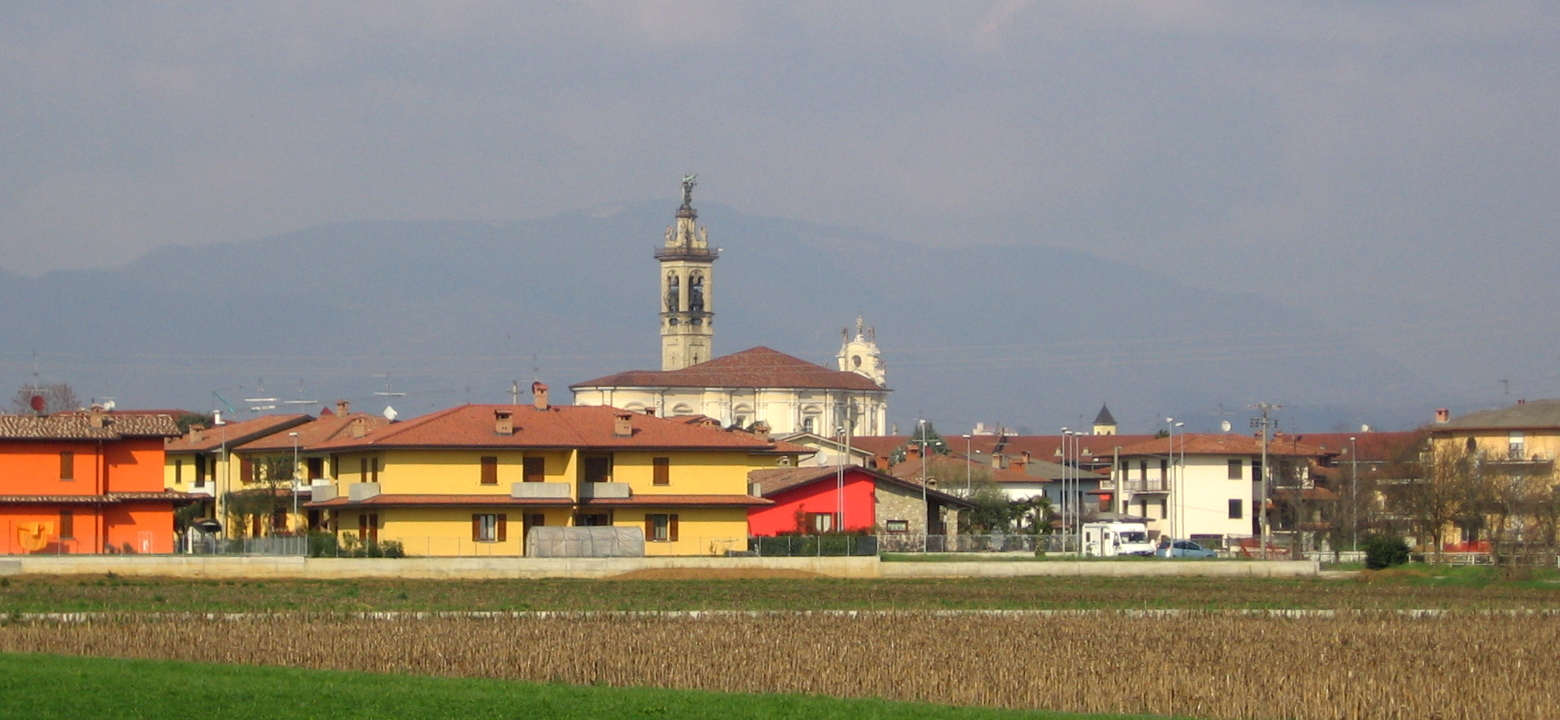
- Calcinate

- Coat of arms

- Location within Italy Location within Lombardy
- Coordinates: 45°37′N 9°48′E
- Country: Italy
- Region: Lombardy
- Province: Bergamo (BG)

Government
  - Mayor: Angelo Orlando

Area
  - Total: 14 km^{2} (5.4 sq mi)
- Elevation: 186 m (610 ft)

Population (31 May 2021)
  - Total: 5,963
  - Density: 430/km^{2} (1,100/sq mi)
- Demonym: Calcinatesi
- Time zone: UTC+1 (CET)
  - Summer (DST): UTC+2 (CEST)
- Postal code: 24050
- Dialing code: 035
- Patron saint: Saint Mary of the Assumption
- Saint day: June 29
- Website: Official website

Calcinate (Bergamasque: Calsinàt) is a town and comune in the province of Bergamo, Lombardy, northern Italy. Its economy is mostly based on industry.

== History ==
The origin of the town are Gaulish and Roman, though it is first mentioned in a document from 1148. It was conquered by the Republic of Venice in the 15th century, and remained to it until 1797. In that period it became a flourishing agricultural centre.

== Main sights ==
- Santa Maria Assunta - baroque parish church
- San Martino (c. 14th century) - romanesque church

== People ==
- Pietro Vierchowod (born 1959), footballer for Sampdoria, Roma and Milan
- Manolo Gabbiadini (born 1991), footballer for Sampdoria
- Melania Gabbiadini (born 1983), retired footballer for Verona
- Andrea Belotti (born 1993), footballer for Torino
- Vincenzo Vecchi (born 1970), anarchist.
