= Piranhas (2019 film) =

2019 film

- Film poster
- Directed by: Claudio Giovannesi
- Written by: Claudio Giovannesi; Roberto Saviano; Maurizio Braucci
- Based on: The Piranhas: The Boy Bosses of Naples; 2018 novel by Roberto Saviano
- Produced by: Carlo Degli Esposti; Nicola Serra
- Cinematography: Daniele Ciprì
- Edited by: Giuseppe Trepiccione
- Music by: Andrea Moscianese; Claudio Giovannesi
- Distributed by: Vision Distribution
- Release date: 12 February 2019 (Berlin)
- Running time: 105 minutes
- Country: Italy
- Languages: Italian; Neapolitan
- Box office: $2,285,086

Piranhas (Italian: La paranza dei bambini, lit. 'The trawler of children') is a 2019 Italian crime drama film directed by Claudio Giovannesi. It was selected to compete for the Golden Bear at the 69th Berlin International Film Festival, where it won the Silver Bear for Best Screenplay.

== Plot ==
A group of 15-year-old boys from the neighbourhood Rione Sanità in Naples, dreaming to gain power and easy money, make their way on to the city's world of crime. In the unconsciousness of their age, they live between good and evil deeds, thinking that crime can be their only chance of life.

== Cast ==
- Francesco Di Napoli as Nicola
- Viviana Aprea as Letizia
- Alfredo Turitto as Biscottino
- Ar Tem as Tyson
- Carmine Pizzo as Limone
- Ciro Pellechia as Lollipop
- Ciro Vecchione as 'O Russ
- Luca Nacarlo as Cristian
- Mattia Piano Del Balzo as Briatò
- Pasquale Marotta as Agostino Striano
- Valentina Vannino as Nicola's mother
- Adam Jendoubi as Aucelluzzo

== Reception ==
The film received critical acclaim at the 69th Berlin International Film Festival. The review aggregator website Rotten Tomatoes reported that 58% of critics have given the film a positive review based on 36 reviews, with an average rating of 5.7/10. The site's critical consensus reads, "Piranhas fails to be anything more than another run-of-the-mill gangster drama." On Metacritic, the film has a weighted average score of 57 out of 100 based on 13 critics, indicating "mixed or average reviews". The Upcoming gave it five stars out of five.
