= Ciprì & Maresco =

Italian film directors, screenwriters, cinematographers and editors

Daniele Ciprì
- Born: 17 August 1962 (age 63); Palermo, Italy
- Occupations: Film director; screenwriter; cinematographer
- Years active: 1991–present

Franco Maresco
- Born: 5 May 1958 (age 68); Palermo, Italy
- Occupations: Film director; screenwriter; film editor
- Years active: 1992–present

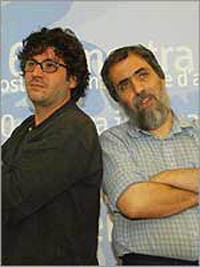
Ciprì & Maresco

Ciprì & Maresco is the name used by the pair of Italian screenwriters and directors Daniele Ciprì (born 17 August 1962) and Franco Maresco (born 5 May 1958).

== Biography ==
The duo started collaborating in 1986, and they became popular with "Cinico TV", a Rai 3 series of 49 black-and-white shorts in which they depicted in a grotesque, comical and visionary style the ordinary life of Palermo suburbs. After making their feature film debut in 1995 with The Uncle from Brooklyn, in 1998 their provocative film Totò che visse due volte caused a stir, being temporarily banned by Italian censorship for blasphemy. Following a third film (the mockumentary The Return of Cagliostro), a documentary about the comedy duo Franco and Ciccio (How We Got the Italian Cinema Into Trouble: Franco & Ciccio's Real Story), and two TV-series for La7, the couple split to pursue solo projects.

== Filmography ==
=== Feature films ===
- The Uncle from Brooklyn (1995)
- Totò che visse due volte (1998)
- The Return of Cagliostro (2003)

=== Documentaries ===
- Loro di Palermo (1990, 13', video)
- Variazioni (1992, 30', video)
- Martin a Little... (1992, 10', video)
- Sicilia da Oscar (1993, 15', video)
- I Castagna sono buoni (1994, 20', video)
- Intervista a Giuseppe De Santis (1994, 38', video)
- Il Gattoparve (1995, 20', video)
- Vittorio De Seta - Lo sguardo in ascolto (1995, 42', video)
- Aspettando Totò (1996, 63', video)
- Grazie Lia - Breve inchiesta su Santa Rosalia (1996, 43', video)
- Intervista a Mario Monicelli (1998, 50', video)
- F. (1999, 5', video)
- Enzo, domani a Palermo! (1999)
- Noi e il Duca - Quando Duke Ellington suonò a Palermo (1999, 85', video)
- Steve Plays Duke (1999, 75', video)
- Arruso (2000, 18', video)
- Tutti for Louis - Omaggio a Louis Armstrong (2000, 60', video)
- La ballata di Salvo (2000, 30', video)
- Miles Gloriosus – Tributo a Miles Davis (2001, 65', video)
- Siamo davvero pietosi (2001, 45', video)
- Conversazione con Sergio Citti (2001, 23', video)
- Che fine ha fatto Pino Grisanti? - Ciprì e Maresco alla ricerca di un maestro incompreso (2003, 30', video)
- How We Got the Italian Cinema Into Trouble: Franco & Ciccio’s Real Story (2004)

=== Shorts and medium length films ===
- Così (1988, 18', video)
- Trinidad (1989, 10', video)
- Pasta e patate (1989, 5', video)
- Romagnolo (1989, 3', video)
- Tantissime domeniche a tutti (1989, 10', video)
- Mai (1989, 4', video)
- Illuminati (1990, 3', video)
- L'Uomo - Il cammino dell'Uomo - La condizione dell'Uomo - La dignità dell'Uomo (1990, 5', video)
- Omaggio a E. (1990, 12', video)
- La Provvidenza (1990, video)
- L'alba del killer (1990, 2', video)
- Onde (1990, 10', video)
- Muri (1990, 4', video)
- L'invasione degli ultrastorpi (1990, video)
- Stanley's Room n°1 e n°2 (1991, 2', video)
- SeicortoSei (1991, 18', video)
- Addio o arrivederci (1991, 4', video)
- Santa Maria (1991, 5', video)
- Home (1991, 3', video)
- Pel di carota (1991, 2', video)
- Verso Vertov: frammenti necropolitani (1991, 6', 16mm)
- Il lato oscuro (1991, 4', video)
- Il corridore della paura (1992, 5', 35mm)
- Venerdì Santo - Sabato Santo - Domenica di Pasqua (1992, 9', video)
- Keller (1992, 3', video)
- Cani (1992, 5', 35mm)
- 23 maggio 1999 (1993, 1', video)
- Senza titolo 1,2,3 (1993, 5', video)
- Pasta e fagioli (1993, 2', video)
- Lontane (1993, 2', video)
- Cucù (1993, 1', video)
- La tombola di Ligeia (1993, 1', video)
- Tre visioni (1993, 5', video)
- Melancholy Lester (1993, 5', video)
- Presepe (1995, 20', video)
- K. (1996, 10', video)
- Il Manocchio (1996, 9', video)
- Ritorno alla vecchia casa (1996, 4', video)
- A Memoria (1996, 38', 35mm)
- Ai Rotoli (1996, 5', video)
- Dieci minuti alla fine (2002, 14', 16mm)
- L'Opé incatenato (2004, 10', video)
- Countdown (2007, 2', video)

=== Television ===
- Blob - CinicoTv (Rai 3, 1992)
- I migliori nani della nostra vita (La7, 2006)
- Ai confini della pietà (La7, 2007)
