= Anything Else =

2003 American film by Woody Allen

- Theatrical release poster
- Directed by: Woody Allen
- Written by: Woody Allen
- Produced by: Letty Aronson
- Starring: Woody Allen; Jason Biggs; Stockard Channing; Danny DeVito; Jimmy Fallon; Christina Ricci
- Cinematography: Darius Khondji
- Edited by: Alisa Lepselter
- Production companies: Perdido Productions; Gravier Productions
- Distributed by: DreamWorks Pictures (United States); Capitol Films (Overseas)
- Release dates: August 27, 2003 (Venice); September 19, 2003 (United States)
- Running time: 108 minutes
- Countries: United States; France
- Language: English
- Budget: $18 million
- Box office: $13.6 million

Anything Else is a 2003 American romantic comedy film written and directed by Woody Allen, produced by Letty Aronson, and starring Allen, Jason Biggs, Stockard Channing, Danny DeVito, Jimmy Fallon, and Christina Ricci. The film premiered as the opening night selection of the 60th Venice International Film Festival. It was released theatrically in the United States on September 19, 2003, to mixed reviews.

== Plot ==
Jerry Falk is a 21-year-old comedy writer living in New York City. Though he earns a living writing material for comedians, he hopes to become a serious novelist and is preoccupied with questions of death, loneliness and the meaning of existence. He is also intensely neurotic and unable to end relationships, remaining with both an unhelpful psychoanalyst and his overbearing manager, Harvey Wexler, largely because he feels guilty about abandoning them.

Jerry befriends David Dobel, a 60-year-old public-school teacher and aspiring comedy writer whom he meets through work. The two begin spending afternoons walking through Central Park, where Dobel offers Jerry eccentric philosophical advice. Intelligent and well-read but increasingly paranoid, Dobel distrusts psychiatry, organized religion and nearly every form of dependence. He tells Jerry that years earlier, while discussing his fears about existence with a taxi driver, the driver responded that life was “like anything else,” a phrase Dobel finds inexplicably profound.

Jerry is living with Amanda Chase, an aspiring actress with whom he is deeply in love. On their anniversary, Amanda arrives late for dinner, announces that she has already eaten, and later tells Jerry that her mother, Paula, will be moving into their apartment. Jerry reluctantly gives up his writing room for Paula despite already struggling to finish his novel and meet his comedy-writing obligations.

Jerry recalls how he met Amanda more than a year earlier, when he was dating Brooke and Amanda was dating his friend Bob. During a double date, Jerry is immediately attracted to Amanda and begins pretending to share virtually all of her interests. He subsequently contacts her under the pretext of taking her to a record store, where they admit their mutual attraction and kiss. They begin an affair, meeting secretly in hotels. Amanda quickly leaves Bob, but Jerry, unable to bring himself to end his own relationship, continues lying to Brooke until she discovers evidence of the affair and leaves him.

Although Jerry and Amanda were initially intensely sexual, their relationship has since deteriorated. Amanda has refused to have sex with him for six months, despite insisting that she loves him, and encourages him to sleep with other women instead. Jerry refuses because he remains obsessed with her. Dobel immediately regards the relationship as destructive and repeatedly tells Jerry that Amanda is probably unfaithful.

Meanwhile, Paula settles into Jerry’s apartment and announces plans to reinvent herself as a nightclub singer. She has a piano delivered, rehearses constantly and pressures Jerry to write material for her act, further disrupting his work. Harvey similarly intrudes on Jerry’s life and pressures him to extend their professional contract for another seven years. Jerry recognizes that both relationships are suffocating him but remains unable to say no to either of them.

Dobel becomes increasingly concerned with self-reliance and personal survival. He persuades Jerry to buy a rifle and assemble an elaborate emergency kit, arguing that civilization is less secure than Jerry imagines. Amanda is appalled by the weapon, while Jerry’s analyst threatens to stop treating him if he keeps it. Dobel’s paranoia is accompanied by a capacity for violence: after two men steal a parking space from him and intimidate him, he later damages their car rather than simply accepting the humiliation.

Hoping to revive their sex life, Jerry persuades Amanda to recreate the excitement of their early relationship by checking into a hotel. When he attempts to become intimate with her, however, Amanda experiences shortness of breath and other physical symptoms, forcing them to summon a doctor. Jerry becomes jealous when the physician appears attracted to her.

Jerry’s suspicions about Amanda increase after she openly flirts with actor Ray Polito. When Jerry discovers that Amanda’s diaphragm is missing, Dobel encourages him to follow her. Jerry eventually spies on Amanda and discovers that she has been sleeping with her acting teacher, Ron Keller. When confronted, Amanda admits the affair but claims that it was essentially therapeutic: because she could no longer become sexually aroused with Jerry, she needed to determine whether she was physically capable of enjoying sex at all. Her experiment was successful. Jerry is devastated, but despite initially declaring the relationship over, he remains with her.

Dobel concludes that Jerry’s fundamental problem is his fear of being alone. In his view, Jerry has surrounded himself with people who make decisions for him: Amanda, Harvey and his psychoanalyst. Dobel proposes that the two make a clean break from New York and move to Los Angeles, where a contact of his can obtain work for them as a television-writing team. The arrangement would allow Jerry to leave his old life without initially having to face being entirely alone.

Jerry gradually decides to accept the plan. He refuses Harvey’s proposed contract extension and announces that he is ending their professional relationship. Harvey reacts hysterically, apparently suffering a medical episode in the restaurant, but survives. Jerry then terminates his psychoanalysis. After spending an evening with Amanda’s friend Connie and realizing for the first time since meeting Amanda that he can be attracted to another woman, Jerry becomes increasingly convinced that leaving New York is possible.

When Jerry finally prepares to tell Amanda that he is moving to Los Angeles, she simultaneously announces that she is leaving him. She claims to have developed feelings for another man and initially insists that she has avoided having an affair with him, before admitting that they have already slept together once to determine whether they were sexually compatible. Rather than collapsing as he once would have, Jerry accepts the breakup and tells her that he is leaving as well. Amanda is delighted by his new opportunity, and the two recognize that their relationship has run its course.

Having finally ended his relationships with Amanda, Harvey and his analyst, Jerry feels both terrified and exhilarated by his newfound independence. His plans change unexpectedly when Dobel summons him to a secluded part of Central Park shortly before their departure. Dobel tells Jerry that he can no longer accompany him to California. He explains that after an altercation with two state troopers, one of whom made an antisemitic remark, he returned home for a weapon, tracked down one of the officers and shot him. Dobel intends to disappear until the situation passes.

Jerry is horrified and initially refuses to go to California without him, but Dobel insists that Jerry no longer needs him and is capable of going alone. Jerry later admits that he never learned whether Dobel’s story was true or whether Dobel invented it specifically to force him to become independent. Jerry never sees or hears from him again.

On the way to JFK Airport, Jerry reflects fondly on Dobel and the strange mixture of terrible and useful advice he gave him. His taxi passes Amanda, who is now with the doctor who treated her during the failed hotel encounter. Seeing her with someone else no longer prevents Jerry from continuing with his own life. He remarks to the taxi driver on the inexplicable mystery of existence. The driver responds that it is “like anything else.”

== Cast ==
- Woody Allen as David Dobel
- Jason Biggs as Jerry Falk
- Stockard Channing as Paula Chase
- Danny DeVito as Harvey Wexler
- Jimmy Fallon as Bob Stiles
- Christina Ricci as Amanda Chase
- Anthony Arkin as Pip's Comic
- David Conrad as Phil Reed
- Adrian Grenier as Ray Polito
- William Hill as Psychiatrist
- Erica Leerhsen as Connie
- Fisher Stevens as Manager
- Joseph Lyle Taylor as Bill
- KaDee Strickland as Brooke
- Diana Krall as herself

== Reception ==
On the review aggregator website Rotten Tomatoes, the film holds an approval rating of 40% based on reviews from 136 critics, with an average rating of 5.3/10. The website's critics consensus states, "Too many elements from better Woody Allen films are being recycled here." Metacritic, which uses a weighted average, assigned the film a score of 43 out of 100, based on 37 critics, indicating "mixed or average" reviews. Audiences surveyed by CinemaScore gave the film a grade C− on scale of A to F.

Roger Ebert of the Chicago Sun-Times gave the film three stars out of four, and wrote: "At a time when so many American movies keep dialogue at a minimum so they can play better overseas, what a delight to listen to smart people whose conversation is like a kind of comic music." James Berardinelli of ReelViews wrote: "Anything Else may not be the second coming of Annie Hall, but it has more wit and substance than almost every post-college romance that sees the inside of a projection booth". David Stratton of Variety wrote: "The younger casting brings a freshness to the material and, with Allen as the weird mentor, there are plenty of laughs, even if the pacing's slow and the running time over-extended."

Mike Clark of USA Today was critical of the characterizations, the music, the length ("brutally overlong"), but praised the actors for their performances: "It's asking a lot of audiences to spend nearly two hours with characters as screen-unfriendly as the ones played by Biggs and Ricci, though both actors (and especially Ricci) do what they're asked to do." Clark also says the film "sounds as if it ought to be funny, but like so much else here, intent and execution keep missing each other," and complains that the misery of the story is not tempered by sufficient laughs.

In August 2009, it was cited by Quentin Tarantino as one of his favorite 20 films since 1992, when his career as a filmmaker began.

Leonard Maltin, in his TV, Movie, & Video Guide, gave the film a "BOMB" rating (the only Allen-directed film ever to receive this citation), and called it "a rare misfire for Woody, but still a big one". In 2016, film critics Robbie Collin and Tim Robey of The Daily Telegraph ranked Anything Else as one of the worst movies by Woody Allen.

== Soundtrack ==
- "Easy to Love" – Written by Cole Porter – Performed by Billie Holiday with Teddy Wilson & his Orchestra
- "Gat I" – Written and performed by Ravi Shankar
- "It Could Happen to You" – Written by Johnny Burke & Jimmy Van Heusen – Performed by Diana Krall
- "Gone with the Wind" – Written by Herb Magidson & Allie Wrubel – Performed by Wes Montgomery
- "The Way You Look Tonight" – Written by Dorothy Fields & Jerome Kern – Performed by Billie Holiday with Teddy Wilson & his Orchestra
- "I Can't Believe That You're in Love with Me" – Written by Clarence Gaskill & Jimmy McHugh – Performed by Billie Holiday with Teddy Wilson & his Orchestra
- "Honeysuckle Rose" – Written by Andy Razaf & Fats Waller – Performed by Teddy Wilson
- "I Can't Get Started" – Written by Vernon Duke & Ira Gershwin – Performed by Lester Young
- "Sunday (The Day Before My Birthday)" – Written by Moby & Sylvia Robinson – Performed by Moby
- "There'll Be Another Spring" – Written by Peggy Lee & Hubie Wheeler – Performed by Stockard Channing
- "There Will Never Be Another You" – Written by Harry Warren & Mack Gordon – Performed by Lester Young
