= Manish Jha (director) =

Indian film writer and director (born 1978)

- Born: 3 May 1978 (age 47); Bihar, India
- Occupations: Screenwriter, Film director, Film producer

Manish Jha is an Indian film writer and director, known for the film Matrubhoomi.

== Early life and education ==
Born in Dhamaura, in the West Champaran district of Bihar, Jha grew up in Delhi where he had moved at an early age. He did his graduation in English from Ramjas College, Delhi University, where he also joined its theatre group aiming to become an actor.

== Career ==
After completing his studies, Jha moved to Mumbai and began working as an assistant director in television serials hoping to get a break. When the break never came, he made a five-minute short film on the homeless putting in Rs 30,000, A Very Very Silent Film, which won the Jury Prize for the Best Short Film at the 2002 Cannes Film Festival. Thereafter he made his feature debut with Matrubhoomi (2003) about effects of female infanticide, which won a series of awards and critical acclaim. At the 2003 Venice Film Festival, it was presented in the Critic's Week (Parallel section) and later awarded the FIPRESCI Award "For its important theme on women's issues and female infanticide handled with sensitivity by a first-time director".

His next award was Anwar (2007), a film set in Lucknow, about stereotyping of Muslims in the post 9/11 era. In 2008, he directed the segment title, "And it Rained" in anthology film, with 11 directors, Mumbai Cutting, which became the closing film of 10th Osian's Cinefan Festival in Delhi.

He next directed a two-hour yoga DVD, Shilpa's Yoga (2008) for actress Shilpa Shetty, shot against the coastal backdrop of Kerala.

== Filmography ==
Director

- Matrubhoomi (2003)
- Anwar (2007)
- Mumbai Cutting (segment "And It Rained") (2010)
- The Legend of Michael Mishra (2016)

Screenwriter

- Matrubhoomi (2003)
- Anwar (2007)
- The Legend of Michael Mishra (2016)

Actor

- David (2013)

== Awards ==
A Very Very Silent Film

- Jury Prize for Matruboomi in the Best Short Film category at the 2002 Cannes Film Festival
- FIPRESCI Award in Parallel Section at the Venice Film Festival 2003
- Audience Award for Best Film at the Kozlin Film Festival 2003, Poland
- Audience Award for Best Foreign Film at Thessaloniki Film Festival, 2003
- Nominated for Golden Alexander (Best Film) at Thessaloniki Film Festival, 2003
- Audience Award for Best Film at River to River. Florence Indian Film Festival, 2003
