= Break Free (film) =

- Directed by: Gianluca Maria Tavarelli
- Written by: Gianluca Maria Tavarelli
- Starring: Elio Germano; Nicole Grimaudo
- Cinematography: Roberto Forza
- Edited by: Marco Spoletini
- Music by: Andrea Rocca
- Production companies: Fandango; Medusa Film
- Release date: 2003
- Running time: 105 min
- Country: Italy
- Language: Italian

Break Free (Italian: Liberi) is a 2003 Italian romantic comedy-drama film directed by Gianluca Maria Tavarelli.

For his performance in this film and in The Return of Cagliostro Luigi Maria Burruano received a special mention from the Pasinetti Award jury at the 2003 Venice Film Festival.

== Plot ==
The story tells of two boys from Abruzzo. Cenzo is iun man from Bussi sul Tirino, small mountain village, who moves to the big city of Pescara. But Cenzo doesn't get used to the city life, and falls into depression. The son Vince instead is a boy full of life, who dreams of escape from Pescara, and wants to learn about the world, and meets the traumatic Genny, a girl of Pescara too. Genny loves Vince, however she is a very sensitive girl who has panic attacks.

== Cast ==
- Elio Germano as Vince
- Nicole Grimaudo as Genny
- Anita Zagaria as Paola
- Luigi Maria Burruano as Cenzo
- Myriam Catania as Elena

== See also ==
- List of Italian films of 2003
