= Santa Maria Assunta, Calcinate =

Parish church in Calcinate, Italy

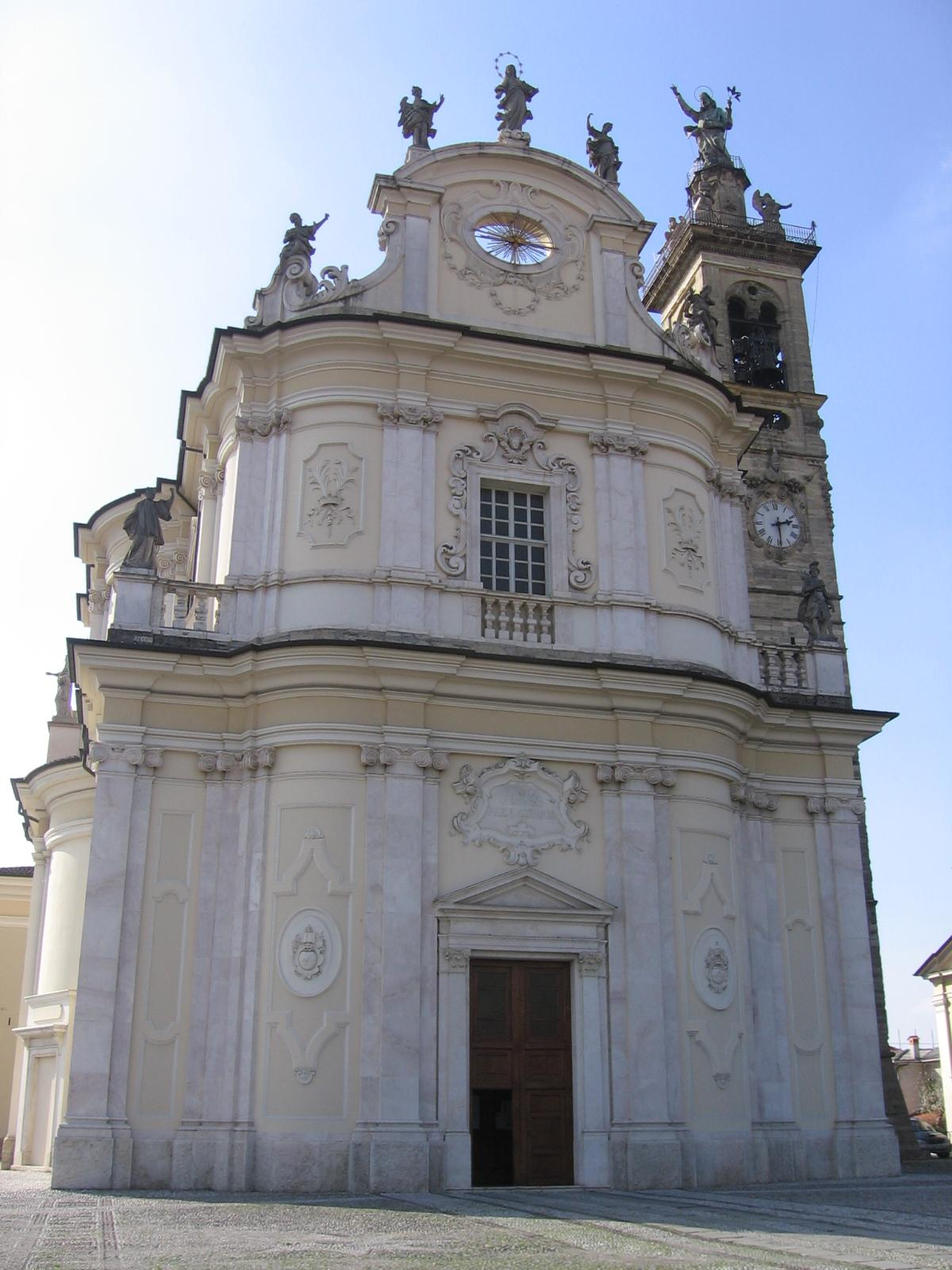

Location
- Interactive map of Santa Maria Assunta, Calcinate

Santa Maria Assunta, also dedicated to San Vittore, is a baroque-style, Roman Catholic parish church located in the town of Calcinate, province of Bergamo, region of Lombardy, Italy.

== History ==
The church was designed by Filippo Juvarra and with a convex marble facade by Anton Maria Pirovano. The skyline of the facade and bell-tower is populated by an ebullient crowd of statues.

Among the artworks in the church is a Madonna of the Assumption by Francesco Coghetti; and a dome fresco depicting Madonna giving the Scapular of Simon Stock to Pope Honorius III and a Crucifixion with Saints Valentine and Boniface both by Francesco Capella. The elaborate side altar (1762) was completed by Bartolomeo Manni the Younger, with stucco work by the brothers Muzio and Eugenio Camuzio.
