= Matrubhoomi =

Matrubhoomi: A Nation Without Women
- Theatrical release poster
- Directed by: Manish Jha
- Written by: Manish Jha
- Produced by: Patrick Sobelman; Punkej Kharbanda
- Starring: Tulip Joshi; Sudhir Pandey; Piyush Mishra; Sushant Singh; Aditya Srivastava
- Cinematography: Venu
- Edited by: Ashmith Kunder; Shirish Kunder
- Music by: Salim–Sulaiman
- Release date: 17 December 2003
- Running time: 93 minutes
- Country: India
- Language: Hindi

Matrubhoomi: A Nation Without Women (transl. Motherland: A Nation Without Women) is a 2003 Indian dystopian tragedy film written and directed by Manish Jha. The film examines the impact of female feticide and female infanticide on the gender balance and consequently the stability and attitudes of society. Its storyline bears some resemblance to real-life instances of gender imbalance and economics resulting in fraternal polyandry and bride buying in some parts of India. It depicts a future in an Indian village populated exclusively by males due to female infanticide over the years.

Matrubhoomi received widespread critical acclaim and was shown at festivals through 2003, including the 2003 Venice Film Festival, where it was presented in the Critic's Week (Parallel Sections) and later awarded the FIPRESCI Award "For it's [sic] important theme on women's issues and female infanticide handled with sensitivity by a first-time director".

== Plot ==
The story begins in a rural village in Bihar, with the birth of a baby girl to a village couple. Her disappointed father, who was hoping for a son, drowns her in a vat of milk in a public ceremony. Many years later somewhere around 2050 C.E., this unchecked criminal practice leads to the village being populated mostly by males and a tiny number of older women. The now uncouth and aggressive young men of the village are desperate for wives and release their frustration through group screenings of imported pornographic films, cross-dressed dance performances, and bestiality. They are shown to be willing to go to the lengths of human trafficking and courtship-driven emigration to procure wives for themselves.

Ramcharan, a wealthy man and the father of five young men, finds out about a single young girl named Kalki who lives some distance from the village, and buys her from her father. She is then married to all five sons simultaneously. Each night of the week, she is forced to sleep with one of the men, while Ramcharan rapes her on weekends. Of all the men in the boorish lot, only the youngest son Sooraj treats her with respect and tenderness.

Kalki develops a preference towards Sooraj, causing him to be killed by his jealous brothers. Kalki asks her father to help her escape but he is blinded by the money given to him as dowry, and turns her down. A sympathetic domestic servant boy from a lower caste helps her escape. However, he is brutally murdered by the brothers, while Kalki gets captured by them and chained to a post in a cow shed. She becomes a pawn in a game of revenge, in an inter-community conflict. The lower caste community of the village hold her responsible for the death of the servant boy and decides to avenge the murder through gang rape. Kalki is then sent back to her husbands.

Kalki becomes pregnant and everybody rejoices. A new servant boy is appointed for her care. As the news spreads, every man in the area claims paternity of the unborn child, which causes violence to break out in the village. The men kill each other off over the rights to Kalki and her child, thus leaving the village almost empty. In the meanwhile, Kalki goes into labour. The film ends on a violent but hopeful note, as she births a baby girl.

== Cast ==
- Tulip Joshi as Kalki
- Sudhir Pandey as Ramcharan
- Sushant Singh as Sooraj
- Vinamra Pancharia as Raghu
- Aditya Srivastava as Raghu's Uncle
- Piyush Mishra as Jagannath
- Mukesh S Bhatt as Raghu's elder brother
- Pankaj Jha as Rakesh
- Sanjay Kumar as Brijesh
- Rohitash Gaud as Pratab
- Rajesh Jais as Princess Pinkey
- Deepak Kumar Bandhu as Shailesh
- Amin Gazi as Sukha
- Chittaranjan Giri as Pappu

== Development and production ==
Director Manish Jha's debut short film, A Very Very Silent Film (2001), had previously won the Jury Prize for the Best Short Film at the Cannes Film Festival in 2002. He got the idea of Matrubhoomi upon reading, in a news magazine, about a village in Gujarat without women. Subsequently, while surfing the web, he read an article mentioning the fact that over the years, millions of girl children had fallen victims to gender discrimination in India. The film's French producer Patrick Sobelman asked Jha to produce a script outline on the subject, and he put out a two-page synopsis. Within a week he wrote a 200-page script, which he cut back to 70 pages. The project received a green light when its Indian producer Pankej Kharabanda came on board.

Having grown up in Bihar, he said he was aware of the practice of female infanticide and wanted to write a script about a future village if the practice continued. As women became extinct, the film allowed him to bring to light issues like polyandry, bride buying and rape.

Matrubhoomi's lead actress Tulip Joshi had refused the film after the first reading, but eventually decided to take it up. Later, she added, "But I'm glad I took it up finally, even though there was a point when I felt disgusted."

The film was shot on a tight budget of Rs. 2 crore, in Renai, a remote village in Harda district of Madhya Pradesh in 29 days. The cast included actors from Delhi theatre circuit, Sushant Singh, Aditya Shrivastav, Piyush Mishra and Deepak Bandhu.

== Themes ==
Director Manish Jha said, "I wanted to examine the emotional and psychological impact of a society without women,". "It is a very extreme situation ... a whole nation without women."

The central character Kalki being married to five brothers is analogous to Queen Draupadi being married to the Pandava brothers in Mahabharata. Kalki references Vishnu's prophesised tenth incarnation, Kalki, who would end the Kali Yuga.

== Release ==
After running through the festival circuit, including the 2003 Venice Film Festival, and 2003 Toronto International Film Festival, Matrubhoomi was commercially released two years later on 8 July 2005, with 150 prints. It was dubbed into six languages, including Tamil, Telugu, Bhojpuri, Gujarati, Bengali, and French, on a budget of Rs. 3 crore, to reach a wider audience.

== Awards ==
- FIPRESCI Award in Parallel Section at the Venice Film Festival 2003
- Audience Award for Best Film at the Kozlin Film Festival 2003, Poland
- Audience Award for Best Foreign Film at Thessaloniki Film Festival, 2003
- Nominated for Golden Alexander (Best Film) at Thessaloniki Film Festival, 2003
- Audience Award for Best Film at River to River. Florence Indian Film Festival, 2003
