= Shooting the Mafia =

Documentary film

- Film poster
- Directed by: Kim Longinotto
- Produced by: Niamh Fagan
- Starring: Letizia Battaglia
- Edited by: Ollie Huddleston
- Music by: Ray Harman
- Production company: Lunar Pictures
- Release date: 22 November 2019 (US)
- Running time: 94 minutes
- Countries: Ireland; United States
- Languages: English; Italian
- Box office: $31,160

Shooting the Mafia is a documentary film directed by Kim Longinotto about Italian photographer Letizia Battaglia and her career documenting the life and crimes of the Mafia in and around Palermo. Battaglia offers a glimpse into life under Mafia rule and those who live through it.

It won the Audience Award at the 2019 Brussels International Film Festival (BRIFF).
