= The Legend of Michael Mishra =

2016 Indian film by Manish Jha

- Theatrical release poster
- Directed by: Manish Jha
- Written by: Anshuman Chaturvedi (Dialogues)
- Screenplay by: Manish Jha
- Story by: Manish Jha; Radhakrishnan; Sneha Nihalani
- Produced by: Kishor Arora; Shareen Mantri Kedia
- Starring: Arshad Warsi; Aditi Rao Hydari; Kayoze Irani
- Cinematography: Manoj Soni
- Edited by: Nipun Ashok Gupta
- Music by: Songs: Meet Bros Anjjan; Som-Raul; Abhinav Bansal; Rishi-Siddharth; Ujjwal-Nikhil; Background score: Rishi-Siddharth
- Production companies: Eye Candy Films; Wave Cinemas
- Release date: 5 August 2016
- Country: India
- Language: Hindi

The Legend of Michael Mishra is a 2016 Indian Hindi-language comedy film written and directed by Manish Jha. It is produced by Kishor Arora and Shareen Mantri Kedia of Eyecandy Films. The film stars Arshad Warsi, Aditi Rao Hydari and Kayoze Irani with Boman Irani in a cameo appearance. It was released on 5 August 2016.

== Plot ==
The film begins with FP, owner of Michael Mishra's Restaurant, narrating the story of Michael Mishra to customers at the restaurant.

Michael Mishra is an illegal immigrant from Nepal living in Bihar, India. He falls in love with Varsha Shukla at first sight in his teenage. Before he talks to her, he is arrested by police. He leaves his necklace to her before being taken away by police. Police take Michael and other Nepali illegal immigrants to India-Nepal border to send them back to their own country. However, Michael runs back to India, to find Varsha, despite knowing nothing about her, even her name.

Michael cannot find Varsha. He then lives and grows up in Bihar, and becomes the head of a local kidnapping group. Even grown up, Michael never gives up looking for Varsha. However, the only way Michael can identify Varsha now is by recognizing her voice of saying Hello. Michael once saves the life of a young man nicknamed Half Pant, a.k.a. HP, and HP therefore joins Michael's kidnapping business to help Michael. The two gradually become close friends.

In a local music competition, Michael finally finds Varsha, who is a contestant at the event. With the help of HP, Michael interact with Varsha for several times. He even moves to Varsha's neighbourhood to get close to her. One day, Michael writes a love letter to Varsha, addressing himself as MM. He throw the letter to Varsha's balcony, and later gets a positive response by the same means. Varsha also says in the letter that she can only marry him after he reforms himself.

Michael loves Varsha so much that he decides to reform himself to marry her. He disbands his kidnapping group and releases all the hostages. To completely reform himself, Michael surrenders himself to police and confesses all his past crimes. Before surrendering himself, Michael wrote another letter to Varsha, saying he will not come back until completely reforming himself. The letter however failed to reach Varsha, and Michael is unaware of it.

Varsha, who does not know Michael is in prison to reform himself, is heartbroken to see Michael disappeared without informing her. She thinks Michael left her. Her family forces her to marry the boy of their choice. Upset Varsha escapes from family and moves to Mumbai to pursue her music dream. HP secretly follows and protects her. After two years, Varsha is very successful in music industry and becomes very popular now.

In an accident, Michael saves the life of the jail police chief, who is later very moved after learning Michael's story. The police lets Michael escape, and erases his records in police system. Michael returns to Bihar, only to find Varsha already left her old house is now nowhere known by him. He leads a new life by working as flower deliveryman at his former colleague's store. Michael still has not given up finding Varsha.

Michael learns Varsha's whereabout on newspaper, where her name is mentioned as a famous star in Mumbai. Michael travels to Mumbai to find her, and meets HP first, who told Michael everything that happened when he was in jail. Michael finally finds Varsha and speaks to her, but to his surprise, Varsha refuses to talk to him, saying she doesn't even know him. Michael gets very sad, and leaves the city.

HP confronts Varsha and blames her, saying she forgot her past, including her promise to Michael, after getting fames. It is found in their subsequent talk that Varsha actually did not know Michael. She thought the love letter, which Michael wrote and addressed himself as MM in, was from Mithilesh Mathur (Kunal Sharma) -- her former friend that she loved and who lived above Michael's house. HP then tells Varsha about the necklace, that Michael left with her at the first sight, and that Michael began to love her in his teenage. Varsha gets very moved and reunites with Michael.

At the end, FP reveals his name FP stands for Full Pant—yes, he is the old Half Pant.

== Cast ==
- Arshad Warsi as Bhaiyyaji / Michael Mishra
- Aditi Rao Hydari as Varsha Shukla
- Kayoze Irani as Half Pant (HP)
- Anshuman Chaturvedi as Mukund Kumar
- Kunal Sharma as Mithilesh Mathur
- Gulfam Khan as Chachi
- Yuri Suri as Jailor
- Mohit Balchandani as Michael Misra
- Sumeet Samnani as Tiwari's son
- Saloni Batra as Audition girl
- Sharat Sonu as Pantar_Pintu
- Abhay Bhargav as Chacha
- Gyanendra Tripathi as Cafe manager
- Ashish Warang as Tiwari
- Shashi Ranjan
- Boman Irani as Full Pant (FP) / Older Half Pant (cameo appearance)

== Filming ==
The shooting of the film began on 5 January 2014 in Mumbai.

== Release ==
The film was released on 5 August 2016. The film was banned in the state of Punjab and Haryana following protests over a dialogue in the film referring to Maharishi Valmiki.

== Music ==
The music for the film is composed by Meet Bros Anjjan, Som-Raul, Abhinav Bansal, Rishi-Siddharth and Ujjwal-Nikhil while the lyrics have been penned by Kumaar, Alaukik Rahi, Abhinav Bansal, Amitabh Ranjan, Manish Jha and Ujjwal-Nikhil. The music rights are acquired by T-Series. The first song titled "Luv Letter" was released on 18 July 2016 while the full album was released on 21 July 2016.

No.	Title	Lyrics	Music	Singer(s)	Length
1.	"Luv Letter"	Kumaar	Meet Bros Anjjan	Meet Bros, Kanika Kapoor	3:40
2.	"Ishq Di Gaadi"	Nikhil, Ujjwal, Akash	Ujjwal-Nikhil	Kartik Dhiman	3:49
3.	"Phir Tu"	Abhinav Bansal	Abhinav Bansal	Sakina Khan	3:57
4.	"Nikhatoo"	Amitabh Ranjan	Som-Raul	Som Riggs	3:37
5.	"Filam Shuru Hui Hai"	Alaukik Rahi	Rishi-Siddharth	Rishi-Siddharth	2:57
6.	"Nikhatoo (Remix)"	Amitabh Ranjan	Som-Raul	Som Riggs	2:35
Total length:					20:35

== Reception ==
=== Critical reception ===
The Times of India gave a rating of 2 out of 5 stars to the movie. The Indian Express gave a rating of 1 out of 5 stars. The Hindu does not give any official rating, but severely criticizes, virtually all aspects of the film. It talks about the director lacking control over the film completely, and accuses him of not even having supervised the script. Both the lead hero and heroine are also criticized. At one place, the reviewer implies, that the film is full of irritation and boredom.
