= Davide Cesare =

Italian activist (1976–2003)

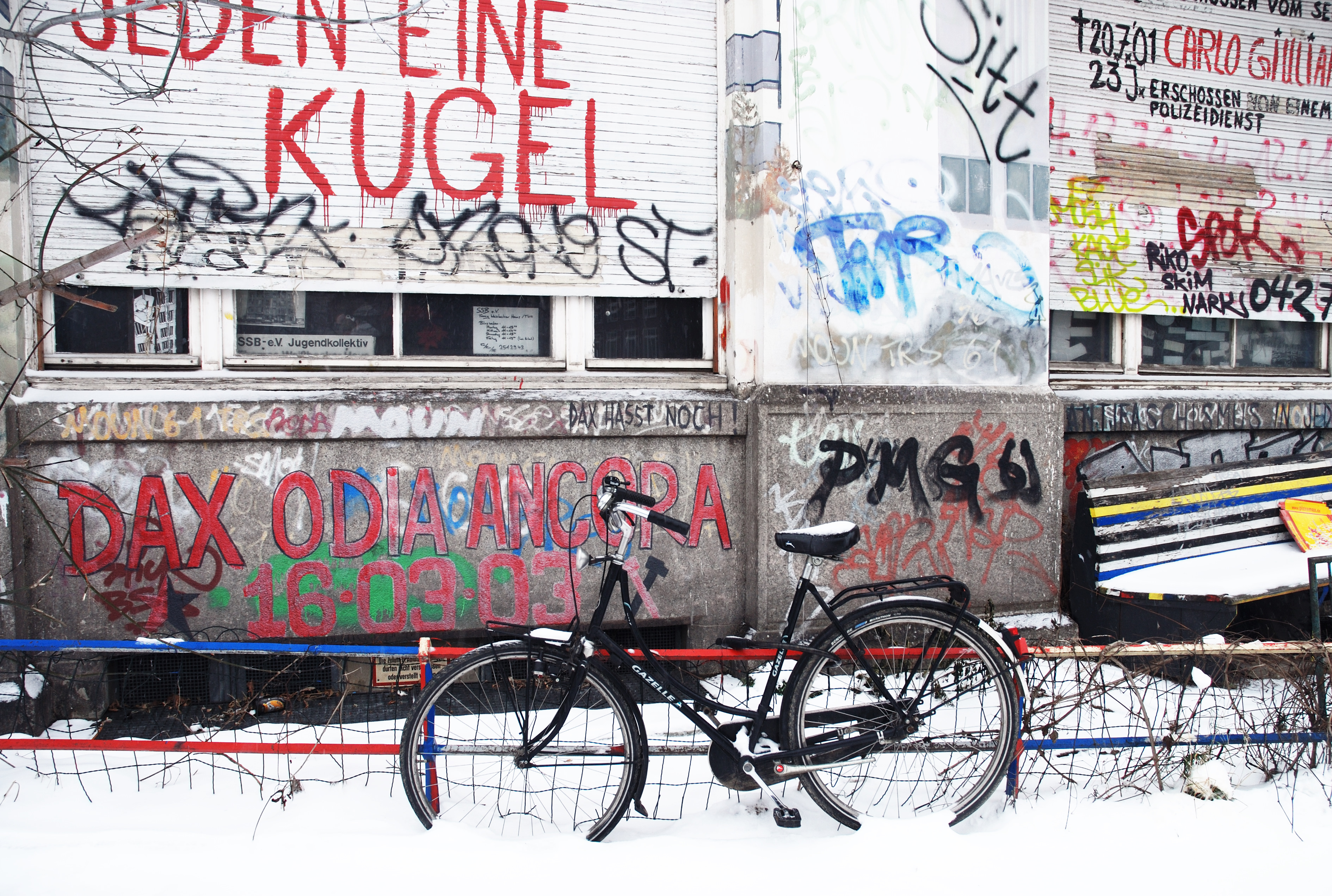
Graffiti reading "Dax odia ancora" (Dax still hates) in the Kreuzberg district, Berlin (2010)

Davide Cesare, also known as Dax (7 November 1976 – 16 March 2003) was an Italian anti-fascist activist from Rozzano, who was stabbed to death by two far-right activists in Milan, the night of 16 March 2003. Cesare was brought to the hospital but died in the ambulance. Immediately after his death, members of his group tried to enter the hospital but were blocked by the police. This resulted in new riots with several people being injured, damage to police cars, and the emergency department suspending all activities for the whole night.

Cesare's death and the following trial had a wide political resonance in far-left circles, both in Italy and abroad. This was partly because the Italian media initially portrayed the events as a "riot between young dissidents" and, according to some sources, deliberately misrepresented Cesare's death as "a consequence of anti-globalization violence". During the trial, it turned out that brothers Federico Morbi and Mattia Morbi, the aggressors of Cesare, had in fact assaulted and killed him with premeditation. They were declared guilty in May 2004; Federico was sentenced to 16 years in jail, while Mattia (who was a minor at the time of the facts) was sentenced to 3 years. Giorgio Morbi, father of Federico and Mattia, was also judged guilty of attempted murder for beating a companion of Cesare on the same night. One of the lawyers that represented the family of Cesare in the trial was Giuliano Pisapia, who would later become Mayor of Milan (assumed office on 1 June 2011).

A plaque has been placed in Via Brioschi (the street of Milan where he was killed). Graffiti in memory of Dax are quite common in Milan, but have also appeared elsewhere and abroad; they usually read "Dax vive" ("Dax lives", in Italian) or "Dax odia ancora" ("Dax still hates"). One of these graffiti, portraying Cesare's face, used to be painted on the Darsena in Milan, former port of the Navigli canal system; its removal by Milan's cleansing department in 2007 was subject to much controversy and was strongly condemned both by activist associations and by members of the government.
