= Belluscone: A Sicilian Story =

- Directed by: Franco Maresco
- Written by: Franco Maresco; Claudia Uzzo
- Cinematography: Luca Bigazzi; Tommaso Lusena; Irma Vecchio
- Release date: August 31, 2014 (Venice)
- Running time: 95 minutes

Belluscone: A Sicilian Story (Italian: Belluscone - una storia siciliana) is a 2014 Italian docu-fiction film written and directed by Franco Maresco. It was screened in the Horizons section at the 71st Venice International Film Festival, winning the Special Jury Prize.

== Cast ==
- Salvatore De Castro
- Ciccio Mira
- Vittorio Ricciardi
- Marcello Dell'Utri
- Ficarra e Picone
- Tatti Sanguineti
- Vittorio Sgarbi
