= 2003 Italian regional elections =

Regional elections were held in some regions of Italy during 2003. These included:

- Friuli-Venezia Giulia on 8 June
- Aosta Valley on 8 June
- Trentino-Alto Adige on 26 October
