= 2003 Italian referendum =

15 May 2003

Forcing small companies to re-employ illegitimately fired workers
Yes	86.7%
No	13.3%
Proposal failed as voter turnout was below 50%

Refusal to allow electricity cables to be installed on private property
Yes	85.6%
No	14.4%
Proposal failed as voter turnout was below 50%

A double abrogative referendum was held in Italy on 15 May 2003. Voters were asked whether small companies should be forced to re-employ workers they had sacked illegitimately and whether the property owners could refuse to allow electricity cables to be installed on private property. Although both were approved by wide margins, the voter turnout of 26% was well below the 50% threshold and the results were invalidated.

== Results ==
=== Forcing small companies to re-employ illegitimately fired workers ===
Choice	Votes	%
Yes	10,572,538	86.7
No	1,616,379	13.3
Invalid/blank votes	446,042	–
Total	12,645,507	100
Registered voters/turnout	49,554,128	25.5
Source: Nohlen & Stöver

=== Refusal to allow electricity cables to be installed on private property ===
Choice	Votes	%
Yes	10,430,181	85.6
No	1,761,558	14.4
Invalid/blank votes	463,207	–
Total	12,667,178	100
Registered voters/turnout	49,554,128	25.6
Source: Nohlen & Stöver
