= Amal Bedjaoui =

Algerian director, producer and screenwriter

- Born: July 27, 1963 (age 63); Algiers
- Education: Institut des hautes études cinématographiques New York University; University of Paris 1 Pantheon-Sorbonne
- Occupations: Screenwriter, film producer, film director
- Notable work: Un fils (2003)
- Father: Mohammed Bedjaoui

Amal Bedjaoui (born 27 July 1963) is an Algerian film director, producer, and screenwriter.

== Life and career ==
Born in Algiers, she studied filmmaking at New York University. She graduated from Institut des hautes études cinématographiques and then obtained a Master of Advanced Studies in Cinema at the University of Paris 1 Pantheon-Sorbonne in 1987. For several years she worked as an assistant director and production manager on feature films and as an assistant director for theatrical productions. Her first short film, Une vue imprenable, came out in 1993. Her second short film, Shoot me an Angel, was released in 1995 and won the Panorama Prize at the Berlin International Film Festival.

In 2002, she created the production company ML Productions. The following year, she directed and produced the 58-minute film Un Fils. Un fils tells the story of Selim, a young male prostitute and his relationship with an older madam. A large portion of the film switches between ordinary daytime scenes, such as Selim meeting his father, and nighttime scenes in which sexuality is explored. It has been cited as a "model of dissident sexual citizenship."

Bedjaoui is the daughter of diplomat and politician Mohammed Bedjaoui.
