= Fiore (film) =

2016 film

- Film poster
- Directed by: Claudio Giovannesi
- Written by: Claudio Giovannesi
- Starring: Daphne Scoccia
- Release dates: 17 May 2016 (Cannes); 25 May 2017 (Italy)
- Running time: 110 minutes
- Country: Italy
- Language: Italian

Fiore is a 2016 Italian drama film directed by Claudio Giovannesi. It was screened in the Directors' Fortnight section at the 2016 Cannes Film Festival.

== Cast ==
- Daphne Scoccia
- Josciua Algeri
- Valerio Mastandrea
- Laura Vasiliu
- Aniello Arena
