= The Return of Cagliostro =

- Directed by: Ciprì & Maresco
- Written by: Ciprì & Maresco
- Starring: Luigi Maria Burruano; Franco Scaldati; Robert Englund
- Cinematography: Daniele Ciprì
- Edited by: Fabio Nunziata
- Music by: Salvatore Bonafede
- Release date: 2003
- Running time: 100 minutes

The Return of Cagliostro (Italian: Il ritorno di Cagliostro) is a 2003 Italian mockumentary-comedy film directed by Daniele Ciprì and Franco Maresco.

For his performance in this film and in Break Free Luigi Maria Burruano received a special mention from the Pasinetti Award jury at the 2003 Venice Film Festival.

== Plot ==
In the immediate post-war Sicily the La Marca brothers, owners of a sacred craft company, set up, with the consent of the Archbishop of Palermo Cardinal Sucato, the Trinacria House of Film Production, which they intend it should be the "beginning of a Sicilian Hollywood". The first films, played by non-professional actors, badly rehearsed and directed, are commercial disasters, and so to revive the fortunes of the company they have the idea to make a film about the life of Cagliostro, engaging Errol Douglas, an alcoholic Hollywood star whose career is going into sharp decline, in the title role.

== Cast ==
- Luigi Maria Burruano as Carmelo La Marca
- Franco Scaldati as Salvatore La Marca
- Robert Englund as Erroll Douglas
- Pietro Giordano as Cardinal Sucato / Pino Grisanti
- Margareth Woodhouse as Elizabeth Burnett
