= 2003 Italy rugby union tour of New Zealand =

Summary
P	W	D	L
Total
5	2	0	3
Test match
0	0	0	0

The 2003 Italy rugby union tour of New Zealand was a series of matches played in June 2003 in New Zealand by the Italian team to prepare the 2003 Rugby World Cup. No Test match was played

'Scores and results list Italy's points tally first.

Opposing Team	For	Against	Date	Venue	Status
Southland	18	40	15 June 2003	Invercargill	Tour match
Counties Manukau	26	18	18 June 2003	Pukekohe	Tour match
Bay of Plenty	30	33	22 June 2003	Rotorua	Tour match
Taranaki	18	13	25 June 2003	New Plymouth	Tour match
Waikato	3	23	28 June 2003	Hamilton	Tour match
