= Citizens of the World =

- Directed by: Gianni Di Gregorio
- Written by: Gianni Di Gregorio; Marco Pettenello
- Produced by: Angelo Barbagallo
- Starring: Ennio Fantastichini; Giorgio Colangeli; Gianni Di Gregorio
- Cinematography: Gian Enrico Bianchi
- Edited by: Marco Spoletini
- Release date: 2019
- Country: Italy
- Language: Italian

Citizens of the World (Italian: Lontano lontano) is a 2019 Italian comedy film written and directed by Gianni Di Gregorio. It premiered at the 2019 Torino Film Festival.

== Cast ==
- Ennio Fantastichini as Attilio
- Giorgio Colangeli as Giorgetto
- Gianni Di Gregorio as The Professor
- Roberto Herlitzka as Federmann
- Daphne Scoccia as Fiorella
- Salih Saadin Khalid as Abu
- Francesca Ventura as Carolina
- Iris Peynado as Marisa
- Galatea Ranzi as Lady at the Bar

== Reception ==
The Guardian film critic Peter Bradshaw described the film as "gentle, wistful late-life comedy, [...] a sort of Italian version of Last of the Summer Wine." According to Little White Lies reviewer David Jenkins, the film is "delightful" and "does float by gracefully on a wave of easy, lightly ironic charm, and di Gregorio himself is just an extremely warm and funny screen presence".
