= Murder of Davide Cesare =

2003 murder in Milan, Italy

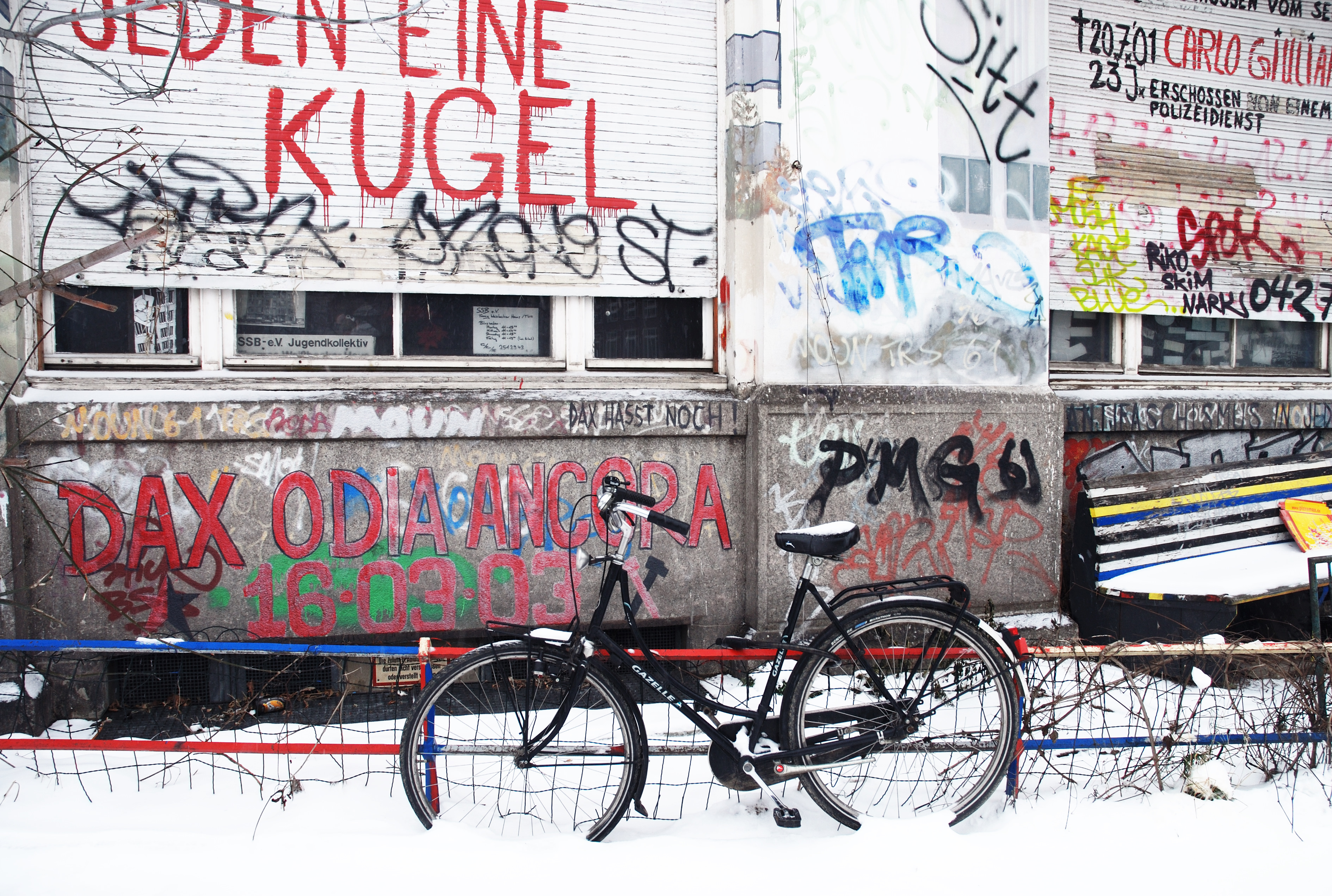
- Location: Milan, Italy
- Date: 16 March 2003; 05:45 (approximately) (CET)
- Attack type: stabbing
- Deaths: 1
- Victim: Davide (Dax) Cesare
- Perpetrators: Federico Morbi, Mattia Morbi, George Morbi
- Motive: Vendetta

The murder of Davide Cesare occurred on the morning of 16 March 2003 in Milan, Italy.

Cesare was an anti-fascist activist. Although the perpetrators of the crime denied belonging to any political group, their strong sympathy for far-right circles gave the event and the trial that followed a wide resonance, both in Italy and abroad.

== Events ==
=== Background ===
Davide Cesare, known as Dax, was 26 years old, lived in Rozzano, in the province of Milan. Cesare was born in Brescia on 7 November 1976. In 2003, he had a six-year-old daughter, worked as a labourer and truck driver. He was also an activist at the social centre in Via Gola. The week before his murder, on 10 March 2003, Federico Morbi was attacked while walking his dog, named "Rommel" in honour of the Afrikakorps general. The dog's name, an indication of neo-Nazi sympathies, triggered an attack against Morbi which was reported to the police the following day. Morbi suffered injuries which were judged to heal in five days. The perpetrators of the attack, around ten people, were indicated by the attacker himself as belonging to the antagonistic far-left area and gravitating in the same area.

=== Assault ===
On the night of 16 March 2003, Davide Cesare was in a bar in Milan, in the Ticinese area, in via Brioschi, together with three other friends, members of the ORSo social centre. Having gone out to smoke a cigarette together, the four were victims of a premeditated ambush by Federico, Mattia and Giorgio Morbi. They were convinced they had tracked down the perpetrators of the attack they had suffered the previous week. The four members of the social centres were attacked and did not have time to defend themselves. Two of them were stabbed. One was wounded by about ten stab wounds in the vital area but was saved by an operation that lasted the whole night, while for Davide Cesare the wounds were fatal.

=== Subsequent riots ===
As soon as the news of the death spread, some militants of the antagonistic left gathered outside the San Paolo Hospital, where the victims of the attack were hospitalized, to check on their conditions. They did not know at the time that Davide Cesare had been pronounced dead. The police and Carabinieri lined up outside the building to prevent them from accessing the emergency department. Reached by reinforcements, the police decided to block access to the victim's friends and companions who had come to get news of their friend. Verbal clashes and beatings followed on the street and in the corridors of the hospital, which were then reported to the police.

Due to these events, the emergency room staff had to stop working until seven o'clock the following morning and many patients were moved to other facilities to receive adequate care.

== Trial ==
In May 2004, the sentences were handed down. Federico Morbi, the elder of the two brothers, was sentenced to sixteen years and eight months in prison. The father, initially acquitted because he was not held responsible for the attack, was sentenced to three years and four months in prison for the attempted murder of one of the other boys attacked that night. The Juvenile court granted the younger son, Mattia Morbi (who was 17 on the night of the murder), probation in a community for a period of three years. The sentences imposed did not differ greatly from those requested by the Public Prosecutor Nicola Di Plotti, who had deemed eighteen years of detention applicable to the first and five years to the second. To the prison sentences must be added 150,000 euros in indemnity to the mother, 100,000 to the partner and 100,000 to the victim's daughter. One of the lawyers who represented the Cesare family in the trial was Giuliano Pisapia, who would later become mayor of Milan on 1 June 2011.

As regards the events that occurred at the San Paolo hospital, the first-instance sentence was reached in 2006 with three convictions and four acquittals. Two of Davide Cesare's companions were sentenced to one year and eight months, while a Carabinieri marshal was sentenced to seven months . The judges also imposed on the militants the payment of a provisional compensation of 100 thousand Euros. However, two other militants from Milanese social centres were acquitted, as were two other members of the police force, for whom the Public Prosecutor's Office had requested a conviction. During the appeal trial, the Carabinieri marshal was acquitted, while the other decisions of the court were confirmed; the appeal sentence was confirmed by the Court of Cassation in 2009.

The ORSo social centre was meanwhile evicted on 11 October 2006.

== Political consequences ==
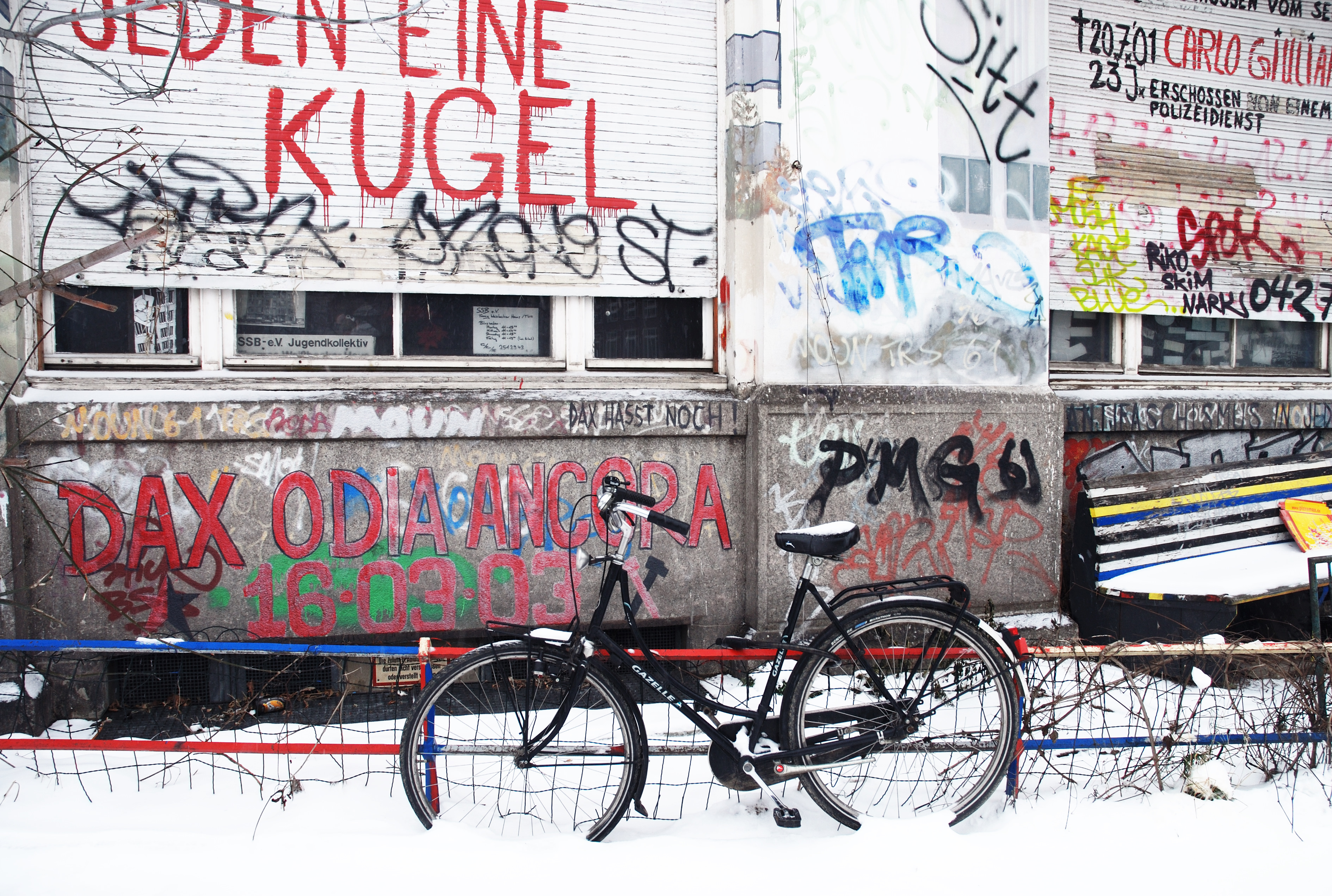
Graffiti in memory of Davide Cesare "Dax hates again" in the Kreuzberg district of Berlin (2010)

On the occasion of Davide Cesare's funeral, held in Rozzano on 22 March 2003, a large demonstration took place during which the Banda Bassotti played to pay homage to the deceased: approximately 1,200 people from all over Lombardy were present at the ceremony.

The killing heightened tensions between the far right and the far left in an increasing violence that recalled the Years of Lead (1968–1988). Davide Cesare became a symbol of the anti-fascist and anti-capitalist struggle for left-wing movements and communist parties that organized political events and demonstrations in his name. A commemorative plaque was placed in via Brioschi (the street where Davide Cesare was killed). Graffiti in memory of Davide Cesare are quite common in Milan, often accompanied by writings such as "Dax vive" and "Dax odia ancora". In 2007, the cancellation by the Municipality of one of these graffiti, placed at the Darsena, raised some controversy and was condemned by activist associations and some members of the municipal council. The then Councillor for Culture of the Municipality of Milan, Vittorio Sgarbi, opposed this decision, attributing to the graffito a good artistic quality, which had to be preserved out of a sense of "pietas" towards Davide Cesare.

A procession was also organized on the tenth anniversary of the death of Davide Cesare, who became a symbol of the anti-fascist struggle; approximately 4,000 demonstrators took part. Incidents during the demonstration caused considerable disruption in the streets of central Milan: approximately 400,000 euros of damage were calculated due to the destruction of shop windows and damage to cars.

=== Other tributes ===
'O Zulù reinterpreted the song Stalingrado Milano Baghdad, dedicated to Dax by Microplatform, which contains the slogan "March sixteenth, red flags in the wind: they kill a comrade, a hundred more are born".

In Milan, two plaques were put up in memory of the victim. One of them reads:

"Resignation is fear and complicity!

Against resignation think the unthinkable!
Against fear learn courage!
Conspiring means breathing together
Long live Dax free and rebellious Davide
(03.16.03)

Killed because he was an anti-fascist militant"

The other reads: "Dax lives here, 16-3-2003, Antifascist".

In Cosenza, the Lumpen, a punk rock band, in 2011 dedicated a song to Dax entitled: "Dax odia ancora", included in the album "In ogni caso nessuna remorse".

The cartoonist Zerocalcare recalled the case in the comic "La scuola di pizze in faccia del professor Calcare" in a chapter that explains the impossibility of dialogue with movements that are based on fascism.

Rapper Aban dedicated the song "Dax" to him, included in the 2021 album "Rap Inferno".

On 16 March 2023, the 20th annversaery of his death was marked by a procession in Milan.

== Films ==
- Andrea Pastor, With Dax in the heart

== Bibliography ==
- AA.VV (2004). Le mille e una... Milano. Voci dal Mediterraneo sulla città. Milano: Rubbettino editore. ISBN 88-498-0936-0.
- AA.VV (2009). Ti racconto dax. Purple Press. ISBN 978-88-95903-24-8.
- AA.VV (2012). Riot, storie di ordinaria resistenza. BePress. ISBN 978-88-96130-30-8.
- Antonino Alesi (2011). Interminabili disordini. BePress. ISBN 978-88-96130-22-3.
- Antonino Alesi (2012). Cockney è bello. Racconti di vita skinhead, di movimento, immigrazione e di piccoli bastardi degli anni '80. BePress. ISBN 978-88-96130-26-1.
- Cristiano Armati (2010). Cuori rossi. Newton Compton. ISBN 978-88-541-1886-7.
- Adriano Chiarelli (2011). Malapolizia. Newton Compton. ISBN 978-88-541-3523-9.
- Giorgio Galli (2004). Piombo Rosso. Baldini e Castoldi. ISBN 88-8490-507-9.
- Beppe Grillo (2011). Santi laici: Storie di uomini e donne che hanno dato la vita per salvare la nostra democrazia. Rizzoli. ISBN 978-88-586-2001-4.
- Matteo Guarnaccia (2010). Quelli che Milano: Storie, leggende, misteri e varietà. Rizzoli. ISBN 978-88-17-04545-2.
- Paola Savoldi (2007). Milano in Contrasto. Maggioli. ISBN 978-88-387-4111-1.
