= Europa (newspaper) =

- A Europa front page from Friday 31 January 2014
- Type: Daily newspaper
- Format: Compact
- Founded: 12 February 2003
- Ceased publication: 31 October 2014
- Language: Italian
- Headquarters: Rome, Italy
- Circulation: 3,000 (2012)
- Website: europaquotidiano.it

Europa was an Italian daily newspaper.

== History and profile ==
Europa was first published on 12 February 2003. The paper was started as the official press organ of the political party Democracy is Freedom – The Daisy. After the merger of the party to form the Democratic Party, the newspaper remained in the availability of the party.

The 2012 circulation of the paper was 3,000 copies.

Europa ceased publication on 31 October 2014.
