= Claudio Giovannesi =

Italian film director and screenwriter (born 1978)

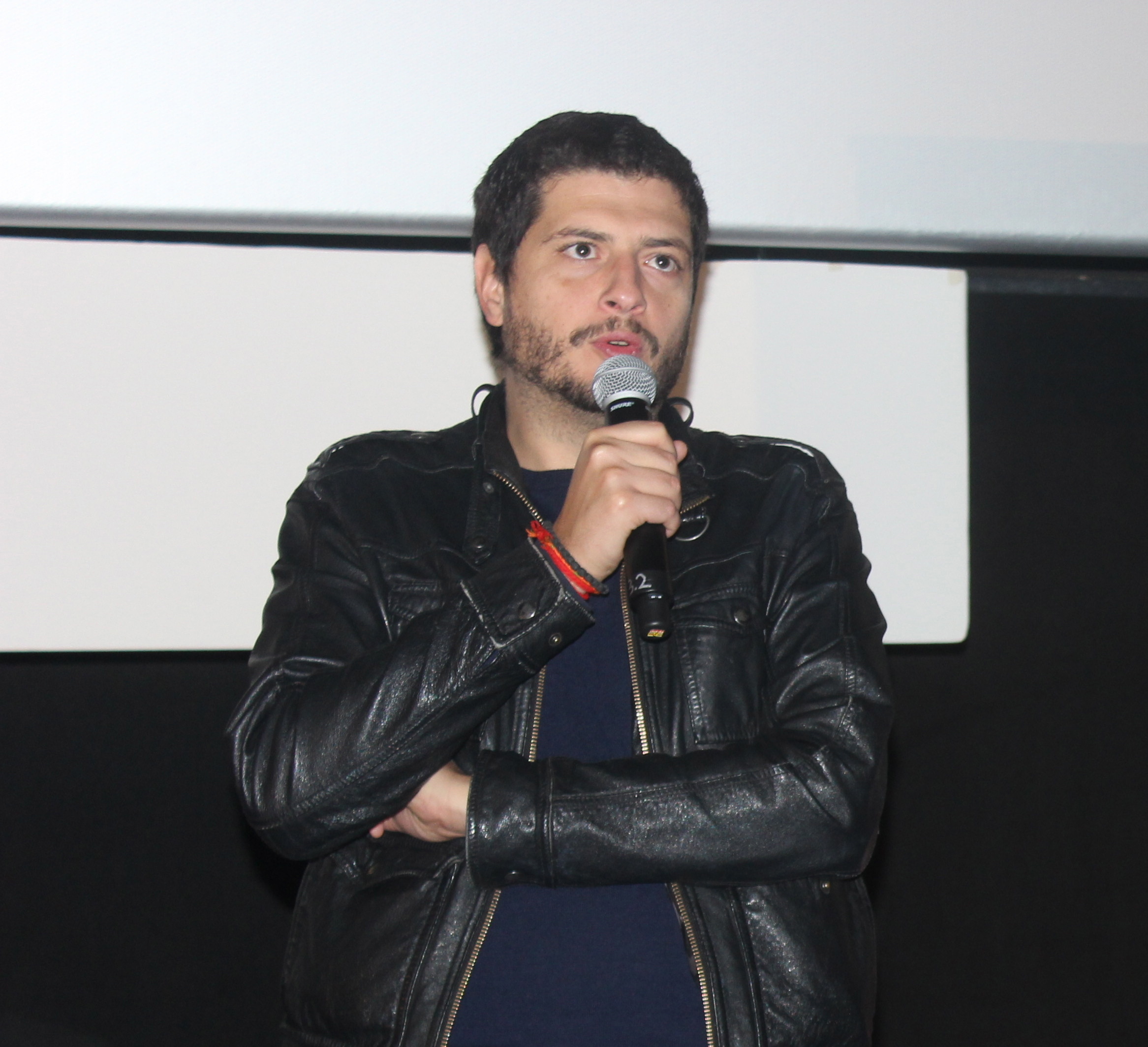
- Born: 20 March 1978 (age 47); Rome, Italy
- Occupation(s): Director, Screenwriter
- Years active: 2001–present

Claudio Giovannesi (born 20 March 1978) is an Italian film director and screenwriter.

== Biography ==
After graduating in Modern Letters at the Sapienza University of Rome and in Film Directing at the Experimental Film Centre, Giovannesi directed his first film La casa sulle nuvole in 2008 and presented the movie at the Brussels Film Festival.

In 2012, Giovannesi directed his second feature film Alì ha gli occhi azzurri that won the Special Jury Prize and the Best First and Second Feature Award at the Rome Film Festival, while his third film Fiore was presented at the 2016 Cannes Film Festival's Directors' Fortnight.

In 2019, Giovannesi fourth feature film Piranhas, based on the novel by Roberto Saviano, took part to the 69th Berlin International Film Festival main competition, receiving critical acclaim and winning the Silver Bear for Best Screenplay.

== Filmography ==
=== Film ===
- La casa sulle nuvole (The House on the Clouds, 2008)
- Alì ha gli occhi azzurri (Alì Blue Eyes, 2012)
- Fiore (2016)
- Piranhas (2019)
- Hey Joe (2024)

=== TV ===
- Gomorrah (2016, 2 episodes)

== Awards and nominations ==
- Rome Film Festival
  - 2012: Special Jury Prize — Alì ha gli occhi azzurri
  - 2012: Best First and Second Feature Award — Alì ha gli occhi azzurri
  - 2012: Nominated for Golden Marco Aurelio for Best Picture — Alì ha gli occhi azzurri
- Cannes Film Festival
  - 2016: Nominated for Queer Palm — Fiore
- Berlin International Film Festival
  - 2019: Silver Bear for Best Screenplay — Piranhas
  - 2019: Nominated for Golden Bear — Piranhas
- David di Donatello Awards
  - 2017: Nominated for Best Film — Fiore
  - 2017: Nominated for Best Director — Fiore
  - 2017: Nominated for Best Screenplay — Fiore
- Nastro d'Argento Awards
  - 2013: Nominated for Best Director — Alì ha gli occhi azzurri
  - 2017: Nominated for Best Picture — Fiore
  - 2017: Nominated for Best Screenplay — Fiore
