= Global Citizen =

Global Citizen may refer to:

- Global citizenship, the concept that one's identity transcends geography or political borders
- Global Citizen (organization), an international advocacy organization fighting to end extreme poverty
- Global Citizen Festival, an annual music festival started in 2012 and organized by Global Citizen
