= Miss Universo Italia 2003 =

- Presenters: Enrico Papi
- Broadcaster: Canale 5
- Winner: Silvia Ceccon

The Miss Universo Italia 2003 pageant was held on January 31, 2003. The chosen winner represented Italy at the Miss Universe 2003.

== Results ==
- Miss Universo Italia 2003 : Silvia Ceccon
- 1st Runner Up : Anna Gigli Molinari
