= The Mafia Is No Longer What It Used to Be =

2019 film

- Theatrical release poster
- Directed by: Franco Maresco
- Screenplay by: Franco Maresco; Claudia Uzzo; Francesco Guttuso; Giuliano La Franca; Uliano Greca
- Produced by: Rean Mazzone; Anna Vinci; Marco Milone
- Cinematography: Tommaso Lusena de Sarmiento
- Edited by: Edoardo Morabito; Francesco Guttuso
- Music by: Salvatore Bonafede
- Production companies: Ila Palma; Amateru in collaboration with Dream Film; Tramp Limited
- Distributed by: Istituto Luce Cinecittà
- Release date: 6 September 2019 (Venice)
- Running time: 105 minutes
- Country: Italy
- Languages: Italian; Sicilian

The Mafia Is No Longer What It Used to Be (Italian: La mafia non è più quella di una volta) is a 2019 Italian satirical documentary film directed by Franco Maresco. It is intended as a follow-up to Belluscone: A Sicilian Story (2014). It was selected to compete for the Golden Lion at the 76th Venice International Film Festival. At the Venice Film Festival, the film won the Special Jury Prize.

== Synopsis ==
In 2017, on the twenty-fifth anniversary of Capaci and via D'Amelio bombings, where the Sicilian Mafia murdered antimafia judges Giovanni Falcone and Paolo Borsellino, director Franco Maresco wonders what's left of their ideals and struggles in contemporary Sicily, dwelling on its relationship with the Mafia through one of his usually darkly comic "anthropological" documentaries.

While discussing with renowned photographer Letizia Battaglia about the shallow institutionalization of antimafia by Italian politics, Maresco meets again Ciccio Mira, the shady Mafia-apologist concert organizer that four years earlier had been the subject of his documentary Belluscone: surprisingly, Mira seems a changed man, seeking some kind of redemption by organizing a Neomelodic concert in Palermo in tribute of Falcone and Borsellino. However, his words still betray some nostalgia for the "good old Mafia that used to be".

== Cast ==
- Letizia Battaglia
- Ciccio Mira
- Matteo Mannino, Mira's right-hand man
- Cristian Miscel, a Neomelodic singer
- Franco Zecchin, a photographer about the Mafia
- Pino Maniaci

== Production ==
The film was produced by Rean Mazzone, Anna Vinci and Marco Milone, with production companies Ila Palma and Amateru, in collaboration with Dream Film and Tramp Limited. Associated production companies also include Daring House, Il Saggiatore, Moretti & Petrassi Holding.
