= Daniele Ciprì =

Italian film director (born 1962)

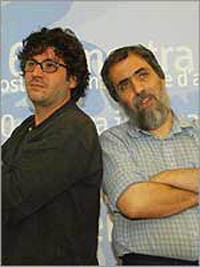
- Born: 17 August 1962 (age 64); Palermo, Italy
- Occupations: Film director; cinematographer
- Years active: 1991–present

Daniele Ciprì (born 17 August 1962) is an Italian film director and cinematographer. He is best known for his collaborations with Franco Maresco and for his film It Was the Son, for which he won the Golden Osella.

== Selected filmography ==
=== As director ===
- The Return of Cagliostro (2003; with Franco Maresco)
- It Was the Son (2012; also writer and cinematographer)

=== As cinematographer ===
- To Die for Tano, directed by Roberta Torre (1997)
- Angela, directed by Roberta Torre (2002)
- The Return of Cagliostro, directed by Ciprì & Maresco (2003)
- Vincere, directed by Marco Bellocchio (2009)
- La pecora nera, directed by Ascanio Celestini (2010)
- È stato il figlio, directed by Daniele Ciprì (2012)
- Dormant Beauty, directed by Marco Bellocchio (2012)
- Salvo, directed by Fabio Grassadonia and Antonio Piazza (2013)
- The State-Mafia Pact, directed by Sabina Guzzanti (2014)
- Blood of My Blood, directed by Marco Bellocchio (2015)
- Fiore, directed by Claudio Giovannesi (2016)
- Sweet Dreams, directed by Marco Bellocchio (2016)
- Non c'è più religione, directed by Luca Miniero (2016)
- Il primo re, directed by Matteo Rovere (2019)
- Piranhas, directed by Claudio Giovannesi (2019)
- An Almost Ordinary Summer, directed by Simone Godano (2019)
- Once Upon a Time... in Bethlehem, directed by Ficarra e Picone (2019)
- The Bad Poet, directed by Gianluca Jodice (2020)
- The Bone Breakers, directed by Vincenzo Pirrotta (2022)
- Hey Joe, directed by Claudio Giovannesi (2024)

== See also ==
- Ciprì & Maresco
