= Rome Independent Film Festival =

Annual film festivals held every year in November in Rome

- Location: Rome, Italy
- Established: 2001
- Website: https://www.riff.it/en/

Rome Independent Film Festival (or RIFF) is an annual film festival held every November in Rome, Italy to represent and promote independent filmmakers globally. The festival was started in 2001.

== The festival ==
Rome Independent Film Festival was first started in 2001 in Rome. In 2006's event Self Medicated by Monty Lapica was the winning film, in 2007 Punk Love by Nick Lyon, in 2008 The Class by Ilmar Raag, in 2009 Hunger by Steve McQueen, and in 2010's event Fish Tank by Andrea Arnold were among the major independent winners of the festival.

At the 17th event in 2018, the festival's main focus was on screening films from Albania and Spain and also based on LGBT issues.
