= Franco Maresco =

Italian film director, screenwriter, producer and film editor

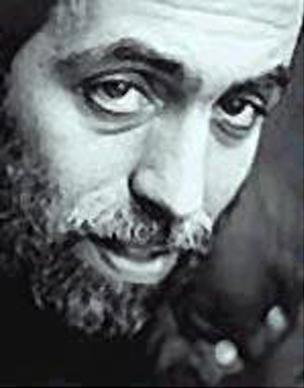
- Born: 5 May 1958 (age 68); Palermo, Italy
- Occupations: Film director; screenwriter; film editor
- Years active: 1992–present

Franco Maresco is an Italian filmmaker. He is best known for his collaborations with Daniele Ciprì in their former duo Ciprì & Maresco, in which they directed a large number of documentaries and short film, alongside the critically acclaimed The Return of Cagliostro (2003).

His solo credits includes the docu-fictions Belluscone: A Sicilian Story (2014), and The Mafia Is No Longer What It Used to Be (2019) for which he won the Special Jury Prize.

== Filmography ==
=== Solo credits ===
Year	English title	Original title	Notes
2014	Belluscone: A Sicilian Story	Belluscone - una storia siciliana	Special Jury Prize at the Orizzonti section of the 71st Venice International Film Festival
2015	I Don’t Know the Men of this City	Gli uomini di questa città io non li conosco	
2019	The Mafia Is No Longer What It Used to Be	La mafia non è più quella di una volta	Special Jury Prize at the 76th Venice International Film Festival
2023	Lovano Supreme		
2025	Bravo Bene!	Un Film Fatto per Bene	

== See also ==
- Ciprì & Maresco
