= 2010 in Italy =

- Decades: 1990s; 2000s; 2010s; 2020s; 2030s
- See also: History of Italy; Timeline of Italian history; List of years in Italy

Events of 2010 in Italy.

== Incumbents ==
- President: Giorgio Napolitano
- Prime Minister: Silvio Berlusconi (→ Fourth Berlusconi government)

== Events ==
=== January ===
- January 8: Riots break out amongst immigrants and local inhabitants in the town of Rosarno in southern Italy in a protest against an attack on African workers by white youths.
- January 13: Pope Benedict XVI meets and forgives the woman who attacked him at Christmas Eve Mass in 2009.
- January 17: Pope Benedict XVI makes a controversial visit to the Great Synagogue of Rome.
- January 30: Judges across Italy stage a walk out over Prime Minister Silvio Berlusconi's proposed judicial reforms.

=== February ===
- February 9: The Italian Embassy in Iran is attacked by protesters unhappy with Italy's decision to scale back economic dealings and push for tighter sanctions and protests are also held outside French and Dutch embassies. (The Jerusalem Post)
- February 14: Nine Irish Roman Catholic bishops and Cardinal Seán Brady arrive in Rome to discuss the Murphy Report and Ryan Report into the Catholic sexual abuse scandal in Ireland with Pope Benedict XVI, the first such meetings there in eight years. (RTÉ) (Reuters) (Gulf Times) (The Irish Times)
- February 16–20: Sanremo Music Festival 2010, the 60th annual edition held in Teatro Ariston in Sanremo, province of Imperia,
- February 26: The cruise ship MS Costa Europa crashes into a dock in the Egyptian port of Sharm al-Sheikh, killing three people. (BBC) (CNN)
- 12 to 28 February: Italy at the 2010 Winter Olympics: 114 competitors in 13 sports; 1 Gold medal, 1 Silver, 3 Bronze.
- February 23: unknown persons pour millions of liters of hydrocarbons into the Lambro river causing an environmental disaster that involved the valley of the river itself and the Po, in Lombardy and Emilia-Romagna.

=== March ===
- March 3:
  - One German and one Italian man are killed and at least 6 are injured near Marseille in a collision between a 26-foot wave and the Greek-Cypriot cruise ship Louise Majesty which was travelling with 2,000 passengers from Barcelona to Genoa. (Al Jazeera) (USA Today) (Herald Sun) (Irish Independent)
  - 7 suspected weapons traffickers to Iran (2 Iranians, 5 Italians) are detained in Italy with the help of Swiss police. (Al Jazeera) (BBC) (The Times) (The Daily Telegraph) (France24)
- March 20: Hundreds of thousands of people attend a rally in support of Prime Minister Silvio Berlusconi in Rome ahead of this month's elections. (France24) (BBC) (The Sydney Morning Herald) (Al Jazeera) (Reuters)
- March 27: Three deaf men who allege they were sodomised and abused by priests as children appear on RAI Television to confront the diocese of Verona. (Arab News)
- March 28: At a Palm Sunday mass in Saint Peter's Square, Rome, Pope Benedict XVI tells tens of thousands of people about the recent "petty gossip" he has been subjected to, thought to mean the child sexual abuse within the Roman Catholic Church, though he fails to directly mention the scandal. (BBC) (The Observer) (National Post)
- March 28 to 29: 2010 Italian regional elections.

=== April ===
- April: The AppsBuilder project is initiated by Daniele Pelleri and Luigi Giglio in Milan.

=== May ===
- May 1: Pope Benedict XVI will appoint an envoy and a commission to reform Legion of Christ (LC), whose Mexican founder, Marcial Maciel, abused children before being dismissed in 2006.

=== August ===
- August 26: Murder of Sarah Scazzi.

=== September ===
- September 12: Fernando Alonso wins the Italian Grand Prix. This would be Ferrari's last win at Monza until 2019.

== Sports ==
- 2010–11 Serie A
- 2010–11 Serie B
- 2010–11 Coppa Italia
- 2010 Supercoppa Italiana
- 2010 Giro d'Italia
- 2010 Italian Grand Prix
- 2010 Giro di Lombardia

== Deaths ==
- February 8 – Antonio Giolitti, 94, politician
- February 20 – Mario Acerbi, 96, footballer
- April 15 – Raimondo Vianello, 87, television presenter
- May 5 - Giulietta Simionato, 99, operatic mezzo-soprano
- May 18 – Edoardo Sanguineti, 79, poet and writer
- May 25 – Silvius Magnago, 96, politician
- July 8 – Lelio Luttazzi, 87, composer and television presenter
- August 17 – Francesco Cossiga, 82, politician and former President
- September 21 – Sandra Mondaini, 79, actress
- November 10 – Dino De Laurentiis, 91, film producer
- November 29 – Mario Monicelli, 95, actor, screenwriter and director
- November 30 – Berardino Libonati, 76, academic, businessman, jurist and lawyer
- December 18 – Tommaso Padoa-Schioppa, 70, economist and former minister
- December 21 – Enzo Bearzot, 83, footballer and football coach

== See also ==
- 2010 in Italian television
- List of Italian films of 2010
