= Libonati =

Libonati is an Italian surname. Notable people with the surname include:

- Berardino Libonati (1934–2010), Italian academic, businessman, jurist, and lawyer
- Roland V. Libonati (1897–1991), American politician

== See also ==
- Vibonati
- Libonatti
