= Super Bowl XLVII =

2013 National Football League championship game

Baltimore Ravens (4) (AFC) (10–6)	San Francisco 49ers (2) (NFC) (11–4–1)
34	31
Head coach: John Harbaugh	Head coach: Jim Harbaugh
	1	2	3	4	Total
BAL	7	14	7	6	34
SF	3	3	17	8	31
- Date: February 3, 2013
- Kickoff time: 5:30 p.m. CST (UTC-6)
- Stadium: Mercedes-Benz Superdome; New Orleans, Louisiana
- MVP: Joe Flacco, quarterback
- Favorite: 49ers by 4
- Referee: Jerome Boger
- Attendance: 71,024

Ceremonies
- National anthem: Alicia Keys
- Coin toss: Larry Allen, Cris Carter, Curley Culp, Warren Sapp, Bill Parcells, Jonathan Ogden, Dave Robinson
- Halftime show: Beyoncé featuring Destiny's Child

TV in the United States
- Network: CBS
- Announcers: Jim Nantz (play-by-play); Phil Simms (analyst); Steve Tasker and Solomon Wilcots (sideline reporters)
- Nielsen ratings: 46.4 (national); 59.6 (Baltimore); 57.1 (New Orleans); 49.0 (San Francisco); US viewership: 108.69 million est. avg., 164.1 million est. total
- Market share: 69 (national)
- Cost of 30-second commercial: $4 million

Radio in the United States
- Network: Dial Global
- Announcers: Kevin Harlan (play-by-play); Boomer Esiason (analyst); James Lofton and Mark Malone (sideline reporters)

Super Bowl XLVII was an American football game between the American Football Conference (AFC) champion Baltimore Ravens and the National Football Conference (NFC) champion San Francisco 49ers to decide the National Football League (NFL) champion for the 2012 season. The Ravens defeated the 49ers 34–31, handing the 49ers their first Super Bowl loss in their franchise history. The game was played on Sunday, February 3, 2013, at the Mercedes-Benz Superdome in New Orleans, Louisiana. This was the seventh Super Bowl played in the Superdome, and the tenth to be played in New Orleans, equaling Miami's record of ten in an individual city. This was the first Super Bowl to be held in New Orleans since Super Bowl XXXVI and it was the first to be played there since Hurricane Katrina struck the city in 2005.

For the first time in Super Bowl history, the game featured two brothers coaching against each other – Jim and John Harbaugh, head coaches of the 49ers and Ravens, respectively – earning it the nickname Har-bowl. Jim's son and John's nephew, Jay Harbaugh, was also on the Ravens' coaching staff. Super Bowl XLVII was the first to feature two teams that had undefeated records in previous Super Bowl games (the Ravens, 1–0; the 49ers, 5–0). The 49ers, who posted a regular-season record of 11–4–1, entered the game seeking their sixth Super Bowl win in team history (and first since Super Bowl XXIX at the end of the 1994 season), which would have tied the Pittsburgh Steelers for the most by a franchise. The Ravens, who posted a 10–6 regular-season record, made their second Super Bowl appearance in franchise history, having previously won Super Bowl XXXV. Linebacker Ray Lewis, the Most Valuable Player (MVP) from that game, as well as the last remaining member of the inaugural Ravens roster from 1996, also played in this game, his and 49ers wide receiver Randy Moss' last before both retired from professional football.

The Ravens dominated the first half of the game, aided by quarterback Joe Flacco's three touchdown passes that gave the Ravens a 21–3 lead before their lead was cut to 21–6 just before halftime; the Ravens immediately resumed scoring after Jacoby Jones returned the second half kickoff a record 108 yards, increasing their lead to 28–6. However, a partial power outage in the Mercedes-Benz Superdome following the return suspended play for 34 minutes (earning the game the added nickname of the Blackout Bowl). After play resumed, the 49ers began to rally, scoring 17 unanswered third-quarter points to cut the Ravens' lead to 28–23. With the Ravens leading late in the game, 34–29, the 49ers drove down to the Ravens' 7-yard line just before the two-minute warning but turned the ball over on downs.

The Ravens then took an intentional safety in the waning moments of the game to preserve the victory. Flacco, who completed 22 of 33 passes for 287 yards and three touchdowns, became the fourth consecutive quarterback to be named Super Bowl MVP, after Drew Brees at Super Bowl XLIV, Aaron Rodgers at Super Bowl XLV, and Eli Manning at Super Bowl XLVI.

CBS broadcast the game in the United States, and charged an average of $4 million for a 30-second commercial during the game, the highest rate for any Super Bowl. According to Nielsen, Super Bowl XLVII was viewed by an estimated average of 108.69 million people in the United States, with a record 164.1 million tuning into at least six minutes of the game. Beyoncé performed in the Super Bowl XLVII halftime show, which featured a reunion with fellow Destiny's Child alumni Kelly Rowland and Michelle Williams.

As of 2026, this is the most recent major professional sports championship won by a Baltimore-based team.

== Background ==
The game marked the first Super Bowl in which both of the teams had appeared, but had not yet lost a previous Super Bowl; the 49ers came into the game having won all five of their previous Super Bowl appearances, while the Ravens had won in their lone previous Super Bowl appearance in Super Bowl XXXV against the New York Giants. Currently, this phenomenon can only be repeated if either the Ravens or the New York Jets play against either the Tampa Bay Buccaneers or the New Orleans Saints in a subsequent Super Bowl. Baltimore's victory made them the only current NFL franchise to have appeared in at least two Super Bowls without ever losing any of their appearances; this feat was later equaled by the Tampa Bay Buccaneers.

=== Host-selection process ===
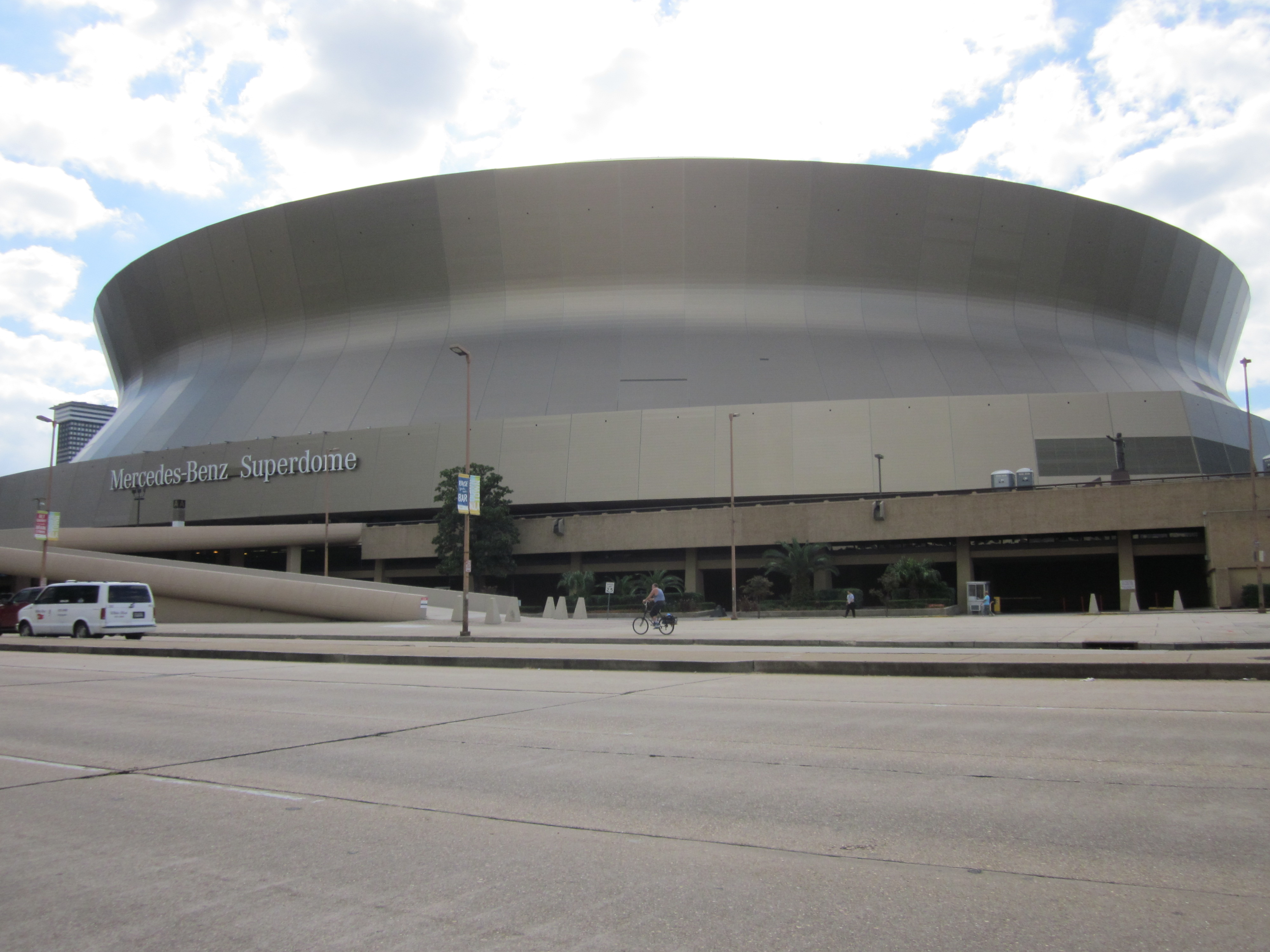
The Mercedes-Benz Superdome was selected as the host site for Super Bowl XLVII

Three cities presented bids for the game:

- New Orleans, on behalf of Mercedes-Benz Superdome
- Glendale, Arizona, on behalf of University of Phoenix Stadium
- Miami Gardens, Florida, on behalf of Sun Life Stadium

The league then selected the New Orleans bid during the NFL's Spring Ownership Meetings in Fort Lauderdale, Florida on May 19, 2009. This was the tenth time that the city has hosted the Super Bowl, by far the most by an individual city and once again tying with the Miami area for the most Super Bowls hosted by a metropolitan area. It was the first Super Bowl to be held in New Orleans since the Superdome sustained damage from Hurricane Katrina in 2005, as well as since the naming rights of the Superdome were sold to Mercedes-Benz while it was undergoing a major renovation in 2011, including the addition of Champions Square. New Orleans artist Ally Burguieres was selected to design the official medallion for Super Bowl XLVII, which was included on beads to commemorate the Mardi Gras tradition.

Because of the February 3 date of Super Bowl XLVII, the 2013 Mardi Gras calendar in Orleans Parish was changed. Parades scheduled for February 3 and before were moved ahead one week. The same situation occurred in 2002 when the 9/11 attacks caused a one-week delay in the 2001 NFL season, resulting in the Super Bowl XXXVI falling within the Mardi Gras parade calendar.

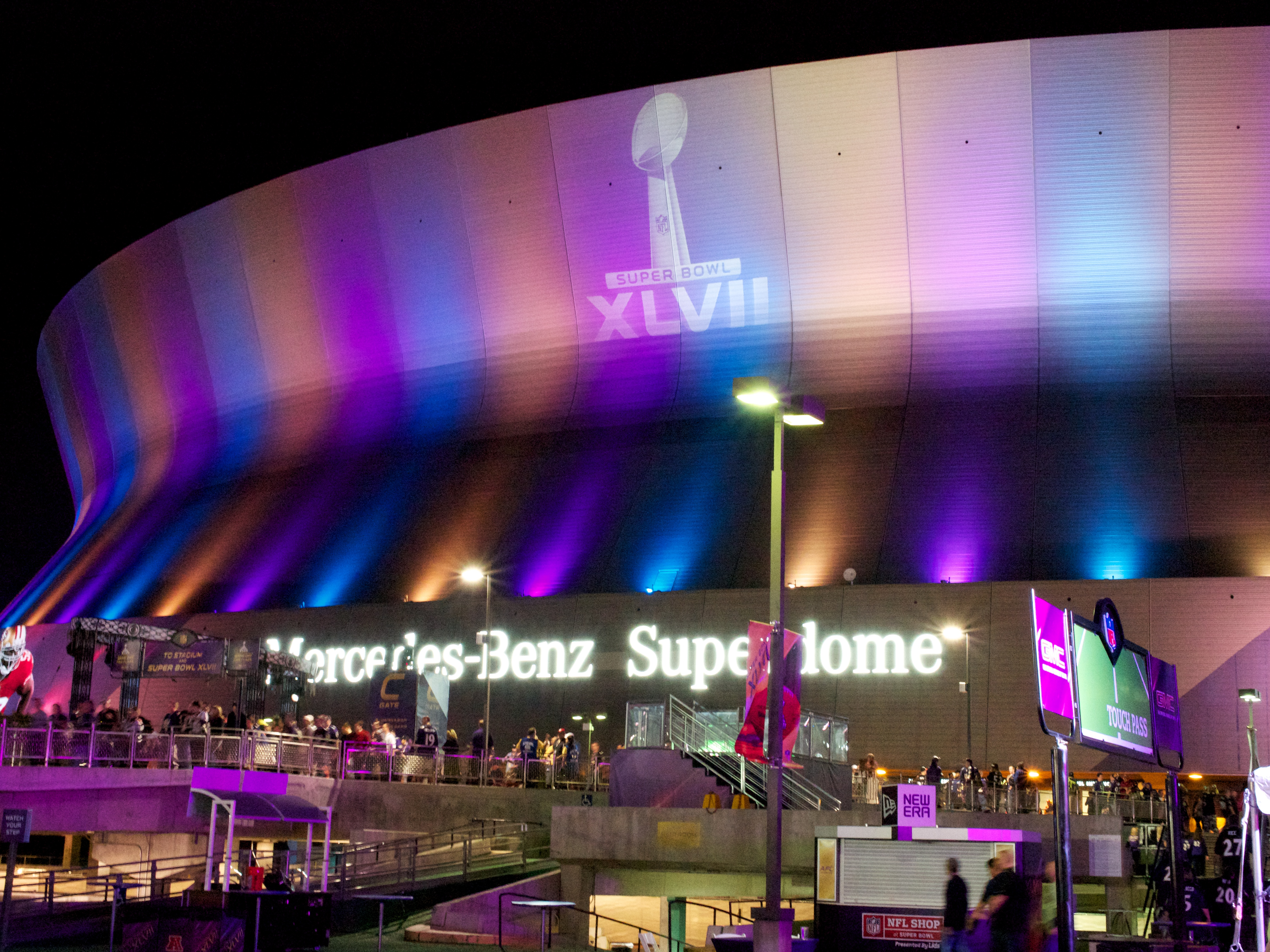
Mercedes-Benz Superdome following Super Bowl XLVII

This was the 49ers' second Super Bowl played at the Superdome—the first being Super Bowl XXIV when they beat the Denver Broncos 55–10. The 49ers, Broncos and New England Patriots are the only teams so far to play two or more Super Bowls at the Superdome. The 49ers also joined the Broncos and the Colts in playing two Super Bowls at two stadiums. The 49ers won Super Bowls XXIII and XXIX in Miami at what is now known as Hard Rock Stadium.

=== Nicknames ===
Super Bowl XLVII earned many nicknames, including the "Bro Bowl", "Har-Bowl", "HarBowl", "Super Baugh", "Brother Bowl", and "Superbro", as this was the first Super Bowl featuring brothers as opposing head coaches: Baltimore's John Harbaugh and San Francisco's Jim Harbaugh, whose clubs previously met in a 2011 Thanksgiving Day game, which John Harbaugh's Ravens won 16–6, which was also the first time that two brothers had met as rival head coaches in the NFL. Due to a power outage affecting half the stadium during the third quarter, the game has also become known as the "Blackout Bowl".

== Teams ==
=== Baltimore Ravens ===
After going 12–4 and reaching the AFC Championship Game in 2011, only to lose to the New England Patriots when wide receiver Lee Evans dropped a game-winning catch in the end zone and Billy Cundiff missed a potential game-tying 32-yard field goal, the Ravens advanced further in 2012 to the Super Bowl after recording a 10–6 regular season record. Under head coach John Harbaugh, who was in his fifth season with the team, Baltimore upgraded their roster with players such as defensive backs Sean Considine and Corey Graham, and wide receiver Jacoby Jones. In December 2012, the Ravens fired offensive coordinator Cam Cameron and promoted quarterbacks coach Jim Caldwell, who was previously the head coach of the Indianapolis Colts from 2009 to 2011, as the successor. With personnel on both sides of the ball, they finished the season ranked 10th in points per game (24.9), and 12th in fewest points allowed (21.5)

In command of the offense was five-year veteran Joe Flacco, who finished the season with a career-high 3,817 passing yards and 22 touchdowns, with only 10 interceptions. (Super Bowl XLVII would be one of only two years the AFC team's quarterback would not be either Tom Brady, Ben Roethlisberger or Peyton Manning between Super Bowls XXXVI and LIII; the other was Super Bowl XXXVII ten years prior, when the 2002 Oakland Raiders were helmed by Rich Gannon.) His top targets were receivers Anquan Boldin (65 receptions, 921 yards, 4 touchdowns) and Torrey Smith (49 receptions, 855 yards, 8 touchdowns), along with tight end Dennis Pitta (61 receptions, 669 yards, 7 touchdowns). Their backfield featured two Pro Bowl selections: halfback Ray Rice and fullback Vonta Leach. Rice rushed for 1,143 yards and 9 touchdowns, while also hauling in 61 receptions for 478 yards and another score. Leach served effectively as his lead blocker and a receiver out of the backfield, catching 21 passes. The Ravens' offensive line was led by Pro Bowl guard Marshal Yanda, and 14-year veteran center Matt Birk.

On special teams, Jones returned 38 kickoffs for 1,116 yards and two touchdowns, giving him a whopping 30.7 yards per return average. He also gained 341 yards and another touchdown returning punts, and caught 30 passes for 406 yards and a score. Rookie kicker Justin Tucker ranked 7th in the NFL in field goal percentage (90.9), kicking 30/33 field goals and making all 42 of his extra point attempts.

Baltimore's defensive line was anchored by Pro Bowl defensive end Haloti Ngata, who compiled 51 tackles and 5 sacks, along with defensive tackle Arthur Jones (47 tackles, 4.5 sacks). The Ravens also had an excellent set of linebackers, such as Paul Kruger, Dannell Ellerbe, Jameel McClain, Terrell Suggs, and Ray Lewis. Kruger led the team in sacks with 9, while Ellerbe added 92 tackles and 4.5 sacks. McClain had 79 tackles. Suggs, a ten-year veteran and five-time Pro Bowl selection, who had missed the first half of the regular season with a partially torn Achilles tendon, made a speedy recovery and was key in the Ravens' win over the Broncos in the divisional round of the playoffs with 2 sacks on Broncos quarterback Peyton Manning. Lewis, a 17-year veteran and 13-time Pro Bowl selection, had missed most of the season with an arm injury, but still managed to rack up 57 tackles in just 6 games. Then shortly before returning for the playoffs, he announced his plans to retire after the postseason, and promptly went on to amass 44 tackles in Baltimore's four playoff games.

The Ravens secondary featured Pro Bowl safety Ed Reed, the NFL's all-time leader in interception return yardage. Reed had another statistically successful season in 2012, recording 58 tackles and 4 interceptions. Cornerback Cary Williams was also a big contributor with 4 interceptions and 75 tackles.

The team dedicated their 2012 season to former owner and founder Art Modell, who died on September 6, 2012, four days before the first regular season game.

=== San Francisco 49ers ===
The 49ers had recently emerged as a dominant team after nearly a decade of ineptitude. During the 1980s and 1990s, they had been one of the NFL top contenders, playing in ten conference championship games and winning five Super Bowls. After a strong 2002 season, San Francisco went into a dismal slump in which they failed to make the playoffs for eight consecutive seasons. Following the end of the 2010 season, the 49ers hired Jim Harbaugh as their head coach. Harbaugh, who played 14 years in the NFL, joined the team after an impressive 12–1 season as the coach of Stanford, and in his first season with San Francisco he managed to turn their fortunes around, aided by breakout seasons from quarterback Alex Smith and receiver Michael Crabtree.

Smith entered the 2012 season as the starting quarterback, but missed two starts mid-season after suffering a concussion, and second-year backup Colin Kaepernick successfully filled in. A quarterback controversy then began because Smith was ranked third in the NFL in passer rating (104.1), led the league in completion percentage (70%), and had been 19–5–1 as a starter under Harbaugh, while Kaepernick was considered more dynamic with his scrambling ability and arm strength. After Smith was fully recovered, Harbaugh chose Kaepernick as the starter for the 8–2–1 49ers, but also stated that the assignment was week-to-week and not necessarily permanent. Kaepernick ended up being the starter for the rest of the season and led the team to an 11–4–1 record, throwing for 1,814 yards and 10 touchdowns, with just 3 interceptions and a 98.4 passer rating, while also rushing for 415 yards and 5 touchdowns.

San Francisco's top receiver was Crabtree, who caught 85 passes for a career-high 1,105 yards and 9 touchdowns. Other key contributors to the passing game included tight end Vernon Davis (41 receptions for 538 yards and 5 touchdowns) along with offseason acquired receivers Mario Manningham and Randy Moss. Manningham had been signed away from the defending Super Bowl champion New York Giants, while Moss, the NFL's second all-time leader in receiving yards, had been signed out of retirement after missing the previous season. The 49ers' backfield featured Pro Bowl running back Frank Gore, who rushed for 1,214 yards and 8 touchdowns, while also catching 28 passes for 234 yards and another score. The team also had a strong offensive line with two Pro Bowl linemen, left tackle Joe Staley and left guard Mike Iupati.

On special teams, punter Andy Lee led the NFL in net yards per punt (43.2) and ranked 5th in gross yards per punt (48.1). He planted 36 punts inside the 20-yard line with just 5 touchbacks. Kicker David Akers had a relatively bad year overall, converting only 69 percent of his field goal attempts, but in the week 1 contest against the Green Bay Packers tied the NFL record for the longest field goal with a successful 63-yard attempt. Receiver Ted Ginn Jr. returned 32 punts for 326 yards and 11 kickoffs for 253.

The 49ers' strongest unit was their defense, which ranked 2nd in fewest points allowed per game (17.1) and sent 6 of their 11 starters to the Pro Bowl. Pro Bowl defensive end Justin Smith led the line with 66 tackles and 3 sacks. Behind him, all four of the team's starting linebackers—Aldon Smith, NaVorro Bowman, Patrick Willis and Ahmad Brooks—were named to the 2012 All-Pro Team, and all but Brooks made the Pro Bowl. Aldon Smith set a franchise record with 19.5 sacks, more than the rest of the team had combined. Willis ranked second on the team with 120 tackles and picked off two passes, while Bowman's 149 tackles were second most in the NFL. The 49ers secondary featured Pro Bowl safeties Dashon Goldson and Donte Whitner.

=== Playoffs ===
The Ravens finished the season as the AFC North champion and the number-4 seed in the AFC. The Ravens began their playoff run at home against the number-5 seed Indianapolis Colts in the wild-card round in what would turn out to be Ray Lewis's final career home game. The Ravens defeated the Colts 24–9, with Flacco throwing for 288 yards and two touchdowns, while their defense held the Colts to just 9 points, 13 below their regular season average.

In the divisional round, the Ravens would face the top-seeded Denver Broncos, who came into the game with an 11-game winning streak. The Ravens fell behind late in the game, but with less than a minute left on the clock, Flacco's 70-yard touchdown pass to Jacoby Jones sent the game into overtime, a play that is known as the Mile High Miracle. An interception by Corey Graham from Peyton Manning late in the first overtime period set up Tucker's 47-yard field goal to win the game 1:42 into double overtime.

Finally, the Ravens advanced to the Super Bowl by overcoming a 13–7 halftime deficit and then beating the second-seeded New England Patriots in the AFC Championship Game 28–13, avenging the Ravens' loss against the Patriots in the 2011 AFC Championship Game, forcing three turnovers total, intercepting two of Tom Brady's passes, and keeping the Patriots scoreless in the second half. By winning the game, the Ravens handed Brady his first (and only) AFC Championship Game loss at home.

As the NFC West champion and the number 2 seed in the NFC, the 49ers earned a first-round bye. The 49ers started their playoff run against the number 3 seed Green Bay Packers in the divisional round. Jim Harbaugh's decision to start Kaepernick for the playoffs came into immediate question when he threw an interception that was returned for a touchdown by Sam Shields on their opening drive, but this turned out to be the only miscue he would make for the rest of the game, as well as the only interception he would throw until the Super Bowl. By the end of the game, Kaepernick racked up 444 total yards (more than the entire Packers team), including 181 rushing yards, the NFL single game record for rushing yards by a quarterback, as the 49ers went on to win 45–31.

The 49ers then faced the top-seeded Atlanta Falcons in the NFC Championship Game, where they quickly fell behind 17–0 in the first half. No team in NFC Championship Game history had ever overcome a deficit that large, but the 49ers proved up to the challenge, cutting the score to 24–21 going into the final quarter. Late in the game, the 49ers' comeback hopes suffered a setback when Crabtree lost a fumble on the 1-yard line as he was going in for the leading score. However, the 49ers defense forced a punt, and Ted Ginn Jr.'s 20-yard return set up a touchdown run by Gore. The 49ers defense then held firm, forcing a turnover on downs at their 10-yard line to secure the victory.

=== Pregame notes ===
This was the first Super Bowl since Super Bowl XXXVII ten years prior that did not feature the New England Patriots, Indianapolis Colts, or the Pittsburgh Steelers as the AFC representatives, and the only Super Bowl between 2003 and 2019 not to feature Tom Brady, Ben Roethlisberger or Peyton Manning. Baltimore defeated the Colts and Patriots during the playoffs while the Steelers failed to make the playoffs. By contrast, the NFC had a different member go to the Super Bowl almost every year during that same span, with the New York Giants (who won Super Bowls XLII and XLVI) being the only NFC team to make two appearances during that span. With the 49ers making their first Super Bowl appearance since Super Bowl XXIX, this left the Dallas Cowboys (last appeared in Super Bowl XXX), Detroit Lions (never appeared in a Super Bowl), Minnesota Vikings (last appeared in Super Bowl XI) and Washington Commanders (last appeared in Super Bowl XXVI as the Washington Redskins) as the only NFC teams not to play in a Super Bowl since 1998; the Cowboys are the only one of those four franchises that have not reached the NFC Championship Game since then.

This was the sixth time in seven seasons in which one of the participants advanced to the Super Bowl after not having a first-round bye in the Wild Card playoffs, and was the last time to occur under the twelve team playoff structure.

The 49ers attempted to follow the 2012 World Series championship victory of Major League Baseball's San Francisco Giants. The last time a metropolitan area won the World Series and Super Bowl in the same season was when the Boston Red Sox won the 2004 World Series followed by the Patriots winning Super Bowl XXXIX (and the Patriots won Super Bowl XXXVIII earlier in 2004).

As the 49ers – who were attempting to join the New York Giants and Green Bay Packers as the only teams to win a Super Bowl in three decades – were the designated home team in the annual rotation between AFC and NFC teams, San Francisco elected to wear their red jerseys, which they wore in Super Bowls XIX, XXIII, and XXIX (wearing an alternate throwback red jersey with three-dimensional numerals in XXIX), and gold pants (worn in their first four Super Bowl appearances) for the first time since Super Bowl XXIV (having worn white pants in XXIX along with the aforementioned throwback jerseys). The Ravens wore white jerseys as they did in Super Bowl XXXV, but with black-colored pants this time instead of white. Due to the Ravens having their Art Modell memorial patch on the left side of their jerseys, the team wore their Super Bowl XLVII patch on the right side.

Much of the pregame media hype centered around the Harbaugh brothers, and how their father Jack, a former college football head coach, raised them. On January 24, Jack, along with his wife Jackie and daughter Joani, conducted a media conference call, answering questions about John and Jim. Jackie jokingly asked if the game could end in a tie, before stating that the family was staying neutral but remain excited that both John and Jim brought their respective teams to the Super Bowl. The Harbaugh brothers then conducted a joint press conference on the Friday before the game, which is unusual for opposing Super Bowl coaches, but it was done because of the historic nature of the game.

== Broadcasting ==
=== Television ===
==== United States ====
The game was carried by CBS in the United States, with Jim Nantz calling play-by-play and Phil Simms as color analyst. Steve Tasker and Solomon Wilcots served as sideline reporters. The pregame show, The Super Bowl Today, was hosted by James Brown and featuring analysts Dan Marino, Boomer Esiason, Shannon Sharpe and Bill Cowher.

A special episode of Elementary would be the lead-out program of this Super Bowl.

The game was later featured as one of the NFL's Greatest Games under the title "Change of Momentum".

=== Advertising ===
According to CBS, the price of a 30-second advertisement hit a record high US $4,000,000. General Motors announced it would not advertise on the game, citing the advertising costs.

Adbowl had a special theme this year for the Super Bowl, called "Catbowl 2013", which pitted the best commercials by votes with cat videos to see which one is more popular.

The advertisers for Super Bowl XLVII included Mercedes-Benz, Gildan, Samsung, BlackBerry, Kraft Foods, Subway, Taco Bell, Procter & Gamble, Best Buy, Coca-Cola, Sodastream, PepsiCo (including entries in the Doritos Crash the Super Bowl contest), Axe, Audi, Kia Motors, Ford Motor Company, Wonderful Pistachios, GoDaddy, and perpetual Super Bowl advertiser Anheuser-Busch. Ram Trucks and the Future Farmers of America ran a two-minute commercial based on the Paul Harvey speech "So God Made a Farmer." Movie studios Paramount Pictures, Universal Studios and Walt Disney Studios paying for movie trailers to be aired during the Super Bowl. With Paramount paying for Star Trek Into Darkness, G.I. Joe: Retaliation and World War Z, Universal paying for the debut trailer for Fast & Furious 6 that followed Monsters vs. Aliens' footsteps and Disney paying for Iron Man 3, The Lone Ranger and Oz the Great and Powerful.

==== International ====
An international feed designed for areas less familiar with American football was produced by NFL Network, with Bob Papa (the regular-season voice of the New York Giants) calling play-by-play and Joe Theismann as color analyst. The NFL claimed that this feed would go to 180 countries.

- Australia: Network Ten / One, ESPN on Foxtel. All used CBS commentary and feed
- Austria: Puls 4.
- Brazil: TV Esporte Interativo and ESPN.
- Canada: CTV simulcast CBS' coverage in Canada, with simultaneous substitution expected to be invoked. The CTV coverage was simulcast online within Canada by TSN.ca, and in French on RDS.
- China: Shanghai Media Group controls broadcast rights to the game.
- Czech Republic: Sport 1.
- Denmark: TV3+.
- Finland: Nelonen Pro 1 with Finnish commentary and Nelonen Pro 2 with English commentary.
- France: W9 and BeIN Sport.
- Germany: ESPN America, Sat.1 and Sport1
- Hungary: Sport 1.
- India: STAR Sports and ESPN India.
- Ireland: BBC and Sky Sports.
- Israel: Sport 5
- Italy: Sportitalia 2
- Japan: NHK
- Mexico: Azteca 7, Canal 5 and ESPN.
- Norway: Viasat 4, Viasat Sport.
- Philippines: Fox Sports Asia and Solar Sports. Both used the NFL Network feed.
- Poland: Polsat Sport, ESPN America.
- Portugal: Sport TV.
- Romania: Sport 1.
- Russia: NTV Plus.
- South Africa: ESPN America.
- Sweden: TV10.
- United Kingdom: BBC and Sky Sports.

=== Streaming ===
For the second consecutive year, a webcast of the broadcast was provided, this time on CBSSports.com.

=== Radio ===
In the United States, the game was carried nationwide over the Dial Global radio network, with Kevin Harlan as play-by-play announcer, Boomer Esiason as color analyst, and James Lofton and Mark Malone as sideline reporters. Univision Radio broadcast the game in Spanish.

Each team's flagship station also carried the game: WIYY and WBAL broadcast the game in Baltimore, with Gerry Sandusky on play-by-play and Stan White and Qadry Ismail on color commentary. In San Francisco, the game was broadcast on KSAN-FM and KNBR, with Ted Robinson on play-by-play, Eric Davis on color commentary, and Rod Brooks reporting from the sidelines. Both WBAL and KNBR are clear-channel stations, which allowed the local commentaries to be heard throughout the Eastern and Western United States, respectively. Per contractual rules, the rest of the stations in the 49ers' and Ravens' radio networks carried the Dial Global feed.

Internationally, the game was carried on radio as follows:

- Canada: TSN Radio (Dial Global simulcast)
- United Kingdom: BBC Radio 5 Sports Extra

Sirius XM Radio and NFL Audio Pass carried the local, Dial Global, and select international audio feeds.

== Entertainment ==
=== Pregame ===
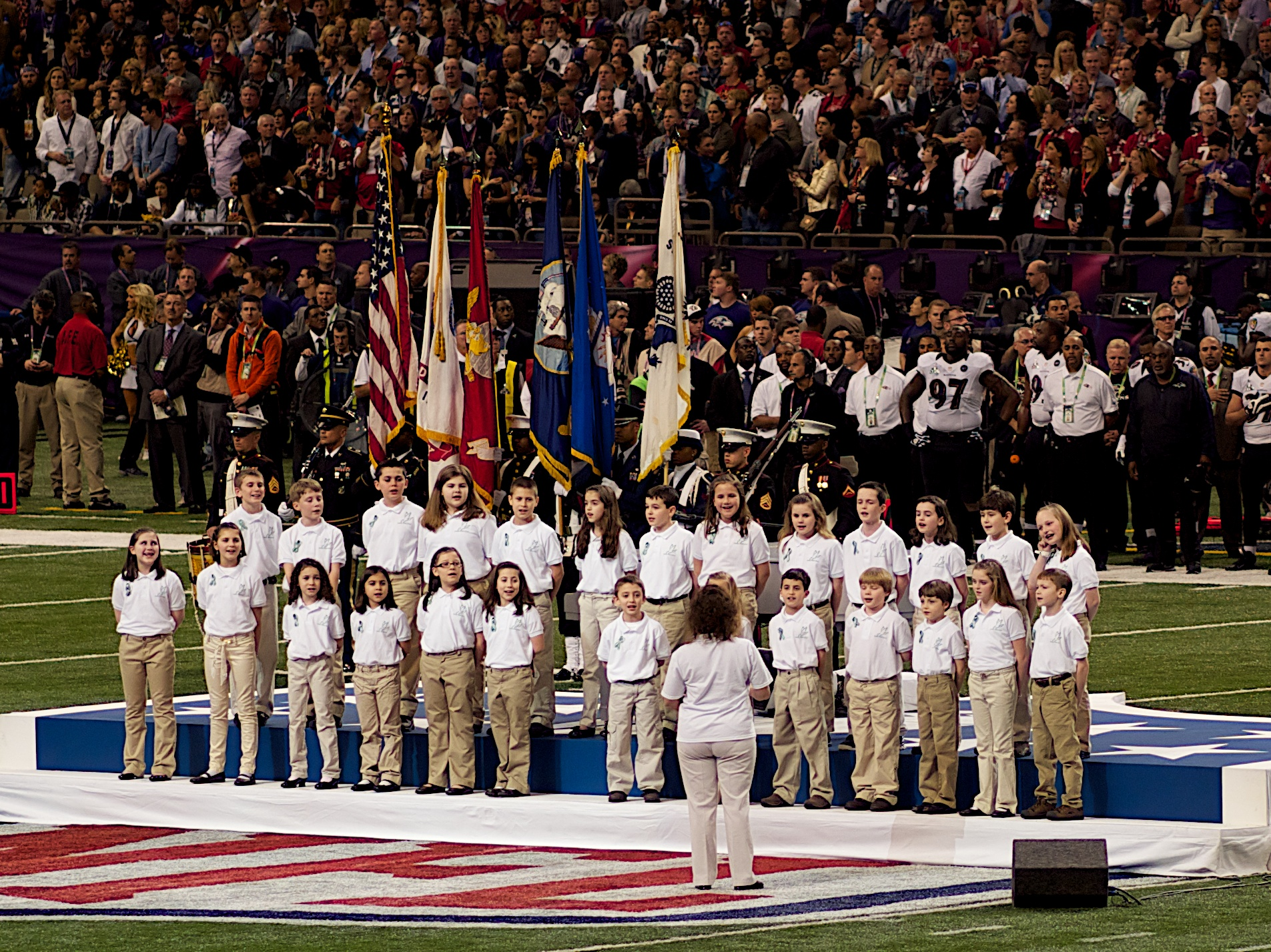
Sandy Hook Elementary School Choir performing before Super Bowl XLVII

On January 18, 2013, the league announced that Alicia Keys would sing the national anthem. Keys stated that she would not perform the song traditionally and instead would perform it as if it were "a brand-new song."

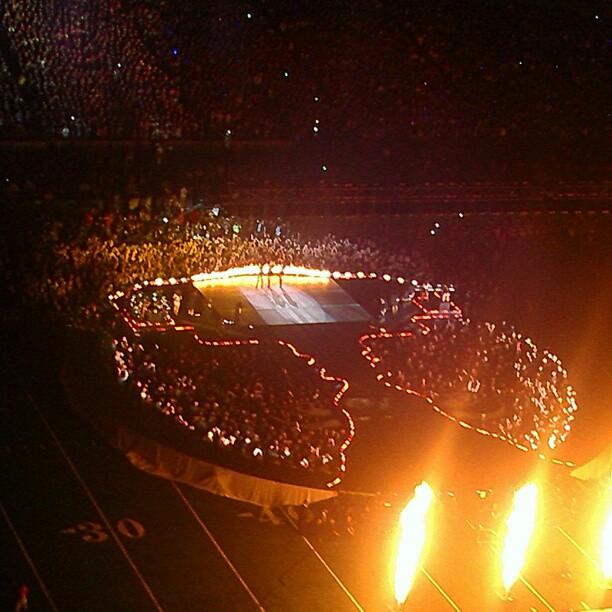
The halftime show featuring Beyoncé

Singer Jennifer Hudson and a chorus of several students from Sandy Hook Elementary School in Newtown, Connecticut, performed "America the Beautiful" as a tribute to the 26 students and staff who were murdered at the school the previous year.

There was also a pregame performance by the world-renowned “Human Jukebox” from Southern University.

The coin toss ceremony featured the recent inductees to the Pro Football Hall of Fame: Larry Allen, Cris Carter, Curley Culp, Warren Sapp, Bill Parcells, Jonathan Ogden, and Dave Robinson.

=== Halftime ===
On October 16, 2012, Beyoncé was chosen as the headline performer for the Super Bowl halftime show, with a reunited Destiny's Child also appearing as part of the show. Despite initial reports that mentioned Beyoncé's husband, Jay Z, was a potential collaborator on the show, he did not make an appearance.

Beyoncé's performance had an estimated 104 million viewers.

== Game summary ==
External videos
- Full game broadcast on CBS on YouTube

=== First quarter ===
The 49ers were hurt by penalties and turnovers early in the game as the Ravens built a 21–6 first-half lead. On their first play of the opening drive, tight end Vernon Davis's 20-yard reception was called back by an illegal formation penalty. The 49ers ended up punting after three more plays, and wide receiver Jacoby Jones returned the ball 17 yards to the Ravens' 49-yard line. The Ravens then drove 51 yards in six plays, which included a 20-yard pass from quarterback Joe Flacco to wide receiver Torrey Smith, and ended with Flacco's 13-yard touchdown pass to wide receiver Anquan Boldin. Flacco had previously thrown a third-down incompletion, but an offsides penalty against linebacker Ahmad Brooks gave him a second chance.

The 49ers responded on their next possession, moving the ball 62 yards in a 12-play drive, with quarterback Colin Kaepernick completing a 19-yard pass to wide receiver Michael Crabtree and a 24-yarder to Davis. Kicker David Akers finished the drive with a 36-yard field goal to cut the 49ers' deficit to 7–3. The Ravens responded with a drive to the 49ers' 37-yard line, featuring a 30-yard catch by Boldin, but had to punt after Flacco was sacked on third down for a 5-yard loss by defensive end Ray McDonald, pushing the Ravens out of field goal range.

=== Second quarter ===
On the 49ers' next drive, Kaepernick completed back-to-back passes to Davis for 29 and 11 yards to reach the Ravens' 24-yard line, but three plays later, safety Corey Graham held up running back LaMichael James, allowing linebacker Courtney Upshaw to knock the ball loose, with defensive end Arthur Jones recovering the fumble on the 25-yard line. Baltimore then drove 75 yards in 10 plays; 41 of those yards came from 23-and-14-yard completions from Flacco to tight end Ed Dickson, the rest followed by a face-mask penalty on safety Donte Whitner. Tight end Dennis Pitta caught a 1-yard touchdown pass on the final play of the drive, increasing the Ravens' lead to 14–3.

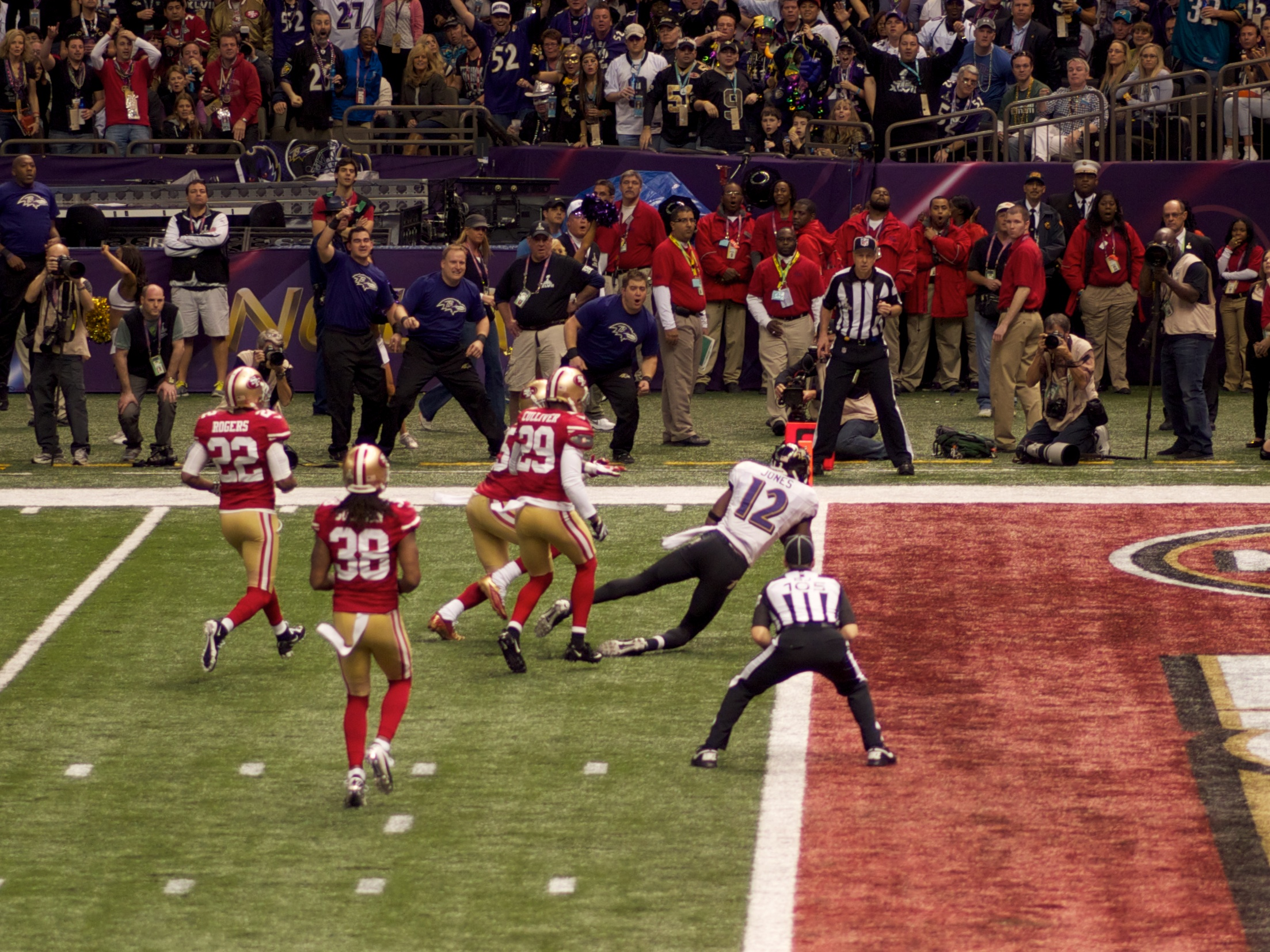
Jacoby Jones dives for the end zone during the second quarter.

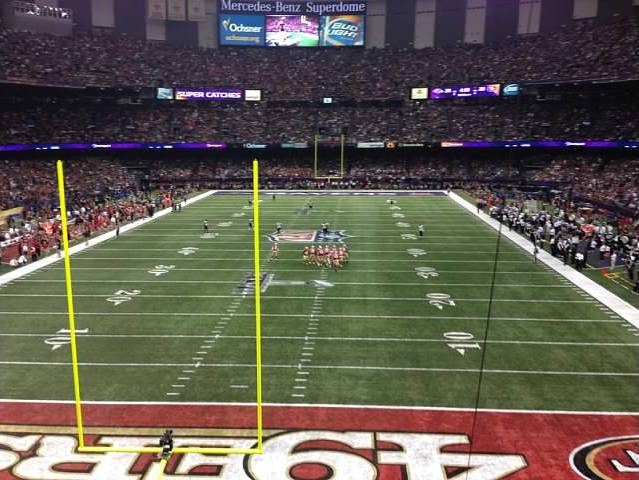
View from the south end zone during the first half of the game.

On the first play of the 49ers' next drive, safety Ed Reed intercepted a pass by Kaepernick and returned the ball 6 yards to the 49ers' 38-yard line. This was the first interception thrown by the 49ers in any of their six Super Bowl appearances. Unnecessary roughness penalties were called after the play on players from both teams, so the penalties offset. The Ravens reached the 14-yard line on their ensuing possession, but on 4th-and-9, kicker Justin Tucker was stopped 1 yard short of a first down while running the ball on a fake 32-yard field goal attempt, turning the ball over on downs. It was the first fake field goal attempt in Super Bowl history.

The 49ers were forced to a three-and-out on their next drive. Jones muffed the punt, but recovered the ball and returned it 11 yards to his own 44-yard line. After Flacco's first two passes fell incomplete, Jones made a falling catch deep down the field, then got back up and eluded defensive backs Chris Culliver and Dashon Goldson en route to a 56-yard touchdown reception, increasing the Ravens' lead to 21–3 with less than two minutes to go in the half. On the second play of the 49ers' next drive, tight end Delanie Walker caught a 14-yard pass from Kaepernick, which was extended by a 15-yard roughing-the-passer penalty against defensive tackle Haloti Ngata. After an incomplete first down attempt, Walker received another 28-yard pass, putting the 49ers on the Ravens' 17-yard line. The 49ers reached the 9-yard line, but were unable to convert on three plays. On the last play of the half, Akers kicked his second field goal, a 27-yarder, to cut their deficit to 21–6.

=== Third quarter ===
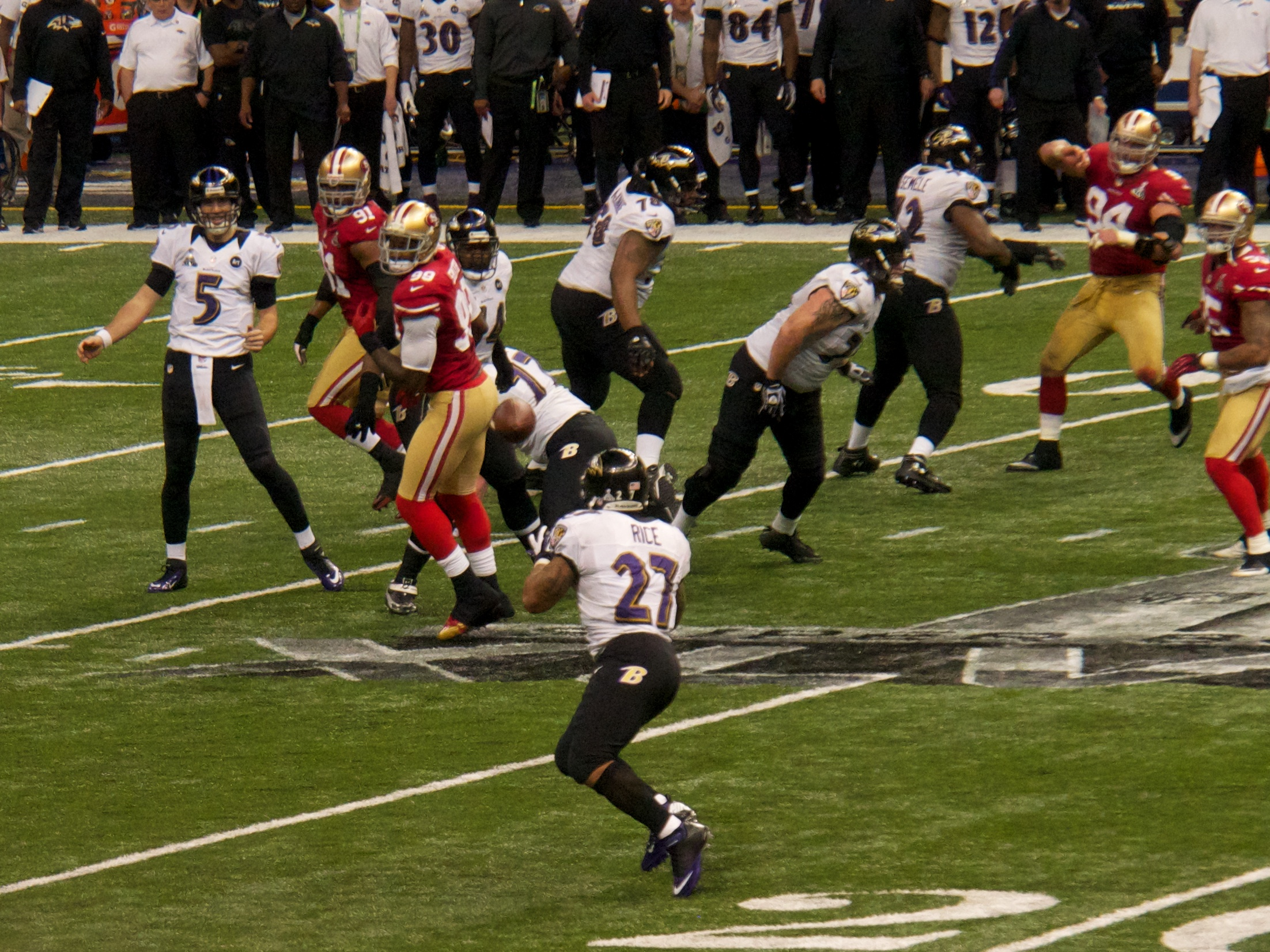
Baltimore Ravens quarterback Joe Flacco attempts a pass to Ray Rice.

On the second-half kickoff, Jones fielded the kick and promptly returned it 108 yards for the longest play in Super Bowl history. It broke the previous 104-yard record for the longest kickoff return in the playoffs (set by Trindon Holliday of the Denver Broncos in the Divisional Round game three weeks earlier against the Ravens), and it tied an NFL record already held by Jones and shared with Ellis Hobbs and Randall Cobb for the longest kickoff return. The immediate score gave the Ravens a 28–6 lead.

Three plays into the 49ers' next drive, a power outage caused the lights to go out in half of the stadium, stopping play for 34 minutes. The outage was caused by equipment failure near the stadium.

After play resumed, both teams exchanged punts, and the 49ers began to get some momentum going throughout the rest of the quarter. They drove 80 yards in seven plays, with Kaepernick rushing twice for 20 total yards and completing an 18-yard pass to Davis before finishing the drive with a pass to Crabtree, who subsequently broke tackles by defensive backs Cary Williams and Bernard Pollard on the way to a 31-yard touchdown reception, cutting the 49ers' deficit to 28–13. Then the Ravens were forced to punt from their own 9-yard line following Brooks' 8-yard sack on Flacco on third down, and wide receiver Ted Ginn Jr. returned the ball 32 yards to the Ravens' 20-yard line before being forced out of bounds by punter Sam Koch. Kaepernick completed a 14-yard pass to Davis on the next play, and running back Frank Gore followed it up with a 6-yard touchdown run, cutting the 49ers' deficit to one possession at 28–20.

On the second play of the Ravens' next drive, they committed their only non-downs turnover when cornerback Tarell Brown forced and recovered a fumble from running back Ray Rice on the Ravens' 25-yard line. Four plays later, Akers missed a 39-yard field goal attempt wide left, but Ravens cornerback Chykie Brown was penalized for running into the kicker, and Akers' second attempt was good from 34 yards, trimming the score to 28–23.

=== Fourth quarter ===
The Ravens responded on their ensuing possession, moving the ball 71 yards and advancing to the 49ers' 1-yard line, with Boldin catching two passes for 39 yards. But they were unable to reach the end zone and settled for Tucker's 19-yard field goal to put them back up by eight points, 31–23. The 49ers stormed back, advancing 76 yards in just five plays. Following a 32-yard reception by wide receiver Randy Moss (the final catch of his career) and a 21-yard burst by Gore, Kaepernick took the ball into the end zone on a 15-yard run, the longest touchdown run by a quarterback in Super Bowl history. However, the 49ers were unable to tie the game on the two-point conversion attempt when Kaepernick's pass sailed high over Moss' head, so the score remained 31–29 in favor of the Ravens.

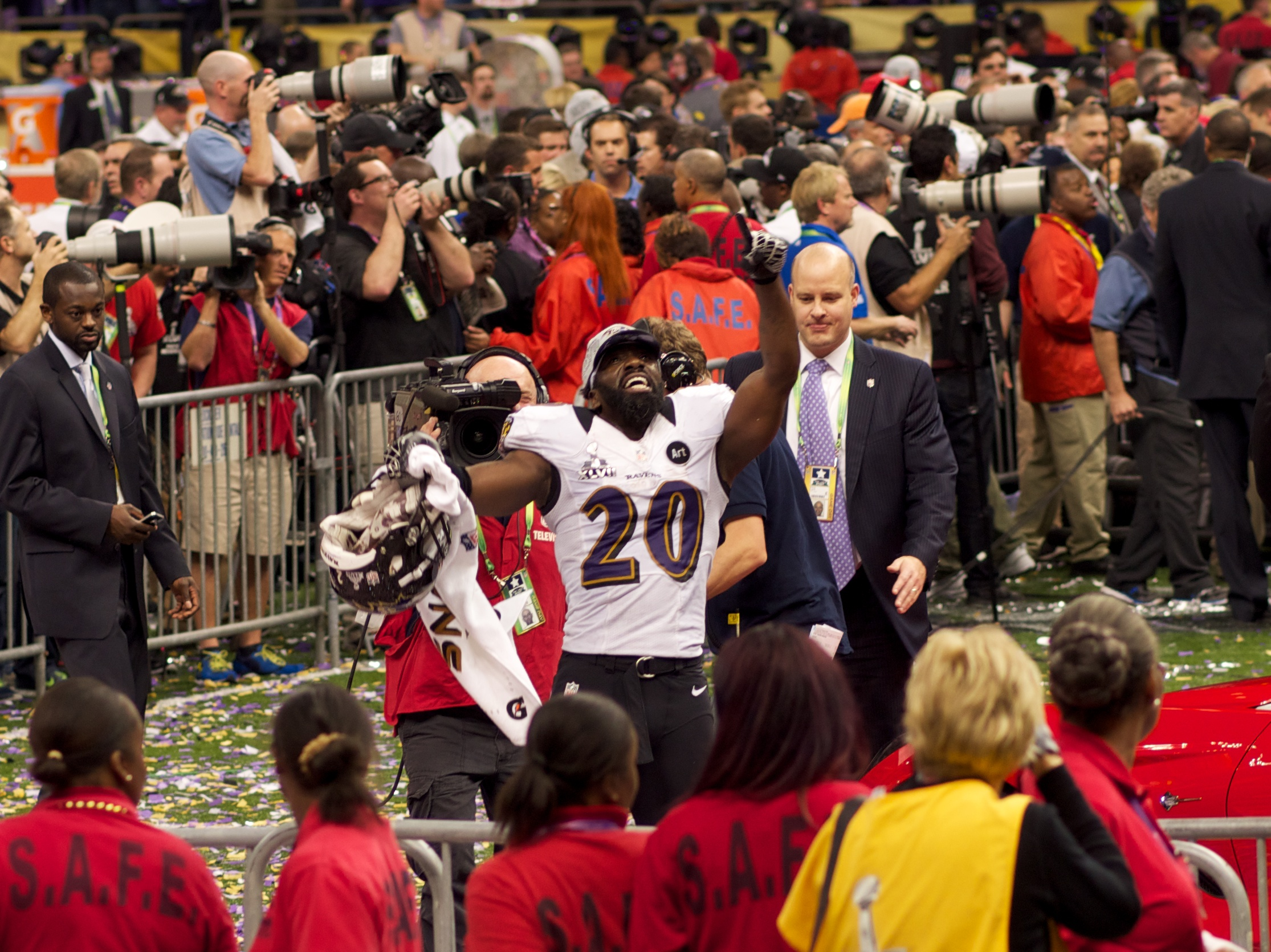
Ed Reed celebrates following victory.

On the Ravens' ensuing drive, Boldin caught two passes for 22 yards and Rice rushed for 11 yards as the team moved the ball 55 yards and scored on Tucker's 38-yard field goal, increasing their lead to 34–29 with 4:19 left in the game. The 49ers used up their second timeout on their next drive, but managed to set up 1st-and-goal on the Ravens' 7-yard line following a 24-yard catch by Crabtree and a 33-yard run by Gore.

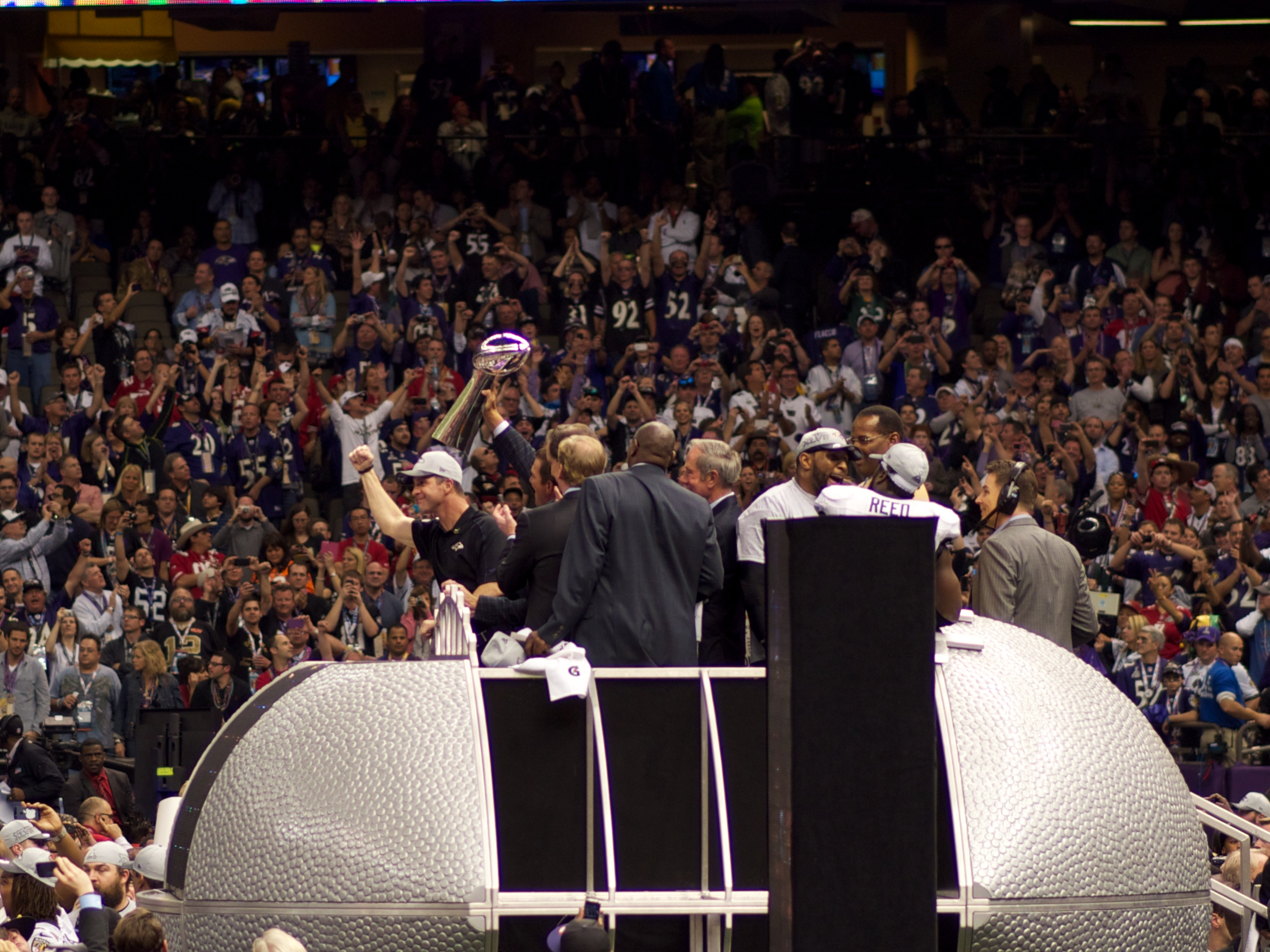
Lombardi trophy presentation.

With four chances to take the lead, the 49ers started out with a 2-yard run by James to the 5-yard line. After the two-minute warning, Kaepernick threw two incompletions, bringing up fourth down. What followed was one of the more controversial plays of the game. On their last chance, Kaepernick tried to throw the ball to Crabtree in the end zone, but a rush by linebacker Dannell Ellerbe caused Kaepernick to throw the ball high over Crabtree's head and the pass fell incomplete. Cornerback Jimmy Smith made contact with Crabtree in the end zone prior to the ball arriving, but no penalty was called and the 49ers turned the ball over on downs with 1:46 left in the game.

The 49ers managed to force a three-and-out on the Ravens' next drive, but as the 49ers only had one timeout remaining, the Ravens were able to run the clock down to 12 seconds. On fourth down, and after the Ravens called a timeout of their own, Koch fielded the snap in his own end zone. In an effort to kill as much of the 12 remaining seconds on the clock, Koch was instructed not to punt the ball but rather hang on to it and scramble around in the end zone for as long as he could. Koch was able to scramble for eight seconds before he was chased out of the side of the end zone by Culliver for an intentional safety, cutting the lead to 34–31 with just four seconds remaining and giving the 49ers one more chance for a game-winning play. On the ensuing free kick, Ginn returned the ball 31 yards, but was tackled at midfield by linebacker Josh Bynes as time expired.

=== Power outage ===
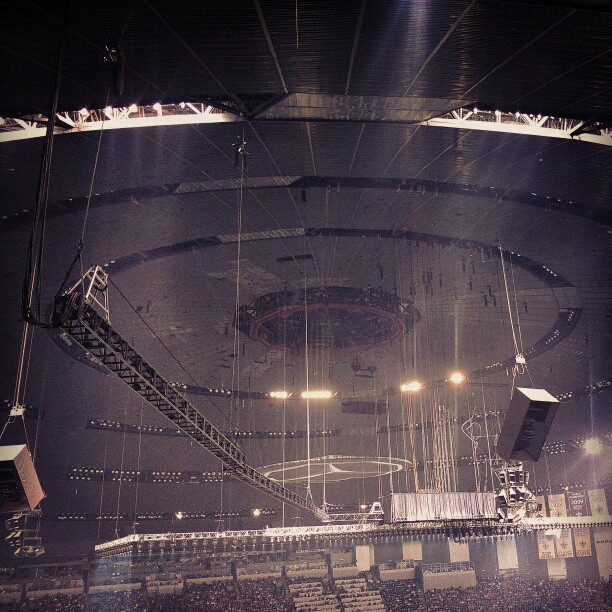
Emergency lights provided some illumination during the power outage.

Play was interrupted for 34 minutes because of a 22-minute partial power outage. The power failed with 13:22 remaining in the third quarter with the Ravens leading 28–6. Emergency generators provided backup lighting. The New Orleans Fire Department rescued people from elevator seven, but other elevators were brought to the ground uneventfully. Attendees used double the usual amount of data for their cell phones. AT&T reported 78 gigabytes (GB) downloaded from 8 to 9 PM, about double from the peak the year before. NFL chief security officer Jeffrey Miller attributed fans' calmness to their preoccupation with their electronics.

SMG, the Superdome's management company, had recently upgraded electrical systems at the facility. In an October 15, 2012, memo, Louisiana officials expressed concern that the equipment bringing electricity into the stadium from utility company Entergy had a "chance of failure". Authorities subsequently spent nearly $1 million on upgrades to the stadium, more than half of that paid to Allstar Electric to upgrade electrical feeder cables.

Entergy and SMG both said the problem was in interconnection equipment, and SMG hired a third party to investigate. Investigations homed in on a newly installed switchgear. Entergy installed a pair of relays made by Rogers Park's S&C Electric Company of Rogers Park, Chicago to ensure continued power supply in case one supply line failed. One of those relays tripped. Subsequent tests showed one of the relays functioned properly and the other did not. S&C Electric Co. claims the relay's trip setting was too low, but Entergy claims that the two were set identically.

Electricity usage during the game was on par with a regular New Orleans Saints game. The halftime show was powered by a generator that did not impact the stadium's power.

CBS viewers were shown the half-lit Superdome interior. The main broadcast booth was off line; sideline reporter Steve Tasker informed the audience that "a click of the lights" had occurred and play had been halted. Ray Lewis later stated in an interview that he believed the blackout was part of a conspiracy, saying: "You're a zillion-dollar company and your lights go out? No. No way." 49ers CEO Jed York responded to the claim on Twitter in jest, tweeting: "There is no conspiracy. I pulled the plug."

=== Box score ===
Super Bowl XLVII: Baltimore Ravens 34, San Francisco 49ers 31

Quarter	1	2	3	4	Total
Ravens (AFC)	7	14	7	6	34
49ers (NFC)	3	3	17	8	31

at Mercedes-Benz Superdome in New Orleans, Louisiana

- Date: February 3, 2013
- Game time: 5:31 p.m. CST
- Game weather: Played indoors (dome stadium)
- Game attendance: 71,024
- Referee: Jerome Boger
- TV announcers (CBS): Jim Nantz, Phil Simms, Steve Tasker, Solomon Wilcots
- Gamebook

Scoring summary

Quarter	Time	Drive			Team	Scoring information	Score	
Quarter	Time	Plays	Yards	TOP	Team	Scoring information	BAL	SF
1	10:36	6	51	2:29	BAL	Anquan Boldin 13-yard touchdown reception from Joe Flacco, Justin Tucker kick good	7	0
1	3:58	12	62	6:38	SF	36-yard field goal by David Akers	7	3
2	7:10	10	75	4:43	BAL	Dennis Pitta 1-yard touchdown reception from Flacco, Tucker kick good	14	3
2	1:45	3	56	0:22	BAL	Jacoby Jones 56-yard touchdown reception from Flacco, Tucker kick good	21	3
2	0:00	8	71	1:45	SF	27-yard field goal by Akers	21	6
3	14:49	—	—	—	BAL	J. Jones 108-yard kickoff return for a touchdown, Tucker kick good	28	6
3	7:20	7	80	3:06	SF	Michael Crabtree 31-yard touchdown reception from Colin Kaepernick, Akers kick good	28	13
3	4:59	2	20	0:48	SF	Frank Gore 6-yard touchdown run, Akers kick good	28	20
3	3:10	4	8	1:00	SF	34-yard field goal by Akers	28	23
4	12:54	12	71	5:16	BAL	19-yard field goal by Tucker	31	23
4	9:57	5	76	2:57	SF	Kaepernick 15-yard touchdown run, 2-point pass failed	31	29
4	4:19	10	59	5:38	BAL	38-yard field goal by Tucker	34	29
4	0:04	—	—	—	SF	Sam Koch −8-yard run, out of own end zone for a safety	34	31
"TOP" = time of possession. For other American football terms, see Glossary of American football.							34	31

=== Statistical overview ===
The teams combined for a Super Bowl–record 312 kickoff return yards. The Ravens scored the same number of points (34) in both of their Super Bowl appearances. Meanwhile, the 49ers became just the second team to lose the Super Bowl while scoring more than 30 points, joining the Dallas Cowboys in Super Bowl XIII; the New England Patriots would join this list in Super Bowl LII, and so would the Philadelphia Eagles in Super Bowl LVII. This was the third Super Bowl where both teams scored in every quarter, after Super Bowl XXIX and Super Bowl XXXII.

For the Ravens, Anquan Boldin was the leading receiver with 6 receptions for 106 yards and a touchdown. Paul Kruger had three tackles and two sacks, while Ed Reed had five tackles and an interception. Reed's interception gave him 9 career postseason picks, tying the NFL record. Dannell Ellerbe had nine tackles, while Ray Lewis had seven tackles in the final game of his 17-season career.

Baltimore's Jacoby Jones returned 5 kickoffs for 208 yards and a touchdown, two punts for 28 yards, and caught a 56-yard touchdown pass. He tied an NFL league record and set a Super Bowl record for longest kickoff return in a Super Bowl with a 108-yard return to open up the second half. Jones also set or tied the following records: the record for most combined yards in a Super Bowl game with 290, tied the record for most touchdown plays of 50 yards or more, with 2 and became the first player to score a receiving touchdown and return touchdown in a Super Bowl.

For San Francisco, Colin Kaepernick completed 16 of 28 passes for 302 yards and a touchdown, while also rushing for 62 yards and another score, but had 1 interception. His 62 rushing yards were the second highest total by a quarterback in the Super Bowl, behind Tennessee Titans quarterback Steve McNair's record of 64 in Super Bowl XXXIV. Kaepernick also set a Super Bowl record for the longest rushing touchdown from a quarterback for his 15-yard touchdown run in the fourth quarter. This beat the previous 6-yard record held by the 49ers' Joe Montana achieved in Super Bowl XIX.

Frank Gore rushed for 110 yards and a touchdown. Michael Crabtree caught 5 passes for 109 yards and a touchdown, while Davis caught 6 passes for 104 yards. His 104 receiving yards tied Dan Ross's record for the most ever by a tight end in a Super Bowl. Patrick Willis was the top tackler of the game with 10, while Brooks had five tackles and a sack.

Because of the power outage in the third quarter, the game set a Super Bowl record long running time of 4 hours and 14 minutes. During the presentation of the Vince Lombardi Trophy, Hall of Fame defensive end Richard Dent brought the trophy to the stage. Twitter announced that a record 24.1 million tweets were sent the night of the game.

== Final statistics ==
Sources: NFL.com Super Bowl XLVII, The Football Database Super Bowl XLVII

=== Statistical comparison ===
	Baltimore Ravens	San Francisco 49ers
First downs	21	23
First downs rushing	6	9
First downs passing	13	13
First downs penalty	2	1
Third down efficiency	9/16	2/9
Fourth down efficiency	0/2	0/1
Net yards rushing	93	182
Rushing attempts	35	29
Yards per rush	2.7	6.3
Passing – Completions-attempts	22/33	16/28
Times sacked-total yards	2–13	3–16
Interceptions thrown	0	1
Net yards passing	274	286
Total net yards	367	468
Punt returns-total yards	2–28	1–32
Kickoff returns-total yards	5–206	4–106
Interceptions-total return yards	1–6	0–0
Punts-average yardage	3–47.0	3–53.0
Fumbles-lost	2–1	1–1
Penalties-yards	2–20	5–33
Time of possession	32:23	27:37
Turnovers	1	2

Records set
Most Combined Yards, Game	290 yards	Jacoby Jones, Baltimore
Longest Play	108 yard kick return	Jacoby Jones, Baltimore
Longest Kick Return	108 yards	Jacoby Jones, Baltimore
Longest Kick Return for TD	108 yards	Jacoby Jones, Baltimore
Longest TD Run, Quarterback	15 yards	Colin Kaepernick, San Francisco
Most Kickoff-Return Yards, Both Teams	312 yards	Baltimore 206, San Francisco 106
Longest Time Of Game	4:14	
Records tied
Most TDs, Plays of 50-or-More Yards, Game	2	Jacoby Jones, Baltimore
Most TDs, Kickoff Returns, Game	1	Jacoby Jones, Baltimore
Most Safeties, Game	1	Chris Culliver, San Francisco
Most TDs, Kickoff Returns, Game, Team	1	Baltimore
Most Safeties, Game, Team	1	San Francisco
Most Players, 100-or-More Receiving; Yards, Game, Team	2	San Francisco (Michael Crabtree 109, Vernon Davis 104)
Most Points, Third Quarter, Both Teams	24	San Francisco 17, Baltimore 7
Most Field Goals, Game, Both Teams	5	San Francisco 3, Baltimore 2
Most Field Goals Without Miss, Game, Both Teams	5	San Francisco 3, Baltimore 2
Fewest Rushing Touchdowns, Game, Team	0	Baltimore

=== Individual leaders ===
Ravens passing
	C/ATT^{1}	Yds	TD	INT	Rating
Joe Flacco	22/33	287	3	0	124.2
Ravens rushing
	Car^{2}	Yds	TD	LG^{3}	Yds/Car
Ray Rice	20	59	0	12	2.95
Bernard Pierce	12	33	0	8	2.75
Justin Tucker	1	8	0	8	8.00
Vonta Leach	1	1	0	1	1.00
Sam Koch	1	–8	0	–8	–8.00
Ravens receiving
	Rec^{4}	Yds	TD	LG^{3}	Target^{5}
Anquan Boldin	6	104	1	30	10
Dennis Pitta	4	26	1	9	5
Ray Rice	4	19	0	7	4
Vonta Leach	3	10	0	8	3
Ed Dickson	2	37	0	23	2
Torrey Smith	2	35	0	20	6
Jacoby Jones	1	56	1	56	2

49ers passing
	C/ATT^{1}	Yds	TD	INT	Rating
Colin Kaepernick	16/28	302	1	1	91.7
49ers rushing
	Car^{2}	Yds	TD	LG^{3}	Yds/Car
Frank Gore	19	110	1	33	5.79
Colin Kaepernick	7	62	1	15	8.86
LaMichael James	3	10	0	9	3.33
49ers receiving
	Rec^{4}	Yds	TD	LG^{3}	Target^{5}
Vernon Davis	6	104	0	29	8
Michael Crabtree	5	109	1	31	10
Delanie Walker	3	48	0	28	4
Randy Moss	2	41	0	32	5
Ted Ginn Jr.	0	0	0	0	1

^{1}Completions/attempts ^{2}Carries ^{3}Long gain ^{4}Receptions ^{5}Times targeted

== Starting lineups ==
Hall of Fame‡

Baltimore	Position	Position	San Francisco
Offense
Torrey Smith	WR		Michael Crabtree
Bryant McKinnie	LT		Joe Staley
Kelechi Osemele	LG		Mike Iupati
Matt Birk	C		Jonathan Goodwin
Marshal Yanda	RG		Alex Boone
Michael Oher	RT		Anthony Davis
Anquan Boldin	WR	TE	Vernon Davis
Jacoby Jones	WR		Randy Moss‡
Joe Flacco	QB		Colin Kaepernick
Vonta Leach	FB	TE	Delanie Walker
Ray Rice	RB		Frank Gore
Defense
Arthur Jones	DE		Ray McDonald
Ma'ake Kemoeatu	NT		Isaac Sopoaga
Haloti Ngata	DT		Justin Smith
Courtney Upshaw	LOLB		Ahmad Brooks
Dannell Ellerbe	ILB		NaVorro Bowman
Ray Lewis‡	ILB		Patrick Willis‡
Terrell Suggs	ROLB		Aldon Smith
Corey Graham	LCB		Carlos Rogers
Cary Williams	RCB		Tarell Brown
Ed Reed‡	FS		Dashon Goldson
Bernard Pollard	SS		Donte Whitner

== Officials ==
- Referee – Jerome Boger (#23), only Super Bowl
- Umpire – Darrell Jenkins (#76), only Super Bowl
- Head linesman – Steve Stelljes (#22), only Super Bowl
- Line judge – Byron Boston (#18), second of three Super Bowls (XXXIV, LII)
- Field judge – Craig Wrolstad (#4), only Super Bowl
- Side judge – Joe Larrew (#73), only Super Bowl
- Back judge – Dino Paganelli (#105), first of two Super Bowls (LV)
- Replay official - Bill Spyksma
- Replay assistant - Terry Sullivan
- Alternate referee – Bill Vinovich (#52), referee of Super Bowls XLIX, LIV, LVIII
- Alternate umpire – Bruce Stritesky (#102)
- Alternate flank – Tom Stephan (#68)
- Alternate deep – Scott Edwards (#3), side judge for Super Bowls 50, LII
- Alternate back judge – Steve Freeman (#133), back judge for Super Bowl XLVIII

Officials wore the full-length black pants, introduced for cold weather in 2006, for the first time in a Super Bowl. The black pants were made mandatory during the 2012 season. The previous six Super Bowls were played either in Florida or a retractable-roof stadium with the roof closed, warm enough for officials to wear the traditional white knickers.
