= Sportitalia 24 =

- Country: Italy

Programming
- Picture format: 4:3 SDTV

Ownership
- Owner: LT Multimedia
- Sister channels: Sportitalia; Sportitalia 2

History
- Launched: 10 June 2010
- Closed: 1 November 2013

Links
- Website: sportitalia.com

Availability

Terrestrial
- Digital: DVB-T, LCN 62, Where available

Streaming media
- Sportitalia.com: Live Streaming

Sportitalia 24 was an Italian sports channel, the third owned by LT Multimedia after Sportitalia.

It was broadcast FTA on DTT in Italy channel 62 on Mux Tivuitalia, a company of Screen Service group and on Mux TIMB 2, a company of Telecom Italia Media group. It is also available on SKY Italia and on IPTV.

It was launched as sports-news channel on 10 June 2010.
