= Soleri =

Soleri is an Italian surname. Notable people with the surname include:

- Edoardo Soleri (born 1997), Italian footballer
- Giuseppe Soleri (born 1982), Italian television actor
- Marcello Soleri (1882–1945), Italian politician
- Paolo Soleri (1919–2013), Italian architect
