= Inspector Coliandro =

Italian television series

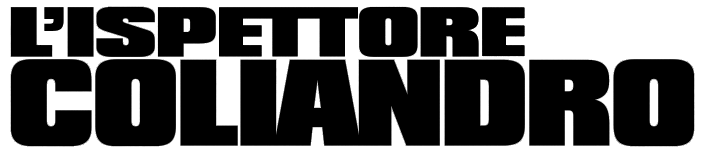
- Original logo
- Italian: L'ispettore Coliandro
- Genre: Police procedural; Noir comedy
- Created by: Carlo Lucarelli
- Starring: Giampaolo Morelli; Veronica Logan; Alessandro Rossi; Paolo Sassanelli; Giuseppe Soleri; Benedetta Cimatti
- Opening theme: "Coliandro"
- Country of origin: Italy
- No. of seasons: 8
- No. of episodes: 34

Production
- Production location: Bologna
- Running time: 90–110 minutes (per episode)
- Production company: Rai Fiction

Original release
- Network: RAI 2
- Release: August 24, 2006 – October 13, 2021

Inspector Coliandro (Italian: L'ispettore Coliandro) is an Italian television series aired on Rai 2 since 2006, starring Giampaolo Morelli, directed by Marco Manetti and Antonio Manetti (collectively referred to as Manetti Bros.). The series is a black comedy crime thriller, based on the novels of crime writer Carlo Lucarelli. The series' visual style and plot contain many quotes from popular crime and action movies of the 70s and 80s.

== Plot ==
Coliandro is a young detective that works in Bologna. His peculiar ability of being, at the same time, brave, reckless and particularly non-observant puts him in many dangerous situations.

In most of the episodes Coliandro tries to investigate cases that his more skilled colleagues cannot solve and somehow he unintentionally gets involved in. This results in him being punished, taken off field work and assigned to “boring” desk jobs such as issuing passports. During his unauthorized investigations he is often helped by two of his colleagues, Trombetti and Gargiulo, whereas his superiors dismiss his efforts and consider him a joke and a nuisance.

Coliandro is ignorant, crude, and despised by all his colleagues except his partner Gargiulo, who is the only one seeing him the way he sees himself: a real-life version of Inspector Callahan. He often quotes from these and other American action and crime movies and tries to imitate the behavior of his idols.

In every case Coliandro is helped by a girl (a victim or a witness) and he always hopelessly falls in love with her but he is, inexorably, dumped at the end of every case. Coliandro seems to be able to close every case with a combination of stubbornness and luck but at the end is always punished due to his “unprofessional behavior”.

The humor of the series is manifest in the difference between the way Coliandro sees himself and the way the rest of the world sees him. Coliandro's very name is a play on the Italian word coglione – a word literally meaning "balls", but most usually used with the meaning of "asshole." Others who meet him for the first time also often mispronounce his name in various ways making it "coriandolo" (which means "coriander", or even "confetti"). At any rate, he must continually correct its pronunciation.

One notable characteristic of the "Coliandro" series is that all episodes are shot in the city of Bologna or its immediate surroundings, a wealthy town which is not really known for crime.

== Production ==
The series has hitherto consisted of eight seasons: season 1 to 3 have four episodes each, the fourth has 2, fifth and sixth have 6, seventh and eighth have 4. The first season was aired in 2006, the second and third in 2009, the fourth in 2010, seasons 5–7 in 2016–2018, season 8 in 2021. Giampaolo Morelli plays the main character (Coliandro), whilst Alessandro Rossi (commissioner De Zan), Veronica Logan (prosecutor Longhi), Paolo Sassanelli (Inspector Gamberini) and Giuseppe Soleri (Agent, and then Inspector, Gargiulo) are the main regulars of the series.
