= List of Italian films of 2010 =

A list of films released in Italy in 2010 (see 2010 in film).

Title	Director	Cast	Genre	Notes
2010
18 Years Later	Edoardo Leo	Edoardo Leo, Marco Bonini, Sabrina Impacciatore	Comedy-drama	
20 Cigarettes	Aureliano Amadei	Vinicio Marchioni, Carolina Crescentini	Drama	
Angel of Evil	Michele Placido	Kim Rossi Stuart, Michele Placido, Filippo Timi, Paz Vega	Crime	
Basilicata Coast to Coast	Rocco Papaleo	Rocco Papaleo, Alessandro Gassman, Giovanna Mezzogiorno	Comedy	
Benvenuti al Sud	Luca Miniero	Claudio Bisio, Alessandro Siani, Angela Finocchiaro, Valentina Lodovini	Comedy	
Certified Copy	Abbas Kiarostami	Juliette Binoche, William Shimell	Drama	French-Italian-Belgian co-production
Come Undone	Silvio Soldini	Alba Rohrwacher, Pierfrancesco Favino,	Drama	Berlin Film Festival
Dark Love	Antonio Capuano	Luisa Ranieri, Valeria Golino, Fabrizio Gifuni	Drama	
Die	Dominic James	Elias Koteas, Emily Hampshire, Caterina Murino	Thriller	Canadian-Italian co-production
Draquila – L'Italia che trema	Sabina Guzzanti	Sabina Guzzanti	Documentary	Entered the 2010 Cannes Film Festival
The End Is My Beginning	Jo Baier	Bruno Ganz, Elio Germano	Drama	
Exit: una storia personale	Massimiliano Amato	Luca Guastini	Drama	
The Father and the Foreigner	Ricky Tognazzi	Alessandro Gassman, Amr Waked	Drama	
The First Assignment	Giorgia Cecere	Isabella Ragonese	Drama	
The First Beautiful Thing	Paolo Virzì	Valerio Mastandrea, Micaela Ramazzotti, Stefania Sandrelli, Claudia Pandolfi	Drama	Italian entry for the Best Foreign Language Film at the 83rd Academy Awards
From the Waist Up	Gianfrancesco Lazotti	Cristiana Capotondi, Filippo Nigro, Nicoletta Romanoff	Drama	
Gorbaciof	Stefano Incerti	Toni Servillo, Yang Mi	Drama	
Happy Family	Gabriele Salvatores	Margherita Buy, Diego Abatantuono, Fabrizio Bentivoglio	Comedy	
Hayfever	Laura Luchetti	Andrea Bosca, Diane Fleri, Giulia Michelini	Romance	
I Am Love	Luca Guadagnino	Tilda Swinton, Marisa Berenson	Drama	Music By John Adams
Into Paradiso	Paola Randi	Gianfelice Imparato, Peppe Servillo	Comedy	Entered into the 67th Venice International Film Festival
Kiss Me Again	Gabriele Muccino	Stefano Accorsi, Pierfrancesco Favino	Romance	Sequel of The Last Kiss
Loose Cannons	Ferzan Özpetek	Riccardo Scamarcio, Alessandro Preziosi, Carolina Crescentini, Nicole Grimaudo	Comedy	Entered the 60th Berlin International Film Festival
Lost Kisses	Roberta Torre	Donatella Finocchiaro, Carla Marchese, Piera Degli Esposti	Comedy-drama	Entered into the 68th Venice International Film Festival
Love & Slaps	Sergio Castellitto	Sergio Castellitto, Laura Morante, Enzo Jannacci, Marco Giallini	Comedy	
Marriage and Other Disasters	Nina Di Majo	Margherita Buy, Fabio Volo, Francesca Inaudi	Comedy	
Martino's Summer	Massimo Natale	Treat Williams, Luigi Ciardo	Drama	
Men vs. Women	Fausto Brizzi	Paola Cortellesi, Fabio De Luigi, Sarah Felberbaum, Claudio Bisio	Comedy	
Me, Them and Lara	Carlo Verdone	Carlo Verdone, Laura Chiatti, Anna Bonaiuto, Marco Giallini	Comedy	
The Mouth of the Wolf	Pietro Marcello	Mary Monaco	Documentary	Teddy Award winner
News from the Excavations	Emidio Greco	Giuseppe Battiston, Ambra Angiolini, Iaia Forte	Drama	
La nostra vita	Daniele Luchetti	Elio Germano, Isabella Ragonese, Raoul Bova	Drama	In competition at the 2010 Cannes Film Festival
Parents and Children: Shake Well Before Using	Giovanni Veronesi	Silvio Orlando, Luciana Littizzetto, Michele Placido, Margherita Buy	Comedy	
Passione	John Turturro	John Turturro, Fiorello, Massimo Ranieri, Lina Sastri	Documentary	Entered into the 67th Venice International Film Festival
La passione	Carlo Mazzacurati	Silvio Orlando, Cristiana Capotondi, Stefania Sandrelli, Kasia Smutniak	Comedy-drama	Entered into the 67th Venice International Film Festival
La pecora nera	Ascanio Celestini	Maya Sansa, Giorgio Tirabassi, Ascanio Celestini	Comedy	Entered into the 67th Venice International Film Festival
Le Quattro Volte	Michelangelo Frammartino	Giuseppe Fuda	Drama	
A Quiet Life	Claudio Cupellini	Toni Servillo, Juliane Köhler	Neo-noir	
The Santa Claus Gang	Paolo Genovese	Aldo, Giovanni & Giacomo, Angela Finocchiaro	Comedy	
School Is Over	Valerio Jalongo	Valeria Golino, Vincenzo Amato, Antonella Ponziani	Drama	
A Second Childhood	Pupi Avati	Fabrizio Bentivoglio, Francesca Neri, Lino Capolicchio, Serena Grandi	Drama	
The Solitude of Prime Numbers	Saverio Costanzo	Alba Rohrwacher, Luca Marinelli, Isabella Rossellini	Drama	Entered into the 67th Venice International Film Festival
Sorry If I Want to Marry You	Federico Moccia	Raoul Bova, Michela Quattrociocche, Cecilia Dazzi	Romantic comedy	
Sul mare	Alessandro D'Alatri	Martina Codecasa, Vincenzo Merolla	Romance	
Ti presento un amico	Carlo Vanzina	Raoul Bova, Martina Stella, Barbora Bobuľová	Romantic comedy	
The Trick in the Sheet	Alfonso Arau	Maria Grazia Cucinotta, Geraldine Chaplin, Anne Parillaud	Comedy	
Ubaldo Terzani Horror Show	Gabriele Albanesi	Paolo Sassanelli, Giuseppe Soleri	Horror	
Unlikely Revolutionaries	Lucio Pellegrini	Pierfrancesco Favino, Giuseppe Battiston, Fabio Volo, Claudia Pandolfi	Comedy	
The Youngest Son	Pupi Avati	Christian De Sica, Luca Zingaretti, Laura Morante	Comedy-drama	
We Believed	Mario Martone	Luigi Lo Cascio, Valerio Binasco, Toni Servillo, Luca Zingaretti	Drama	Entered into the 67th Venice International Film Festival
The Woman of My Dreams	Luca Lucini	Alessandro Gassman, Luca Argentero, Valentina Lodovini	Comedy	

== See also ==
- 2010 in Italian television
