= The First Assignment =

- Directed by: Giorgia Cecere
- Written by: Giorgia Cecere; Yang Li Xiang; Pierpaolo Pirone
- Produced by: Donatella Botti
- Starring: Isabella Ragonese
- Cinematography: Gianni Troilo
- Music by: Donatello Pisanello
- Release date: 2010
- Running time: 90 minutes
- Country: Italy
- Language: Italian

The First Assignment (Italian: Il primo incarico) is a 2010 Italian drama film directed by Giorgia Cecere. It entered into the "Controcampo Italiano" section at the 67th Venice International Film Festival.

== Cast ==
- Isabella Ragonese as Nena
- Francesco Chiarello as Giovanni
- Alberto Boll as Francesco
- Miriana Protopapa as Nena's sister

== See also ==
- List of Italian films of 2010
