= Floor 17 =

2005 Italian thriller film

- Directed by: Manetti Bros.
- Screenplay by: Manetti Bros. Giampaolo Morelli
- Starring: Giampaolo Morelli; Elisabetta Rocchetti; Enrico Silvestrin; Giuseppe Soleri; Antonino Iuorio
- Cinematography: Fabio Amadei
- Music by: Pivio and Aldo De Scalzi
- Release date: 2005
- Language: Italian

Floor 17 (Italian: Piano 17) is a 2005 Italian thriller film written and directed by Manetti Bros. and starring Giampaolo Morelli.

The film was nominated for Nastro d'Argento for best score and for David di Donatello for best visual effects.

== Cast ==
- Giampaolo Morelli as Marco Mancini
- Elisabetta Rocchetti as Violetta Grimaldi
- Giuseppe Soleri as Meroni
- Enrico Silvestrin as Luca Pittana
- Antonino Iuorio as Giovanni Borgia
- Massimo Ghini as Matteo Mancini
- Alessandro Borgese as Rodolfo
- Simone Colombari as Primigi
- Caterina Corsi as Giada
- Camilla Diana as Lisa Mancini
- Valerio Mastandrea as Street vendor
- Enzo G. Castellari as Vigilant
