= Ubaldo Terzani Horror Show =

- Directed by: Gabriele Albanesi
- Written by: Gabriele Albanesi
- Starring: Paolo Sassanelli
- Cinematography: Francesco Collinelli
- Music by: Valerio Lundini
- Distributed by: Minerva Pictures
- Release date: November 2010 (Buenos Aires Rojo Sangre)
- Running time: 83 minutes
- Country: Italy
- Language: Italian

Ubaldo Terzani Horror Show is a 2010 horror film written and directed by Gabriele Albanesi and starring Paolo Sassanelli and Giuseppe Soleri.

== Cast ==
- Paolo Sassanelli as Ubaldo Terzani
- Giuseppe Soleri as Alessio Rinaldi
- Laura Gigante as Sara
- Antonino Iuorio as Tommaso Curreri
- Ripli Zsuzsanna as Erika
- Francesco Mastrorilli as Giulio
- Stefano Fregni as Guido Orsello
- Vera Dragone as Ninetta
- Massimo Triggiani as Luca Paoletti

== See also ==
- List of Italian films of 2010
