= 2010 in Italian television =

This is a list of Italian television related events from 2010.

== Events ==
- 8 March – Mauro Marin wins the tenth season of Grande Fratello.
- 20 March – Actress and TV personality Veronica Olivier and her partner Raimondo Todaro win the sixth season of Ballando con le stelle.
- 17 May – 39-year-old opera singer Carmen Masola wins the first season of Italia's Got Talent.
- 23 November – Nathalie Giannitrapani wins the fourth season of X Factor, becoming the show's first female winner.

== Debuts ==
=== Domestic ===
- 12 April – Italia's Got Talent (2010–present)

=== International ===
- 17 May – (Australia) / (France) Sally Bollywood: Super Detective (Toon Disney) (2009–2013)

== Television shows ==
=== RAI ===
==== Drama ====
- Once upon a time the city of fools, biopic by Marco Turco, with Fabrizio Gifuni as Franco Basaglia; 2 episodes.
- Le ragazze dello swing ("Swing girls") – biopic by Maurizio Zaccaro, with Andrea Osvárt, Lotte Verbeek and Elise Schaap as the Trio Lescano; 2 episodes.
- Il grande teatro di Eduardo ("Eduardo's great theatre") – directed and interpreted by Massimo Ranieri, cycle of 4 De Filippo's plays: Filumena Marturano (with Mariangela Melato), Napoli milionaria (with Barbara De Rossi), Questi fantasmi (with Donatella Finocchiaro) and Sabato, domenica e lunedì (with Monica Guerritore). Unusually, the pieces are played in Italian and not in the origina Naples dialect.
- Restless Heart: The Confessions of Saint Augustine – by Christian Duguay, with Alessandro Preziosi and Franco Nero in the title role and Monica Guerritore as Saint Monica; 2 episodes.

==== Music ====
- Rigoletto a Mantova – by Marco Bellocchio, with Plácido Domingo and Ruggero Raimondi; the Verdi's opera is broadcast live from the real places of the story; third and last chapter of the series La via della musica (The music way). The show is seen in Worldview in 148 countries.

==== News and educational ====
- La banda della Magliana, la vera storia ("Banda della Magliana, the true story"), documentary by Andrea Doretti and Tommaso Vecchio; 4 episodes.

=== 2000s ===
- Grande Fratello (2000–present)
- Ballando con le stelle (2005–present)
- X Factor (2008–present)

== Networks and services ==
=== Launches ===
Network	Type	Launch date	Notes	Source
MTV Plus	Cable and satellite	17 May		
Sportitalia 24	Cable and satellite	10 June		
Frisbee	Cable and satellite	12 June		
DeA Super	Cable and satellite	1 September		
TG Norba 24	Cable and satellite	25 October		

== Deaths ==
Date	Name	Age	Cinematic Credibility
15 April	Raimondo Vianello	87	Italian film actor, comedian & TV host

== See also ==
- List of Italian films of 2010
