= Alessandro Rossi (actor) =

Italian voice actor

- Born: Ruggero Alessandro Rossi; 12 October 1955 (age 70); Rome, Italy
- Occupations: Actor; voice actor; dialogue writer; dubbing director
- Years active: 1976–present

Ruggero Alessandro Rossi (born 12 October 1955) is an Italian actor and voice actor.

== Biography ==
Rossi was born in Rome and began his career on stage in 1976 when he spent four years as a member of Teatro Il Politecnico. He subsequently worked in other theatre companies across Italy. As an actor on screen, he played the role of Commissioner De Zan in the television series Inspector Coliandro, which began in 2006 and ended in 2021. Rossi is known to the Italian public as a voice actor. He is the Italian voice dubber of Liam Neeson and Arnold Schwarzenegger. He also provided the Italian voice of Samuel L. Jackson, Ving Rhames, Michael Clarke Duncan and Patrick Stewart in some of their works.

Some of Rossi's notable film dubbing roles include Optimus Prime (performed by Peter Cullen) in the Transformers film franchise, Alex Murphy (performed by Peter Weller and Robert John Burke) in the RoboCop film franchise and Biff Tannen (performed by Thomas F. Wilson) in the Back to the Future film franchise. He also dubbed Jean-Luc Picard (performed by Patrick Stewart) in Star Trek: The Next Generation. In Rossi's animated roles, he has dubbed Goliath in Gargoyles, Zapp Brannigan in Futurama and Speed in The Swan Princess.

== Filmography ==
Year	Title	Role	Notes
2006–2021	Inspector Coliandro	Commissioner De Zan	TV series, recurring role
2015	Provaci ancora prof!	Dario Scalzi	TV series, 1 episode
2017	Suburra: Blood on Rome	Giacomo Finucci	TV series, Recurring role (season 1)
2018	È arrivata la felicità		TV series, 1 episode
2019	Oltre la soglia		TV series, 1 episode
2019	Leo da Vinci	Red Pirate (voice)	Animated TV series

=== Dubbing ===
==== Films (Animation, Italian dub) ====
Year	Title	Role(s)	Ref
1988	Who Framed Roger Rabbit	Bongo the Gorilla	
1994	The Swan Princess	Speed	
1995	The Pebble and the Penguin	Drake	
1996	Heavy Metal	Den	
1996	All Dogs Go to Heaven 2	Carface Caruthers	
1997	The Swan Princess: Escape from Castle Mountain	Speed	
1998	The Swan Princess III: The Mystery of the Enchanted Treasure	Speed	
1998	Spriggan	Narrator	
1998	Tekken: The Motion Picture	Jack-2	
1999	Bartok the Magnificent	Zozi	
2001	Atlantis: The Lost Empire	Dr. Joshua Sweet	
2001	Final Fantasy: The Spirits Within	Ryan Whittaker	
2001	Metropolis	Pero	
2001	Christmas Carol: The Movie	Ghost of Christmas Present	
2002	The Hunchback of Notre Dame II	Victor (singing voice)	
2002	The Country Bears	Fred Bedderhead	
2003	El Cid: The Legend	Diego Laínez	
2003	Atlantis: Milo's Return	Dr. Joshua Sweet	
2003	Brother Bear	Tug	
2003	Sinbad: Legend of the Seven Seas	Kale	
2003	Finding Nemo	Bruce	
2004	Ghost in the Shell 2: Innocence	Batou	
2004	Home on the Range	Junior	
2005	Tarzan II	Uto	
2006	Brother Bear 2	Tug	
2006	The Ant Bully	Wasp Leader	
2006	Cars	Sven the Governator	
2006	Open Season	Ian	
2006	Happy Feet	Leopard Seal	
2007	The Simpsons Movie	President Arnold Schwarzenegger	
2007	Ratatouille	Auguste Gusteau	
2007	Bee Movie	Ken	
2007	Enchanted	Troll	
2008	WALL-E	AUTO	
2008	Space Chimps	Titan	
2010	Shrek Forever After	Brogan	
2010	Alpha and Omega	Winston	
2011	Gnomeo & Juliet	Terrafirminator Announcer	
2011	Kung Fu Panda 2	Li Shan	
2012	The Pirates! In an Adventure with Scientists!	Pirate King	
2012	Wreck-It Ralph	General Hologram	
2012	Dino Time	Surly	
2012	Ghost in the Shell	Batou (2012 redub)	
2012	Hotel Transylvania	Pilot	
2013	Planes	Chug	
2013	Free Birds	Chief Broadbeak	
2013	Free Birds	Narrator	
2013	Turbo	Whiplash	
2014	Mr. Peabody & Sherman	Agamemnon	
2014	Planes: Fire & Rescue	Chug	
2014	Appleseed Alpha	Briareos	
2014	Kingsglaive: Final Fantasy XV	Clarus Amicitia	
2016	The Angry Birds Movie	Mighty Eagle	
2017	The Son of Bigfoot	Wilbur	
2017	Deep	Kraken	
2018	Isle of Dogs	Narrator	
2018	White Fang	Grey Beaver	
2018	Spider-Man: Into the Spider-Verse	Norman Osborn / Green Goblin	
2019	The Angry Birds Movie 2	Mighty Eagle	
2020	Trolls World Tour	Mr. Dinkles	
2022	Wendell & Wild	Buffalo Belzer	
2024	The Garfield Movie	Otto	

==== Films (Live action, Italian dub) ====
Year	Title	Role(s)	Original actor	Ref
1977	Pumping Iron	Lou Ferrigno	Lou Ferrigno	
1978	The Deer Hunter	Cab Driver	Dennis Watlington	
1983	Octopussy	Gobinda	Kabir Bedi	
1984	The Natural	Boone	Mike Starr	
1984	Once Upon a Time in America	Sergeant P. Halloran	Bruce Bahrenburg	
1985	Back to the Future	Biff Tannen	Thomas F. Wilson	
1985	Rocky IV	Ivan Drago	Dolph Lundgren	
1985	The Slugger's Wife	Moose Granger	Randy Quaid	
1985	American Flyers	Dr. Dennis Conrad	John Amos	
1986	Gung Ho	Buster	George Wendt	
1986	Lady Jane	Henry Grey, Duke of Suffolk	Patrick Stewart	
1986	Highlander	The Kurgan	Clancy Brown	
1986	Firewalker	El Coyote	Sonny Landham	
1986	Cobra	Night Slasher	Brian Thompson	
1986	Demons 2	Hank	Bobby Rhodes	
1987	Suspect	Carl Wayne Anderson	Liam Neeson	
1987	Gardens of Stone	Sergeant Flanagan	Laurence Fishburne	
1987	RoboCop	Alex Murphy / RoboCop	Peter Weller	
1987	The Living Daylights	Brad Whitaker	Joe Don Baker	
1987	Blind Date	Ted Davis	Phil Hartman	
1988	Punchline	John Krytsick	John Goodman	
1988	The Good Mother	Leo Cutter	Liam Neeson	
1988	Short Circuit 2	Jones	David Hemblen	
1988	School Daze	Vaughn "Dap" Dunlap	Laurence Fishburne	
1988	Twins	Julius Benedict	Arnold Schwarzenegger	
1988	Midnight Run	Jonathan "The Duke" Mardukas	Charles Grodin	
1988	Plain Clothes	Chet Butler	George Wendt	
1988	Moon over Parador	Roberto Strausmann	Raul Julia	
1988	Rambo III	Sam Trautman	Richard Crenna	
1988	A Nightmare on Elm Street 4: The Dream Master	Dennis Johnson	Nicholas Mele	
1988	Clean and Sober	Craig	Morgan Freeman	
1988	Who Framed Roger Rabbit	Angelo	Richard Ridings	
1989	Born on the Fourth of July	Man in Bar	Mike Starr	
1989	Back to the Future Part II	Biff Tannen	Thomas F. Wilson	
1989	Back to the Future Part II	Griff Tannen	Thomas F. Wilson	
1989	Sea of Love	Sherman Touhey	John Goodman	
1989	Always	Powerhouse	Keith David	
1989	Lock Up	Chink Weber	Sonny Landham	
1989	The Return of the Musketeers	Comte de Rochefort	Christopher Lee	
1989	Glory	Silas Trip	Denzel Washington	
1989	Next of Kin	Truman Gates	Patrick Swayze	
1989	We're No Angels	Bobby	James Russo	
1990	I Come in Peace	Jack Caine	Dolph Lundgren	
1990	Total Recall	Douglas Quaid	Arnold Schwarzenegger	
1990	Kindergarten Cop	John Kimble	Arnold Schwarzenegger	
1990	Stella	Ed Munn	John Goodman	
1990	Back to the Future Part III	Biff Tannen	Thomas F. Wilson	
1990	Back to the Future Part III	Buford "Mad Dog" Tannen	Thomas F. Wilson	
1990	Navy SEALs	William "Billy" Graham	Dennis Haysbert	
1990	RoboCop 2	Alex Murphy / RoboCop	Peter Weller	
1990	Quick Change	Loomis	Randy Quaid	
1990	Days of Thunder	Tim Daland	Randy Quaid	
1990	Presumed Innocent	Alejandro "Sandy" Stern	Raul Julia	
1990	The Hunt for Red October	Ronald Jones	Courtney B. Vance	
1990	Two Evil Eyes	Detective LeGrand	John Amos	
1990	Mo' Better Blues	Shadow Henderson	Wesley Snipes	
1990	Goodfellas	Anthony Stabile	Frank Adonis	
1990	Stanley & Iris	Joe Fuller	Jamey Sheridan	
1990	Arachnophobia	Dr. James Atherton	Julian Sands	
1991	Under Suspicion	Tony Aaron	Liam Neeson	
1991	Cover Up	Mike Anderson	Dolph Lundgren	
1991	Boyz n the Hood	Jason "Furious" Styles Jr.	Laurence Fishburne	
1991	Terminator 2: Judgment Day	Terminator	Arnold Schwarzenegger	
1991	Billy Bathgate	Jules "Big Julie" Martin	Mike Starr	
1991	Freddy's Dead: The Final Nightmare	Doc	Yaphet Kotto	
1991	Suburban Commando	Shep Ramsey	Hulk Hogan	
1991	Guilty by Suspicion	Bunny Baxter	George Wendt	
1991	My Girl	Phil Sultenfuss	Richard Masur	
1991	Cape Fear	Claude Kersek	Joe Don Baker	
1991	Body Chemistry II: The Voice of a Stranger	Big Chuck	Morton Downey Jr.	
1992	Leap of Faith	Sheriff Will Braverman	Liam Neeson	
1992	The Bodyguard	Tony Scipelli	Mike Starr	
1992	Malcolm X	West Indian Archie	Delroy Lindo	
1992	Universal Soldier	Andrew Scott / GR13	Dolph Lundgren	
1992	Love Field	Paul Cater	Dennis Haysbert	
1993	Dragon: The Bruce Lee Story	Bill Krieger	Robert Wagner	
1993	Last Action Hero	Jack Slater	Arnold Schwarzenegger	
1993	Last Action Hero	Arnold Schwarzenegger	Arnold Schwarzenegger	
1993	Last Action Hero	Hamlet	Arnold Schwarzenegger	
1993	Schindler's List	Oskar Schindler	Liam Neeson	
1993	Matinee	Lawrence Woolsey	John Goodman	
1993	RoboCop 3	Alex Murphy / RoboCop	Robert John Burke	
1993	Heaven & Earth	G.I. Paul	Robert John Burke	
1993	Rising Sun	Webster "Web" Smith	Wesley Snipes	
1993	Cliffhanger	Hal Tucker	Michael Rooker	
1993	The Dark Half	Alan Pangborn	Michael Rooker	
1993	Philadelphia	Walter Kenton	Robert Ridgely	
1994	Junior	Dr. Alex Hesse	Arnold Schwarzenegger	
1994	Star Trek Generations	Jean-Luc Picard	Patrick Stewart	
1994	Gunmen	Peter Loomis	Patrick Stewart	
1994	On Deadly Ground	Big Mike	Mike Starr	
1994	The Paper	Michael McDougal	Randy Quaid	
1994	Forrest Gump	Drill Sergeant	Afemo Omilami	
1994	No Escape	Hawkins	Ernie Hudson	
1994	My Girl 2	Phil Sultenfuss	Richard Masur	
1994	Cops & Robbersons	Norman Robberson	Chevy Chase	
1995	Johnny Mnemonic	Karl Honig	Dolph Lundgren	
1995	The Mangler	John Hunton	Ted Levine	
1995	The Quick and the Dead	Clay Cantrell	Keith David	
1995	No Way Back	Zack Grant	Russell Crowe	
1996	Space Truckers	Keller	George Wendt	
1996	Michael Collins	Michael Collins	Liam Neeson	
1996	Before and After	Ben Ryan	Liam Neeson	
1996	James and the Giant Peach	Cop	Mike Starr	
1996	Two If by Sea	Agent O'Malley	Yaphet Kotto	
1996	Eraser	John "Eraser" Kruger	Arnold Schwarzenegger	
1996	Bullet	Louis Stein	Ted Levine	
1996	Star Trek: First Contact	Jean-Luc Picard	Patrick Stewart	
1996	The Long Kiss Goodnight	Mitch Henessey	Samuel L. Jackson	
1996	A Time to Kill	Carl Lee Hailey	Samuel L. Jackson	
1996	Mission: Impossible	Luther Stickell	Ving Rhames	
1996	Maximum Risk	Dmitri Kirov	David Hemblen	
1996	The Wind in the Willows	Judge	Stephen Fry	
1996	Sleepers	Eddie "Little Caesar" Robinson	Wendell Pierce	
1997	Double Team	Yaz	Dennis Rodman	
1997	Batman & Robin	Dr. Victor Fries / Mr. Freeze	Arnold Schwarzenegger	
1997	A Life Less Ordinary	Jackson	Delroy Lindo	
1997	Mortal Kombat Annihilation	Shao Kahn	Brian Thompson	
1997	Conspiracy Theory	Dr. Jonas	Patrick Stewart	
1997	Masterminds	Rafe Bentley	Patrick Stewart	
1997	Kull the Conqueror	Kull	Kevin Sorbo	
1997	Starship Troopers	Sergeant Zim	Clancy Brown	
1997	Fathers' Day	Scott the Body Piercer	Mel Gibson	
1997	Air Bud	Arthur Chaney	Bill Cobbs	
1998	The Negotiator	Danny Roman	Samuel L. Jackson	
1998	Star Trek: Insurrection	Jean-Luc Picard	Patrick Stewart	
1998	3 Ninjas: High Noon at Mega Mountain	Dave Dragon	Hulk Hogan	
1998	Out of Sight	Buddy Bragg	Ving Rhames	
1998	Hard Rain	Mike Collig	Randy Quaid	
1998	American History X	Dr. Bob Sweeney	Avery Brooks	
1999	End of Days	Jericho Cane	Arnold Schwarzenegger	
1999	The Thirteenth Floor	Larry McBain	Dennis Haysbert	
1999	Random Hearts	George Beaufort	Dennis Haysbert	
1999	Muppets from Space	Man in Black	Hulk Hogan	
1999	The Green Mile	John Coffey	Michael Clarke Duncan	
1999	The Cider House Rules	Arthur Rose	Delroy Lindo	
2000	Mission: Impossible 2	Luther Stickell	Ving Rhames	
2000	Gun Shy	Charlie Mayough	Liam Neeson	
2000	O Brother, Where Art Thou?	Daniel "Big Dan" Teague	John Goodman	
2000	The Whole Nine Yards	Frankie Figs	Michael Clarke Duncan	
2000	The 6th Day	Adam Gibson	Arnold Schwarzenegger	
2000	The Watcher	Mike Ibby	Ernie Hudson	
2000	Highlander: Endgame	Duncan MacLeod	Adrian Paul	
2000	Animal Factory	Buck Rowan	Tom Arnold	
2000	What Lies Beneath	Dr. Drayton	Joe Morton	
2001	Evolution	Russell Woodman	Ted Levine	
2001	Gosford Park	Inspector Thompson	Stephen Fry	
2001	Pearl Harbor	Harold Thurman	Dan Aykroyd	
2001	Exit Wounds	Chief Hinges	Bill Duke	
2002	XXX	Augustus Gibbons	Samuel L. Jackson	
2002	Changing Lanes	Doyle Gipson	Samuel L. Jackson	
2002	The Scorpion King	Balthazar	Michael Clarke Duncan	
2002	Collateral Damage	Gordon "Gordy" Brewer	Arnold Schwarzenegger	
2002	Star Trek: Nemesis	Jean-Luc Picard	Patrick Stewart	
2002	Dark Blue	Arthur Holland	Ving Rhames	
2002	K-19: The Widowmaker	Mikhail "Misha" Polenin	Liam Neeson	
2002	Gangs of New York	"Priest" Vallon	Liam Neeson	
2003	The Core	Thomas Purcell	Richard Jenkins	
2003	The Fighting Temptations	Paul Lewis	Wendell Pierce	
2003	Terminator 3: Rise of the Machines	Terminator	Arnold Schwarzenegger	
2003	The Rundown	Bar Patron	Arnold Schwarzenegger	
2003	S.W.A.T.	Dan "Hondo" Harrelson	Samuel L. Jackson	
2003	Daredevil	Wilson Fisk / Kingpin	Michael Clarke Duncan	
2003	Daddy Day Care	Phil Ryerson	Jeff Garlin	
2003	Big Fish	Karl the Giant	Matthew McGrory	
2004	Around the World in 80 Days	Prince Hapi	Arnold Schwarzenegger	
2004	Twisted	John Mills	Samuel L. Jackson	
2004	Saw	John Kramer / Jigsaw	Tobin Bell	
2004	Kinsey	Alfred Kinsey	Liam Neeson	
2004	The Defender	Lance Rockford	Dolph Lundgren	
2004	Highwaymen	Will Macklin	Frankie Faison	
2004	Spartan	Stoddard	William H. Macy	
2005	Animal	James "Animal" Allen	Ving Rhames	
2005	Assault on Precinct 13	Marion Bishop	Laurence Fishburne	
2005	Batman Begins	Henri Ducard / Ra's al Ghul	Liam Neeson	
2005	Breakfast on Pluto	Father Liam	Liam Neeson	
2005	Memoirs of a Geisha	Colonel Derricks	Ted Levine	
2005	Sin City	Manute	Michael Clarke Duncan	
2005	Saw II	John Kramer / Jigsaw	Tobin Bell	
2005	The Man	Derrick Vann	Samuel L. Jackson	
2005	XXX: State of the Union	Augustus Gibbons	Samuel L. Jackson	
2005	Coach Carter	Ken Carter	Samuel L. Jackson	
2005	The Longest Yard	Sergeant Engleheart	Kevin Nash	
2005	The Ice Harvest	Bill Guerrard	Randy Quaid	
2005	Domino	Wanderer	Tom Waits	
2005	The Pacifier	Dwayne Murney	Brad Garrett	
2006	Seraphim Falls	Colonel Morsman Carver	Liam Neeson	
2006	Talladega Nights: The Ballad of Ricky Bobby	Lucius Washington	Michael Clarke Duncan	
2006	Bobby	Edward Robinson	Laurence Fishburne	
2006	Click	James Earl Jones	James Earl Jones	
2006	Click	Narrator	James Earl Jones	
2006	Dr. Dolittle 3	Jud Jones	John Amos	
2006	Freedomland	Lorenzo Council	Samuel L. Jackson	
2006	Mission: Impossible III	Luther Stickell	Ving Rhames	
2006	Saw III	John Kramer / Jigsaw	Tobin Bell	
2006	300	King Xerxes	Rodrigo Santoro	
2006	Art School Confidential	Professor Sandiford	John Malkovich	
2006	Christmas in New York	George	Eric Bright	
2007	Transformers	Optimus Prime	Peter Cullen	
2007	1408	Gerald Olin	Samuel L. Jackson	
2007	Saw IV	John Kramer / Jigsaw	Tobin Bell	
2007	The Last Mimzy	Nathaniel Broadman	Michael Clarke Duncan	
2007	Underdog	Cad Lackey	Patrick Warburton	
2008	The Incredible Hulk	Hulk	Lou Ferrigno	
2008	The Chronicles of Narnia: Prince Caspian	Aslan	Liam Neeson	
2008	Taken	Bryan Mills	Liam Neeson	
2008	The Other Man	Peter	Liam Neeson	
2008	Saw V	John Kramer / Jigsaw	Tobin Bell	
2008	Welcome Home Roscoe Jenkins	Otis Jenkins	Michael Clarke Duncan	
2008	Lakeview Terrace	Abel Turner	Samuel L. Jackson	
2008	Soul Men	Louis Hinds	Samuel L. Jackson	
2008	The Spirit	The Octopus	Samuel L. Jackson	
2008	Stargate: Continuum	President Henry Hayes	William Devane	
2009	Armored	Edward Robinson	Laurence Fishburne	
2009	Five Minutes of Heaven	Alistair (adult)	Liam Neeson	
2009	Chloe	David Stewart	Liam Neeson	
2009	After.Life	Eliot Deacon	Liam Neeson	
2009	Saw VI	John Kramer / Jigsaw	Tobin Bell	
2009	Transformers: Revenge of the Fallen	Optimus Prime	Peter Cullen	
2009	Surrogates	The Prophet	Ving Rhames	
2009	Where the Wild Things Are	Ira	Forest Whitaker	
2009	Indiana Jones and the Raiders of the Lost Ark	Sallah (2009 redub)	John Rhys-Davies	
2010	The Other Guys	P. K. Highsmith	Samuel L. Jackson	
2010	The Chronicles of Narnia: The Voyage of the Dawn Treader	Aslan	Liam Neeson	
2010	Clash of the Titans	Zeus	Liam Neeson	
2010	The A-Team	John "Hannibal" Smith	Liam Neeson	
2010	The Next Three Days	Damon Pennington	Liam Neeson	
2010	Alice in Wonderland	Jabberwocky	Christopher Lee	
2010	Saw 3D	John Kramer / Jigsaw	Tobin Bell	
2010	Marmaduke	Chupadogra / Buster	Sam Elliott	
2011	Conan the Barbarian	Corin	Ron Perlman	
2011	Unknown	Dr. Martin Harris	Liam Neeson	
2011	The Grey	John Ottway	Liam Neeson	
2011	Transformers: Dark of the Moon	Optimus Prime	Peter Cullen	
2011	Green Lantern	Kilowog	Michael Clarke Duncan	
2011	Mission: Impossible – Ghost Protocol	Luther Stickell	Ving Rhames	
2012	The Expendables 2	Trent "Trench" Mauser	Arnold Schwarzenegger	
2012	The Dictator	News Anchor	Chris Parnell	
2012	Battleship	Terrance Shane	Liam Neeson	
2012	Wrath of the Titans	Zeus	Liam Neeson	
2012	The Dark Knight Rises	Ra's al Ghul	Liam Neeson	
2012	Taken 2	Bryan Mills	Liam Neeson	
2012	Won't Back Down	Principal Thompson	Ving Rhames	
2012	The Samaritan	Foley	Samuel L. Jackson	
2013	Pacific Rim	Hannibal Chau	Ron Perlman	
2013	Percy Jackson: Sea of Monsters	Polyphemus	Ron Perlman	
2013	Third Person	Michael Leary	Liam Neeson	
2013	Anchorman 2: The Legend Continues	History Network Host	Liam Neeson	
2013	The Last Stand	Ray Owens	Arnold Schwarzenegger	
2013	World War Z	W.H.O. Doctor	Peter Capaldi	
2014	300: Rise of an Empire	King Xerxes	Rodrigo Santoro	
2014	Non-Stop	Bill Marks	Liam Neeson	
2014	A Walk Among the Tombstones	Matthew Scudder	Liam Neeson	
2014	A Million Ways to Die in the West	Clinch Leatherwood	Liam Neeson	
2014	Taken 3	Bryan Mills	Liam Neeson	
2014	Transformers: Age of Extinction	Optimus Prime	Peter Cullen	
2014	Guardians of the Galaxy	Thanos	Josh Brolin	
2014	Sin City: A Dame to Kill For	Manute	Dennis Haysbert	
2014	The Expendables 3	Trent "Trench" Mauser	Arnold Schwarzenegger	
2014	Sabotage	John "Breacher" Wharton	Arnold Schwarzenegger	
2015	Run All Night	Jimmy "The Gravedigger" Conlon	Liam Neeson	
2015	Ted 2	Customer	Liam Neeson	
2015	Entourage	Liam Neeson	Liam Neeson	
2015	Avengers: Age of Ultron	Thanos	Josh Brolin	
2015	Maggie	Wade Vogel	Arnold Schwarzenegger	
2015	Terminator Genisys	Terminator / Pops	Arnold Schwarzenegger	
2015	Mission: Impossible – Rogue Nation	Luther Stickell	Ving Rhames	
2015	Spotlight	Richard Sipe	Richard Jenkins	
2016	The Huntsman: Winter's War	Narrator	Liam Neeson	
2016	Silence	Cristóvão Ferreira	Liam Neeson	
2016	A Monster Calls	The Monster	Liam Neeson	
2016	The Jungle Book	Shere Khan	Idris Elba	
2016	Warcraft	Blackhand	Clancy Brown	
2016	Jason Bourne	Richard Webb	Gregg Henry	
2017	Jigsaw	John Kramer / Jigsaw	Tobin Bell	
2017	Mark Felt: The Man Who Brought Down the White House	Mark Felt	Liam Neeson	
2017	Transformers: The Last Knight	Optimus Prime	Peter Cullen	
2017	Father Figures	Rod Hamilton	Ving Rhames	
2017	XXX: Return of Xander Cage	Augustus Gibbons	Samuel L. Jackson	
2017	The Mummy	Colonel Greenway	Courtney B. Vance	
2018	Aquaman	Nereus	Dolph Lundgren	
2018	Creed II	Ivan Drago	Dolph Lundgren	
2018	Asher	Asher	Ron Perlman	
2018	Avengers: Infinity War	Thanos	Josh Brolin	
2018	The Commuter	Michael MacCauley	Liam Neeson	
2018	Widows	Harry Rawlings	Liam Neeson	
2018	The Ballad of Buster Scruggs	Impresario	Liam Neeson	
2018	Bumblebee	Optimus Prime	Peter Cullen	
2018	Mission: Impossible – Fallout	Luther Stickell	Ving Rhames	
2019	Terminator: Dark Fate	T-800 / Carl	Arnold Schwarzenegger	
2019	Shaft	John Shaft II	Samuel L. Jackson	
2019	Cold Pursuit	Nels Coxman	Liam Neeson	
2019	Men in Black: International	High T	Liam Neeson	
2019	Avengers: Endgame	Thanos	Josh Brolin	
2020	Honest Thief	Tom Dolan	Liam Neeson	
2020	Monster Hunter	The Admiral	Ron Perlman	
2020	Da 5 Bloods	Paul	Delroy Lindo	
2021	The Marksman	Jim Hanson	Liam Neeson	
2021	The Ice Road	Mike McCann	Liam Neeson	
2021	Zack Snyder's Justice League	Darkseid	Ray Porter	
2022	Blacklight	Travis Block	Liam Neeson	
2022	Memory	Alex Lewis	Liam Neeson	
2022	Dog	Gus	Kevin Nash	
2023	Transformers: Rise of the Beasts	Optimus Prime	Peter Cullen	
2023	Saw X	John Kramer / Jigsaw	Tobin Bell	
2023	Retribution	Matt Turner	Liam Neeson	
2023	In the Land of Saints and Sinners	Finbar Murphy	Liam Neeson	
2023	Mission: Impossible – Dead Reckoning Part One	Luther Stickell	Ving Rhames	
2023	Aquaman and the Lost Kingdom	Nereus	Dolph Lundgren	
2023	Wonka	Abacus Crunch	Jim Carter	
2024	Challengers	Tashi's father	Naheem Garcia	
2025	Mission: Impossible – The Final Reckoning	Luther Stickell	Ving Rhames	
2025	The Naked Gun	Frank Drebin Jr.	Liam Neeson	

==== Television (Animation, Italian dub) ====
Year	Title	Role(s)	Notes	Ref
1995–1999	Gargoyles	Goliath	Main cast	
1997	The Neverending Story	Falkor	Recurring role	
1999–present	Futurama	Zapp Brannigan	Recurring role	
1999–present	Futurama	Leonard Nimoy’s head	1 episode (season 1x01)	
2000	Night Warriors: Darkstalkers' Revenge	Demitri Maximoff	Main cast	
2001–2004	House of Mouse	Shere Khan	Recurring role	
2003	Kim Possible: A Sitch in Time	Rufus 3000	TV film	
2008–2009	Death Note	Ryuk	Main cast	
2008–2009	The Spectacular Spider-Man	Alex O'Hirn / Rhino	Recurring role	
2009–2010	Code Geass	Andreas Darlton	Recurring role	
2010–present	Family Guy	Jerome	Recurring role	
2010–present	Family Guy	Liam Neeson	1 episode (season 13x17)	
2011–2019	The Amazing World of Gumball	Hector Jötunheim	Recurring role	
2012–2017	Ultimate Spider-Man	Nick Fury	Recurring role	
2012–2018	Teenage Mutant Ninja Turtles	Splinter	Main cast	
2013–2015	Hulk and the Agents of S.M.A.S.H.	Nick Fury	Recurring role	
2013–2019	Avengers Assemble	Nick Fury	Recurring role	
2014–2015	Star Wars Rebels	The Grand Inquisitor	Recurring role (season 1)	
2019	The Dark Crystal: Age of Resistance	skekSo / The Emperor	Recurring role	
2020	The Wonderful World of Mickey Mouse	Big Bad Wolf	Guest role (season 1)	
2021–present	Invincible	Damien Darkblood	Recurring role	

==== Television (Live action, Italian dub) ====
Year	Title	Role(s)	Notes	Original actor	Ref
1989	Hunter	Captain Dolan	13 episodes	John Amos	
1991–1997	Star Trek: The Next Generation	Jean-Luc Picard	Main cast	Patrick Stewart	
1993–1999	Highlander: The Series	Duncan MacLeod	Main cast	Adrian Paul	
1995–1996	Thunder in Paradise	Randolph J. "Hurricane" Spencer	Main cast	Hulk Hogan	
1996–2000	Homicide: Life on the Street	Al Giardello	Main cast	Yaphet Kotto	
1998–2000	The Magnificent Seven	Josiah Sanchez	Main cast	Ron Perlman	
2001	The Day the World Ended	Dr. Michael McCann	TV film	Randy Quaid	
2004–2005	One Step Forward	Mariano Cuéllar	Recurring role	Juan Echanove	
2009	Chuck	Colt	1 episode	Michael Clarke Duncan	
2018	The Truth About the Harry Quebert Affair	Roy	TV miniseries	Ron Perlman	
2020–2023	Star Trek: Picard	Jean-Luc Picard	Main cast	Patrick Stewart	
2021–2024	Sweet Tooth	Tommy Jepperd	Main cast	Nonso Anozie	
2023–present	FUBAR	Luke Brunner	Main cast	Arnold Schwarzenegger	

==== Video games (Italian dub) ====
Year	Title	Role(s)	Ref
2003	Finding Nemo	Bruce	
2004	World of Warcraft	Grommash Hellscream	
2004	Terminator 3: The Redemption	Terminator	
2005	Batman Begins	Henri Ducard / Ra's al Ghul	
2011	Kinect: Disneyland Adventures	Bruce	
2013	Total War: Rome II	Military advisor	
2019	Mortal Kombat 11	Terminator	
2020	Cyberpunk 2077	Dexter DeShawn	
