= AppsBuilder =

Italian app company

- Company type: Private
- Available in: Multilingual
- Headquarters: Milan and Catania, Italy
- Area served: Worldwide
- Key people: Daniele Pelleri; Luigi Giglio; Abhinav Girdhar
- Employees: 30+
- Website: apps-builder.com
- Users: 800,000+
- Launched: April 2010

AppsBuilder was an Italian cloud-based self-service app creator designed to provide users with no coding skills access to tools to build native applications and HTML5 web apps.

== Overview ==
AppsBuilder is a cross-platform tool that allows users to create, edit and distribute mobile apps designed for use on mobile devices. Users can also create HTML 5 WebApps (mobile sites).

Its services are mainly addressed to private phone owners and SME, and rely on a cloud-based system, with analytics allowing users to monitor in real time their application's rates and trends. The platform offers also several additional marketing tools to monetize mobile applications, such as QR code generators, geolocalized couponing, in-app subscriptions and the opportunity to join mobile advertising networks such as iAD and inMobi – to integrate banners into applications and get new revenue streams.

Users can either follow the submission process by themselves or have the firm handle the process for them. The firm has developed a white label content management system (CMS), for users who create multiple log-in accounts to manage their clients’ applications and customize their layout.

== History ==
The project was initiated in April 2010 by two computer engineers, Daniele Pelleri and Luigi Giglio, who opened their first office in Milan, Italy, followed by a branch office in Catania. They obtained financing from the venture capitalists Massimiliano Magrini (Annapurna Ventures CEO) and Mario Mariani (The Net Value CEO). In 2012, they obtained further support from a €1.5 million funding by the venture capital funds Vertis Venture and Zernike Meta Ventures.

== Events ==
AppsBuilder has appeared at Wake up Italy! (Boston, 9–11 November 2012), TechCrunch Italy (Rome, 27 September 2012). Vedrò (Dro, 26–29 August 2012), VIII Edition. Social Media Week (Milan, 19–23 September 2011), TechCrunch Disrupt 2013 (New York, 28 April - 1 May 2013), and WWWorkers Camp (Bologna, 8–9 May 2013)
