= Sportitalia =

Italian sports TV channel

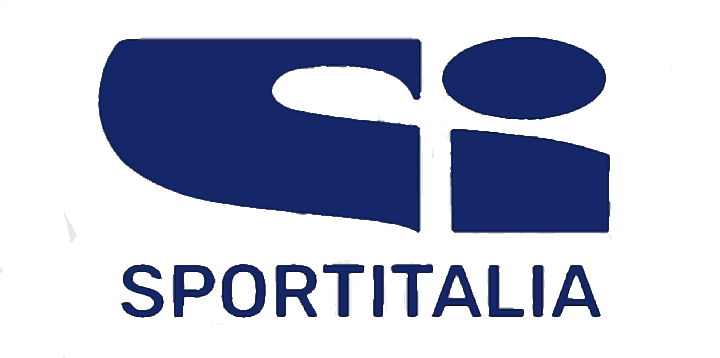
- Country: Italy

Programming
- Picture format: 16:9 HDTV

Ownership
- Owner: Italian Sport Communication
- Sister channels: SoloCalcio

History
- Launched: 6 February 2004

Links
- Website: sportitalia.com

Availability

Terrestrial
- Digital: DVB-T, LCN 60, Where available

Streaming media
- Sportitalia: Sportitalia

Sportitalia is an Italian terrestrial and satellite television channel owned by Italian Sport Communication, specialized in sports broadcasting 24 hours a day. Sports broadcast include soccer, basketball, tennis, cycling, volley, motoristic sports, rugby, wrestling; information about other sports (winter sports, badminton, boxe, golf, surf, skate, swimming, boating, canoe/Kayak, American football, baseball and cricket) is also provided.

It is broadcast FTA on DTT in Italy channel 60 on Mux DFree, in HD in HbbTV mode and streaming. On 1 August 2020 Sportitalia 1, 2 and 24 returned on DTT in Italy in national free-on-air on Mux Dfree.

== Story ==
The channel's origins stem after the decision of the Italian Competition Authority, an Italian organism that checks positions of privileges at favour of a firm, to subordinate the creation of SKY Italia to the transfer of the frequencies of the two analogue codified channels possessed by Tele+, Tele+Bianco and Tele+Nero.

The financier Tarak Ben Ammar bought the frequencies in collaboration with the satellite channel Eurosport. The frequencies became of property at 51% of the Holland Coordinator and Service, Tarak Ben Ammar's firm, and at 49% of the TF1 Group, principal commercial French TV channel, which also owns Eurosport. Subsequently, in 2004 Tarak Ben Ammar successfully lobbied the then Italian Communications Minister Maurizio Gasparri for a decree allowing him to convert the concessions from crypted TV to free TV: here, then, Sportitalia.

Seen the excellent share of the first 18 months of the channel, other two DTT channels were created: Si Live 24, an all sports news channels 24 hours a day, and Si Solo Calcio, an all soccer channel (both channels transmits some matches of "Serie B", the Italian Second Division, in exclusive, free with the DTT technology); Si Live 24 became first Sportitalia 24 and now Sportitalia 2, and Si Solo Calcio ended its transmissions.

Starting from 6 January 2006 Sportitalia entered in SKY Italia platform and from 16 May 2006 stopped the analogue transmissions.

From 01:00 AM to 07:00 AM (CET) Sportitalia simulcast NBA TV every night.

== Programming ==
- Copa América (in 2024, simulcast with Mola)
- Campionato Primavera 1 (2023-2024, all exclusive matches)
- Coppa Italia Primavera (exclusive until 2024)
- Supercoppa Primavera (exclusive until 2024)
- Serie D (2021/22 live)
- Allsvenskan (2021 live)
- Scottish Cup (2020/21 live)
- Ukrainian Premier League (2021/22 live, Shakhtar Donetsk matches)
- Saudi Professional League
- Saudi King's Cup
- Saudi Super Cup
- Copa de la Liga Profesional (2021 live)
- Argentine Primera División (2021 live)
- Campeonato Brasileiro Série A (2021 live)
- Campeonato Carioca (2021 live)
- NASCAR Cup Series
- NASCAR Xfinity Series
- NASCAR Camping World Truck Series
