= Giuseppe Soleri =

Italian television actor (born 1982)

- Born: Giuseppe Saccà; 10 May 1982 (age 43); Rome, Italy
- Occupations: actor producer
- Height: 1.77 m (5 ft 10 in)

Giuseppe Soleri (born 10 May 1982) is an Italian television actor.

== Biography ==
Soleri was born in Rome. He began to acting in 2004 with the Television Crime mini-series La omicidi. Soleri started his cinema acting with Action Comedy film The 17th Floor and worked besides as producer on them. Among his roles is that of Gargiulo in the L'ispettore Coliandro series. Soleri starred also in the Television films The murders and the five Days of Milan. Soleri has also starred in the Crime-Drama TV series Carabinieri 7. He acted 2008 also in the black and white Drama film Altromondo and the Television miniseries Mal'aria.

=== Personal life ===
He is the son of journalist and RAI manager Agostino Saccà.

== Filmography ==
Year	Film	Credited as		
Year	Film	Producer	Actor	Role
2004	Le cinque giornate di Milano	No	Yes	Carlino
2005	Floor 17	Yes	Yes	Meroni
2008	Altromondo	No	Yes	Edoardo
2009	Mal'aria	No	Yes	Maggioli
2010	Ubaldo Terzani Horror Show	No	Yes	Alessio Rinaldi

=== Television ===
Year	Title
2004	"La omicidi" – TV mini-series
2005	"Les Rois maudits" – TV mini-series
2006	"L'ispettore Coliandro" – TV series
2007	"La lance de la destinée" – TV series
2008	"Carabinieri"
