= Sportitalia 2 =

SI LIVE 24
- Country: Italy

Programming
- Picture format: 16:9 SDTV

Ownership
- Owner: Italia Sport Communication S.r.l. and GM Comunicazione S.r.l.
- Sister channels: Sportitalia; SoloCalcio

History
- Launched: September 1, 2005
- Former names: Sportitalia 24 (2006-2009) Sportitalia 2 (2009-2013)

Links
- Website: sportitalia.com

Availability

Streaming media
- Sportitalia.com: Live Streaming

Sportitalia Live 24 (known as SI Live 24) is an Italian sports channel, national sports television channel that broadcasts via the internet and via HbbTV.

== History ==
Born as a gemmation by his sister Sportitalia at the beginning of September 2005 with the name of SI Live 24 then becoming in 2007 Sportitalia 24.

From Saturday, April 5, 2008 Sportitalia 24 was also visible in streaming on the official website of the broadcaster.

Since 9 January 2009, Sportitalia and Sportitalia 24 (not included in the ranking relating to the allocation of 40% of the transmission capacity of the national multiplexes) have ceased broadcasting on the Mediaset 2 mux moving to the TIMB 1 mux.

From 10 March 2009 Sportitalia 24 has joined the Sky Italia platform on channel 226.

From 21 August 2009 the channel changed its name to Sportitalia 2. Since the beginning of November of the same year, Sportitalia and Sportitalia 2 broadcast various events in 16:9. During these transmissions, however, the correct flag is not activated.

Since 14 February 2011 the Sportitalia 2 channel has changed multiplexes to digital terrestrial. Tivuitalia, a Screen Service company, has been awarded a contract to broadcast Sportitalia's channels on its frequencies for two years. [1]

Since 7 December 2011 the Sportitalia 1 and Sportitalia 2 channels have been included in the TIMB 2 mux only where the switch-off has already taken place while from 12 December 2011 they are visible to everyone always on the TIMB 2 mux.

On 5 June 2012 the channels Sportitalia 1, Sportitalia 2 and Sportitalia 24 were removed from the Mux TivuItalia.

On 1 November 2013 at midnight the channels Sportitalia 1, Sportitalia 2 and Sportitalia 24 were closed and replaced by the new channels of the LT group Multimedia Sport Uno, Sport Due, Sport Tre which in turn were closed on 20 February 2014.

On July 1, 2019, almost 6 years after the closure, the broadcaster returns to the air as SI Live 24, exclusively streaming via the web and in HbbTV mode on enabled Smart TVs.
