= Berardino Libonati =

Italian academic, businessman and lawyer

Berardino Libonati (1934–2010) was an Italian academic, businessman, jurist and lawyer. He was the president of Alitalia. He was born in Rome, Italy on March 8, 1934 and died in Rome on November 30, 2010.

He graduated from La Sapienza University in Rome and was a professor of commercial law at the Faculty of Law at La Sapienza University. He was president of TIM and Telecom Italia and vice-president of Unicredit. On February 9, 2007 Italian Minister of Economy Tommaso Padoa-Schioppa recommended that Libonati take over as president of Alitalia.
