= 2009 in Italy =

- Decades: 1980s; 1990s; 2000s; 2010s; 2020s
- See also: History of Italy; Timeline of Italian history; List of years in Italy

Events of 2009 in Italy.

== Incumbents ==
- President: Giorgio Napolitano
- Prime Minister: Silvio Berlusconi (→ Fourth Berlusconi government)

== Silvio Berlusconi controversies ==
Prime Minister Silvio Berlusconi is involved in several controversies in relation to his career and personal life (→ Controversies surrounding Silvio Berlusconi).

In late April 2009, his wife Veronica Lario wrote an open letter expressing her anger at Berlusconi's choice of young, attractive female candidates—some with little or no political experience—to represent the party in the 2009 European Parliament elections. On 3 May, Lario announced she was filing for divorce following her husband's attendance at a girl's (Noemi Letizia) 18th birthday party in Casoria, Naples.

== Trial of Amanda Knox and Raffaele Sollecito ==
Knox and Sollecito were tried for and convicted on 4 December of the Murder of Meredith Kercher: Knox is sentenced to 26 years in prison, Sollecito to 25. (CNN)

== L'Aquila earthquake ==
A major earthquake occurred in Abruzzo on 6 April, killing about 300 people.

== Events ==
=== January ===
- 16 January – Murder of Meredith Kercher aftermath: trial of Knox and Sollecito begins in Perugia.

=== February ===
- 2 February – Eluana Englaro's feeding tube removed after 17 years in vegetative state (she dies on 9 February).
- 6 February – Prime Minister Silvio Berlusconi issues a decree that would have forced the continuation of the treatment of Eluana, but president Napolitano refused to sign it.
- 17 February –
  - Walter Veltroni resigns as Secretary of Democratic Party. (BBC)
  - British lawyer David Mills is sentenced to four-and-a-half years in jail for accepting a £400,000 bribe from Italian Prime Minister Silvio Berlusconi. (BBC)
- 17 to 21 February – Sanremo Music Festival 2009: The Big Artists section won by Marco Carta's "La forza mia"; The Newcomers section won by Arisa's "Sincerità" (→ List of number-one hits of 2009 (Italy)).
- 21 February – Democratic Party elects Deputy Secretary Dario Franceschini as its new Secretary. (France 24) He disolves the Shadow Cabinet.
- 24 February – Italian Prime Minister Silvio Berlusconi and French President Nicolas Sarkozy agree to cooperate in reviving nuclear power in Italy. (BBC)
- 26 February – China's Navy and Denmark's Navy rescue Italian and Chinese merchant vessels from Somali pirates in the Gulf of Aden. (BBC)

=== March ===
- 13 March – Italy's Ministry of Foreign Affairs reports that three Doctors Without Borders volunteers kidnapped in Darfur, Sudan, have been freed.
- 21 March – One hundred thousand people protest against the Sicilian Mafia and Camorra in Naples. (BBC)
- 24 March – Tuninter Flight 1153 (2005) aftermath: an Italian court sentenced the pilot, Chafik al-Gharbi, to 10 years in prison for manslaughter.
- 27 to 29 March – 2009 Libya migrant shipwreck: one boat capsized, two went missing, one was rescued, perhaps 500 people perished.
- 29 March – The People of Freedom transformed from electoral list to a party.

=== April ===
- 29 April – The Italian cargo ship Jolley Smeraldo evades an attempted hijacking by Somali pirates. (UPI)

=== May ===
- 6/7 May – Around 200 migrants intercepted south of Lampedusa and handed over to Libyan police (policy of respingimenti, the "turnings-back").
- 9 to 31 May – 2009 Giro d'Italia.
- 13 May – 2009 Coppa Italia final: Lazio – Sampdoria 1:1, 6:5 on penalties.
- 18 May – Camorra leader Raffaele Amato is arrested in Marbella, Spain. (BBC)
- 27 May – UEFA Champions League final played in Rome: Barcelona – Manchester United 2:0.
- 31 May – 2008–09 Serie A won by Inter Milan (→ 2008–09 and 2009–10 in Italian football)

=== June ===
- 3 June – Chiasso financial smuggling case: two suspects detained, who tried to enter Switzerland with a suitcase in their possession with a false bottom containing what at first appeared to be U.S. Treasury Bonds worth $134.5 billion.
- 5 June – Prime Minister Silvio Berlusconi threatens to sue the Spanish newspaper El País for publishing indecent photographs of people at Villa Certosa in Sardinia. (BBC)
- 6 and 7 June – 2009 European Parliament election in Italy.
- 6-7 and 21-22 June – Local elections (→ it) and Provincial elections (→ it)
- 10 to 13 June – Leader of Libya Muammar Gaddafi officially visits Italy.
- 11 June – Italian students protest Gaddafi's visit to the country. (BBC)
- 20 June – Salvatore Miceli, member of the Sicilian Mafia, arrested in Caracas, Venezuela.
- 21 and 22 June – 2009 Italian electoral law referendum: turnout to low.
- 29 June – Viareggio train derailment: 32 people killed in fire after derailment of LPG train in Viareggio, Tuscany.

=== July ===
- 8 to 10 July – 35th G8 summit held in L'Aquila, instead of La Maddalena.
- 12 July – Kidnapped Italian Red Cross volunteer Eugenio Vagni is freed by Abu Sayyaf. (AFP)
- 17 July –
  - Pope Benedict XVI slips in the bath in his mountain chalet and is treated for a fractured wrist in Aosta. (BBC) (The Guardian) (The Irish Times) (RTÉ) (The Telegraph)
  - 49 members of a Sicilian Mafia syndicate, from the Lo Piccolo crime family, are jailed in Italy for extorting money, "pizzo", from shops in Sicily. (BBC)
- 19 July – A book claims there was a "New Year's eve party at his [Berlusconi's] villa, which featured 50 young women including naked lesbians".
- 28 July – Officials evacuate a newly built hospital in Agrigento in western Sicily after tests show it risked collapse in an earthquake. (BBC)
- 31 July – Patrizia D'Addario, the escort at the centre of Silvio Berlusconi's sex scandal, claims he and his party offered her a seat in the European Parliament until his wife complained. (BBC)

=== August ===
- 11 August – A German court sentences former Nazi army commander Josef Scheungraber to life in prison for his role in the murder of 10 Italians in Tuscany in 1944. (RTÉ) (BBC)
- 12 August – The Roman Catholic Church expresses "unease" and "mortification" over revelations surrounding the private life of Italian Prime Minister Silvio Berlusconi. (BBC)
- 15 August – Italian Prime Minister Silvio Berlusconi speaks at a news conference to say his country will crack down on organised crime over the next four years. (The Straits Times)
- 28 August – Prime Minister Silvio Berlusconi launches legal action against French weekly Nouvel Observateur, Spanish newspaper El País, and Italian newspaper La Repubblica, and has authorized his attorneys to prepare cases against British newspapers, charging the newspapers with libel. (Reuters)

=== September ===
- 2 to 12 September – 66th Venice International Film Festival, opened by Baarìa (→ List of Italian films of 2009).
- 17 September – A large car bomb attack in the centre of Kabul, Afghanistan, kills six Italian ISAF soldiers. (BBC) (Adnkronos) (state funeral held on 21 September).
- 27 September – Italian Prime Minister Silvio Berlusconi tells a rally in Milan about his encounters with President of the United States Barack Obama, saying: "What's his name? Some tanned guy... Ah, Barack Obama!", also commenting on his wife Michelle: "You won't believe it, but two of them went to the beach because the wife is also tanned". (IOL) (The Daily Telegraph)

=== October ===
- 1 to 2 October – Messina floods and mudslides: at least 31 deaths, 6 missing.
- 3 October – Thousands of people demonstrate in defence of press freedom in Rome, amid concerns of government interference. (The New York Times) (BBC)
- 4 October – Five Star Movement launched.
- 7 October – The Constitutional Court of Italy overturns a law offering Prime Minister Silvio Berlusconi immunity from prosecution while in office, ruling it unconstitutional. (Adnkronos) (BBC) (Al Jazeera)
- 12 October – Two people are injured in a bomb attack in Milan, after a Libyan man explodes a device at the entrance of an army barracks. (Adnkronos) (Associated Press)
- 20 October – Nearly 100,000 Italian women sign a petition after Silvio Berlusconi says a female politician is "more beautiful than intelligent" on live television. (BBC) (Reuters)
- 25 October – Democratic Party leadership election: Pier Luigi Bersani wins.
- 26 October –
  - It is announced that Silvio Berlusconi will stand trial on 16 November. (BBC)
  - A court in Milan rules that Mediaset run by Silvio Berlusconi is being anti-competitive against News Corporation run by Rupert Murdoch. (BBC)
  - Silvio Berlusconi has been diagnosed with scarlet fever. (The Times)

=== November ===
- 1 November – Police detain two more suspected mafia bosses, Pasquale and Carmine Russo, one day after the seizure of their brother Salvatore Russo in a raid near Naples. (BBC) (France 24)
- 3 November – Lautsi v. Italy: European Court of Human Rights declared that the presence of the crucifix in Italian schools was not legitimate (overturned in 2011).
- 4 November –
  - Imam rapito affair: an Italian court convicts 22 CIA agents and 2 Italian agents over the kidnap of Muslim cleric Hassan Mustafa Osama Nasr in Milan in 2003, in the first court case challenging the CIA's "extraordinary rendition" programme. (BBC) (Al Jazeera) (CNN)
  - Italian politicians and the Vatican condemn Lautsi v. Italy ruling. (RTÉ) (Jewish Telegraphic Agency)
- 7 November – Luigi Esposito, one of Italy's 30 most wanted men, is detained at a villa in Naples. (BBC) (ABC News)
- 15 November – Forbes ranks Berlusconi 12th in the list of the World's Most Powerful People due to his domination of Italian politics throughout more than fifteen years at the head of the centre-right coalition.
- 15 November – Domenico Raccuglia, considered one of Italy's 30 most dangerous fugitives, is arrested after 15 years on the run. (BBC) (AFP)
- 16 to 18 November – World Summit on Food Security 2009 in Rome.
- 20 November – Brenda, a transsexual named in a sex scandal involving former Lazio governor Piero Marrazzo, is found burned alive following a fire at her Rome flat. (BBC) (The Daily Telegraph) (Reuters)
- 21 November – Italian police arrest two Pakistani nationals suspected of providing logistical support to the group responsible for the 2008 Mumbai attacks. (The Hindu) (Reuters) (BBC News)
- 30 November – Prime Minister Berlusconi is in official visit to Minsk, Belarus.

=== December ===
- 5 December – Tens of thousands of people take to the streets of Rome in a national "No B Day" demonstration demanding the resignation of Prime Minister Silvio Berlusconi. (France 24)
- 13 December – Prime Minister Silvio Berlusconi is hit in the face with a statuette of Milan Cathedral after a rally in Milan's Piazza del Duomo.
- 16 Decembar – An unarmed 26-year-old man is detained after attempting to enter the hospital room of Silvio Berlusconi as he recuperates from the recent assault. (CNN) (The Daily Telegraph)
- 24 December – Pope Benedict XVI is knocked down by a woman during a procession before the Christmas Eve Mass at St. Peter's Basilica in the Vatican City. He is uninjured, but Roger Cardinal Etchegaray suffers a hip fracture. (Sky News) (BBC)
- 28 December – Seven people die in a series of avalanche incidents in Italy. (BBC) (Xinhua)
- 29 December – Two Italians are injured and one American is killed in a shooting incident in Badghis Province, Afghanistan. (BBC)
- 30 December – Police in Italy locate a wooden toy guitar sculpture which co-founder of Cubism Pablo Picasso made for his daughter Paloma. (BBC) (France 24) (The Daily Telegraph)

== Deaths ==
- 8 January – Flavio Orlandi, politician (born 1921)
- 10 January – Pio Laghi, Roman Catholic cardinal (born 1922)
- 9 February – Eluana Englaro, right-to-die patient (born 1970)
- 13 May – Achille Compagnoni, mountaineer (born 1914)
- 13 July - Giuseppe Alessi, politician, president of Sicily (born 1905)
- 6 August – Riccardo Cassin, mountaineer (born 1909)
- 8 September – Mike Bongiorno, television personality (born 1924)
- 9 October – Aldo Buzzi, architect, director and screenwriter (born 1910)
- 20 November – Lino Lacedelli, mountaineer (born 1925)

== See also ==
- 2009 in Italian television
- List of Italian films of 2009
