= 2009 in Italian television =

This is a list of Italian television related events from 2009.

== Events ==
- 21 March – Emanuele Filiberto, Prince of Venice and Piedmont and his partner Natalia Titova win the fifth season of Ballando con le stelle.
- 19 April – Matteo Becucci wins the second season of X Factor.
- 20 April – Ferdi Berisa wins the ninth season of Grande Fratello.
- 2 December – Marco Mengoni wins the third season of X Factor.

== Debuts ==
=== Serials ===
- Il commissario Manara – mix of procedural and romantic comedy, with Guido Caprino and Roberta Giarrusso, spin-off of Una famiglia in giallo; 2 seasons.

=== International ===
- 2 December – United States of Tara (Mya) (2009–2011)

== Television shows ==
=== Drama ===
- Una sera di ottobre ("An october evening") – by Vittorio Sindoni, with Vanessa Hessler, Gabriele Greco and Ottavia Piccolo; 2 episodes. A naive young girl becomes a detective to save her boy-friend, charged of murder.
- Tutta la verità ("The whole truth") – by Cinzia Th. Torrini, with Vittoria Puccini and Daniele Pecci; 2 episodes. The quiet life of a female lawyer is upset by the passion for an ambiguous surgeon, till to be accused for the murder of her lover's wife.

=== Variety ===
- Ballando con le stelle (2005–present)
- X Factor (2008–present)

=== News and educational ===
- L'incantatore di serpenti, la vita senza freno di Giancarlo Fusco ("The snake charmer, Giancarlo Fusco's boundless life") – documentary by Salvatore Allocca.

=== 2000s ===
- Grande Fratello (2000–present)

== Networks and services ==
=== Launches ===
| Network | Type | Launch date | Notes | Source |
|---|---|---|---|---|
| Lei | Cable and satellite | 25 January | | |
| Salute! | Cable and satellite | 1 February | | |
| Dahlia TV | Cable and satellite | 7 March | | |
| Sky Uno | Cable and satellite | 1 April | | |
| Live! | Cable and satellite | 8 April | | |
| Sky Uno +1 | Cable and satellite | 21 April | | |
| K2 | Cable and satellite | 15 June | | |
| Nick Jr. | Cable and satellite | 31 July | | |
| Onda Latina | Cable and satellite | 31 July | | |
| Fox Retro | Cable and satellite | 1 August | | |
| MyDeejay | Cable and satellite | 1 October | | |
| Südtirol Digital Fernsehen | Cable and satellite | 28 October | | |
| Cielo | Cable and satellite | 16 December | | |

=== Closures ===
| Network | Type | Closure date | Notes | Source |
|---|---|---|---|---|
| Sky Show | Satellite television | 21 April | | |
| Next:HD | Satellite television | 30 June | | |

== Deaths ==
| Date | Name | Age | Cinematic Credibility |
|---|---|---|---|
| 28 March | Renata Mauro | 74 | Italian television presenter |
| 8 September | Mike Bongiorno | 85 | American-born Italian TV host |

== See also ==
- 2009 in Italy
- List of Italian films of 2009
