= Guardia di Finanza =

Italian law enforcement agency

Guardia di Finanza Guardia di Finanza
- Coat of arms of the Guardia di Finanza, depicting the Cimon della Pala
- Motto: Nec Recisa Recedit (Latin); Does not retreat even if broken

Agency overview
- Formed: 5 October 1774
- Employees: 68,134

Jurisdictional structure
- National agency: Italy
- Operations jurisdiction: Italy
- Governing body: Ministry of Economy and Finance
- General nature: Gendarmerie
- Specialist jurisdictions: Customs, excise, gambling; Serious or complex fraud, commercial crime, fraud covering multiple lower level jurisdictions

Operational structure
- Headquarters: Rome
- Elected officer responsible: Giancarlo Giorgetti, Minister of Economy and Finance
- Agency executive: Andrea De Gennaro, General Commander

Website
- www.gdf.gov.it/en

The Guardia di Finanza (Italian: [ˈɡwardja di fiˈnantsa]; G. di F. or GdF; lit. 'Financial Guard' or 'Financial Police') is an Italian militarised law enforcement agency under the Ministry of Economy and Finance.

== Mission ==
The mission and institutional tasks of the Guardia di Finanza are stated in law 189 of 23 April 1959, and 68/2001 and are subdivided into priority ones (preventing, investigating and reporting financial evasions and violations, overseeing the compliance with the provisions of politico-economic interest and surveillance at sea for financial police purposes) and contribution ones (maintaining public order and safety, political-military defence of the borders and international antidrug operations).

The primary mission of the Guardia di Finanza is to protect the legal economy and the businesses operating in compliance with the law while ensuring that the Republic, the European Union, the regions, and the local governments can rely on a regular income and appropriate use of the resources meant for the community, and for supporting policies for economic and social revival and development.

Its activities are connected with the financial, economic, judiciary and public safety:

1. Tax evasion
2. Financial crimes
3. Smuggling
4. Money laundering
5. International illegal drug trafficking
6. Illegal immigration
7. Human trafficking
8. Modern slavery
9. Customs and borders checks
10. Copyright violations
11. Anti-Mafia operations
12. Credit card fraud
13. Cybercrime
14. Counterfeiting currency
15. Terrorism financing
16. Maintaining public order, and safety
17. Political and military defence of the Italian borders.

=== Reception ===
Interpol summarizes the Guardia di Finanza as

"a force with military status and nationwide remit for financial crime investigations and illegal drugs trafficking investigations".

Europol (the EU's law enforcement agency), summarizes this force as

"organized according to a military structure ... The tasks of the Guardia di Finanza consist of the prevention, search and denunciation of evasions and financial violations, the supervision of the observance of the provisions of political and economic interest and the surveillance at sea for financial police purposes. Therefore, the Guardia di Finanza is a police force with general jurisdiction over all economic and financial matters; it also contributes to the maintenance of order and public security and military defence along national borders."

== History ==
=== Light Troops Legion (1774) ===
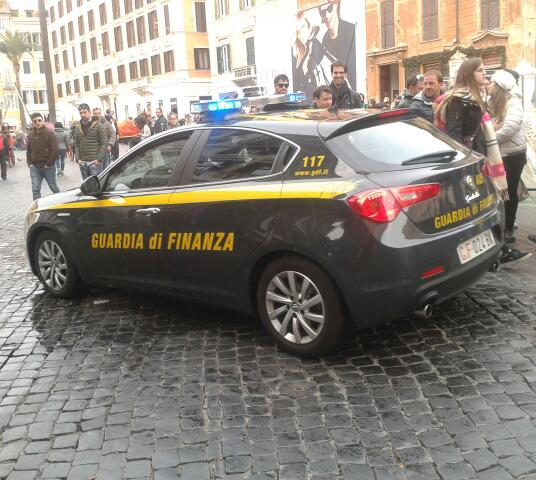
Guardia di Finanza vehicle in central Rome.

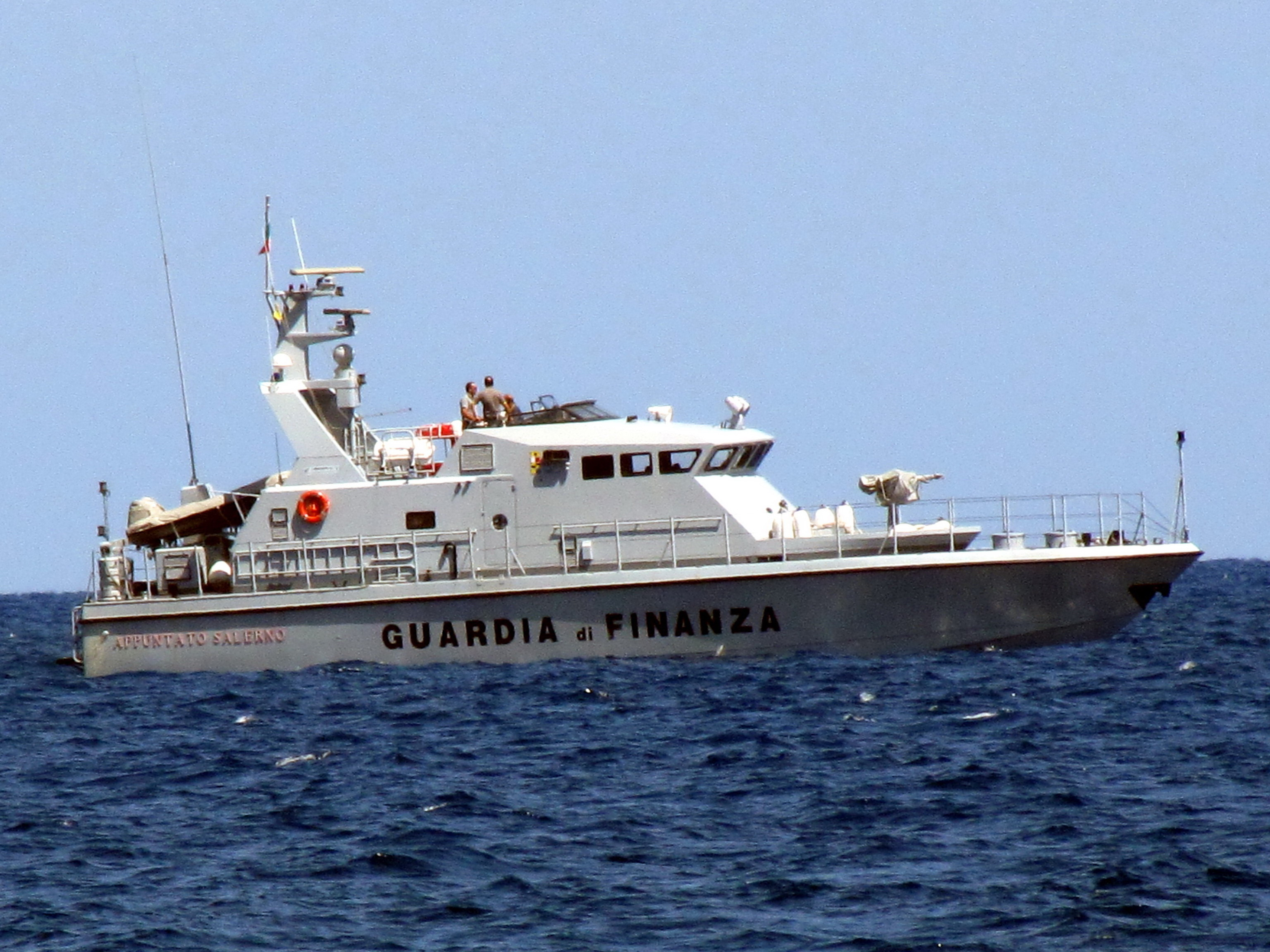
Patrol boat of the Guardia di Finanza.

The origins of the Guardia di Finanza date back to 5 October 1774, when the "Light Troops Legion" (Legione truppe leggere) was set up under the King of Sardinia, Victor Amadeus III. This was the first example in Italy of a special corps established and organized for financial surveillance duties along the borders, as well as for military defence. 5 October is thus marked as the Raising Day of the GdF.

=== Customs Guards Corps (1862) ===
Once the unification of Italy was completed in 1862, the "Customs Guards Corps" (Corpo delle Guardie doganali) was set up. Its main task was Customs surveillance and co-participation in the Country's defence during wartime.

=== Corps of the Royal Finance Guard (1881) ===
By Law no. 141 dated 8 April 1881, the Customs Guards Corps became the "Corps of the Royal Finance Guard" (Corpo della Regia Guardia di Finanza) whose task was to "impede, suppress and report smuggling activities and any other violation and transgression of financial laws and regulations", and to safeguard the interests of the tax administration, as well as to co-participate in enforcing law and order and public security.

=== Twentieth century ===
By Royal Decree dated 14 July 1907, the Corps was issued 5-point star uniforms to mark its military status, even though the Army's military discipline regulation was extended to the Financial Guard by Law dated 12 July 1908.

The corps served in the two World Wars and in the War of National Liberation, deserving 18 awards for its war flag, which had been granted in 1914 to decree the total integration among the Italian Armed Forces.

Subsequently, the Corps took part in numerous rescue operations during serious natural disasters; for this commitment, the Corps was decorated with 13 additional civil valour awards.

The re-organization of the police forces in 1919 also affected the Royal Guardia di Finanza. The responsibilities were divided between the Inspector General, who was an Army officer with the rank of lieutenant general responsible for military preparation, and the commanding general, who was a Financial Guard officer subordinate to the former but authorized to maintain direct relations with the minister for ordinary institutional duties and for personnel management.

In 1923, the "Investigative Tax Police" was set up as a specialized branch of the Royal Financial Guard. Within a few years, its naval fleet, motor vehicles and telecommunication structure underwent a complete change; the Statistical Service was equipped with a data processing centre, and the Air Service and the Canine Service (for anti-drugs checks) were set up.

During the same years, the Corps’ general organization was defined pursuant to Law No. 189 dated 23 April 1959, which laid down its institutional tasks, subsequently amended by specific sector provisions assigning certain responsibilities.

=== Recent history ===
Besides reviewing its organizational structure, laid out by the issuance of Presidential Decree Law no. 34 dated 29 January 1999, updating the Corps’ institutional tasks was completed.

Law Decree no. 68, dated 19 March 2001, whilst confirming the Corps’ configuration as a military structure, enhanced its role as a police force having general competence on all economic, financial and judicial matters for the safeguard of the public budget and that of the regions, of the local authorities and of the European Union.

The Guardia di Finanza Historical Museum is the custodian of the traditions of the Corps. It preserves artefacts of relevance to the Guardia di Finanza and promotes historical research, to aid researchers, scholars and military history enthusiasts.

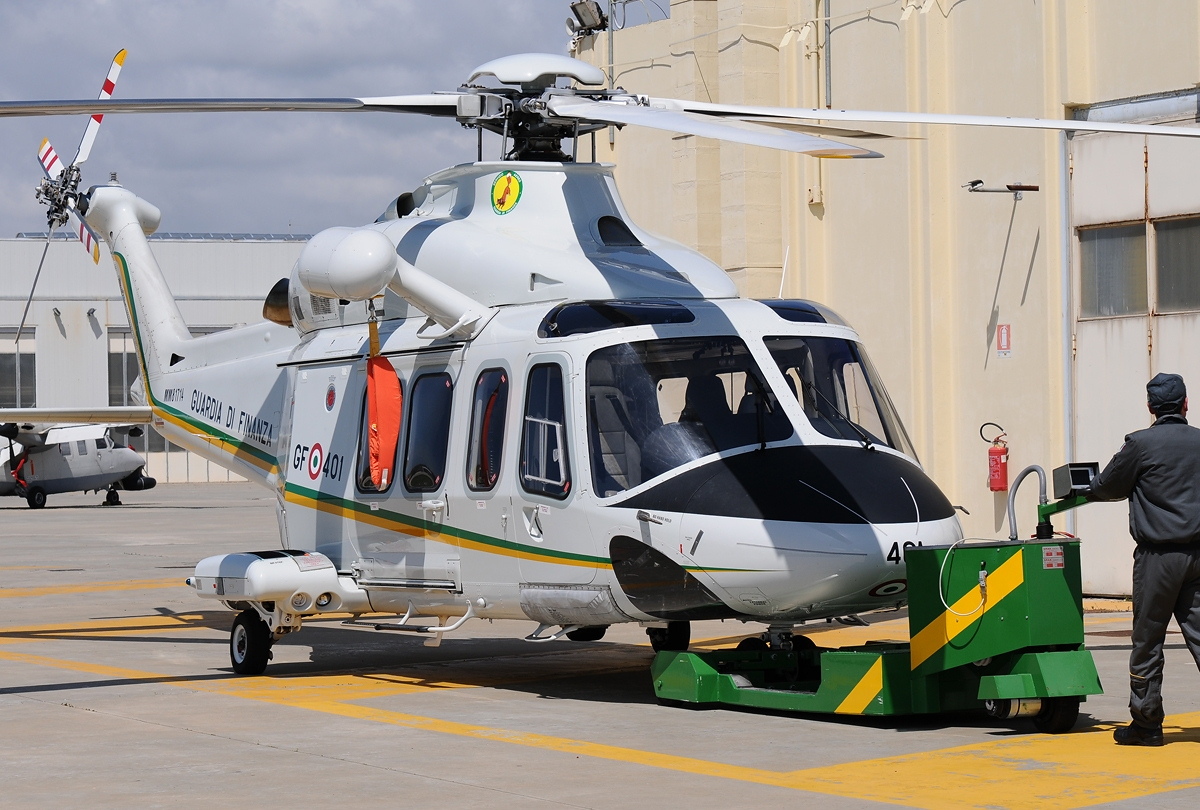
Guardia di Finanza Agusta AW139

In the Costa Concordia disaster, the harbourmaster of Livorno asked a Guardia di Finanza patrol boat to investigate the Costa Concordia's condition, after an unidentified crew member falsely claimed there was a blackout on board.

=== Chiasso financial smuggling case ===
On 3 June 2009, near Chiasso, Switzerland, (near the Italian border), officers of the Corps detained two Japanese nationals in their 50s who had attempted to enter Switzerland and had in their possession a suitcase with a false bottom containing U.S. Treasury Bonds worth $134.5 billion. These later turned out to be counterfeit.

== Organization ==
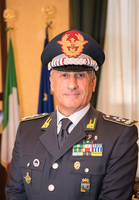
Generale di Corpo d'Armata Giorgio Toschi, general commander of the Guardia di Finanza from 2016 to 2019

The Guardia di Finanza is a militarized police force, corpo di polizia ad ordinamento militare, like the Carabinieri, but forming a part of the Ministry of Economy and Finance, not the Ministry of Defence.

Under the minister of finance and economy, the Corps is commanded by a General Commander and a Second-in-Command.

=== Commands ===
Under the general command are the following commands:

- Comando dei Reparti Speciali (Special Forces Command)
  - Special Unit of the Currency Police
  - Central Service for the Investigation of Organized Crime
  - Special Unit for Revenue and Public Expenditure
  - Unit for the Prevention of Community Frauds
  - Special Units Command, which cooperates directly with other government agencies, parliamentary commissions, and other central authorities.
- Comando Aeronavale Central (Central Aeronaval Command)
  - Aeronaval Operations Command, with one aeromaritime exploration group, and three aeronaval groups.
  - Aviation Centre
  - Naval Centre

=== Territorial organization ===
Territorial commands

- Six interregional commands
- Regional commands, one for each of the 20 Italian regions.
- Provincial commands, one for each of Italy's provinces.

Territorial units

- 74 Groups (of which five are Counter-terrorism Rapid Response Groups)
- 104 Financial Police Units
- 198 Companies
- 202 Lieutenant Units (Stations)
- 48 Brigades
- 26 Mountain Rescue Stations

Aeronaval units

- 15 Aeronaval Operational Units
  - 16 Naval Stations
  - 41 Operational Naval Sections
  - 13 Aviation Sections

=== Special departments ===
- Gruppo di Investigazione Criminalità Organizzata (GICO): Organized Crime Investigation Group.
- Gruppo Operativo Antidroga (GOA): Counter-narcotics Group
- Gruppo Anticrimine Tecnologico (GAT): Counter-cybercrime Group
- Gruppo Tutela Patrimonio Archeologico: Stolen Art Recovery Group
- Antiterrorismo Pronto Impiego (ATPI): Antiterrorism and Rapid Response Service
- Servizio Cinofili: Police Dog Division (K9).

== International anti-drug operations ==
From the statistical data of the anti-drug service central Direction, of the Department of the Interior, 60% of the drug seized in Italy by law enforcement bodies is found by the Guardia di Finanza. The Guardia di Finanza is responsible for 77% of the Heroin seizures, 69% of Cocaine seizures and 54% of cannabis (including Hashish) seizures.

On 21 July 2023, Italian Guardia di Finanza and prosecutors reported the seizure of 5.3 tons of cocaine in what they are terming the “most important cocaine seizure ever carried out” in Italy and one of the “most important worldwide”. They seized drugs with an estimated street value of approximately $950 million apprehending the merchant ship that transported the cocaine from South America and an Italy fishing trawler that was being used for the illicit transfer at sea.

On 17 April 2023, the Guardia di Finanza agents seized almost two tons (2,000 kilograms) of cocaine off the coast of Sicily, officials said. The haul has a street value of about €400 million ($440 million). The drugs were stored in about 70 waterproof packages and carefully sealed, the Italian Guardia di Finanza said in a statement. The authorities called it a "record" seizure. The bundles were held together by fishermen's nets and equipped with a luminous signalling device, Guardia di Finanza added. The "peculiar packaging methods and the presence of a luminous device to allow tracking" suggested that the haul was dumped at sea by a cargo ship in order for it to be recovered later, the statement said.

On 9 August 2018, the Guardia di Finanza intercepted the research ship Remus (Panama-flagged) in the Mediterranean Sea. The ship was taken to Palermo in Sicily for further investigation, according to Guardia di Finanza. Following the investigation, the authorities discovered 20 tons of hashish hidden in the ship's fuel tanks. The entire Remus crew of eleven has been arrested. All of them are nationals of Montenegro, the authorities informed. The hashish, worth between EUR 150 million and 200 million, was probably destined for the European market.

On 31 January 2019 the Guardia di Finanza seized more than 2 tons of cocaine in Genoa, northern Italy, which were on board a ship coming from Colombia and heading to Barcelona, Spain. «1,801 pure cocaine cakes, for a total weight of over 2,100 kilograms». The seized cocaine has an estimated value of about 500 million euros: it is the largest seizure of cocaine found in Italy in the last 25 years.

On 29 July 2019, the Guardia di Finanza of Genoa seized 368 kg (811 lb) of cocaine, with the collaboration and undercover agents of the United States D.E.A., the U.S. Customs and Border Protection and the Colombian National Police. The drug was in a ship from Colombia and direct to the Calabrian mafia called 'Ndrangheta.

On 1 July 2020, a world record in drugs was seized by the Italian Guardia di Finanza in Naples: 14 tons of amphetamines, and 84 million tablets with logo "captagon" produced in Syria by ISIS/Daesh to finance terrorism. More than 1 billion euro market value. This is the largest seizure of amphetamines in the world, carried out by the Neapolitan Guardia di Finanza in the execution of a specific decree issued by the Public Prosecutor of Naples - DDA and developed as part of a complex investigation activity delegated to the GICO (organized crime investigation unit of the Guardia di Finanza) against a network of criminal groups aiming to import a huge amount of drugs for European consumers. After the lockdown period, due to the epidemiological emergency from COVID-19, law enforcement activities have been intensified in the specific sector.

From the development of the clues that emerged during the investigation and particularly from other seizures previously made, the guardia di finanza tracked 3 suspect containers shipped to the port of Salerno, allegedly containing paper cylinders for industrial and machinery use. After the seizure, the GICO of NAPLES moved the containers to an equipped factory to conduct the internal inspection. The paper cylinders, about 2 metres high and 140 cm in diameter - likely built in Germany - were designed in multilayer in order to conceal the drugs — a perfect wall against the scan detection.

In the inner layers, about 350 kg of tablets per cylinder were stored (40 cylinders checked). A total of 14 tons of amphetamines have been found, which means 84 million tablets, bearing the symbol of the "captagon" which distinguishes the "jihad drug" made by ISIS. ISIS / Daesh finances its own terrorist activities, especially by means of drug trafficking, the synthetic ones massively produced in Syria, which has become for this reason in recent years the first-world producer of amphetamines. The captagon is marketed throughout the Middle East and then widespread both among fighters to inhibit fear and pain and among civilians as a fatigue relief. Initially produced mainly in Lebanon and widespread in Saudi Arabia in the 90s, this drug has also been used by terrorists in the attack on Bataclan in Paris in 2015 - thus becoming the "Isis drug" or "Jihad drug". According to the American DEA (Drug Enforcement Administration), ISIS makes extensive use of it in all the territories over which it has influence. Once the chemical plants of production are set, ISIS can easily produce large amounts of tablets for the world market of synthetic drugs, and therefore quickly fund their terror plots. Two weeks ago, still in the port of Salerno, the specialists of the Organized Crime Investigation Group (GICO) of the Guardia di Finanza, detected and seized another container with a roofing load consisting of counterfeited clothing, hiding 2,800 kg of hashish and 190 kg of amphetamines (over 1 million tablets) with the very same symbol (captagon). As for the final dealer, no single criminal group can afford a 1-billion purchase, so the investigators think about a "Consortium" of criminal groups, both for the total value of shipments, and for distribution on the reference markets (85 million tablets can satisfy a European market). The hypothesis is that during the lockdown, due to the emergency worldwide epidemiology, the production and distribution of drugs in Europe has practically stopped and therefore to the recovery many traffickers, even in the consortium, have turned to Syria, whose production does not seem to have slowed down. Further investigations are ongoing to identify all the entities linked to this extraordinary seizure.

On 19 June 2021, the Guardia di Finanza, during a special operation to fight smuggling and narcotics trafficking, seized 6 tonnes of hashish found aboard a USA-flagged yacht off the west coast of Sicily. The three crew members on board the vessel, identified as Bulgarian nationals, were arrested and taken to Palermo prison. According to the police, the street value of the drugs seized, found hidden in the interior of the ship, is approximately 13 million euros.

On 6 June 2022, Italian Guardia di Finanza pulled off one of Europe's biggest-ever drug impoundments, seizing 4.3 tonnes of cocaine in the port of Trieste. Investigators said the criminal gangs that bought the narcotics paid around 96 million euros for it and it would have been sold on the Italian market for a total of around 240 million euros. The operation, coordinated by DDA anti-mafia investigators, saw arrests and other freedom-restricting warrants executed with respect to 38 suspects. Around two million euros in cash was impounded too. Another hard blow to the most important group among Colombian narcotics gangs,” Italian investigators from the northeastern city of Trieste said of the seizure. The Guardia di Finanza agents said their work had uncovered a “dense network” of ties between South American cocaine producers and European buyers, who answered to organized crime groups operating across Italy, including in Calabria, home of the ‘Ndrangheta mafia. The investigation lasted more than a year and involved both the Colombian Police, National Spanish Police and US Homeland Security. Besides the cocaine, police also confiscated 1.85 million euros in cash.

== Personnel ==
The Guardia di Finanza utilises a rank structure similar to that of other state police forces in Italy but with ranks similar to the Italian Army. The Guardia di Finanza has around 68,000 members (agents, senior agents, superintendents, inspectors, and officers).

Its personnel are in service in the Europol and OLAF (European Agency of Fight against Fraud). Its Latin motto since 1933 has been Nec recisa recedit (Italian: Neanche spezzata retrocede, English: Does not retreat even if broken).

=== Officers ===
There are 3,250 officers in the Guardia di Finanza.

Officer cadets for the general and aeronaval branches are recruited through competitive examinations open to Italian citizens, not over 22 years of age, with a high school diploma giving access to university studies.

Officer cadets for the technical and logistic branches need a bachelor's or master's degree, and to be under the age of 32.

Officer cadets for the general and aeronaval branches are trained during three years of undergraduate studies at the Accademia della Guardia di Finanza at the campus in Bergamo, followed by two years of graduate studies at the campus in Rome.

Cadets who complete the program graduate as First Lieutenants with a master's degree in Economic and Financial Security Sciences.

Ranks and rank insignia of general officers

General of Army Corps
(Lieutenant-General); General commanding the Guardia di Finanza.

General of Army Corps
(Lieutenant-General); Second-in-Command of the Guardia di Finanza.

General of Army Corps (Lieutenant-General); interregional commanders have this rank.

Divisional General (Major-General, temporary Lieutenant-General).

Divisional General (Major-General); regional commanders have this rank.

Brigade General (Brigadier-General, temporary Major-General)

Brigade General (Brigadier General); provincial commanders have this rank.

Ranks and rank insignia of field officers

Colonel, temporary Brigadier-General (Brigadier)

Colonel, acting Brigadier-General (Brigadier)

Colonel, commanding officer (Colonel-Commandant)

Colonel; some provincial commanders have this rank.

Lieutenant-Colonel, temporary Colonel (Senior Lieutenant Colonel)

Lieutenant-Colonel, acting Colonel (Senior Lieutenant Colonel)

Lieutenant-Colonel, commanding officer

Lieutenant-Colonel.

Major, commanding officer

Major.

Ranks and rank insignia of company officers

Senior Captain (Primo Capitano)

Captain (Capitano)

First Lieutenant - Acting Captain

First Lieutenant (Tenente); first rank after graduation from the Academy.

Sublieutenant (Sottotenente) (Second Lieutenant); rank after three year at the Academy.

=== Inspectors ===
There are 24,000 inspectors in the Guardia di Finanza.

Participation in the competition for the recruitment of inspectors in the general and naval branches is open to Italian citizens aged between 18 and 26 years, having a diploma of secondary school giving access to university studies.

Inspector cadets attend the Scuola ispettori e sovrintendenti della Guardia di Finanza in L'Aquila for three years, at the same time studying at the local university, finally graduating with a bachelor's degree in business law and appointment as warrant officers. Inspectors in the naval branch continue with a year at the nautical school in Gaeta.

Ranks and rank insignia of inspectors

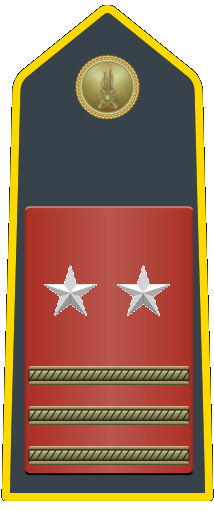
Sub-lieutenant special class (Ispettore - Luogotenente cariche speciali) (Chief Warrant Officer 5); commands Lieutenant Units (Stations).

Sub-lieutenant (Ispettore - Luogotenente) (Chief Warrant Officer 5); commands Lieutenant Units (Stations).

Adjutant Marshal(Ispettore - Maresciallo Aiutante) (Chief Warrant Officer 4)

Chief Marshal (Ispettore - Maresciallo Capo) (Chief Warrant Officer 3)

Ordinary Marshal (Ispettore - Maresciallo Ordinario) (Chief Warrant Officer 2)

Marshal (Ispettore - Maresciallo) (Warrant Officer 1)

Inspector Cadet (Allievo Maresciallo)

=== Superintendents ===
There are 13,500 superintendents in the Guardia di Finanza.

Superintendents are recruited through promotion from the ranks of the senior agents.

They are trained at a three-months course at the Scuola ispettori e sovrintendenti della Guardia di Finanza in L'Aquila.

Ranks and rank insignia of superintendents

Chief Brigadier Adjutant (Sovrintendenti - Brigadiere capo aiutante) (Master Sergeant)
same insignia as Chief Brigadier with star above chevron

Chief Brigadier (Sovrintendenti - Brigadiere Capo) (Sergeant First Class)

Brigadier (Sovrintendenti - Brigadiere) (Staff Sergeant)

Vice Brigadier (Sovrintendenti - Vice Brigadiere) (Sergeant)

=== Appointees and Agents ===
There are 28,000 appointees (senior agents) and agents in the Guardia di Finanza.

Competition for appointments as agent trainees is open for Italian citizens with one year's enlistment in the Italian defence forces.

Recruits are given basic training at either the Recruit School in Bari or the Alpine School in Predazzo.

Ranks and rank insignia of appointees and agents

Senior appointee specialist (Appuntato scelto qualifica speciale) (Corporal first class)
same insignia as Senior Appointee with star above chevron

Senior Appointee (Appuntato scelto) (Corporal)

Appointee (Appuntato) (Lance corporal)

Select Agent (Finanziere scelto) (Specialist)

Agent (Finanziere) (Specialist)

== Equipment and vehicles ==
=== Weapons ===
Weapon	Origin	Type
Beretta 92FS	Italy	Semi-automatic pistol
Beretta 84 BB	Italy	Semi-automatic pistol
Beretta PX4 Storm	Italy	Semi-automatic pistol
HK MP5	Germany	Submachine gun
Beretta PMX	Italy	Submachine gun
Beretta PM 12	Italy	Submachine gun
MP7	Germany	Submachine gun
M4 Carbine	USA	Assault rifle
Beretta ARX160	Italy	Assault rifle
HK416	Germany	Assault rifle
SPAS-12	Italy	Combat shotgun
SPAS-15	Italy	Combat shotgun
Sako TRG-22/42	Finland	Sniper rifle
Heckler & Koch PSG1	Germany	Sniper rifle
MG 42/59	Italy	General-purpose machine gun
M2 Browning	USA	Heavy machine gun

=== Cars ===
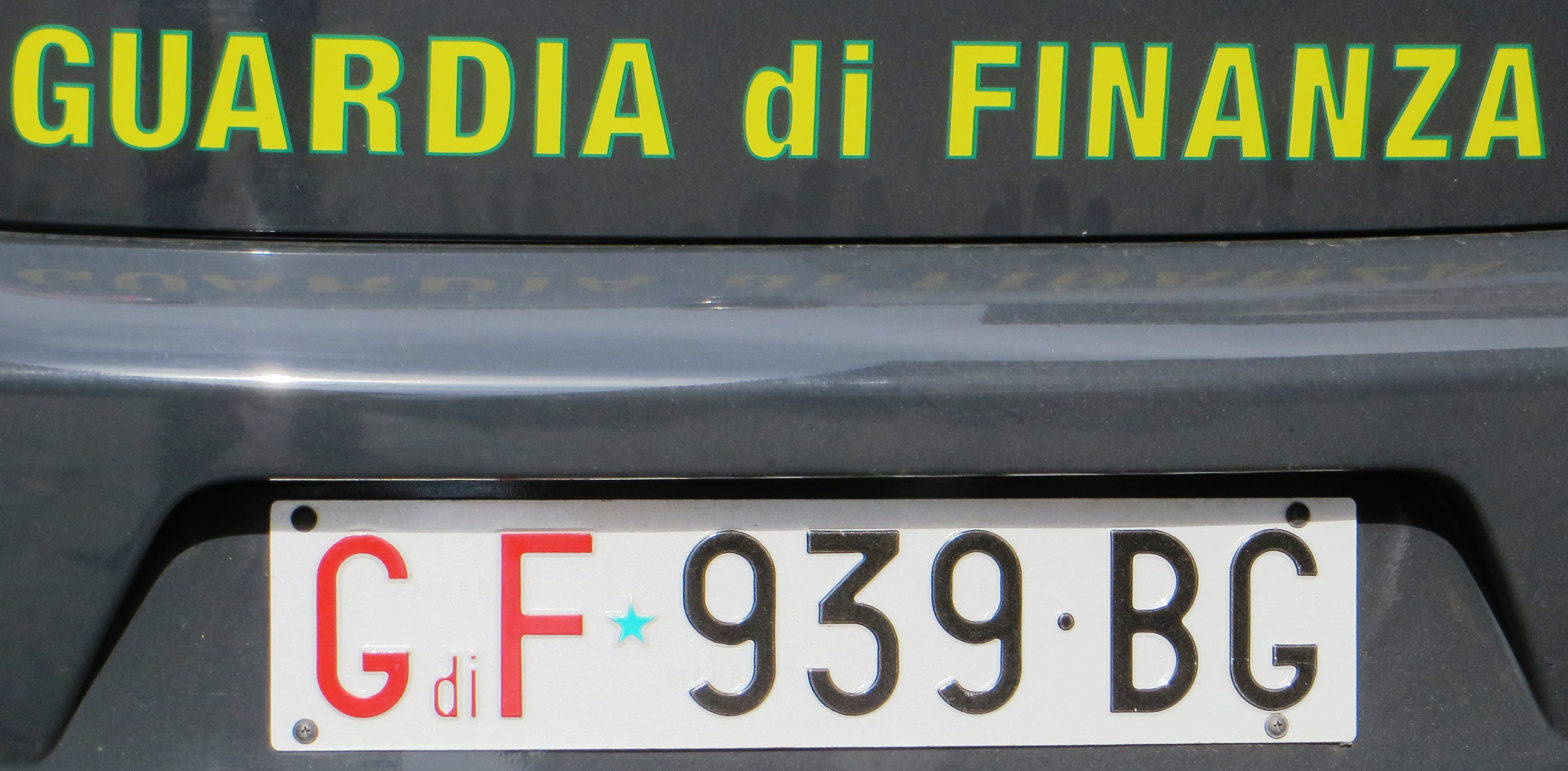
GdiF number plate, note the GdiF on the plate, similar to other police forces with their names on their plates.

- Fiat Grande Punto
- Fiat Nuova Panda
- Land Rover Range Rover
- Subaru Forester
- Volkswagen Up
- Volkswagen Passat
- Fiat Croma
- Alfa Romeo Giulia
- Alfa Romeo 156
- Alfa Romeo 159
- Fiat Bravo
- Fiat Stilo 1.9 JTD
- Land Rover Freelander
- Land Rover Defender
- Iveco Massif
- Iveco Daily
- Isuzu D-Max
- Fiat Scudo
- Land Rover Discovery
- Nissan Navara
- Jeep Renegade
- Peugeot 3008
- Iveco LMV

=== Fixed-wing aircraft ===
Type	Origin	Picture	In service	Note
ATR42-400MP	Italy; France		4	
P-72B	Italy; France		4	
Piaggio P.180 Avanti II	Italy		2	

=== Helicopters ===
Type	Origin	Picture	In service	Note
AgustaWestland AW169M	Italy		22 on order	Deliveries due between 2019 and 2024(Started November 2019)
AgustaWestland AW139	Italy		6	Eight more on order
Agusta-Bell AB 412	Italy		22	
Agusta A109AII / A109C / AW109N	Italy		33	
Nardi Hughes NH-500MC / NH-500MD	Italy		28	

=== Patrol boats ===
Ship	Launched	Commissioned	Shipyard	Picture	Displacement	Length	Speed (kn)	Weapon	Note
Cutters
Bandiera class: P04 Osum		22.9.2022	Cantiere Navale Vittoria - Rovigo on Damen Stan Patrol 6009 plans Italy; Netherlands		500 t	60 m			
P580 class: P01 Monte Sperone P02 Monte Cimone	7.10.2013 5.11.2013	8.2014 12.2014	Cantiere Navale Vittoria - Rovigo on Damen Stan Patrol 5509 plans Italy; Netherlands		460 t	58 m	28,2	1 x Oerlikon 1S, 20/70 mm; 2 MG 42/59 x 7,62 mm	
Zara class II batch P03 Denaro		28.3.1998	Fincantieri Spa - Cantieri Navali del Muggiano (La Spezia) Italy		320 t	51 m	35	1 x Breda 30/82 mm 2 x MG 42/59 7,62 mm	
Mazzei class Bigliani - Batch IV (Intermarine MV 115) : G.1 Mazzei G.2 Vaccaro		4.1998 5.1998	Cantiere Navale Intermarine Spa - Sarzana (La Spezia) Italy		116 t	35,5 m	38	1 x Breda 30/82 mm 2 x MG 42/59 7,62 mm	
Di Bartolo class Bigliani - Batch V (Intermarine MV 115): G.3 Di Bartolo G.4 Avallone G.5 Oltramonti G.6 Barbarisi G.7 Sottotenente Paolini	26.2.2003 28.5.2003 16.7.2003 26.7.2006 26.7.2006	3.10.2003 29.1.2004 24.6.2004 12.7.2007 20.12.2007	Cantiere Navale Intermarine Spa - Sarzana (La Spezia) Italy		134 t	35,5 m	35	1 x Breda 30/82 mm 2 x MG 42/59 7,62 mm	
Di Bartolo class Bigliani - Batch VII (Intermarine MV 115): G.8 Brigadiere Greco G.9 Cinus	9.2.2007 23.7.2007	15.5.2008 14.10.2008	Cantiere Navale Intermarine Spa - Sarzana (La Spezia) Italy		137 t	36,5 m	35	1 x Breda 30/82 mm 2 x MG 42/59 7,62 mm	
Corrubia class Batch II: G.92 Alberti; G.93 Angelini; G.95 Ciorlieri; G.96 D'Amato; G.97 Fais; G.98 Feliciani; G.99 Garzone; G.100 Lippi; G.101 Lombardi; G.102 Miccoli; G.103 Trezza		12 x Batch II: between 1995/1997	Cantieri Navali del Golfo - Gaeta (Latina) (first 11 hulls); Cantiere Navale Intermarine Spa - Sarzana (La Spezia) Italy		92,12 t	26,8 m	43	1 x Breda 30/82 mm 2 x MG 42/59 7,62 mm	
Corrubia class Batch III: G.104 Apruzzi; G.105 Ballali; G.106 Bovienzo; G.107 Carreca; G.108 Conversano; G.109 Inzerilli; G.110 Letizia; G.111 Mazzarella; G.112 Nioi; G.113 Partipilo; G.114 Puleo; G.115 Zanotti	G.108 1998 G.109 1998 G.113 1999		Cantiere Navale Intermarine Spa - Sarzana (La Spezia) Italy		94 t	26,8 m	43	1 x Royal Ordnance GAM B01 "Astra" 20/85 mm 2 x MG 42/59 7,62 mm	
Bigliani class Batch III (Intermarine MV 85): G.78 Ottonelli G.79 Barletta G.88 La Malfa G.89 Rosati	1996 1996 1997 1997	1996 1996 1997 1997	Cantiere Navale Intermarine Spa - Sarzana (La Spezia) Italy		95 t	27 m	43	1 x Breda 30/82 mm 2 x MG 42/59 7,62 mm	
Bigliani class Batch VI (Intermarine MV 85): G.116 Laganà G.117 Sanna G.118 Inzucchi G.119 Vitali G.120 Calabrese G.121 Urso G.122 La Spina G.123 Salone G.124 Cavatorto G.125 Fusco	18.9.2003 18.12.2003 12.3.2004 12.6.2004 28.7.2004 22.10.2004 28.1.2005 29.4.2005 28.7.2005 20.12.2005	2004 2004 2004 2005 2005 5.5.2006 1.6.2006 19.7.2006 20.12.2006 2006	Cantiere Navale Intermarine Spa - Sarzana (La Spezia) Italy		95 t	27 m	43	1 x OTO Melara Hitrole 503 NT 12,7 mm 2 x MG 42/59 7,62 mm	
Bigliani class Batch VIII (Intermarine MV 85): G.126 Salvatore De Rosa G.127 Finanziere Zoccola G.128 Vicebrigadiere Stanisci G.129 Finanziere Sottile G.130 Vicebrigadiere De Falco	29.9.2007 17.12.2007 10.4.2008 27.6.2008 21.10.2008	/ 21.10.2009 4.3.2010 21.4.2010 22.9.2010	Cantiere Navale Intermarine Spa - Sarzana (La Spezia) Italy		98,97 t	28,2 m	40	1 x OTO Melara Hitrole 503 NT 12,7 mm 2 x MG 42/59 7,62 mm	
Buratti class: G.200 Brigadiere Buratti; G.201 Generale De Ianni; G.202 Appuntato Salerno; G.203 Collonnello Rossi; G.204 Giuseppe Garulli; G.205 Gabriele Sanges; G.206 Finanziere Corrias; G.207 Maresciallo Cortile; G.208 Maresciallo Casotti; G.209 Brigadiere Prata; G.210 Finanziere Marra; G.211 Appuntato Gottardi; G.212 Finanziere Lapiccirella; G.213 Finanziere Perissinotto; G.214 Finanziere Rocca; G.215 Finanziere Pertoldi; G.216 Finanziere Verdecchia; G.217 Finanziere De Santis; G.218 Maresciallo Piccinni Leopardi; G.219 Finanziere Bianco; G.220 Finanziere Starace; G.221 Capitano Cultrona; G.222 Sottotenente Benvenuti	G.200 23.7.2007; G.201 31.1.2008; G.202 27.6.2008; G.203 27.6.2008; G.204 21.10.2008	G.200 2007; G.201 6.2.2008; G.202 11.2.2010; G.203 15.3.2010; G.204 22.3.2010; G.205 3.2011; G.206 21.1.2011; G.207 11.2.2011; G.208 18.2.2011; G.209 25.3.2011; G.211 23.9.2011 others between 2012/2014	Intermarine Spa, Sarzana (La Spezia) - Rodriguez, Messina; Effebi - Viareggio Italy		56 t	22 m	30	1 x Browning M2 HB 12,7 mm	
Meattini class: G.64 Darida		1972/1978	Cantieri Navali Baglietto - Varazze; Cantieri Navali di Chiavari; Italcraft – Lavagna (Genova); Picchiotti - La Spezia; Navaltecnica - Messina Italy		40 t	20,1 m	35	1 x Browning M2 HB 12,7 mm	57 delivered on Cantieri Navali Baglietto - Varazze plans

Source: *Note: G.94 Cappelletti was destroyed by a fire on board on July, 2nd, 2021. All 9 crew escaped without injury. Located in 'Retired' section.

=== Motorboats ===
Ship	Launched	Commissioned	Shipyard	Picture	Displacement	Length	Speed (kn)	Weapon	Note
Motorboats
5500 class: V.5503; V.5513; V.5514; V.5521; V.5523; V.5528; V.5534-5535; V.5541; V.5545; V.5549; V.5552; V.5555; V.5560; V.5566; V.5569; V.5573; V.5577; V.5579		1979/1981	Crestitalia Spa - Ameglia (La Spezia); Italcraft - Gaeta (Latina) Italy		7,85 t	12,05 m	33	1 x MG 42/59 7,62 mm	82 delivered, all on Crestitalia plans
5800 class: V.5802; V.5805; V.5812; V.5814-5815; V.5819; V.5826		1979/1984	Motomar Spa - Lavagna (Genova); Cantiere Navale Ascolani - San Benedetto del Tronto (Ascoli Piceno); Mericraft - Napoli; Cantieri Balsamo Shipping Srl - Brindisi; Cantieri San Prospero - Anagni (Frosinone) Italy		15,6 t	12,57 m	26	1 x MG 42/59 7,62 mm	33 delivered Motomar Spa project on hulls "Keith Nelson" type

=== Inland motorboats ===
Ship	Launched	Commissioned	Shipyard	Picture	Displacement	Length	Speed (kn)	Weapon	Note
Inland motorboats
V.A.I. 500 class: VAI 500-506			Italy						
V.A.I. 400 class: VAI 405; VAI 407-409			Italy						
V.A.I. 300 class: VAI 300-307			Italy		3 t	7,8 m	30		
V.A.I. 200 class: VAI 204-206; VAI 210; VAI 217; VAI 220-221; VAI 227-229; VAI 232; VAI 239; VAI 244; VAI 246; VAI 248; VAI 253; VAI 264; VAI 267-268; VAI 270		Batch I: 44 in 1986 Batch II: 43 in 1990	Cantiere Navale di Baia (Napoli); FIART Cantieri Navali Italiani - Biaia (Napoli) Italy		3,54 t	8,9 m	35		
V.A.I. 100 class Hurricane 920 OB-Cabin			Zodiac France		3,3 t	9,14 m	46		

=== Sailing vessels ===
Ship	Launched	Commissioned	Shipyard	Picture	Displacement	Length	Speed (kn)	Weapon	Note
Sailing vessels
Grifone	2002	2013	Sarasota Shipyards (Florida) (United States)		47 t	28,42 m			Rivolta 90 type ex Morning Star; Confiscated hull in 4.2012

=== Training ships ===
Ship	Launched	Commissioned	Shipyard	Picture	Displacement	Length	Speed (kn)	Weapon	Note
School ship
Giorgio Cini	11.2.1970	3.11.1984	Cantieri Navali A. Lucchese - Venezia Italy		770 t	54 m	13,5	1 x Browning M2 HB 12,7 mm; 1 MG 42/59 x 7,62 mm	Purchased 27.4.1983
Sailing ships
Grifone III (Barca Vela Grifone Fiamme Gialle III)	1987		Cantiere Navale D'Ambrosi - Lavagna (Genova) Italy		24 t	18,29 m	10		Sloop; Launched as White Angel; Confiscated hull
Grifone IV (Barca Vela Grifone Fiamme Gialle IV)	1991	2001	"Beneteau S.A." - Saint Hilaire de Riez (Francia) France		14 t	15,36 m	8		Oceanis 501 type ex Trottolina; Confiscated hull in 1995 by Stazione Navale di Genova

== List of Guardia di Finanza retired vessels (since 1950) ==
=== Patrol boats ===
Ship	Launched	Commissioned	Decommissioned	Picture	Shipyard Origin	Displacement	Length	Max speed knots	Weapons	Note
Patrol boats
Zara class I batch: P01 Zara P02 Vizzari		23.2.1990 27.4.1990	'00 '00		Fincantieri Spa - Cantiere Navale del Muggiano, La Spezia (Italy)	316,5 t	51 m	27	1 x 2 Breda 30/82 mm, 2 x MG 42/59 7,62 mm	P01 Zara and P02 Vizzari for sale in 2012
Bigliani; I batch: G.80 Bigliani G.81 Cavaglia		1987 1987	31.5.2013 31.5.2013		Intermarine - Sarzana (La Spezia) (Italy)	90 t	26,4 m	42	1 x Breda 30/82 mm, 2 x MG 42/59 7,62 mm	Delivered 31.5.2013 to Romanian Politia de Frontera as MAI 2113 and MAI 2114
Corrubia class I batch : G.90 Corrubia G.91 Giudice	17.5.1990 20.7.1990	2013 30.1.1991	2013 (2010) 7.9.2012		Cantiere Navale del Golfo - Gaeta (Latina) (Italy)	88 t	26 m	43	1 x Breda 30/82 mm, 2 x MG 42/59 7,62 mm	
Corrubia classBatch II: G.94 Cappelletti	1990	between 1995/1997	2.7.2021		Cantieri Navali del Golfo - Gaeta (Latina) (Italy)	92 t	26 m	43	1 x Breda 30/82 mm, 2 x MG 42/59 7.62 mm	Destroyed by fire on 2.7.2021
Bigliani; II batch: G.82 Galiano G.83 Macchi G.84 Smalto G.85 Fortuna G.86 Buonocore G.87 Squitieri		G.82 1991	12.2.2010 14.5.2009 14.5.2009 12.2.2010 14.5.2009 12.2.2010		Intermarine - Sarzana (La Spezia) (Italy)	90 t	26,4 m	42	1 x Breda 30/82 mm, 2 x MG 42/59 7,62 mm	3 delivered on 14.5.2009 to Libyan Navy 3 delivered on 12.2.2010 to Libyan Navy
Meattini class: G.10 Meattini G.11 Amici G.12 Di Bartolo G.13 RD 36 G.14 Gori G.15 Ramaci G.16 Denaro G.17 Bambace G.18 Arcioni G.19 Steri G.20 Cotugno G.21 Manoni G.22 Giannotti G.23 Carrubba G.24 Guglielmi G.25 Salone G.26 Esposito G.27 Russo G.28 Ruviani G.29 Rando G.30 Cicalese G.31 Sessa G.32 Coppola G.33 Rizzi G.34 D’Aleo G.35 Baccile G.36 Cavatorto G.37 Fusco G.38 De Turris G.39 Chiaramida G.40 Cavalieri d'Oro G.41 Bianca G.42 Nuvoletta G.43 Preite G.44 Mazzeo G.45 Previti G.46 Silanos G.47 Ignesti G.49 Ciraulo G.50 D'Agostino G.51 Fiore G.52 Nuziale G.53 Tavano G.54 De Alexandris G.55 Stefanini G.56 Tridenti G.57 Fazio G.58 Atzei G.59 Cicalè G.60 Fidone G.61 Sguazzin G.62 Tavormina G.63 Colombina G.65 Pizzighella G.66 Sciuto		G.10 9.1970 G.11 1970 G.12 1972 G.13 19.7.1972 G.14 3.1.1973 G.15 1973 G.16 1973 G.17 1974 G.18 1975 G.19 1974 G.20 1974 G.21 G.22 23.3.1975 G.23 G.24 G.25 G.26 20.9.1975 G.27 G.28 G.29 G.30 G.31 G.32 23.3.1975 G. 33 G.34 G.35 G.36 G.37 G.38 G.39 G.40 5.6.1976 G.41 G.42 G.43 G.44 13.11.1976 G.45 G.46 G.49 G.50 7.1.1976 G.51 23.3.1975 G.53 4.12.1976 G.54 11.2.1978 G.55 11.6.1977 G.56 G.57 G.59 G.60 5.8.1977 G.61 4.6.1977 G.62 G.63 G.65 G.66	G.10 G.11 G.12 G.13 2010 G.14 2010 G.15 G.16 G.17 G.18 G.19 G.20 G.21 2011 G.22 2010 G.23 G.24 G.25 G.26 2010 G.27 G.28 G.29 G.30 G.31 G.32 2010 G.33 G.34 G.35 G.36 G.37 G.38 G.39 G.40 2011 G.41 G.42 G.43 G.44 2013 G.45 G.46 2013 G.47 2014 G.49 2013 G.50 2011 G.51 2010 G.52 2013 G.53 2011 G.54 2010 G.55 2011 G.56 2013 G.57 2013 G.58 2014 G.59 G.60 2013 G.61 2011 G.62 2010 G.63 G.65 2013 G.66		Cantieri Navali Baglietto - Varazze; Cantieri Navali di Chiavari; Italcraft – Lavagna (Genova); Picchiotti - La Spezia; Navaltecnica - Messina Italy	40,85 t	20,10 m	35	1 x Oerlikon 1S, 20/70 mm	57 units delivered
G.70 Gabriele class: G.70 Gabriele G.71 Grasso		2.1967 26.10.1967	5.2007 2010		Cantiere Navale Picchiotti - Viareggio (Italy)	54 t	23,20 m	34	1 x Oerlikon 1S, 20/70 mm (then reduced to 1 x Browning M2 HB 12,7 mm)	G.71 preserved to Museo del Mare
G.72 Genna	1980	first years '80	years '90		Sewart Swiftship (United States)	120 t	32,30 m	35	1 x Oerlikon 1S, 20/70 mm	ex Gandora ex Pandora confiscated since end years '90 as training ship to Scuola Nautica Gaeta For Sale in 2.11.2011
Higgins 78 foot class: Brigadiere Giannotti Tenente Lombardo Finanziere Feliciani	23.10.1942 16.10.1942 24.10.1942	12.3.1966	1969 1969 1974		Higgins Industries, New Orleans LA (United States)	66,5 t	23,7 m	41	1 x Oerlikon 1S, 20/70 mm	Temporary delivery from Italian Navy Brigadiere Giannotti: ex USS PT-88; delivered to Italy as GIS 0021, since 1.4.1951 as GIS 842, since 1.11.1952 as MS 842 and since 1.11.1954 as MS 442 Tenente Lombardo: ex USS PT-206; delivered to Italy as GIS 0025, since 1.4.1951 GIS 851, since 1.11.1952 as MS 851 and since 1.11.1954 as MS 451 Finanziere Feliciani: ex USS PT-210; delivered to Italy as GIS 0026 > MS 852 > MS 452
Dark class: G.72 Calabrese; G.73 Inzucchi; G.74 La Spina; G.75 Sanna; G.76 Urso; G.77 Vitali; G.78 Genna; G.79 Laganà	1954/1958	9.1968/2.1970	1989/1997		Vosper Shipyards - Southampton (United Kingdom)	57,0 t	21,74 m	27,15	1 x Oerlikon 1S, 20/70 mm	
Monti class: Monte Cimone Monte Sperone		27.10.1959 27.10.1959	1987 1987		Itoyz - Viareggio (Italy)	109,29 t	33,5 m	24,3	1 x Oerlikon 1S, 20/70 mm	
Corrubia class: Corrubia Giudice		27.3.1958 27.3.1958	end years '80		C.R.D.A. Cantieri Riuniti dell'Adriatico - San Rocco (Trieste) (Italy)	78,92 t	31,5 m	25	1 x Oerlikon 1S, 20/70 mm	
Cappelletti class: Cappelletti Garzone Miccoli		15.10.1954	end years '70		Cooperativa Costruzioni Navali del Lido di Ostia (Roma) (Italy)	40 t	22 m	16,6	1 x Breda Mod. 37 8 mm	then used as training vessels to Scuola Nautica Gaeta
Paolini class: Paolini Trezza	'40	1954	years '70		(Germany)	60 t			1 x Breda Mod. 37 8 mm	S-boat ex-Kriegsmarine
Alberti class: Alberti Lippi De Santis Cerretto	1943	1954/1956	1976		(United States)	28 t	19,3 m	20	1 x Breda Mod. 37 8 mm	ex USS Refitted by Cantieri Navali Neri - Livorno
Fairmile B class: Fais Macchi Mazzei Meattini Satta Smalto Genna Gori Agolletti Steri Fortuna Bertoldi Ciorlieri D'Antoni		1947 1947 1947 1947 1947 1947 1951 1951 1951 1951 1951 1951 1952 /			(Canada)	90 t	34,5 m	12	1 x Breda Mod.31, 13,2 mm	onboard Fais were mounted, in 1953, first Guardia di Finanza's radar
MAS class 500 Ist type: MAS 433 MAS 434 MAS 512 MA 12 (MAS 516) MAS 547 MAS 562		1946	1949 1949 first years '50 first years '50 first years '50 first years '50		(Italy)	22 t	17 m	+ 40	1 x Breda Mod. 37, 8 mm	ex Royal Italian Navy
Satta class: Spanedda	1938	1938	first years '50		Cantieri Navali del Quarnaro S.A. - Fiume (Italy)	63 t	25,25 m	13	1 x 76/40 mm Mod.1916 gun, 3 MG Colt	
Caron class: Caron; Cotugno	1934	1934	first years '50		Cantieri Navali del Quarnaro S.A. - Fiume (Italy)	60 t	23,05 m	13	1 x 76/40 mm Mod.1916 gun, 3 MG Colt	
Castiglia class: D'Amato; Marongiu	1930	1930	first years '50		Cantieri Marvi - Venezia (Italy)	42 t	24 m	11	1 x 76/40 mm Mod.1916 gun, 1 x MG	

=== Litoral patrol boats ===
Ship	Launched	Commissioned	Decommissioned	Picture	Shipyard Origin	Displacement	Length	Max speed knots	Weapons	Note
Litoral patrol boats
GL.432 class: GL.432; GL.433		1968			(Italy)					
GL.103 class: GL.103; GL.104; GL.105; GL.106		1964			(Italy)					
GL.205 class: GL.201; GL.202; GL.204; GL.205; GL.206		since 1956	end years '70		C.R.D.A. Cantieri Riuniti Dell'Adriatico San Marco - Trieste (Italy)	14,4 t	15,25 m	16,5	1 x Breda Mod. 37, 8 mm	
GL.300 class: GL.303 GL.304 GL.305 GL.306 GL.307 GL.308 GL.309 GL.310 GL.311 GL.312 GL.313 GL.314 GL.315 GL.316 GL.317 GL.318 GL.319 GL.320 GL.321 GL.322 GL.323 GL.324 GL.325 GL.326 GL.327 GL.328 GL.329 GL.330 GL.331		1956 1956 1956 1956 1956 1956 1956 1956 1956 1956 1957/1959 1957/1959 1957/1959 1957/1959 1957/1959 1957/1959 1957/1959 1957/1959 1957/1959 1957/1959 1957/1959 1957/1959 1957/1959 1957/1959 1957/1959 1957/1959 1957/1959 1957/1959 1957/1959	end '80s end '80s end '80s end '80s end '80s end '80s end '80s end '80s end '80s end '80s 1990/1994 / / 1992 / / / / / / / 1992 / 1992 / / / / /		Cantieri Picchiotti - Viareggio and Cantiere Navale Baglietto - Varazze (Italy)	17,8 t	15,5 m	28	1 x Breda Mod. 37, 8 mm	GL.324, GL.326 and GL.316 donated in 1992 to Malta as P34, P36 and P37 GL.314 preserved for Museo del Mare
Naves class: 5		1950			Cantiere Navale Naves - Gaeta (Latina) (Italy)	28 t	19,60 m	16,5	1 x Breda Mod. 37, 8 mm	

=== Fast craft ===
Ship	Launched	Commissioned	Decommissioned	Picture	Shipyard Origin	Displacement	Length	Max speed knots	Weapons	Note
Speedboats
600 class (Falco) (FB Design RIB 42' SF); Batch I: V.600		15.11.2001	2013		FB Design Spa - Annone Brianza (Lecco) Italy	3,3 t	10,4 m	54		
5000 class Batch I: V5000 and V5100		1992	2013		Intermarine Spa - Sarzana (La Spezia) Italy	27,15 t	16,46 m	52	1 x MG 42/59 7,62 mm	2 delivered
V.4000 Drago (Commander): V.1630	1973	1977			Italcraft - Gaeta (Latina) (Italy)	7 t	13,10 m	47		confiscated to drug merchants
V.4000 Drago (Commander) V.4000 V.4001 V.4002 V.4003 V.4004 V.4005 V.4006 V.4007 V.4008 V.4009 V.4010 V.4011		begin years '80	2008 '00 end '90 end '90 end '90 end '90 end '90 end '90 end '90 end '90 2008 '00		Italcraft - Gaeta (Latina) (Italy)	7 t	13,10 m	47		donated to Albanian Maritime Police (4 in 1999, 2 in 2000 and 2 in 2002): V.4002; V.4003; V.4004; V.4005; V.4006; V.4007; V.4008; V.4009 V.4001 preserved to Museo del Mare
V.1620 (Supertermoli type)		27.4.2000	2010		(Italy)	+ 14 t	18 m			confiscated hull
V.1694			2013		(Italy)					confiscated hull
V.1695			2013		(Italy)					confiscated hull
Speranza: 11 hulls (of witch V.1143)		1964	'80		CANAV Cantieri Navaltecnica - Anzio (Italy)	3,25 t	7,32 m	37		

=== Motorboats ===
Ship	Launched	Commissioned	Decommissioned	Picture	Shipyard Origin	Displacement	Length	Max speed knots	Weapons	Note
Motorboats
V.5800 class V.5800 V.5801 V.5803 V.5806 V.5807 V.5808 V.5813 V.5817 V.5818 V.5821 V.5822 V.5824 V.5825 V.5829 V.5830 V.5832 V.5833		/ / / 18.6.1980 18.12.1979 / 12.4.1981 10.2.1981 8.10.1981 / 23.11.1981 / 15.11.1981 13.9.1981 / / /	2013 2010 2013 2012 2013 2013 2013 2013 2013 2010 2013 2013 2012 2013 2010 2013 2013		Motomar Spa - Lavagna (Genova); Cantiere Navale Ascolani - San Benedetto del Tronto (Ascoli Piceno); Mericraft - Napoli; Cantieri Balsamo Shipping Srl - Brindisi; Cantieri San Prospero - Anagni (Frosinone) Italy	15,6 t	12,57 m	26	1 x MG 42/59 7,62 mm	Motomar plans on "Keith Nelson" hull type
V.5500 class: V.5500 V.5504 V.5505 V.5509 V.5511 V.5519 V.5520 V.5522 V.5524 V.5526 V.5527 V.5530 V.5536 V.5537 V.5538 V.5539 V.5543 V.5546 V.5548 V.5550 V.5551 V.5553 V.5554 V.5563 V.5564 V.5567 v.5575 V.5578		6.10.1979 18.12.1979 / / 14.2.1980 6.3.1980 6.3.1980 / 12.4.1980 / / / / 9.5.1980 / 17.7.1980 / 27.3.1981 / 22.3.1981 1.4.1981 / 30.5.1981 / / 20.11.1981 14.11.1982 23.11.1981	2013 2010 2013 2013 2010 2012 2011 2013 2010 2013 2013 2010 2014 2013 2013 2013 2013 2013 2013 2010 2010 2010 2010 2014 2010 2014 2013 2013		Crestitalia - Ameglia (La Spezia); Italcraft - Gaeta (Latina) (Italy)	7,814 t	12,05 m	33	1 x MG 42/59 7,62 mm	on Crestitalia plans
Tognacci class: MM.LL.84 MM.LL.85 MM.LL.86 MM.LL.87 MM.LL.88 MM.LL.89 MM.LL.90 MM.LL.91 MM.LL.92 MM.LL.93		second half years '60	'80		Cantiere Ing. Tognacci - Rimini (Italy)	4,05 t	7,78 m	36		

=== Inland water motorboats ===
Ship	Launched	Commissioned	Decommissioned	Picture	Shipyard Origin	Displacement	Length	Max speed knots	Weapons	Note
Inland water motorboats
V.A.I. 400 : VAI 404		/	2010		(Italy)					
V.A.I. 200 : VAI 200 VAI 201 VAI 212 VAI 216 VAI 223 VAI 225 VAI 234 VAI 236 VAI 237 VAI 238 VAI 240 VAI 241 VAI 242 VAI 247 VAI 251 VAI 263 VAI 273 VAI 277 VAI 279 VAI 285 VAI 286		/ 15.1.1986 / 25.9.1986 / / / / / / 25.9.1986 27.9.1986 / / 7.11.1988 28.1.1988 28.1.1989 12.5.1989 / / 19.5.1989	2010 2013 2011 2013 2010 2010 2013 2011 2011 2011 2010 2013 2013 2010 2011 2013 2013 2013 2013 2013 2013		Cantiere FIART - Baia (Napoli); Mericraft - Napoli (Italy)	3,60 t	8,90 m	35		
V.A.I. 3000 : VAI 3000		1.8.1978	2010		S.A. Italiana Ambrosini - Milano (Italy)	2,90 t	7,50 m			

=== Boats ===
Ship	Launched	Commissioned	Decommissioned	Picture	Shipyard Origin	Displacement	Length	Max speed knots	Weapons	Note
boats
MSF (Moto Scafo Fuoribordo): MSF 1 MSF 5 MSF 1601										
BSO (Battello Servisio Operativo): BSO 74 BSO 212 BSO 234 BSO 241										
BS (Battello Servizio): BS 5 BS 30 BS 50 BS 70 BS 92 BS 103										

=== Training ships ===
Ship	Launched	Commissioned	Decommissioned	Picture	Shipyard Origin	Displacement	Length	Max speed knots	Weapons	Note
Training ships
Paolini	1965	1977	1993		Cantieri Benetti - Viareggio (Italy)	348 t	38,75 m	9		ex Marcantonio Colonna for Istituto Tecnico Nautico Marcantonio Colonna - Roma
BYMS - Fiori (400); Oltramonti class: Avallone Maresciallo Aldo Oltramonti		1.5.1966 1.5.1966	1983 1983		Wheeler Shipbuilding, Whitestone NY (United States)	307 t	41,45 m	15	1 x Oerlikon 1S, 20/70 mm	Launched as HMS BYMS 2073 (first encoding in Italy as DR 402) and then M 5402 Begonia; in service between 1.5.1966 and 1983 to Guardia di Finanza, named Maresciallo Aldo Oltremonti as training vessel Launched as HMS BYMS 2141 (first encoding in Italy as DR 403) and then M 5404 Dalia; in service between 1.5.1966 and 1983 to Guardia di Finanza, named Avallone as training vessel
Pal Piccolo					(Italy)					ex Tulyar, confiscated
Galiano	7.9.1942	1959	1972		American Car and Foundry Co., Wilmington, DE (United States)	258 t	41,45 m	10	1 x Breda Mod.31 13,2 mm	Launched as USS BYMS-31 13.3.1943: transferred to Great Britain reclassified HMS J-831 Reclassified HMS BYMS-2031 10.7.1947: returned to U.S. custody, sold to Anthonio Theuma of Malta and named Nanridi Renamed Monte Carmelo Sold at Gibraltar 1956: confiscated by Italian authorities at Palermo (Sicily) for tobacco smuggling Severely damaged in 1972 by an explosion while it was docked in Civitavecchia during a cruise of education. For some time, under the auspices of M.M., it was proven use as a helicopter carrier
Generale Euclide Turba	1909	1919	1960		Cantiere San Rocco - Trieste (Austria-Hungary)	303 t	46,72 m	13		Launched as Zadar for Austro-Hungarian Navy since 1919 in service with Royal Guardia di Finanza 1933: named Generale Euclide Turba
Antilope class: Angelini Postiglioni	1927/1928	1927/1928	first years '50 1952		Bacini e Scali Napoletani S.A. - Napoli (Italy)	194 t	34,5 m	14	1 76/40 mm Mod.1916 gun, 1 MG Colt	3 units commissioned as Antilope, Camoscio, Capriolo Since 1933 named Angelini, Arcioni, Postiglioni
Sailing ships
Grifone II		3.6.1987	2013		Cantiere Catarsi V. Srl - Cecina (Viterbo) (Italy)	6,8 t	10,75 m			Confiscated hull
Grifone I			2012		(Italy)					Confiscated hull

== Unit awards ==
The unit awards, as depicted on the unit coat-of-arms, are:

- 3 blue and gold ribbons for 3 Gold Medals of Military Valour
- 4 white and gold ribbons for 4 Silver Medals of Military Valour
- 1 blue ribbon with VI for six Bronze Medals of Military Valour
- 1 blue and white ribbon with II for two Crosses of Military Valour
- 1 green-white-red ribbon with IX for nine Gold Medals of Civil Valour
- 1 blue and red ribbon, with a cross, for 5 Knight's Crosses of the Military Order of Italy

Awards not included in the coat of arms but are included in its State Colour are:

- 1 Gold Medal of Valor of the Finance Guard (2011)
- 1 Silver Medal of Civil Valor
- 9 Gold Medals of Civil Merit
- 2 separate Medals of Merited Service in Earthquake Relief (1908 and 1915, respectively)
- 2 Medals of Benemerited Financial Service
- 6 Gold Medals of Benemerited Service to Education, Culture and the Arts
- 2 Gold Medals of Benemerited Service to Public Health
- 2 Gold Medals of Benemerited Service to the Environment
- 1 Gold Medal of Merit of the Department of Civil Defence
- 3 Gold Medals of Merit of the Italian Red Cross
- UN Peacekeeping Medal (for service as part of UNMIK Kosovo 1995-2004)
- Gold Medal of the Eagle of the Republic of Albania (1997-2005)
- Military Double Gold Star of Sports Merit (2007)

== See also ==
- Financial Guard (disambiguation)
- Gruppi Sportivi Fiamme Gialle
- Law enforcement in Italy
- Tax evasion
