= Counter-terrorism Rapid Response =

Special unit of the Guardia di Finanza

- Antiterrorismo Pronto Impiego (Italian)
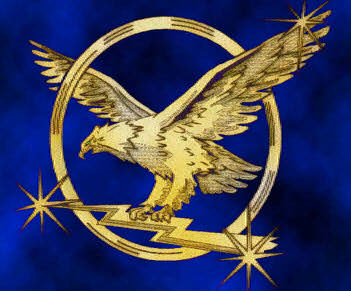
- Active: 1983 - present
- Country: Italy
- Agency: Guardia di Finanza
- Motto: Nihil difficile volenti Nothing is difficult for the one who wants
- Common name: Baschi verdi
- Abbreviation: ATPI

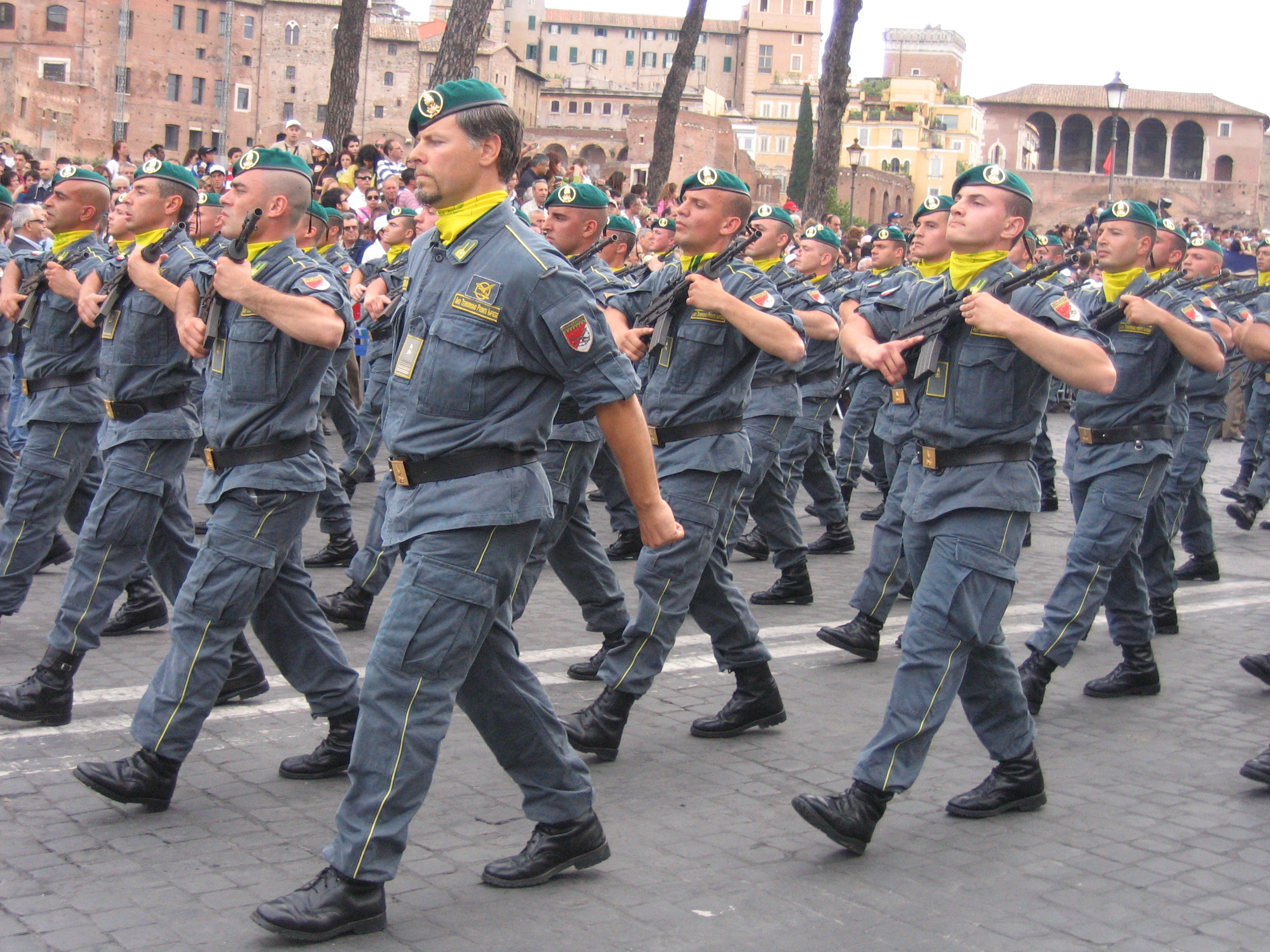
The ATPI in June 2007

The Counter-terrorism Rapid Response (Italian: Antiterrorismo Pronto Impiego, or ATPI), formed in 1983, is a special police unit of Italy's Guardia di Finanza. It is tasked with counter-terrorism operations and the protection of VIPs and places of interest in the country. The ATPI has also participated in operations in Albania, Kosovo, and Hungary.

== History ==
The ATPI was founded in 1983 during Italy's Years of Lead. It is the special-operations component of the Guardia di Finanza. The force's predecessor was the SVATPI (Scorta Valori Antiterrorismo Pronto Impiego), formed in 1977 to combat robberies by the Red Brigades of the Bank of Italy's armored cars. The SVATPI also escorted prominent individuals, including the Minister of Finance, to prevent kidnapping.

== Mission ==
The unit specializes in counter-terrorism activity, supervising airports, ports, and other sensitive targets. It also combats illicit trafficking, focusing on organized crime, drug and weapons smuggling, and illegal immigration. The ATPI also supports the operations of local and regional governments, deploying teams of marksmen during drug-seizure operations or tactical units for high-risk tasks, and can act as riot units in a serious threat to the public order. The ATPI is the escort service for the Minister of Economy and Finance. The unit is trained in the liberation of hostages, and has operated in missions abroad.

== Organization ==
The ATPI is divided into 10-person operating teams, headed by a marshal.

== Training ==
Guardia di Finanza soldiers qualify for the ATPI after passing a course. The 10-week training course, which is physically and psychologically demanding, is held at the Guardia di Finanza barracks in Orvieto. The course includes training in police techniques necessary to combat public-order crime, escorting, police administration, and marksmanship. Techniques taught are:

- Personal defense and martial arts
- Police and dynamic shooting
- Burglary and hostage release
- Safety stock maintenance
- Fast and armored-car driving
- Guerrilla and anti-guerrilla techniques
- Police techniques

== Weapons ==
Name	Country of origin	Type
Beretta 92FS	Italy	Semi-automatic pistol
Beretta PM12	Italy	Submachine gun
Heckler & Koch MP5	Germany	Submachine gun
Beretta AR70/90	Italy	Assault rifle
Franchi SPAS-12	Italy	Combat shotgun; can be armed with non-lethal ammunition (rubber bullets)
Mauser SP86	Germany	Sniper rifle
Heckler & Koch PSG-1	Germany	Sniper rifle
Sako TRG	Finland	Sniper rifle

== Vehicles ==
Vehicles in ATPI service are identical to those of the Guardia di Finanza. They include the Alfa Romeo 156, Alfa Romeo 159, Fiat Punto, Fiat Bravo, Iveco Daily, Mitsubishi Pajero, and the Subaru Forester armored vehicle.

== Known domestic missions ==
- June–October 1988, Reggio Calabria, Operation Vespri Siciliani: ATPI officers from all departments in the area were activated as part of a broader strategy to consolidate state presence in Sicily in the aftermath of an attack which killed a judge and several others.
- 1992, Bari: 25 officers from the 3rd ATPI Napoli Company supported territorial departments in an anti-smuggling operation ordered by Finance Minister Rino Formica.
- 1987–1994: four ATPI officers from the 3rd Napoli Company were used in Rome to protect the President of the Constitutional Court.
- February–June 1994, Villa Literno, Caserta: 25 ATPI officers from the 3rd Como company, based in Lavena Ponte Tresa, and five from the 4th Rome Company participated in anti-smuggling activities and prevention of illegal immigration. They were subsequently deployed during the 20th G7 summit in Naples as escorts for foreign delegations and for counter-terrorism activities.
- 1996–1999, Milan, Operation Milano-Massima Sicurezza: anti-immigration and anti-smuggling activities
- 2000–2002, Apulia, Operation Spring: anti-smuggling activities
- 20–22 July 2001, Genoa: security during the 27th G8 summit
- 2003 Naples: law enforcement
- 8–10 July 2009, L'Aquila: security during the 35th G8 summit; two ATPI officers were included in the escort of American president Barack Obama.
- 26–27 May 2017, Taormina: security during the 43rd G7 summit

== Foreign operations ==
The ATPI has been used in Albania to protect members of the Guardia di Finanza who were deployed in the CAM-SEA mission. The unit was assigned to Prime Minister Giuliano Amato, and to the Italian contingent in Kosovo.

== See also ==
- Law enforcement in Italy
