= Music Box Italia =

- Country: Italy

Programming
- Language(s): Italian
- Picture format: 4:3 SDTV

Ownership
- Owner: Giglio Group Entertainment
- Sister channels: Live!

History
- Launched: 2003; 22 years ago
- Closed: 31 December 2013; 11 years ago

Links
- Website: http://www.musicbox.it/

Availability

Terrestrial
- Digital: No longer available

Music Box was an Italian music television channel, carried in Italy on SKY Italia.

== History ==
Launched in 2003 as a free-to-air channel on the Hot Bird satellite and broadcast in the TIMB 2 mux, Music Box has been part of Sky Italia's pay-TV channels since April 1, 2007, positioning itself on channel 717 of the Sky Box, moving on to the number 703.

Sara Caruso, Guenda Goria, Gianni Sodano and Andrea C Ravallese were chosen as the first correspondents of Music Box directly by the audience through auditions held in Rome, Naples and Milan. Each with their own original style, spontaneity, curiosity and freshness of their age, the four chosen had the task of telling the reality seen by a twenty-year-old.

On October 5, 2005, Music Box organized and transmitted a mega-concert in collaboration with the Ministry of Health. The event was called "The Rhythm of Life". To lead it: Francesco Facchinetti, the former Miss Italy Manila Nazzaro and Andrea C Ravallese.

It was also visible on Alitalia's planes in the medium and long range and in hundreds of meeting places that spontaneously choose it as a background music video entertainment.

Music Box Italia was characterized by having the musical schedule entirely chosen by users through a special messaging service or through the website of the broadcaster. 5 seconds before the end of each video clip, the Music Box software counted all the requests received and aired the video with the highest number of votes. A tracklist of preferences also appeared on the TV screen at the same time.

The broadcaster also created a Facebook application to allow its viewers to vote for video clips, send messages, see their photos and status on live TV.

On 31 December 2013, the channel stopped broadcasting via the Sky platform.
