= Chiasso financial smuggling case =

2009 Swiss criminal case

The Chiasso financial smuggling case began on June 3, 2009, near Chiasso, Switzerland (near the Swiss/Italian border), when Sezione Operativa Territoriale di Chiasso in collaboration with officers of Italian customs/financial military police (Guardia di Finanza) detained two suspects (who appeared to be Japanese nationals in their 50s) who had attempted to enter Switzerland with a suitcase in their possession with a false bottom containing what at first appeared to be U.S. Treasury Bonds worth $134.5 billion. The two possessed 249 U.S. bonds worth $500 million each (among other securities, they also had 10 "Kennedy bonds" denominated at $1 billion each). The large denominations of the securities, along with accompanying bank documentation, was what attracted the Italian police's attention. Large denominations are not available to the general public; only nation-states handle such amounts of money.

== Investigation and determination ==
Assessment as to the authenticity of the bonds began immediately (counterfeiting of these securities was suspected). One source reported that the U.S. Securities and Exchange Commission had been requested to verify the authenticity of the bonds.

On June 18, 2009, the Financial Times reported that the Italian police and the U.S. Secret Service had concluded that "the bills and accompanying bank documents were most probably counterfeit, the latest handiwork of the Italian Mafia." Col. Rodolfo Mecarelli, the provincial commander of the financial police in Como, said that the bonds "are made of filigree paper of excellent quality." Mckayla Braden, senior adviser for public affairs at the Bureau of Public Debt at the U.S. Treasury Department also said that this type of counterfeit bond scam "has been going on for years." The Treasury refers to such billion-dollar bonds as "Morganthaus," after the forged and often misspelled signature of Treasury Secretary Henry Morgenthau Jr. that appears on some of them.

The Financial Times also reported that the two suspects "had been released" by Italian authorities. No additional comment or elaboration from the Guardia di Finanza (Italian financial/customs military police) headquarters in Rome was available. As well, Ed Donovan, a spokesman for the United States Secret Service, has said that the “U.S. Secret Service, which polices counterfeiting of U.S. currency, is assisting Italian authorities in tracing the source of the fake bonds."

Nonetheless, Japanese authorities also remained interested in the matter. Takeshi Akamatsu, a press secretary for the Japanese foreign ministry, confirmed that the two suspects were carrying Japanese passports and had been detained and questioned by the Guardia di Finanza, but that Tokyo had not been informed of their names or whereabouts during or after their release.

== Reactions and speculation ==
There has been very little in the way of official statements regarding this case, raising concerns about who made them, dumping of U.S. debt and Italian interests.

Initial reactions to the story contemplated that, if the bonds were genuine, this case would have been the largest single act of smuggling (with respect to financial value) in recorded history. The total value of the counterfeit bonds was estimated at one percent of total U.S. GDP in 2008. The pair would also have been considered the fourth largest creditor to the U.S., ahead of the United Kingdom and just behind Russia. As well, according to Italian law failing to declare currency above 10,000 euros can be punished by fines of 40%.

== Similar incidents ==
An earlier billion-dollar bond case was recorded in 2002, when the United States Court of Appeals for the Seventh Circuit, located in Chicago, heard a case from two men who sought $100 billion from the Federal Reserve Bank of Chicago. Judge Richard Posner denounced the plaintiffs' claim as "preposterous" and listed reasons to doubt the authenticity of their bonds. However, the question for the court was not authenticity, but whether the plaintiffs had voluntarily withdrawn their claim in time to avoid summary judgment against them. The court decided that they had, and Posner warned them that attempting to bring a similar claim in the future could result in sanctions.

On September 18, 2009, a similar incident was reported by the Italian financial military police Guardia di Finanza, this time involving two Philippines nationals smuggling purported U.S. Treasury bonds valued at approximately $180 billion at Milan Malpensa Airport. Both men were detained.

On January 26, 2011, another similar incident was reported by the Italian military police Carabinieri, this time involving six smuggling U.S. Treasury bonds (valued at approximately €20 billion and said to be counterfeit) at a highway rest stop. The six are under investigation for receiving stolen goods.

On February 17, 2012, it was reported that Italian police had seized $6 trillion in counterfeit U.S. bonds. Eight Italian citizens were arrested for attempting to defraud several Swiss banks using the phony bonds as collateral for loans. They were also accused of counterfeiting bonds, credit card forgery, and loan-sharking in the Italian regions of Lombardy, Piedmont, Lazio and Basilicata.

== See also ==
- Yamashita's gold
