= David Mills financial allegations =

A series of financial allegations concerning British corporate lawyer David Mills came under investigation in 2006 by Italian authorities, who suspected him of corruptly receiving £340,000 from Silvio Berlusconi in the 1990s. As he was married at the time to Tessa Jowell, the then United Kingdom Secretary of State for Culture, Media and Sport, some newspapers termed the accusations Jowellgate.

== History ==
Jowell married Mills, an international corporate lawyer, in 1979. In the early 1990s, Mills acted for Berlusconi, then a high-profile businessman and former Prime Minister of Italy. During his work for Berlusconi, Mills received $600,000 (£340,000); the precise source of the money and the reason for its payment was under dispute, with Mills saying that the money was part of a larger amount paid indirectly to him by another Italian client, Diego Attanasio, although Attanasio denied this claim when found in London on 2 March (between custodial sentences for bribery and corruption).

Mills was investigated in Italy for money laundering and alleged tax fraud. On 10 March 2006, Italian prosecuting magistrates decided that they had sufficient evidence to ask a judge to indict Berlusconi and Mills. The judgement was appealed by Mills. On 27 October 2009, the Appeal Court upheld his first-instance trial conviction and his sentence of 4½ years prison. He confirmed that he would initiate a second and final appeal to the Italy's Supreme Court of Cassation. On 25 February 2010, the Supreme Court of Cassation (the second and last court of appeal under Italian law) annulled the conviction because the statute of limitations had expired.

== Procedural changes ==
Sir Alistair Graham, chairman of the Committee on Standards in Public Life from 2003 to 2007, said the controversy over Jowell highlighted the problem that public trust was being undermined by the way alleged misconduct by ministers was policed. He stated that he was "puzzled" by the Prime Minister's reluctance to change the rules. On 16 March 2006, Blair announced that a new independent figure would advise ministers on potential clashes between their public duties and private affairs and investigate potential breaches of the ministerial code of conduct. The Prime Minister would continue to have the final say on taking action.
