= Live! (TV channel) =

- Country: Italy

Programming
- Language(s): Italian
- Picture format: 576i (16:9 SDTV)

Ownership
- Owner: Giglio Group Entertainment
- Sister channels: Music Box

History
- Launched: 8 April 2009; 15 years ago
- Closed: 1 April 2012; 12 years ago

Links
- Website: www.sololive.it

Live! was an Italian music television channel, carried in Italy on Sky Italia. It broadcast only recorded concerts.
