= Lei (TV channel) =

- Country: Italy
- Broadcast area: Italy

Programming
- Language(s): Italian
- Picture format: 4:3 SDTV

Ownership
- Owner: Digicast

History
- Launched: January 25, 2009
- Closed: 1 July 2020 (11 years, 158 days)

Links
- Website: leiweb.it

Lei (lit. 'she') was an Italian entertainment television channel devoted to a female audiences, owned by Digicast and carried on SKY Italia.
Launched at 9:00 PM on January 25, 2009 with the film The Women, Lei's programming included films, TV series, debates and documentaries. The channel was shut down on 1 July 2020.

== Programming ==
- 30 Rock
- Afterlife
- Mistresses
- Profiler
- Socias
- Strictly Confidential
- The Bionic Woman
- The Practice
- The Real Housewives of New York City
- Veronica's Closet
