= Josef Scheungraber =

Josef Eduard Scheungraber (8 September 1918 – 22 July 2015) was a Wehrmacht Lieutenant and businessman. He received life sentences in Germany and Italy for war crimes committed in World War II.

== Military career ==
A trained carpenter, Scheungraber volunteered for the 1st Mountain Division (Wehrmacht) in Mittenwald. In World War II he fought in Poland, France, Russia, and Crete. In 1942 he received serious head injuries from a land mine in the Caucasus; following his recovery and since decorated with the Close Combat Clasp and Iron Cross I and II, he went to Italy per his wish as company commander of Mountain Engineer Battalion 818, where he was temporarily Ordnance Officer (Ordonnanzoffizier) to the supreme commander in Italy, Generalfeldmarschall Albert Kesselring. According to his own statements, he participated in the evacuation of the Monte Cassino monastery at the end of 1943 prior to the Battle of Monte Cassino.

=== War crimes ===
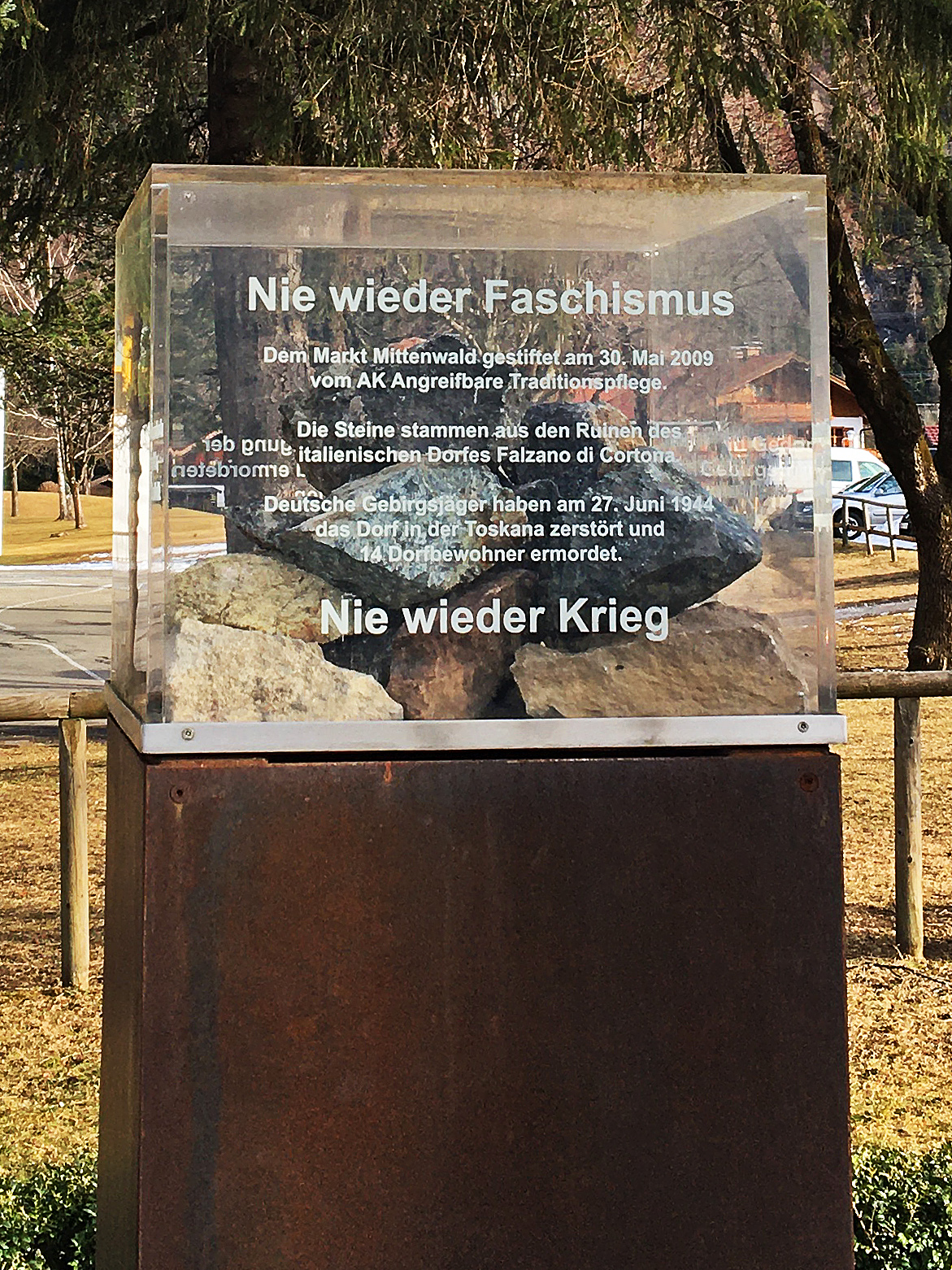
Memorial against war and fascism in Mittenwald

On 26 June 1944, an attack by partisans killed an NCO and a private. Scheungruber and the commander of the battalion gave an order to retaliate, which was carried out on the same day. Initially, a 74-year-old woman and three men were shot dead on a street at random by soldiers. Then, eleven men were captured and taken to the ground floor of a farmhouse in the village of Falzano di Cortona. The house was then dynamited, killing ten men who were 16 – 66 years of age. However, fifteen-year-old Gino Massetti survived the blast and would later give evidence against the defendant. A memorial to the victims of this war crime and to the victims of all war crimes committed by German mountain infantry (Gebirgsjäger) throughout Europe during World War II was inaugurated in Mittenwald on 21 March 2010.

== Post war ==
After the war, Scheungraber lived in Ottobrunn near Munich, where he operated a joinery and a furniture store. He was a member of the municipal council for twenty years and was made honorary commander of the fire brigade. In 2005 he was awarded the Citizen Medal for his services.

=== Prosecution ===
Investigations against Scheungraber regarding the incidents in Falzano were not initially carried out by German legal authorities. However, an Italian military court in La Spezia sentenced him in absentia to life imprisonment on 28 September 2006 and subsequently gave their files to the German authorities. As a result, he was brought to Munich 1 State Court in October 2008. On 11 August 2009, Scheungraber - who had always denied the charges - was found guilty on 10 counts of murder and was sentenced to life imprisonment in a trial expected to be one of the last Nazi war crime trials. Scheungraber was allowed to remain free while his case was appealed and, in 2011, a German court found him unable to be imprisoned "due to his deteriorating mental health," meaning that he never actually went to prison.
