= Salute! =

- Country: Italy

Ownership
- Owner: Eurodigital - Rai International

History
- Launched: 1 February 2009

Links
- Website: http://www.salute484.it/

Salute! is an Italian satellite television channel, owned by Eurodigital and broadcast by Rai International, free to air on Hot Bird 6 13°E. It is also scheduled to be broadcast in North America and Australia.

The programming is devoted to medicine, nutrition, beauty treatments and well-being issues.
