= Borders of Italy =

Political boundaries between Italy and neighboring territories

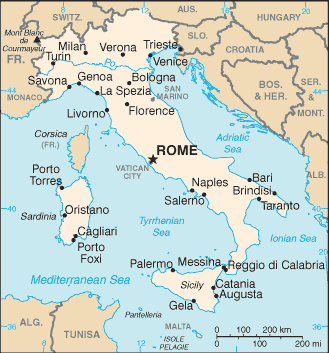
Italy and its neighboring countries

The Italian Republic has terrestrial borders with 6 sovereign states, totaling 1,937.2 kilometres (1,204 mi). In addition, Italy has maritime borders with 11 sovereign states.

== List ==
The lengths of the borders Italy shares with different countries and territories are listed below.

=== Land Borders of Italy ===
Country	Length	Bordering regions
Austria	404 km 251 mi	Trentino-Alto Adige/Südtirol; Veneto; Friuli-Venezia Giulia
France	515 km 320 mi	Liguria; Piedmont; Aosta Valley
San Marino	39 km 24 mi	Emilia-Romagna; Marche
Slovenia	232 km 144 mi	Friuli-Venezia Giulia
Switzerland	744 km 462 mi	Aosta Valley; Piedmont; Lombardy; Trentino-Alto Adige/Südtirol
Vatican City	3.2 km 2 mi	Lazio
Total	1,937.2 km 1,204 mi	

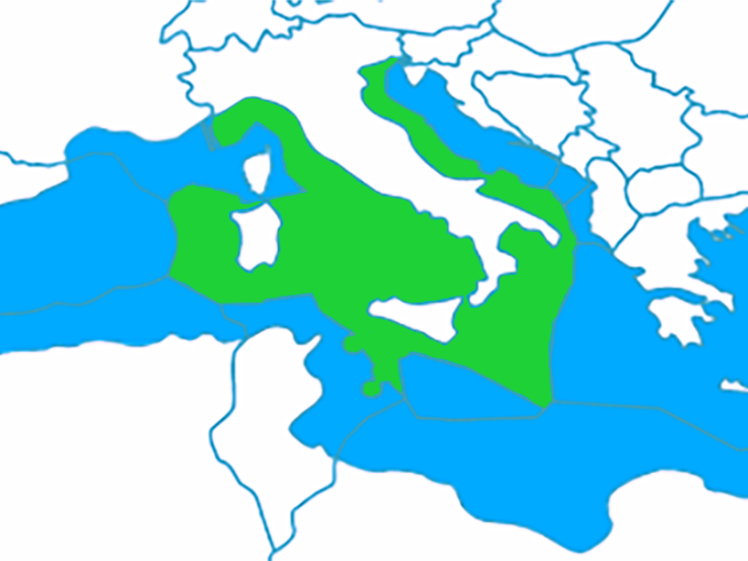
The exclusive economic zone of Italy shown in green

=== Maritime Borders of Italy ===
Country	Bordering Sea
Albania	Adriatic Sea
Algeria	Mediterranean Sea
Croatia	Adriatic Sea
France	Ligurian Sea; Tyrrhenian Sea; Mediterranean Sea
Greece	Ionian Sea
Libya	Mediterranean Sea
Malta	Mediterranean Sea
Montenegro	Adriatic Sea
Slovenia	Adriatic Sea
Spain	Mediterranean Sea
Tunisia	Mediterranean Sea

=== Enclave and exclaves ===
Name	Country	Percentage	Type	Surrounded by
Republic of San Marino	San Marino	100% (San Marino)	Enclave	Italy
Vatican City State	Vatican City	100% (Vatican City)	Enclave	Italy
Campione d'Italia	Italy	0.000889% (Italy)	Exclave	Switzerland

== See also ==
- Exclusive economic zone of Italy
- Regions of Italy
