= Eluana Englaro =

Italian woman; medical ethics case

Eluana Englaro (25 November 1970 – 9 February 2009) was an Italian woman from Lecco who entered a persistent vegetative state on 18 January 1992, following a car accident, and subsequently became the focus of a court battle between supporters and opponents of euthanasia. Shortly after her accident, medical staff began providing nutrition to Englaro with a feeding tube, but her father "fought to have her feeding tube removed", saying it would be a dignified end to his daughter's life. He said that before the crash, his daughter visited a friend who was in a coma and told him she didn't want the same thing to happen to her if she were ever in the same state." The authorities refused his request, but the decision was reversed in 2009, and she died after her nutrition was withheld after she had spent seventeen years in the persistent vegetative state.

== Trial and ruling ==
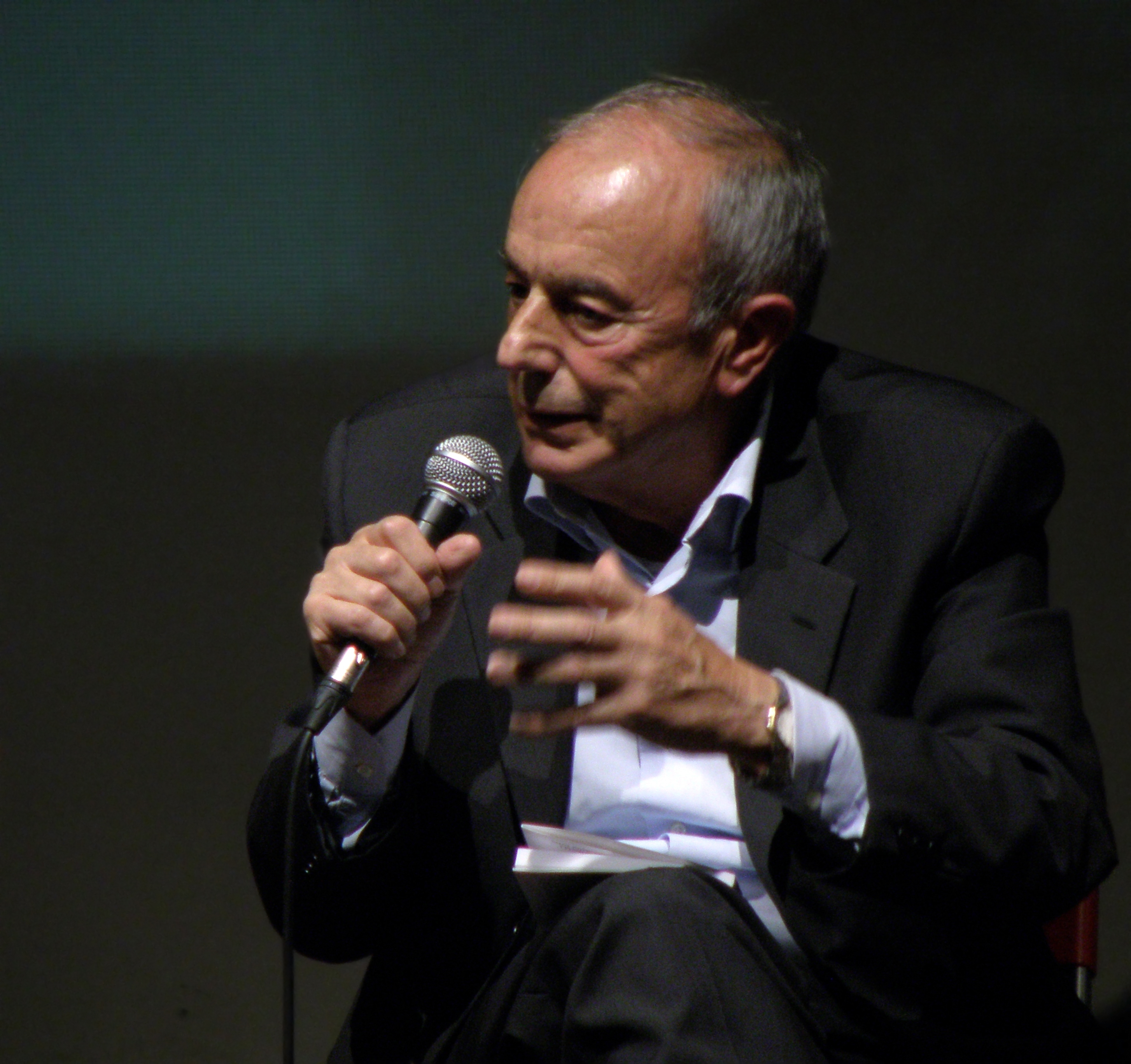
Beppino Englaro, father of Eluana

The case was debated in court and her father's request was denied both in December 1999 by the Milan Court of Appeal and in April 2005 by the Court of Cassation. A request for a new trial was granted by the Court of Cassation on 16 October 2007. The Milan Court of Appeal declared on 9 July 2008 that Eluana's father and legal guardian Beppino Englaro was allowed to suspend feeding and hydration.

Some friends of Eluana testified that she had repeatedly stated that it would be better to die than survive in conditions of complete unconsciousness. About a year before the accident that reduced her to a permanent vegetative state, Eluana was shocked by the news that a dear friend had a motorbike accident. She admitted that she had prayed that the boy could die in peace without any further suffering. Later, she discussed this with her parents and made them promise that, should something like this happen to her, they would never allow her to survive while remaining unconscious and without free will, totally dependent on the care of others.

Nuns caring for Eluana since 1994 in Lecco were willing to continue their usual charitable treatment, and they came to the point of asking the woman's father to leave the girl to them and forget her, stating that he considered his only daughter as "dead" while they considered her "alive", without referring to Eluana's convictions. Her father decided to move her to another hospital in order to have her feeding halted in accord with her previously expressed wishes.

While some opposed the Court of Appeal's decision, some demonstrated in its favour, including Radicali Italiani. In July 2008, the Italian Parliament brought a jurisdictional conflict before the Final Court of Appeal, stating that the decision was actually changing existing laws. This request was rejected by the Court. On 13 November 2008, the Supreme Court of Cassation awarded Eluana's father the right to stop his daughter from being fed. The court's decision met with immediate criticism from the Roman Catholic Church.

== Final days and death ==
Beppino Englaro, as he had stated in one of his several public appearances, waited until all appeals were concluded before he suspended the feeding of his daughter. On 2 February 2009, she was moved to a private nursing home in Udine, Friuli, and feeding was discontinued. On 6 February 2009, Prime Minister Silvio Berlusconi, after declaring that Eluana looked "healthy" and "could even give birth to a child", issued a decree that would have forced the continuation of the treatment of Eluana, and he thrust Italy into a constitutional crisis when President Giorgio Napolitano refused to sign the decree. Berlusconi stated that she had died at 19:35 (UTC+1) on 9 February 2009. An autopsy in the private nursing facility certified that her death was caused by the withholding of nutrition. It also revealed that Eluana's brain had been irreparably damaged and compromised, showing diffuse axonal injury. In addition, her lungs showed signs of degeneration.

== Opinion and reaction ==
The Catholic Church has been critical of the decision that led to Englaro's biological death. When the final judicial decision was handed down, Cardinal Ennio Antonelli, president of the Pontifical Council for the Family, objected to the ruling, citing Eluana's humanity as cause for her to be treated with dignity and that she is not a "vegetable". Prime Minister Silvio Berlusconi even stated that Eluana "looks fine and healthy" and "could even give birth to a child" despite the young woman being tetraplegic because of injuries sustained in the car accident. The reaction to Englaro's death was mixed. Rome's mayor, Gianni Alemanno, announced the Colosseum would be lit all night on 10 February to memorialize "a life that could have and should have been saved". Bioethicist Jacob M. Appel said that "mercy delayed is mercy denied" and expressed his regret that Englaro's family had to wait seventeen years to effectuate her wishes.

== See also ==
- Bioethics
- Right to life
- Right to die
- Terri Schiavo
