= Younger Brothers =

Younger Brothers may refer to:

- James-Younger Gang
- James & Michael Younger, also known as the Younger Brothers, American country music group
- The Younger Brothers, 1949 Western film directed by Edwin L. Marin, and starring Wayne Morris and Janis Paige.

== See also ==
- Brothers and Sisters (disambiguation)

- Brother (disambiguation)
- Brothers (disambiguation)
- Little Brother (disambiguation)
- Younger Brother (disambiguation)
- Big Brother (disambiguation)

- Sister (disambiguation)
- Sisters (disambiguation)
- Little Sister (disambiguation)
- Big Sister (disambiguation)
