= Big Brothers Big Sisters =

Big Brothers Big Sisters may refer to the following charitable youth mentoring programs:

- Big Brothers Big Sisters of America
  - Big Brothers Big Sisters of New York City
  - Big Brothers Big Sisters of Northern Nevada
- Big Brothers Big Sisters of Canada

== See also ==
- Big Brother (disambiguation)
- Big Sister (disambiguation)
- Brother (disambiguation)
- Brothers (disambiguation)
- Little Brother (disambiguation)
- Younger Brother (disambiguation)
- Sister (disambiguation)
- Sisters (disambiguation)
- Little Sister (disambiguation)
