= Little Brother =

Little Brother or little brother may refer to:

== Relationships ==
- Little brother, a male sibling who is younger in age - see birth order
- Little brother, a boy supported by a surrogate "big brother", through an organization such as Big Brothers Big Sisters of America

== Literature ==
- Little Brother (Baillie novel), 1985, by Allan Baillie, a children's novel about life under the Khmer Rouge
- Little Brother, 1996, a novel by David Mason
- "Little Brother" (short story), 2001, by Walter Mosley
- Little Brother (Doctorow novel), a 2008 novel by Cory Doctorow

== Religion ==
- Little Brothers of Francis, a Franciscan order in the Anglican Communion
- "Little Brother", a name for Franciscan Catholic orders
  - Little Brothers of St. Francis, a Roman Catholic institute of religious brothers
  - Little Brothers of the Lamb, a branch of a Roman Catholic religious institute, shaped both by Dominican and by Franciscan spirituality
- Little Brothers of the Good Shepherd, a Roman Catholic pontifical institute of religious brothers
- Little Brothers of the Gospel, a Roman Catholic congregation of religious brothers inspired by the life and writings of Charles de Foucauld
- Little Brothers of Jesus, a Roman Catholic religious order based on the life and teachings of Charles de Foucauld
- Little Brothers of Mary, an international community of Catholic religious institute of brothers

== Organizations ==
- International Federation of Little Brothers of the Poor, an international federation of volunteer-based non-profit organizations, committed to relieving isolation and loneliness among the elderly
  - Little Brothers – Friends of the Elderly, initially named Little Brothers of the Poor, a network of organizations located in the United States, member of the International Federation of Little Brothers of the Poor

== Ships ==
- USS Little Brothers (SP-921), a United States Navy tug in commission from 1917 to 1919

== Films and television ==
- Little Brother (1927 film), a Soviet film directed by Grigori Kozintsev and Leonid Trauberg
- Little Brother (2014 film), a Canadian film directed by Rémi St-Michel
- Little Brother (2023 film), an American film directed by Sheridan O'Donnell
- Little Brother (2026 film), an American comedy film directed by Matt Spicer
- "Little Brother" (Adventure Time), a 2014 TV episode

== Music ==
- ARP Little Brother, a keyboardless monophonic synthesizer expander module
- Little Brother Montgomery (1906–1985), blues pianist
- Little Brother (group), a hip-hop group from North Carolina, USA

=== Albums ===
- Little Brother (EP) (2008), by punk band Dead to Me

=== Songs ===
- "Little Brother," a song from Neil Sedaka's 1974 album Sedaka's Back
- "Little Brother," a song from David Knopfler's 1983 album Release
- "Little Brother", a song from Grizzly Bear's 2006 album Yellow House
- "Little Brother", a song from The Future Sound of London's 1994 album Lifeforms
- "Little Brother", a song by Black Star for the 1999 film The Hurricane

== See also ==
- "Little Bother", a 2022 song by King Princess featuring Fousheé
- Brothers and Sisters (disambiguation)

- Brother (disambiguation)
- Brothers (disambiguation)
- Little Brother (disambiguation)
- Younger Brother (disambiguation)
- Big Brother (disambiguation)

- Sister (disambiguation)
- Sisters (disambiguation)
- Little Sister (disambiguation)
- Big Sister (disambiguation)
