= Brothers (disambiguation) =

Brothers are male siblings.

Brothers may also refer to:

== Film ==
- Brothers (1913 film), an American silent film directed by D. W. Griffith
- Brothers (1929 American film), a film directed by Scott Pembroke
- Brothers (1929 German film), a silent film directed by Werner Hochbaum
- Brothers (1930 film), an American film directed by Walter Lang
- Brothers (1935 film), a Chinese film of the 1930s
- Brothers (1977 film), an American drama film directed by Arthur Barron
- Brothers (1982 film), an Australian war drama directed by Terry Bourke
- Brothers (2004 film), a Danish film
- Brothers (2004 Chinese film), a Chinese film starring Roy Cheung
- Brothers (2007 film), a Hong Kong film starring Andy Lau, Michael Miu, and Eason Chan
- Brothers (2009 film), a American film starring Tobey Maguire and Jake Gyllenhaal, based on the Danish film
- Brothers (2012 film), a Telugu Indian film, a dubbed version of Tamil film Maattrraan
- Brothers (2015 film), a Hindi film, a remake of the film Warrior
- Brothers (2016 film), a Chinese war action drama film
- Brothers (2017 adventure film), a Dutch film
- Brothers (2017 drama film), a Dutch film
- Brothers (2023 film), a Czech action drama
- Brothers (2024 film), an American comedy film directed by Max Barbakow

== Literature ==
- Brothers (Goldman novel), a 1986 novel by William Goldman
- Brothers (Yu novel), a novel by the Chinese author Yu Hua
- "Brothers" (Dickson), a short story by Gordon R. Dickson
- Brothers (manga), a manga written by Eiji Otsuka and illustrated by Shou Tajima
- Brothers: The Hidden History of the Kennedy Years, a non-fiction book by David Talbot

== Music ==
=== Albums ===
- Brothers (The Black Keys album), 2010
- Brothers (Take 6 album), 1996
- Brothers (1977 soundtrack), by Taj Mahal, from the 1977 film (see above)
- Brothers (2009 soundtrack), by Thomas Newman, from the 2009 film (see above)
- Santana Brothers or Brothers, a 1994 album by Carlos Santana, Jorge Santana, and Carlos Hernandez

=== Songs ===
- "Brothers" (Dean Brody song)
- "Brothers" (Gang of Youths song)
- "Brothers" (Kanye West song)
- "Brothers" (Lil Tjay song)
- "Brothers" (Ola song)
- "Brothers", by Brand New
- "Brothers", by Deutsch Amerikanische Freundschaft from 1st Step to Heaven
- "Brothers", by Kid Cudi from Indicud
- "Brothers", by Tiga from Sexor
- "Brothers", by Yngwie Malmsteen from The Seventh Sign

=== Performers ===
- Brothers (rappers), an Australian rap duo consisting of Issam and Bassam Ahmad
- The Brothers, a Dutch duo made up of brothers Dean Saunders and Ben Saunders
- Brothers (band), a Norwegian funk rock band

== Television ==
=== Series ===
- Brothers (1984 TV series), an American sitcom on Showtime
- Brothers TV, a 2004 Canadian sketch comedy show on Access and OUTtv
- Brothers (2009 TV series), an American sitcom on Fox
- Ang Probinsyano (international title: Brothers), a 2015–2022 Philippine drama action series
- Brothers (2026 TV series), an American comedy series starring Matthew McConaughey and Woody Harrelson

=== Episodes ===
- "Brothers" (Doctors), 2005
- "Brothers" (King & Conqueror), 2025
- "Brothers" (Star Trek:The Next Generation), 1990
- "Brothers" (Star Wars: The Clone Wars), 2012
- "Brothers" (Ugly Betty), 2007

== People ==
- Brothers (surname)

== Organizations ==
- Brother (Christian), a member of a monastic religious order
- Friars, members of one of the mendicant orders
- Brothers, members of a fraternity
- Brothers, male members of the Rainbow Family

== Sports ==
- Brothers Old Boys, an Australian rugby union team
- CTBC Brothers, a Taiwanese professional baseball team
- Past Brothers, an Australian rugby league team

== Other uses ==
- Brothers (comics), comic book characters from Amalgam Comics
- Brothers (ferry), a 19th-century Manly-to-Sydney ferry in Australia
- Brothers, Oregon, an unincorporated community in the United States
- Brothers Cider, a brand of cider made in England
- Brothers: A Tale of Two Sons, an adventure video game
- Brothers (HBC vessel), see Hudson's Bay Company vessels

== See also ==
- The Brothers (disambiguation)
- Blood Brothers (disambiguation)
- Bros (disambiguation)
- Birth order
- Brothers and Sisters (disambiguation)

- Brother (disambiguation)
- Brothers (disambiguation)
- Little Brother (disambiguation)
- Younger Brother (disambiguation)
- Big Brother (disambiguation)

- Sister (disambiguation)
- Sisters (disambiguation)
- Little Sister (disambiguation)
- Big Sister (disambiguation)
