= Brother (disambiguation) =

A brother is a male sibling.

Brother may also refer to:

== Arts and entertainment ==
=== Film and television ===
- Brother (1997 film), a Russian crime film
- Brother (2000 film), a film directed by Takeshi Kitano
- Brother (2022 film), a Canadian film directed by Clement Virgo
- Brother (2024 Indian film), an Indian Tamil-language film directed by M. Rajesh
- Brother (2024 Polish film), a Polish film
- "Brother" (Star Trek: Discovery), a television episode

=== Music ===
==== Record labels ====
- Brother Records, the Beach Boys' record label

==== Groups ====
- Brother (Australian band), a Celtic-roots rock group
- Brother (Canadian band), a rock band from Winnipeg, Manitoba
- Viva Brother, originally Brother, an English rock band

==== Albums ====
- Brother (Boyzone album), 2010
- Brother (The Brilliance album) or the title song, 2015
- Brother (Lon & Derrek Van Eaton album), 1972
- Brother (Morten Harket album) or the title song, 2014
- Brother (The Scene Aesthetic album), 2010
- Brother, by Cry of Love, 1993

==== Songs ====
- "Brother" (Alice in Chains song), 1992
- "Brother" (Kodaline song), 2017
- "Brother" (Little Birdy song), 2009
- "Brother" (Matt Corby song), 2011
- "Brother" (Needtobreathe song), 2015
- "Brother" (Pearl Jam song), 2003
- "Brother" (Saul song), 2019
- "Brother" (Smashproof song), 2009
- "Brother", by Amy Winehouse from Frank, 2003
- "Brother", by Ben Haenow from Ben Haenow, 2015
- "Brother", by Brett Eldredge from Brett Eldredge, 2017
- "Brother", by Dark New Day from Twelve Year Silence, 2005
- "Brother (On the Line)", by Dave Alvin from Romeo's Escape, 1987
- "Brother", by Falling in Reverse from Just Like You, 2015
- "Brother", by Funeral for a Friend from Chapter and Verse, 2015
- "Brother", by Jorge Ben from A Tábua de Esmeralda, 1974
- "Brother", by the Kinks from Sleepwalker, 1977
- "Brother", by M.I from The Chairman, 2014
- "Brother", by Murder by Death from In Bocca al Lupo, 2006
- "Brother", by Orphaned Land from All Is One, 2013
- "Brother", by Ronnie Radke, 2014
- "Brother", by Stereophonics from Language. Sex. Violence. Other?, 2005
- "Brother", by Steve Vai from Fire Garden, 1996
- "Brother", by Toad the Wet Sprocket from In Light Syrup, 1995
- "Brother", by X Ambassadors from Love Songs Drug Songs, 2013
- "Brother", by Mac DeMarco from Salad Days, 2014

=== Other uses in arts and entertainment ===
- Brother (Final Fantasy X), a character in the video game Final Fantasy X
- Brother (manga), a Japanese manga
- Brother, a character from the television and book series Berenstain Bears

== Roles and titles ==
=== Religion ===
- Friar or Brother, a member of one of the mendicant orders
- Religious brother, a member of a Christian religious order

=== Other titles ===
- Brother, a member of a fraternity in North American colleges
- Brother, a term of address for a male member of the Rainbow Family

== Other uses ==
- Brother Industries, a Japanese manufacturing company
- Brother Island (disambiguation)
- Brother Moth or Raphia frater, a moth of the family Noctuidae

== See also ==
- African Americans
- Birth order
- Brother Island (disambiguation), various islands around the world
- Frater (disambiguation)
- Hermano (disambiguation)
- Bro (disambiguation)
- Brothers and Sisters (disambiguation)

- Brother (disambiguation)
- Brothers (disambiguation)
- Little Brother (disambiguation)
- Younger Brother (disambiguation)
- Big Brother (disambiguation)

- Sister (disambiguation)
- Sisters (disambiguation)
- Little Sister (disambiguation)
- Big Sister (disambiguation)
