= Sisters (disambiguation) =

Sisters are female siblings.

Sisters or The Sisters may also refer to:

== Geographical locations ==
- Sisters Islands (disambiguation), several island groups with the name
- Sisters, Oregon, a city in the United States
- The Sisters (Alaska), a mountain in the United States
- The Sisters, Victoria, a settlement in Australia
- Sisters Creek (disambiguation)
- Sisters Olive Trees of Noah, an olive grove in Lebanon

== Art ==
- The Sisters (Collinson), a 19th-century painting by James Collinson
- The Sisters (Thayer), an 1884 painting by Abbott Handerson Thayer

== Film ==
- The Sisters (1914 film), an American film starring Lillian Gish
- Sisters (1922 film), an American drama film directed by Albert Capellani
- Sisters (1930 film), an American drama film directed by James Flood
- The Sisters (1938 film), featuring Bette Davis and Errol Flynn
- Sisters (1972 film), an American psychological horror directed by Brian de Palma
- The Sisters (1957 film), a Soviet film of 1957
- The Sisters (1969 film), a South Korean film starring Nam Jeong-im
- Sisters, a 1998 documentary by Fintan Connolly
- Sisters (2001 film), a Russian crime film
- The Sisters (2004 film), a Thai film
- Sisters (2005), also known as Hermanas, a drama film
- The Sisters (2005 film), an American film based on a play by Richard Alfieri, inspired by Chekhov's play The Three Sisters
- Sisters (2006 film), a 2006 independent horror film
- The Sisters (2011 film), a 2011 Serbian film
- Sisters (2015 film), an American comedy film directed by Jason Moore
- Sisters (2019 film), a Thai action horror film directed by Prachya Pinkaew
- Sisters (2024 film), an American comedy film directed by Susie Yankou

== Literature ==
- The Sisters (play), a 1642 comedy by James Shirley
- The Sisters: A Domestic Tale, a 1813 novel by Barbara Hofland
- The Sisters, a 1821 novel by Alicia Moore, also known as Rosalind and Felicia; or, The Sisters
- The Sisters; or, England and France, an 1843 novel by Henry Cockton
- The Sisters; or, Wake in Woe, an 1861 story in verse by Aubrey Thomas de Vere
- The Sisters (German: Die Schwestern), an 1880 novel by Georg Ebers
- The Sisters, an 1892 verse drama by Algernon Charles Swinburne
- Sisters, a 1904 novel by Ada Cambridge
- "The Sisters" (short story), a 1904 story by James Joyce
- The Sisters, a 1908 novel by Mabel Dearmer
- The Sisters, a 1914 play by Harold Clarke Goddard
- Sisters, a 1919 novel by Kathleen Thompson Norris
- Sisters, a 1928 novel by Grace May North
- The Sisters, a 1948 novel by Anne Meredith
- Sisters, a 1972 novel by Andrew Neiderman
- The Sisters, a 1979 novel by Laurence Meynell
- Sisters (Lynne Cheney novel), a 1981 novel by Lynne Cheney
- Sisters, a 1984 novel by Suzanne Goodwin
- The Sisters, a 1986 novel by Robert Littell
- Sisters, a 1986 novel by Claire Rayner
- The Sisters, a 1987 novel by Pat Booth
- Sisters, a 1987–1989 young adult novel series by Marilyn Kaye
- "Sisters", a short story by Greg Bear, featured in his 1989 collection Tangents
- Sisters, a 1991 novel by Lisa Gregory
- Sisters, a 1993 anthology edited by Drusilla Modjeska
- Sisters, a 1996 omnibus of three novels by Anita Bunkley, Sandra Kitt and Eva Rutland
- Full House Sisters, a 1998–2001 book series based on the TV series Full House, which ran for a total of fourteen installments
- Sisters (Steel novel), a 2007 novel by Danielle Steel
- Sisters (graphic novel), a 2014 autobiographical graphic novel by Raina Telgemeier
- Sisters, the 1921–1922 first novel in the trilogy The Road to Calvary by Aleksey Nikolayevich Tolstoy
- The Sisters, a play by Richard Alfieri

== Music ==
=== Groups ===
- S!sters, a German vocal duo that represented Germany in the Eurovision Song Contest 2019
- The Sisters, an Indonesian vocal duo consisting of Shireen Sungkar and Zaskia Sungkar

=== Albums and EPs ===
- The Sisters (album), a 1982 album by Sister Sledge
- Sisters (The Bluebells album), 1984
- Sisters (Sweethearts of the Rodeo album), 1992
- The Sisters EP, by Pulp, 1994
- Sisters (A-Mei album), 1996
- Sisters (Idoling album), 2011

=== Songs ===
- "Sisters" (song), a 1954 Irving Berlin song in the film White Christmas
- "Sisters", a song by Sparks from Pulling Rabbits Out of a Hat
- "Sisters", a song by Steve Vai from Passion and Warfare
- "The Sisters", a song by Renaissance from Novella

== Television ==
=== Series ===
- Sisters (American TV series), a TV drama series which ran on NBC from 1991 to 1996
- Rod Santiago's The Sisters, a 2011 Philippine television drama
- Sisters (Australian TV series), 2017 Australian drama series
- Sisters (2023 TV series), 2023 Irish/Canadian comedy drama series

=== Episodes ===
- "Sisters" (Once Upon a Time), 2016
- "Sisters" (Roseanne), 1995
- "Sisters" (Teen Titans), 2003
- "The Sisters" (Danger Man), 1960
- "The Sisters" (The Golden Girls), 2016

== See also ==
- Brothers and Sisters (disambiguation)

- Brother (disambiguation)
- Brothers (disambiguation)
- Little Brother (disambiguation)
- Younger Brother (disambiguation)
- Big Brother (disambiguation)

- Sister (disambiguation)
- Sisters (disambiguation)
- Little Sister (disambiguation)
- Big Sister (disambiguation)
