= Younger brother (disambiguation) =

A younger brother is a male individual who has at least one older sibling.

Younger brother or variants may also refer to:

- Younger Brother, British music group
- Younger Brother, a term used by a native community of northern Colombia known as the Koguis
- Younger Brethren, a group within the British organisation Trinity House
- Younger Brother (film), a 1953 Spanish drama film

== See also ==
- Younger Brothers (disambiguation)
- Junior Brother, Irish folk singer
- Brothers and Sisters (disambiguation)

- Brother (disambiguation)
- Brothers (disambiguation)
- Little Brother (disambiguation)
- Younger Brother (disambiguation)
- Big Brother (disambiguation)

- Sister (disambiguation)
- Sisters (disambiguation)
- Little Sister (disambiguation)
- Big Sister (disambiguation)
