= Weird Sisters (disambiguation) =

The Weird Sisters are characters in William Shakespeare's play Macbeth.

Weird Sisters may also refer to:

- Weird Sisters (Gargoyles), fairy characters in Gargoyles
- The Weird Sisters (Harry Potter), a fictional rock band in the Harry Potter series
- The Weird Sisters (novel), a book by Eleanor Brown
- Weird Sisters, nickname of the fictional Brides of Dracula
- The Three Weird Sisters, a 1948 British film
- Three Weird Sisters (band), a filk band based in Atlanta, Georgia
- The Weird Sisters, Prudence, Agatha & Dorcas, characters from Chilling Adventures of Sabrina.

== See also ==
- Wyrd Sisters, a Discworld novel by Terry Pratchett
- Wyrd Sisters (band), a Canadian folk group
- Wayward Sisters (disambiguation)
- Sister (disambiguation)
- Weird (disambiguation)
