= Wayward Sisters =

Wayward Sisters or wayward sister may refer to:

- The Three Witches from William Shakespeare's play Macbeth
- "Wayward Sisters", a 2018 U.S. TV episode of the 13th season of Supernatural
- Wayward Sisters (TV series), a cancelled spin-off TV series of Supernatural
- "Wayward Sister" (song), an aria from the opera Dido and Aeneas, by Henry Purcell; see List of compositions by Henry Purcell

== See also ==
- Sister (disambiguation)
- Weird Sisters (disambiguation)
- Wayward (comics)
- Wayward (film)
- Wayward (novel)
- Hunter: The Reckoning – Wayward
