= Big Brother: Over the Top =

American reality television series

- Also known as: BBOTT
- Genre: Reality competition
- Created by: John de Mol Jr.
- Based on: Big Brother by John de Mol Jr.
- Directed by: Jim Tanker
- Presented by: Julie Chen
- Starring: Various HouseGuests
- Voices of: Don Wollman
- Narrated by: Clayton A.S. Halsey
- Theme music composer: David Vanacore; Ken Berry
- Country of origin: United States
- Original language: English
- No. of seasons: 1
- No. of episodes: 10

Production
- Executive producers: Allison Grodner; Rich Meehan; Chris Roach
- Producer: Matt Richmond
- Production location: Studio City, California
- Editors: Marc Cahill; Jules Frazier; Clayton A.S. Halsey; Chris W. Hill; David Dewey Kim; Sean McGinty; Jimmy Miller; Myron Santos; Bryan Szot; Paul Withers; Dannika Lister
- Camera setup: Multi-camera
- Running time: 40–96 minutes
- Production companies: Our House Productions, Inc.; Fly on the Wall Entertainment; Endemol Shine North America

Original release
- Network: CBS All Access
- Release: September 28 – December 1, 2016

Related
- Big Brother (American TV series)

Big Brother: Over the Top (also known as BBOTT) is a spin-off American reality television series of the show Big Brother that aired exclusively online. The show premiered on September 28, 2016, and ended after 65 days with a season finale on December 1, 2016, only on CBS All Access, an over-the-top subscription streaming service. The spin-off was officially announced by CBS on August 3, 2016, while Big Brother 18 was still in progress.

As with the televised series, the group of contestants—referred to as HouseGuests—are enclosed in the Big Brother House under constant surveillance of cameras and microphones. Each week a HouseGuest was evicted until the final three HouseGuests remain on finale night. Unlike in Big Brother, the viewers voted to crown a winner. Julie Chen hosted the season premiere and finale and conduct weekly eviction interviews. In the season finale, the voting public awarded Morgan Willett with the $250,000 grand prize over Jason Roy from Big Brother 17 and Kryssie Ridolfi.

What separated this from the main televised series was that the live feed was emphasised in this series, with significantly less feed blockage. For example, the live feed showed the house guests moving in and meeting one another, something that had never been shown live or unedited. Additionally, viewers got to see all the games's ceremonies and competitions from start to finish, which are rarely shown on the live feed for the main series, save for occasional Endurance competitions. Additionally, the involvement of the viewers was greatly increased, with several regular weekly “America's Vote” voting occurring each week.

== Format ==
The format of this season varied slightly from previous seasons that have aired on CBS. The contestants referred to as "HouseGuests" are sequestered in the Big Brother House with no contact to or from the outside world. Each week, the HouseGuests take part in several challenges that determine who will win food, luxuries and power in the house.

- Head of Household (HoH): At the start of each week in the house, the HouseGuests compete for the title of Head of Household, often shortened to simply HoH. The Head of Household for each week is given luxuries such as their own personal bedroom and the use of an MP3 player, but is responsible for nominating two of their fellow HouseGuests for eviction. The Head of Household would not be able to compete in the following week's Head of Household competition; this excludes the final Head of Household competition of the season.
- Power of Veto (PoV): After the nominees are determined, the Power of Veto competition is played. Each the reigning HoH and the nominees are guaranteed to play with the remaining slots being given to other HouseGuests selected by random draw. The Veto holder wins the right to either revoke the nomination of one of the nominated HouseGuests or leave them as is. If a HouseGuest chooses to exercise the Power of Veto, the Head of Household is responsible for naming a replacement nominee. The holder of the Power of Veto is safe from being nominated as the replacement nominee.
- Eviction: On eviction night, all HouseGuests must vote to evict one of the nominees, with the exception of the nominees and the Head of Household. The eviction vote is by secret ballot, with HouseGuests casting their votes orally in the Diary Room. In the event of a tied vote, the Head of Household will cast a tie-breaking vote publicly. The nominee with the majority of the votes is evicted from the house.

=== Changes in format ===
==== Safety Ceremony ====
The Nomination Ceremony from the broadcast edition was replaced with the new Safety Ceremony. This ceremony took place over two days, with two separate ceremonies. During the ceremony, the HoH was sequestered in the HoH room while the other HouseGuests were downstairs with their "Block Pass". When instructed by Big Brother, the HoH activated the "Block Pass" of a HouseGuest of their choosing. This made the pass illuminate green, indicating that the HouseGuest is safe from nominations.

The first ceremony takes place on Saturday night, with the HoH being instructed to save a predetermined number of HouseGuests. The second ceremony takes place on Sunday night, with the HoH being instructed to save all but two of the remaining non-safe HouseGuests. The HouseGuests who do not have their "Block Pass" activated at the end of the second ceremony are the HoH's two nominees.

==== America's Vote ====
This edition featured greater participation from the viewing public than the broadcast edition. Each week, the American public was given several opportunities to affect the game:

- America's Nominee: Each week, the viewers voted on a third nominee who was nominated with the HoH's nomination. No HouseGuest can be nominated by America in back-to-back weeks, and if America's Nominee is vetoed, no replacement nominee will be named, with only the HoH's two nominees facing the eviction vote.
- America's Eviction Vote: Each week, the viewers voted between the nominated HouseGuests for who should be evicted. This vote counted as one eviction vote and would be tallied with the HouseGuest's eviction votes. As with all eviction votes, the result of America's Eviction Vote would not be revealed to the HouseGuests.
- America's Care Package: Each week, the viewers voted to give one HouseGuest per week a special power or "care package". This twist was first seen on Big Brother 18.
- America's Have-Nots: Each week, the viewers voted for three HouseGuests to be the Have-Nots of the week.
- America's Winner: For the first time since Big Brother 1, the viewers voted for the winner among the three finalists, meaning that there would be no jury of evicted HouseGuests.

== HouseGuests ==
The cast of Big Brother: Over the Top. Top: Neeley, Alex, Jason, Whitney, Shelby, Danielle, Cornbread, Morgan and Kryssie Bottom: Scott, Monte, Shane and Justin

12 of the 13 HouseGuests were announced on September 26, 2016, including a pair of sisters, Alex and Morgan Willett. The 13th HouseGuest was announced to be returnee from the original series. Two HouseGuests were voted on by the public and Jason Roy from Big Brother 17 was chosen to re-enter the house.

Name	Age	Occupation	Residence	Result
Morgan Willett	22	Publicist	Austin, Texas	Winner; Day 65
Jason Roy Big Brother 17	27	Supermarket cashier	Swansea, Massachusetts	Runner-up; Day 65
Krystina "Kryssie" Ridolfi	31	Waitress	Schaumburg, Illinois	Third Place; Day 65
Justin Duncan	27	Restaurant owner	New Orleans, Louisiana	Evicted; Day 63
Shelby Stockton	24	Law school graduate	Simi Valley, California	Evicted; Day 57
Danielle Lickey	23	Preschool teacher	Visalia, California	Evicted; Day 50
Whitney Hogg	21	Medical assistant	Whitesburg, Kentucky	Evicted; Day 43
Alex Willett	25	Animation designer	Dallas, Texas	Evicted; Day 43
Scott Dennis	24	Debt collector	Bangor, Maine	Evicted; Day 36
Neeley Jackson	33	Sales associate	Fort Worth, Texas	Evicted; Day 29
Shane Chapman	24	Roofer	Pisgah Forest, North Carolina	Evicted; Day 22
Monte Massongill	25	Engineer associate	Olive Branch, Mississippi	Evicted; Day 15
Michael "Cornbread" Ligon	41	Foreman	Augusta, Georgia	Evicted; Day 8

=== Other potential HouseGuest ===
The final 13th HouseGuest was chosen by a public vote between two HouseGuests from the broadcast version: Jason Roy from Big Brother 17 and Jozea Flores from Big Brother 18. Overall, Jason was chosen over Jozea.

Name	Age on entry	Occupation	Residence
Jozea Flores Big Brother 18	26	Make-up artist	Los Angeles, California

== Episodes ==
No.	Title	Day(s)	Original release date
1	"Big Brother: Over the Top - Episode 1"	Days 1–8	October 5, 2016
Twelve new HouseGuests entered the Big Brother house: Scott, Morgan, Shane, Neeley, Shelby, Cornbread, Kryssie, Whitney, Justin, Alex, Monte and Danielle. Jason, from Big Brother 17 was voted into the House by America as the thirteenth HouseGuest over Jozea from Big Brother 18. During introductions, Shelby withheld that she was a law school graduate, while Alex and Morgan were shocked seeing each other in the House. Julie Chen revealed that America would impact the game unlike ever before and explained there would be no Jury of evicted HouseGuests to determine the winner instead the viewing public will vote for the winner. Jason began to notice the facial similarities between Alex and Morgan. Discussions of a possible early alliance between Monte, Shane, Scott and Cornbread occurred in the London bedroom during the first night. During their second day in the House, everyone took part in the first Head of Household competition of the season.: Head of Household ("The BB Bug"): A strange bottle with a blue liquid was placed in the living room with a note "only one may drink." Shane volunteered to drink it and was soon told by Big Brother that he was infected and had to go to the Diary Room. Upon his return, the HouseGuests were under quarantine in the competition and alarms would blast over the next 24 hours. When the first alarm goes off, Shane must infect another HouseGuest, thus eliminating them from the competition. The next HouseGuest must infect a new HouseGuest at the next alarm and so on. The last HouseGuest standing will be the first Head of Household. Monte became the first Head of Household of the season.; The following day, Julie announced to the HouseGuests instead of nomination ceremonies, there will be safety ceremonies. When instructed, the HoH has to save a variable number of HouseGuests to be safe. The two HouseGuests who are not safe will be the nominees of the week. Monte's first instinct was to go after Jason. After the Safety Ceremony, it was revealed that Jason and Danielle were the first nominees on Day 4. Later on in the night, Big Brother called the HouseGuests to the living room. There Julie informed the HouseGuests the viewers will choose a third nominee to sit beside Danielle and Jason. Cornbread was announced as the third nominee chosen by America on Day 5 then Whitney and Alex were chosen to play in the Power of Veto competition while Shane was chosen to host the competition.: Power of Veto ("Veto Vault"): Inside the house, there are clues to unlocking a vault that's in the backyard. If a HouseGuest thinks they found the 4-digit code they have to run into line outside and wait for their turn to try to unlock the vault. If they get it wrong the vault will buzz incorrect and if they get it right it will buzz correct unlocking the vault and the power of veto. After one hour everyone will get a clue. Jason unlocked the vault with the code 2449 and won the Power of Veto.; Subsequently on Day 7, Jason used the Veto to save himself, and Monte chose to name Kryssie as the replacement nominee. Big Brother called the HouseGuests to the living room again where Julie explained the third interactive element of the season. She informed the HouseGuests that this season America will not only be nominating but evicting a HouseGuest from the house. The nominee that gets the most votes from America will get an extra eviction vote added onto them. As all votes are private, it will not be revealed who America voted to evict. On Day 8, Cornbread was the first person to be evicted from the House by a vote of 9-1-0 with Alex being the only vote against Danielle.
2	"Big Brother: Over the Top - Episode 2"	Days 8–15	October 12, 2016
Shortly after the eviction the HouseGuests were instructed to go to the backyard for the next Head of Household competition. Monte, as outgoing Head of Household, was not eligible to compete.: Head of Household ("Live by the Sword"): Each HouseGuest had a sword, a crown, and knight with their face on it. When the competition begins everyone has two minutes to get their crown pressed against their knights head with the sword. If they do not achieve this by the two-minute mark, they are eliminated. After the two-minute mark, if the crown falls they are also out. When they reach an hour, they will be forced to hold their sword with one hand. They are also not allowed to hold their sword beyond the handle. The last HouseGuest standing becomes the new Head of Household. After an intense battle, Alex outlasted Neeley and became the new Head of Household.; Two days later, the HouseGuests were informed of America's Care Package, where a HouseGuest would receive a special predetermined power from America. It was then revealed that Kryssie won the Save-A-Friend power, which would allow her to keep one other houseguest of her choice safe for the week. She chose to save Jason. On Days 11 and 12, two safety ceremonies took place, with Alex ultimately nominating Danielle and Shane, the showmance. Before the Power of Veto competition on Day 13, it was made known that America's Nominee was Monte. Jeff Schroeder from Big Brother 11 and Big Brother 13 then arrived at the house as the Veto Host, where Alex, Monte, Shane, Danielle, Scott and Shelby competed for the Power of Veto.: Power of Veto ("Veto Fore Sale"): Taking turns, each HouseGuest putted at an oversized golf course, scoring points according to the difficulty of the hole that they scored in. After gaining a certain number of points, they could then redeem different punishments, as well as the Power of Veto at the highest required score of 60. The competition would continue until all six prizes had been redeemed, with the last prize remaining going to the last HouseGuest to redeem a prize. Shane won the Power of Veto, with Shelby winning the punishment of wearing a caddy costume for the week, Danielle winning a punishment of fetching golf balls from the swimming pool at random times throughout the week, Alex winning a handicap for the next Head of Household competition, Scott winning a punishment of having to lie in a sand pit for 24 hours, with the exception of using the bathroom, and Monte was not allowed to play for the next Veto competition.; The next day, Shane decided to use the Power of Veto on himself, and Alex chose Kryssie as the replacement nominee. On Day 15, Monte was evicted from the Big Brother house by a vote of 5-4-0, with America casting the deciding vote to evict.
3	"Big Brother: Over the Top - Episode 3"	Days 15–22	October 19, 2016
After the eviction, the HouseGuests headed to the backyard for the next Head of Household competition, where Alex, as outgoing HoH, would not compete.: Head of Household ("BB Bar Code"): Each HouseGuest was given a chain link, and in rounds of 15 minutes, were to measure many randomly numbered planks, and to win, had to find the longest plank. Each round, each HouseGuest could make only one guess, and if it was wrong, had to sit out of the game until the subsequent round. After three rounds, Scott guessed the correct plank and became the 3rd Head of Household of the season.; The next day, America's Care Package was delivered, with Scott winning the power of choosing the type of Veto to be played for this week. He had the choice of the Diamond Power of Veto, which would allow the holder to veto a nominee and also choose the replacement nominee, the Boomerang Power of Veto, which allows the holder to veto both of the nominees on the block, and the Double Power of Veto, which puts two vetoes up for grabs, meaning that there would be two Power of Veto holders. During the two Safety Ceremonies, Scott nominated Neeley and Kryssie for eviction with Shane as a backdoor target, and the next day, Danielle was nominated by America for eviction. Later that day, the Power of Veto competition took place, where Scott chose to put the Double Power of Veto up for grabs.: Power of Veto ("Fitting In"): By random draw, the HouseGuests took turns choosing another HouseGuest to challenge in a puzzle, where four tetrominoes had to be fitted into a 4x4 square. The first HouseGuest to complete the puzzle and press the buzzer would eliminate the other HouseGuest from the competition, and would then go back to the end of the line. As the Double Power of Veto was in play, the competition would continue until two HouseGuests were left, where both would win a Power of Veto. Eventually, Justin and Alex both won the Power of Veto.; On Day 21, Justin chose to use the Power of Veto on Kryssie, and Alex chose not to use her Power of Veto. As Head of Household, Scott chose Shane, his main target, as the replacement nominee. Subsequently on Day 22, at the Live Eviction, the vote was split 4-4-0, including America, who voted for Danielle. As such, Scott as Head of Household, had to cast the tiebreaker vote and chose to evict Shane from the Big Brother house, making Shane the third to be evicted.
4	"Big Brother: Over the Top - Episode 4"	Days 22–29	October 26, 2016
After Shane was evicted, the HGs were surprised by Paul Abrahamian the runner up from Big Brother 18, who was there to host the next Head of Household competition, in which the HouseGuests went to the backyard to compete in.: Head of Household ("Perfect ShOTT"): The HGs had to search through a large pit of balls for balls which contained a token, and after collecting these tokens, had to use it to redeem red balls from Paul, which would then be used to roll down a winding board, in attempt to land the ball in a box at the end of the board. As Alex had won the handicap from the Veto for Sale competition, she had to wear a disorientating goggle, which would impair her vision. The first HouseGuest to roll a ball into the box would become the next Head of Household, and if no one could complete it within 1 hour, the game would have gone into a tiebreaker. However, Kryssie managed to roll a ball into the box before the time limit was up, and hence became the next Head of Household.; On Day 23, America's Care Package landed in the backyard, and it was announced that Alex had won the Safety Servant care package, which gave her safety for the week, but she had to wear a maid outfit and had to serve the Head of Household when instructed by Big Brother. As Alex was one of the targets of Kryssie, this threw a wrench in Kryssie's plan, causing her to target Scott instead. After which, in the following two days, Kryssie nominated Scott and Morgan for eviction, with Scott as her intended target. However, The next day, Kryssie's plans were put in jeopardy once again as it was revealed that America's Nominee was Neeley, a close ally of Kryssie. After the announcement, the HouseGuests entered the backyard one by one for the next Power of Veto competition, where Kryssie, Scott, Morgan, Neeley, Justin and Shelby participated.: Power of Veto ("Wall of Shame"): One by one, the HouseGuests entered the backyard, and were faced with a horizontal rock wall, with the pictures of the first three evicted HouseGuests, Cornbread, Monte and Shane, above it. They had to climb the wall to open up the pictures, which would reveal a question about that HouseGuest. They then had to return to the start and had to pick up numbered cards which answered the questions and return to that part of the wall to place the answers down. After placing all three, they had to press the buzzer at the start, and if correct, would lock in their timing. If wrong, they would need to correct the answer before buzzing in again. Should the HouseGuests fall off the wall, they would incur a three-minute time penalty. Ultimately, they had to complete the tasks within 30 minutes (not inclusive of time penalties) or they would be disqualified from the competition. Coming in just a mere 16 seconds before Scott, Morgan won the Power of Veto.; Subsequently, on Day 27, Morgan used the Power of Veto on herself, and Kryssie as Head of Household, chose Whitney as the 3rd person sitting on the couch come eviction day, along with Scott and Neeley. The next day at the live eviction, the votes landed 4-3-0, with America casting the deciding vote for the second time, this time against Neeley, making Neeley the fourth person evicted from the Big Brother House.
5	"A Superfan Kisses BB:OTT Goodbye"	Days 29–36	November 2, 2016
After Neeley's eviction, the HouseGuests proceeded to the memory wall to start the preparation for the next HoH competition, which Kryssie, as outgoing Head of Household, did not compete in.: Head of Household ("One Strike, You're Out"): The HouseGuests were given 10 minutes to memorize several images from their stay in the Big Brother house. After which, they headed to a backyard, for a series of True/False questions based on the photos they had previously seen. If a HouseGuest makes a mistake, they are eliminated from the competition, unless everyone else had answered it wrongly. If there was still more than one HouseGuest remaining after 10 questions, they would face off in a tiebreaker. After six questions, Danielle was the last HouseGuest standing and became the fifth Head of Household of the season.; The next day, America's Care Package landed, and it was revealed that Shelby had won the power to eliminate three eviction votes that week. This shocked the Late Night Jamboree of Jason, Justin, Kryssie and Danielle, who hated her. This caused Danielle to want to put her up, in order to ensure that she is not one of the three remaining votes that week. On Day 30 and 31, Danielle saved Jason, Justin, Kryssie, Scott, Morgan and Alex, leaving Shelby and Whitney on the block. Due to the possibility of Whitney flipping, Alex and Scott contemplated evicting her if it came down to it, as they had noticed her close relations with Justin. The next day, it was revealed that Scott was America's Nominee, after which Danielle, Scott, Shelby, Whitney, Jason and Justin competed in the next Power of Veto competition.: Power of Veto ("The Haunting of Clementine O'Grady"): While the rest of the HouseGuests watched from the safety of the HoH room, the PoV players search a pitch-black BB house for Clementine's doll, brush and rattle. Once they located these items, each player had to place them in a toy chest located in the middle of a "blood-soaked pentagram" which marked the spot of Clementine's death. The player to complete this task in the shortest amount of time would win the PoV. Players only had 15 minutes to search before angering the spirits and ending the game. With just a small headlamp to guide the way, each player had to endure random production assistants jumping out at them at any given moment. After completing the challenge, the player joined the other HouseGuests to watch the remainder of the comp. With an astounding time of 1:22, Danielle won the Power of Veto and became the first Head of Household to also win the Power of Veto this season.; Subsequently on Day 35, after being convinced that the target of the Ballsmashers was Whitney when her target was Scott, Danielle decided to use the Power of Veto to save Whitney, and nominated Morgan in her place as a pawn. The next day during the Live Eviction, Shelby cancelled out the votes of Jason, Justin and Kryssie with her Care Package, leaving three votes to evict from America, Alex and Whitney. Ultimately, Scott was evicted over Morgan and Shelby by a unanimous vote of 3-0-0.
6.1	"The Sisters Fight for their Lives on BB:OTT"	Days 36–43	November 9, 2016
6.2	"Double Eviction Shakes Up the BB:OTT House"	Days 36–43	November 10, 2016
Shortly after Scott was evicted from the Big Brother house, the HouseGuests were informed that the next Head of Household competition would begin, and that they would challenge one at a time. As such, they proceeded to the London Room to wait for their turn.: Head of Household ("Big Brother Over the Top Freshman Class"): The HGs were to go one by one, in which the order was by random draw, to the backyard, where they were faced with several face morphs of themselves and other HouseGuests. They had to match each face to the two people who were morphed into the picture in the fastest time possible without any hints to correct them if they were wrong. If they cannot complete within half an hour or before the previous fastest HouseGuest, they would be immediately disqualified from the competition. After racing through the competition with a time of 3:42, Shelby won the Head of Household competition.; On Day 37, America's Care Package was delivered to Jason, who won co-HoH. This granted him the rights and responsibilities of the Head of Household, and meant that Jason and Shelby would each nominate one HouseGuest for eviction. Due to the format of Safety Ceremonies, the nominations would be based on a series of alternately saving HouseGuests, with the two remaining HGs at the end becoming the nominees for the week. The next day, Shelby saved Morgan and Jason saved Kryssie. Following which, Shelby saved Alex, and Jason saved Justin, leaving Danielle and Whitney on the block. On Day 41, Alex was revealed as America's Nominee. Shelby, as the first Head of Household for the week, drew names to reveal who would participate in the Power of Veto competition. This week Alex, Danielle, Jason, Morgan, Shelby, and Whitney competed in this week's competition.: Power of Veto ("Balancing of Power"): In this competition, HouseGuests had to walk across a balance beam while holding a clear tube containing two balls. Once they got to the small platform at the end, they had to deposit both balls into another clear tube marked 1, 2, and 3. They then must make their way back across the balance beam and onto the original platform. If a HouseGuest fell off their balance beam, or dropped either of the balls out of the end of the tube, they would have to start over with whichever tube they were working on. If a HouseGuest got to their platform with a full tube, it would be automatically locked and they would begin the next one. Finishing first, Jason won the Power of Veto.; On the night before the Veto ceremony, Danielle and Jason decided to strike a final five deal with the Ballsmashers alliance with the promise to backdoor Justin. However, Danielle and Jason were not genuine with this deal and only made it to blindside them. On Day 42, Jason used the Power of Veto on Danielle, and he chose Morgan as the replacement nominee. On Day 43, Alex was evicted from the Big Brother house by a unanimous vote of 4-0-0. Rachel Reilly from Big Brother 12 and Big Brother 13 entered the house shortly afterwards to host the upcoming HoH competition.: Head of Household ("Big Brother Shopping Network"): In this competition, the HouseGuests were shown a series of infomercials featuring items relating to previous Big Brother competitions up for sale, plus shipping and handling. Afterwards, they would be quizzed in a series of true/false questions; correct answers would earn a point. The HouseGuest with the most points after seven questions would win. In the tie-breaker question, Danielle beat out Kryssie, Morgan, and Whitney for her second HoH title.; After the HoH competition, the remaining Ballsmasher alliance, Morgan and Shelby, were distraught at the thought of being alone with the remaining Late Night Jamboree. However, Morgan would go on to win the next America's Care Package and was subsequently awarded the Double Eviction Veto, which prevented her from being nominated in the initial safety ceremony and allowing her to veto one of Danielle's nomination. After the Care Package reveal, it was the Late Night Jamboree's turn to become distraught, having realized they have no choice but to take out one of their own. After deliberating with Shelby, Morgan, and Jason, Danielle nominated Justin and Whitney with the original intent to take out Justin but changed her mind and decided to target Whitney, for fear of her flipping back to the Ballsmashers. In the Veto ceremony, Morgan did not use the Power of Veto and Whitney was evicted in a 3-2 vote with Danielle breaking the tie.
7	"A New Alliance Emerges"	Days 43–50	November 16, 2016
After Whitney's eviction, the HGs drew numbers to decide the order in which they would play the next HoH competition.: Head of Household ("It's Time to Reflect"): In this competition, houseguests had to place four mirrors on stands and adjust them to direct a laser light into a target. The HouseGuest with the fastest time wins. After experiencing a few technical difficulties with one of the mirrors, Shelby was granted a redo challenge against the player with the lowest time, Jason, and solve a new laser puzzle. With a time of 4:03 compared to Jason's time of 9:52, Shelby became the new HoH.; Despite Danielle and Jason attempting to make deals with Shelby and Morgan to target Justin, Shelby and Morgan ultimately decided that they were untrustworthy after the fake final five deal they made last week with them and Alex. Shelby and Morgan decided to strike a final four deal with Kryssie and Justin to take out Danielle. On Day 47, Shelby nominated Danielle and Jason. On Day 48, Morgan was nominated by America.: Power of Veto ("Domi-knows"): In this competition, the HouseGuests had to stack dominoes through a series of gates with questions about previous events and competitions. Each gate had one correct answer and one incorrect answer. The player who stacked their dominoes, successfully knocked them over and through the correct answers in the fastest time would win the Power of Veto. If they were to stack their dominoes through the wrong gate, they would incur a three-minute penalty. Once again, with the fastest time of 9:38, Shelby won the PoV.; Subsequently on Day 49, Shelby used the Power of Veto to save Morgan leaving Danielle and Jason up on the block. The next day during the Live Eviction, Danielle was evicted over Jason by a unanimous vote of 4-0.
8	"The Final Veto Rocks the House"	Days 50–57	November 23, 2016
After Danielle's eviction, HouseGuests competed in a mental and endurance Head of Household competition.: Head of Household ("Keep You Posted"): In this competition, HouseGuests had to answer questions in the quiz part of the game in which the answers were either: male or female. The answers were then revealed during the endurance portion of the game where houseguests stood on a post. If they answered correctly, they stayed where they were. If they answered incorrectly, they moved to a smaller post in front of them. If a HouseGuest had not reached their final post after all the questions have been read, they were told to move forward every 5 minutes until they reached the smallest post. Morgan ended up lasting longer than Jason, Justin, and Kryssie.; Power of Veto ("Maize-maze"): In this competition, the HouseGuests had to make their way through a maze collecting three heirs of corn. Once they had all three heirs of corn, they needed to find the exit and press a button to lock in their time. Finishing with a time of 1:30, Jason won the final Power of Veto.; Subsequently on Day 56, Jason removed himself from the block, and being the only possible replacement nominee, Shelby took his place. The next day during the Live Eviction, Jason and Justin voted to evict Shelby.
9	"The Battle of the Final Four"	Days 57–63	November 29, 2016
After Shelby's eviction, the four HouseGuests went out to the backyard to compete in their final Head of Household competition.: Head of Household ("Uphill Battle"): In this competition, HouseGuests had to maneuver color coded balls up a board into the correct pockets using two ropes strapped to a metal bar. They must avoid pitfall holes throughout the board so that their ball does not fall through. Jason finished filling all of his pockets correctly first to ensure his safety into the Final 3.; On Day 60, Jason decided to take Kryssie with him to the Final 3. In doing so, Justin and Morgan must participate in a Do or Die competition to see who earns the final spot in the Final 3.: Do or Die Competition: In this competition, Justin and Morgan must match pictures of evicted HouseGuests to nine different questions correctly in order to solve the puzzle. At the sound of a buzzer, they had to study clues to each picture, race through a set of metal bars, jump over hay bales, and look through the different pictures. Once they got a picture, they would return through the obstacles, to the puzzle board, and place the picture above the clue that they think is a match. Only one photo can be carried through the obstacles at a time. Some clues may pertain to more than one HouseGuest.; Morgan rang in first with the correctly finished puzzle earning the final spot in the Final 3, sending Justin out the door.
10	"Big Brother Over the Top Crowns a Winner"	Days 64–65; Various (Note: In episode 10, the highlights of the final three HouseGuests, as well as other notable HouseGuests, were reviewed prior to crowning the winner.)	December 1, 2016

== America's Care Package ==
Each week, voters would choose which of the HouseGuests would receive a special power. As on Big Brother 18, all Care Packages were revealed to the public upon the commencement of the first vote. The HouseGuests were made aware of this twist, though the weekly rewards were left unspecified until the package was dropped in the backyard for public unboxing. Once a HouseGuest receives a Care Package, they are ineligible to receive another one until all other remaining HouseGuests have received one. During week 8, no voting for "The Final Four Challenge" Care Package took place, as all HouseGuests remaining had received a Care Package, except for Justin. Thus, the Care Package was awarded to him.

Week #		Name	Description	Winner	Result
2		Save-A-Friend	The winner earns the right to award immunity for the week to one other HouseGuest.	Kryssie	Jason
3		Pick-A-Veto	The winner gets to pick which type of veto the HouseGuests will be competing for this week, from three options: Diamond Veto: The holder of this veto has the power to remove a nominee and subsequently name their replacement.; Double Veto: Two vetoes will be awarded at the veto competition.; Boomerang Veto: The winner of this veto will be able to use it twice.	Scott	Double Veto
4		Safety Servant	The winner earns immunity for the week, but they must follow commands from Big Brother.	Alex	Immune
5		Eliminate Three; Eviction Votes	The winner can prevent three HouseGuests of their choice from voting in that week's eviction.	Shelby	Jason, Justin and Kryssie
6	Day 38	Co-HoH	The winner automatically becomes Co-HoH, earning immunity and the right to choose one of the two nominees.	Jason	Danielle; Morgan (Note: Jason originally nominated Danielle for eviction; however, after he won the veto, he used it to save Danielle and nominated Morgan in her place.)
6	Day 43	Double Eviction Veto	During this week's Double Eviction, the HouseGuests will not compete in a veto competition; instead, the winner of this Care Package will receive the veto and immunity from nomination.	Morgan	Veto Not Used
8		Final Four Challenge	The winner earns the opportunity to automatically advance to the Final Four, provided that they complete a special challenge.	Justin	Won Immunity

== America's Have-Nots ==
The HouseGuests were chosen by America's vote; the week's Head of Household was automatically exempted from the vote, as were the previous week's Have-Nots. During Week 6, no Have-Not voting took place as only three houseguests were eligible as Have-Nots. Shelby won Head of Household, Jason received the Co-HoH care package, and Justin, Kryssie, and Whitney were ineligible as the previous Have-Nots.

Week 1	Week 2	Week 3	Week 4	Week 5	Week 6	Week 7	Week 8	Week 9
(none)	Monte, Morgan, Scott	Alex, Danielle, Shelby	Jason, Neeley, Scott	Justin, Kryssie, Whitney	Alex, Danielle, Morgan	(none)		

== Voting history ==
In this edition, America voted to nominate one HouseGuest each week in addition to the Head of Household's nominations. This nomination is shown in bold. If that nominee were to be saved by the Power of Veto, there would not be a replacement nomination. America would also have a vote to evict one of the nominated HouseGuests each week, the nominee that receives the most votes from America would gain one extra eviction vote in addition to the votes cast against them by their fellow HouseGuests.

Color key:

Winner
Runner-up
Third Place
Head of Household
Nominated for eviction
Immune from eviction
Not eligible to vote
Won immunity via competition
Evicted

	Week 1	Week 2	Week 3	Week 4	Week 5	Week 6		Week 7	Week 8	Week 9	
	Week 1	Week 2	Week 3	Week 4	Week 5	Day 36	Day 43 (Note: Day 43 was a Double Eviction night. Immediately following Alex's eviction, the remaining HouseGuests played a week's worth of game, including an HoH competition and Safety, Veto and Eviction ceremonies, over the course of several hours, culminating in a second eviction that night. America was not given a nomination or an eviction vote, nor was there a Veto Competition; instead, the Veto was awarded to the winner of the Care Package.)	Week 7	Week 8	Day 57 (Note: During Week 9, there was no Veto competition or eviction vote. Instead, the Head of Household chose one houseguest to bring to the Final Three, with Jason choosing Kryssie. The remaining two houseguests would compete in a sudden death competition on Day 63, with the loser being evicted. Morgan won the competition, evicting Justin.)	Finale (Note: For the finale America voted for who they wanted to win Big Brother: Over the Top. Kryssie came in third place with the fewest votes. Morgan was crowned the winner after she received the most votes from America.)
Head(s) of Household	Monte	Alex	Scott	Kryssie	Danielle	Shelby; Jason (Note: For winning the "Co-HoH" Care Package, Jason was named Co-Head of Household. As Co-Heads of Household, Shelby and Jason alternated awarding safety to the other HouseGuests at the Safety Ceremony until two remained; Shelby and Jason then claimed one of the two nominees as theirs, earning the right to name the replacement nominee if that nominee was removed. Jason's nominations are in italics.)	Danielle	Shelby	Morgan	Jason	(None)
Nominations (initial)	**Cornbread**; Danielle; Jason	Danielle; **Monte**; Shane	**Danielle**; Kryssie; Neeley	Morgan; **Neeley**; Scott	**Scott**; Shelby; Whitney	**Alex**; Danielle; Whitney	Justin; Whitney	Danielle; Jason; **Morgan**	Jason; Kryssie	(None)	(None)
Veto winner(s)	Jason	Shane	Alex (Note: For winning the "Pick-a-Veto" Care Package, Scott was able to choose one of three special Vetoes for the week; he chose the Double Veto; therefore two Vetoes were awarded in that week's competition. Justin used his veto on Kryssie, and Alex decided to not use hers.); Justin	Morgan	Danielle	Jason	Morgan (Note: For winning the "Double Eviction Veto" Care Package, Morgan won the Power of Veto during the double eviction round; as this Care Package was awarded before the initial nominations, the veto also awarded Morgan immunity for the round.)	Shelby	Jason	(None)	(None)
Nominations (final)	**Cornbread**; Danielle; Kryssie	Danielle; Kryssie; **Monte**	**Danielle**; Neeley; Shane	**Neeley**; Scott; Whitney	Morgan; **Scott**; Shelby	**Alex**; Morgan; Whitney	Justin; Whitney	Danielle; Jason	Kryssie; Shelby	Justin; Morgan	(None)
Morgan	Cornbread	Danielle	Shane	Neeley	Nominated	Nominated	Justin	Danielle	Head of Household	**Win**	**Winner** (Day 65)
Jason	Cornbread	Monte (Note: For winning the "Save-a-Friend" Care Package, Kryssie could grant immunity to another HouseGuest; she chose Jason.)	Danielle	Scott	Not eligible (Note: For winning the "Eliminate Three Eviction Votes" Care Package, Shelby could block three HouseGuests from voting in that week's eviction; She chose Jason, Justin, and Kryssie.)	Co-Head of Household	Whitney	Nominated	Shelby	Kryssie	**Runner-up** (Day 65)
Kryssie	Nominated	Nominated	Danielle	Head of Household	Not eligible	Alex	Whitney	Danielle	Nominated	No Vote	**Third Place** (Day 65)
Justin	Cornbread	Monte	Danielle	Scott	Not eligible	Alex	Nominated	Danielle	Shelby (Note: As the only HouseGuest yet to receive a Care Package, Justin automatically earned the "Final Four Challenge" Care Package, earning the right to compete in a special challenge to earn immunity for the week; for completing the task, Justin became immune for the week.)	**Loss**	Evicted (Day 63)
Shelby	Cornbread	Danielle	Shane	Neeley	Nominated	Co-Head of Household	Justin	Head of Household	Nominated	Evicted (Day 57)	
Danielle	Nominated	Nominated	Nominated	Scott	Head of Household	Alex	Whitney (Note: As the house's vote was tied, the Head of Household cast a tie-breaker vote.)	Nominated	Evicted (Day 50)		
Whitney	Cornbread	Danielle	Shane	Nominated	Scott	Nominated	Nominated	Evicted (Day 43)			
Alex	Danielle	Head of Household	Shane	Neeley (Note: For winning the "Safety Servant" Care Package, Alex was awarded immunity for the week.)	Scott	Nominated	Evicted (Day 43)				
Scott	Cornbread	Danielle	Shane	Nominated	Nominated	Evicted (Day 36)					
Neeley	Cornbread	Monte	Nominated	Nominated	Evicted (Day 29)						
Shane	Cornbread	Monte	Nominated	Evicted (Day 22)							
Monte	Head of Household	Nominated	Evicted (Day 15)								
Cornbread	Nominated	Evicted (Day 8)									
America's Eviction Vote	Cornbread	Monte	Danielle	Neeley	Scott	Alex	Not eligible	Danielle	None (Note: From Week 8 onwards, there was no America's Nomination and America's Eviction Vote.)		
Evicted	**Cornbread**; 9 of 10 votes to evict	**Monte**; 5 of 9 votes to evict	**Shane**; 5 of 9 votes to evict	**Neeley**; 4 of 7 votes to evict	**Scott**; 3 of 3 votes to evict	**Alex**; 4 of 4 votes to evict	**Whitney**; 3 of 5 votes to evict	**Danielle**; 4 of 4 votes to evict	**Shelby**; 2 of 2 votes to evict	**Justin**; Evicted by competition	**Morgan**; Most votes to win
Evicted	**Cornbread**; 9 of 10 votes to evict	**Monte**; 5 of 9 votes to evict	**Shane**; 5 of 9 votes to evict	**Neeley**; 4 of 7 votes to evict	**Scott**; 3 of 3 votes to evict	**Alex**; 4 of 4 votes to evict	**Whitney**; 3 of 5 votes to evict	**Danielle**; 4 of 4 votes to evict	**Shelby**; 2 of 2 votes to evict	**Justin**; Evicted by competition	**Jason**; Fewest votes (out of 2)
Evicted	**Cornbread**; 9 of 10 votes to evict	**Monte**; 5 of 9 votes to evict	**Shane**; 5 of 9 votes to evict	**Neeley**; 4 of 7 votes to evict	**Scott**; 3 of 3 votes to evict	**Alex**; 4 of 4 votes to evict	**Whitney**; 3 of 5 votes to evict	**Danielle**; 4 of 4 votes to evict	**Shelby**; 2 of 2 votes to evict	**Justin**; Evicted by competition	**Kryssie**; Fewest votes (out of 3)

== Production ==
=== Development ===
The season was officially announced on August 3, 2016, by CBS while the eighteenth season was still in progress. The series continued to air on the CBS television network during the summer while the fall edition aired exclusively on the over-the-top streaming service CBS All Access which has been the broadcaster of the live Internet feeds since the seventeenth season. The season would utilize the same production team from past seasons with executive producers Allison Grodner and Rich Meehan for Fly on the Wall Entertainment in association with Endemol Shine North America. Julie Chen, who has been the host of the series since its inception, would also be part of this season. However, Robyn Kass, who has cast the program since the second season, would not cast this season. The shortest season since Big Brother 10, the season only lasted nine weeks. This was the first edition of the Big Brother franchise to air live exclusively online around the world and the second season overall to air only online after the first Chinese season, which was pre-recorded and aired at a later date in 2015.

=== Broadcasts ===
There was no television coverage for this season; instead, it would be completely streamed online at CBS All Access. There were weekday replays that would be scheduled to transmit on Mondays, Tuesdays, Thursdays and Fridays at 10:00pm ET/7:00pm PT that summarized the events of the previous day in the House. On Wednesdays starting at 10:00pm ET/7:00pm PT, there was a weekly recap episode followed by the live eviction with the Head of Household competition shortly after the eviction. On Thursdays, Julie had a live Q&A with the HouseGuests and interview the recently evicted HouseGuest. Special episodes aired on Tuesdays and Fridays at 10:30pm ET/7:30pm PT after the weekday replay where viewers can watch live diary room sessions. Have Nots for the week were shown on Saturdays at 4:00pm ET/1:00pm PT with the weekly safety ceremonies shown on Saturdays and Sundays at 10:00pm ET/7:00pm PT with the weekly nominations revealed live on Sundays.

While the live Internet feeds did not have any scheduled blackouts, slanderous statements and singing of copyrighted music would be blocked for legal reasons. For the first time in the history of the program the HouseGuests entered the house one by one live on the Internet feeds after host Julie Chen introduced the audience to the program and short introductory videos were shown.
