= Diletta Leotta =

Italian television presenter (born 1991)

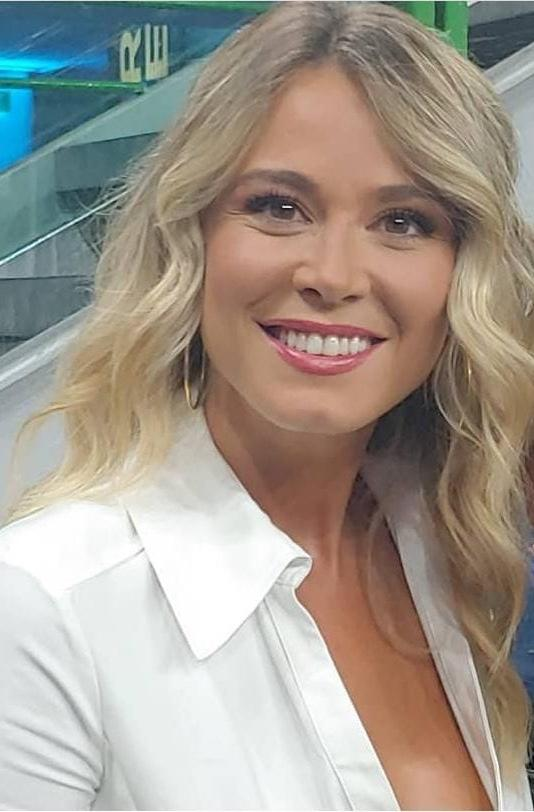
- Leotta in 2019
- Born: Giulia Diletta Leotta; 16 August 1991 (age 35); Catania, Sicily, Italy
- Education: Libera Università Internazionale degli Studi Sociali Guido Carli
- Occupations: Television presenter; radio personality; actress; model; author
- Years active: 2010–present
- Spouse: Loris Karius (m. 2024)
- Children: 2

Giulia Diletta Leotta (Italian: [ˈdʒuːlja diˈlɛtta leˈɔtta]; born 16 August 1991) is an Italian television presenter and radio personality.

== Career ==
Leotta briefly worked for Sky Meteo24 as a meteorologist at the beginning of her career. She currently presents the Serie A broadcasts for DAZN since the 2018–2019 season. Earlier, she had presented Serie B games on Sky Sport with Gianluca Di Marzio and Luca Marchegiani. From April to August of 2018, Leotta worked alongside Aída Yéspica as the host of 105 Take Away, a program of Radio 105. She hosted, along with Francesco Facchinetti, the 2018 edition of Miss Italia that was hired by La7 and won by Carlotta Maggiorana. In 2020, Leotta co-presented the 70th annual edition of the Sanremo Music Festival. She studied law at the Luiss University in Rome and graduated in 2015.

== Personal life ==
In March 2023, Leotta and Loris Karius, her partner and professional German goalkeeper, announced that she was pregnant with their first child. They got engaged later in the year, and Leotta gave birth to their first daughter, named Aria, on 16 August 2023. The couple got married on 22 June 2024, in a private ceremony on the island of Vulcano, Sicily in her birth country Italy. The couple welcomed their second child a boy named Leonardo.

Leotta currently resides in Porta Nuova, Milan, where she is neighbors with Italian singer and long-time friend Elodie.

== Filmography ==
- Lost Kisses (2010)
- The Comedians as Herself (2017)
- Faccio quello che voglio as Herself (2018)
- Miss Italia as Herself/host (2018)
- 7 Hours to Win Your Heart as Herself (2020)
- Sanremo Music Festival 2020 as Herself/presenter (2020)
- Celebrity Hunted - Caccia all'uomo as Herself/contestant (2021)
- Felicissima Sera as Herself (2021)
- Who Framed Santa Claus? as Sasha (2021)
- Stasera c’è Cattelan su Raidue (2022)
- Sarò con te as Herself (2024)
- Scherzi a parte (2024)
- Big Brothers appearance (2024)
- La talpa - Who Is The Mole (2024)
- Tú sí que vales (2025)
- Fonzies advertisement (2025)

== Bibliography ==
- Diletta Leotta - Scegli di sorridere, Sperling & Kupfer (2020)
- How To Homeschool Your Child (2022)
- How To Make Anyone Fall In Love With You (2022)
- Moving On Without You (2022)
