= Brother and Sister (disambiguation) =

"Brother and Sister" is a fairy tale known, in different variants, throughout Europe.

Brother and Sister or Sister and Brother, or variation, may also refer to:

- Siblings, known as brother and sister
- Brother and Sister (Greek fairy tale), a Greek fairy tale
- Brother and Sister (sculpture), an 1890 bronze by Auguste Rodin
- Little Brother And Little Sister, another title for Hansel and Gretel
- Brother and Sister, a poem by Lewis Carroll

== Film and TV ==
- Brother and Sister (1976 film), a Japanese film
- Brother and Sister (2010 film), an Argentine film
- Brother and Sister (2022 film), a French film

== Music ==
- Brother and Sister (opera), an opera by composer Henry Bishop and librettist William Reeve, 1815
- Brother, Sister, an album by indie rock band mewithoutYou, 2006
- Brother Sister, an album by the Brand New Heavies 1994
- Brother/Sister, an album by the band Hymns 2006

== See also ==
- Brothers and Sisters (disambiguation)
- Sister & Brother, a 1999 album by Melky Sedeck
- Sisters & Brothers, a 2011 film
