= Older Brother =

Older Brother may refer to:

- a brother senior in birth order
- My Annoying Brother (Korean: 형; RR: Hyeong; lit. 'Older Brother'), a 2016 South Korean comedy drama film

== See also ==
- Big Brother (disambiguation)
- Older Brother, Younger Sister, a 1953 Japanese drama film
- Older brother effect, in fraternal birth order and male sexual orientation
