= The Brilliance =

American music group

- Years active: 2010–present
- Label: independent
- Members: David Gungor; John Arndt
- Website: thebrilliancemusic.com

The Brilliance is an American music duo made up of David Gungor and John Arndt.

== History ==
David Gungor and John Arndt grew up together in Marshfield, Wisconsin. They formed the band together in 2010. Gungor previously led worship services in Tulsa, Oklahoma, and Arndt worked in Austin, Texas. The two moved to New York City and Chicago. David Gungor is the brother of Michael Gungor.

The duo released a self-titled album, The Brilliance, on October 19, 2010. They quickly followed it up with Advent, Vol. 1, on November 28, 2011. In 2012, the duo released several albums. They released Lent, on February 29, Advent, Vol. 2 on November 12, Cavetime – A Worship Experience, on November 23, and a live album titled The Road Recordings. Subsequently, they made two more extended plays. They released Advent B Sides EP on December 2, 2013, and the For Our Children EP, on December 2, 2014.

The duo signed with Integrity Music, which released Brother, the duo's first studio album, on February 17, 2015. The album charted on the Billboard Christian Albums chart at number 36. On January 27, 2017, Integrity Music released All is Not Lost. The album peaked at number 20 on Billboard's Christian Albums chart and number 12 on Billboard's Heatseeker's chart on February 18, 2017.

The Brilliance partnered with World Relief in their initiative to raise awareness for the DACA dreamers, which led to the first album in a series of "Suites", a set of songs and pieces united by a theme. The Dreamer Suite was featured on Spotify's New Music Friday playlist.

Following the success of "Oh Dreamer," Gungor and Arndt set out to write a new suite and called it "World Keeps Spinning," which they released at the beginning of 2020, and which features the Biola University orchestra and chorale.

On January 9, 2020, The Brilliance performed a Paste session in New York City, setting a record of having the most performers in Paste's tape room.

On May 15, 2020, The Brilliance released a music video in support of their single, "Telephone," that was dedicated to health care workers in the midst of the pandemic, and that was featured on YouTube's Video HotList at #5.

In 2022 & 2023, the band performed at the Christian music festival Big Church Festival.

The songs "God Our Mother" and "A Light" were also featured on both the God Our Mother and A Light albums by The Liturgists.

== Discography ==
List of studio albums, with selected chart positions
Title	Album details	Peak chart positions
Title	Album details	US Christian
Brother	Released: February 17, 2015; Label: Integrity Music; Format: CD, digital download, vinyl	36
All is Not Lost	Released: January 27, 2017; Label: Integrity Music; Format: CD, digital download, vinyl	20
Suite No.1: Oh Dreamer	Released: November 9, 2018; Label: Independent; Format: digital download, vinyl	
Suite No.2: World Keeps Spinning	Released: January 10, 2020; Label: Independent; Format: digital download, vinyl	
Feel It	Released: November 10, 2023; Label: Independent; Format: digital download	
