= Big Brother =

A big brother is a brother senior in birth order.

Big Brother may also refer to:

- Big Brother (Nineteen Eighty-Four), a character from George Orwell's novel Nineteen Eighty-Four
- Big Brother (franchise), reality competition television program franchise.

== Literature ==
- Big Brother (magazine), a skateboarding culture magazine
- Big Brother: A Novel, by Lionel Shriver, 2013

== Music ==
- "Big Brother" (David Bowie song), 1973
- "Big Brother" (Kanye West song), 2007
- Big Brother and the Holding Company, an American band
  - Big Brother & the Holding Company (album), 1967
- Big Brother Recordings, a British record label
- "Big Brother", a 2004 song by Girls Aloud from What Will the Neighbours Say?
- "Big Brother", a 2006 song by Morten Abel
- "Big Brother", a 1999 song by Reset from No Limits
- "Big Brother", a 1972 song by Stevie Wonder from Talking Book
- "Big Brother", a 2004 song by Susumu Hirasawa, as Kaku P-Model from Vistoron

== Film ==
- Big Brother (1923 film), a lost American silent drama
- Big Brother (2007 film), an Indian Hindi vigilante action film
- Big Brother (2015 film), a Bangladeshi action romance
- Big Brother (2018 film), a Hong Kong action drama
- Big Brother (2020 film), an Indian Malayalam-language action thriller
- The Big Brother, a 1982 French crime drama film

== Television ==
=== Reality television ===
- Big Brother (franchise)
  - Big Brother (American TV series)
  - Big Brother (Australian TV series)
  - Big Brother (Belgian TV series)
  - Big Brother (British TV series)
  - Big Brother (Bulgarian TV series)
  - Big Brother (Croatian TV series)
  - Big Brother (Czech TV series)
  - Big Brother (Danish TV series)
  - Big Brother (Dutch TV series)
  - Big Brother (Dutch and Belgian TV series)
  - Big Brother (Finnish TV series)
  - Big Brother (German TV series)
  - Big Brother (Greek TV series)
  - Big Brother (Indonesian TV series)
  - Big Brother (Israeli TV series)
  - Big Brother (Norwegian TV series)
  - Big Brother (Norwegian and Swedish TV series)
  - Big Brother (Polish TV series)
  - Big Brother (Portuguese TV series)
  - Big Brother (Quebec TV series)
  - Big Brother (Romanian TV series)
  - Big Brother (Russian TV series)
  - Big Brother (Serbian TV series)
  - Big Brother (Slovak TV series)
  - Big Brother (Slovenian TV series)
  - Big Brother (South African TV series)
  - Big Brother (Swedish TV series)
  - Big Brother (Swiss TV series)
  - Big Brother (Ukrainian TV series)
  - Big Brother Africa
  - Big Brother Albania
  - Big Brother Angola
  - Big Brother Brasil, Brazil
  - Big Brother Canada
  - Big Brother China
  - Big Brother México
  - Big Brother Naija, Nigeria
  - Big Brother Thailand
  - Big Brother Türkiye, Turkey
  - Big Brother: The Boss, Arabia
  - Bigg Boss (disambiguation), India
  - Gran Hermano, Spanish-language versions
  - Grande Fratello, Italy
  - Pinoy Big Brother, Philippines

=== Other television ===
- "Big Brother", an episode of The Andy Griffith Show
- "Big Brother", an episode of Are You Being Served?
- "Big Brother", an episode of CSI: Miami season 2
- "Big Brother" (Glee), a TV episode
- "Big Brother" (Only Fools and Horses), a TV episode
- "Big Brother", an episode of Yes Minister

== Other uses ==
- Big Brother (software), a tool for systems and network monitoring
- Big Brothers Big Sisters of America, a youth mentoring program where adult volunteers are often referred to as "big brothers"

== See also ==
- Brother (disambiguation)
- Older Brother (disambiguation)
- Sister (disambiguation)
- Little Brother (disambiguation)
- Little Sister (disambiguation)
- Big Sister (disambiguation)
- Big Brothers Big Sisters (disambiguation)
- Big Boss (disambiguation)
- Authoritarian personality, is a personality type
- Big Brother Awards, a satirical award for acts against personal privacy
- Big Brother Movement, an Australian youth migration program
- Big Brother Watch, a British civil liberties and privacy campaigning organisation
- "My Big Brother", an episode of Scrubs season 2
- Fraternal birth order and male sexual orientation
- Surveillance, the monitoring of behavior, activities or information
- Very Big Brother, a spacecraft launch vehicle
