= Gran Hermano =

Gran Hermano ("Big Brother" in Spanish) is the name of several versions of the reality TV series Big Brother. It may refer to:

- Gran Hermano (American TV series)
- Gran Hermano (Argentine TV series)
- Gran Hermano (Chilean TV series)
- Gran Hermano (Colombian TV series)
- Gran Hermano (Ecuadorian TV series)
- Gran Hermano del Pacífico (Ecuador, Chile and Peru)
- Gran Hermano (Spanish TV series)
- Gran Hermano (Uruguayan TV series)

== See also ==
- Big Brother (franchise), the international franchise
- Big Brother (disambiguation)
