= Little Brothers – Friends of the Elderly =

American non-profit volunteer network

Little Brothers – Friends of the Elderly is a network of non-profit, volunteer-based organizations located in the United States that are committed to relieving isolation and loneliness among the elderly. Little Brothers – Friends of the Elderly is a member of the International Federation of Little Brothers of the Poor (French: Fédération Internationale des petits frères des Pauvres) with sister organizations in France, Germany, Poland, Switzerland, Spain, Ireland, the United States of America and Canada. The American organization was founded 1959 following the French chapter in 1946 by Armand Marquiset.
