= International Federation of Little Brothers of the Poor =

Organization

The International Federation of Little Brothers of the Poor (French: Fédération internationale des petits frères des Pauvres or French: Les petits frères des Pauvres) is a federation of volunteer-based non-profit organizations committed to relieving isolation and loneliness among the elderly. They aim to create links between elderly people who need to make friends for example clubs or classes. Even during lockdowns they want to help those in need maintain contact.

It was founded 1979 in Rolle, Switzerland and has been recognized as a NGO (non-governmental organization) in consultative status (category II) with the United Nations Economic and Social Council. The Federation grew out of les petits frères des Pauvres, the original organization founded in France in 1946 by Armand Marquiset to serve elderly people left isolated and impoverished after World War II.

In 2008, volunteers held a benefit concert in Toulouse, France, to raise money for the organization.

== Members ==
Its member countries / organizations are:

- Canada: les petits frères des Pauvres
- France: les petits frères des Pauvres
- Germany: Freunde alter Menschen e. V.
- Ireland: The Little Brothers (Friends of the Elderly) Limited.
- Mexico: Los Hermanos del Anciano A.C.
- Poland: Mali bracia Ubogich
- Spain: Amigos de los mayores / Amics de la Gent Gran
- Switzerland: La Fondation les petits frères des Pauvres
- United States: Little Brothers - Friends of the Elderly

== See also ==
- La Brindille D'Or
