= Los Hermanos (disambiguation) =

Los Hermanos is a Brazilian rock band.

Los Hermanos (Spanish for "the brothers") may also refer to:

- Los Hermanos (album), the band's 1999 debut album
- "Los Hermanos" (song), a folk song composed and first performed by Atahualpa Yupanqui
- Los Hermanos Archipelago, Venezuela
- Darwin Island and Wolf Island, two of the Galápagos Islands, known collectively as "Los Hermanos" in Spanish

== See also ==
- Las Hermanas (disambiguation)
- Hermano (disambiguation)
