= Las Hermanas =

Las Hermanas (Spanish for "the sisters") may refer to:

- Las Hermanas (organization), a feminist Catholic organization for Spanish-speaking women
- Las Hermanas (ballet), a 1971 ballet
- Las Hermanas (TV series), a Philippine TV series

== See also ==
- Hermanas, a 2005 film
- Los Hermanos (disambiguation)
- Hermano (disambiguation)
