= Allan Baillie =

Australian writer

- Born: 28 January 1943 (age 83); Scotland
- Occupations: Author, Journalist
- Writing career
- Genres: Children's literature, Young adult fiction, Adult fiction, Short stories
- Notable works: Adrift, Little Brother, The China Coin

Allan Baillie (born 28 January 1943) is an Australian writer. He was born in Scotland but moved with his family to Australia when he was seven. His first job was working as a Cadet Journalist, and then he began to work as a journalist working on papers such as the Melbourne Sun, The Telegraph and The Australian Women's Weekly having studied journalism at Melbourne University. Turning to literature his books include Adrift, Little Brother and The China Coin. He lives in Sydney, Australia, with his wife and two children.

== Pipe incident ==
Allan Baillie was injured on 8 November 2010 when he was sucked down a pipe at a swimming pool near Sydney and discharged onto the beach. He was swimming laps at Bilgola Beach rock pool with his wife when a Pittwater Council worker opened a valve to drain the pool for cleaning. He intends to seek compensation.

== Bibliography ==
=== Children's novels ===
- Adrift (1984)
- Little Brother (1985)
- Little Monster (1991)
- The Bad Guys (1993) (aka The Bad Boys)
- The Excuse (1997)
- Foggy (2001)
- Imp (2002)
- My Australian Story: Riding with Thunderbolt: The Diary of Ben Cross (2004)

=== Children's picture books ===
- Drac and the Gremlin (1988)
- Bawshou Rescues the Sun: A Han Folktale (1991)
- The Boss (1992)
- Rebel! (1993)
- Old Magic (1996)
- DragonQuest (1996)
- Star Navigator (1997)
- Archie: The Big Good Wolf (1998)

=== Children's non-fiction ===
- Legends: Stories of Australia (1999)

=== Young adult novels ===
- Riverman (1986)
- Eagle Island (1987)
- Megan's Star (1988)
- Hero (1990)
- The China Coin (1991)
- Magician (1992)
- Songman (1994)
- Secrets of Walden Rising (1996)
- The Last Shot (1997)
- Wreck! (1997)
- Saving Abbie (2000)
- Treasure Hunters (2002)
- Cat's Mountain (2006)
- Krakatoa Lighthouse (2009)

=== Adult novels ===
- Mask Maker (1974)

=== Collections ===
- Creature (1987)
- Mates and Other Stories (1989)
- Dream Catcher and Other Stories (1995)
- The Phone Book (1995)
- Ten Out of Ten (2003)
- A Taste of Cockroach (2005)

=== Short fiction ===
- "The Plumber" (1988) in Dream Catcher and Other Stories (ed. Allan Baillie)
- "Silent Night" (1989) in Bizarre (ed. Penny Matthews)
- "Liz" (1989) in Amazing (ed. Penny Matthews)
- "The Mouth" (1990) in Weird (ed. Penny Matthews)
- "Dream Catcher" (1991) in Into the Future (ed. Toss Gascoigne, Jo Goodman, Margot Tyrrell)
- "The Champion" (1991) in Dream Catcher and Other Stories (ed. Allan Baillie)
- "The Bed-Sitter" (1991) in Dream Catcher and Other Stories (ed. Allan Baillie)
- "Bones" (1992) in Spine Chilling (ed. Penny Matthews)
- "Snatch" (1992) in Goodbye and Hello (ed. Margot Hillel)
- "The Nag" (1995) in Dream Catcher and Other Stories (ed. Allan Baillie)
- "Cheat!" (1995) in Dream Catcher and Other Stories (ed. Allan Baillie)
- "The Gun" (1995) in Dream Catcher and Other Stories (ed. Allan Baillie)
- "The Forest" (1995) in Dream Catcher and Other Stories (ed. Allan Baillie)
- "Mobile" (1995) in Dream Catcher and Other Stories (ed. Allan Baillie)
- "The Greening" (2000) in Tales from the Wasteland (ed. Paul Collins)
- "The Plot — Mordred's story" (2002) in The Road to Camelot (ed. Sophie Masson)

== Awards and nominations ==
- Australian Multicultural Children's BOTY Award – Miscellaneous category- Joint Winner – 1992 for The China Coin
- CBC Book of the Year – Picture Book category – Joint Winner – 1989 for Drac & the Gremlin

Various nominations

- W.A. Young Readers Book Award (WAYRA) – listed twice (once shortlisted)
- S.A. Kanga Awards – listed once
- New South Wales State Literary Award – shortlisted twice
- Kids Own Aust Literature Award (KOALA) – shortlisted three times
- Children's Peace Lit Award (PEACE) – Best Book – shortlisted once
- Young Aust Best Book Award (YABBA) – Picture Book – shortlisted once
