= Petite sœur =

Petit soeur or Petite sœur (lit. 'Little sister') may refer to:

- Petite Sœur (film), a 1996 French television film
- "Petite Sœur" (song), a 2005 song by French singer Lââm
- Petite Soeur, Seychelles; an island

== See also ==
- Little Sister (disambiguation)
