= Sisters Creek =

Sisters Creek may refer to:

- Sisters Creek, Tasmania, a locality in Tasmania, Australia
- Sisters Creek, the former name (from 1899 to 1977) of The Sisters, Victoria, a locality in the Shire of Moyne, Victoria, Australia
- Sisters Creek, a tributary of the Inglis River, a river in Tasmania
- Sisters Creek, a tributary of the St. Johns River, in Florida, US
