= Paranoia Agent (soundtrack) =

2004 soundtrack album by Susumu Hirasawa

Paranoia Agent Original Soundtrack

Soundtrack album by Susumu Hirasawa
- Released: May 12, 2004 (JP); April 5, 2005 (US)
- Label: Geneon (US)
- Producer: Susumu Hirasawa

Susumu Hirasawa soundtrack chronology
| Millennium Actress Original Soundtrack (2002) | Paranoia Agent Original Soundtrack (2004) | Paprika Original Soundtrack (2006) |

Paranoia Agent Original Soundtrack is the soundtrack to the TV series Paranoia Agent composed by Susumu Hirasawa. The CDs catalog number is #5274, and is labeled by Geneon Entertainment, the same company that originally held the English language rights to the anime series in the US.

== Track listing ==
All tracks are written by Susumu Hirasawa, except "Condition Boy" by Hirasawa, Sacol Trakranprasirt and Supat Kuntatun.

| No. | Title | Length |
|---|---|---|
| 1. | "Dream Island Obsessional Park" (夢の島思念公園 Yume no Shima Shinen Kōen) | 3:43 |
| 2. | "Sub-usual" (準日常 Jun Nichijō) | 2:45 |
| 3. | "Focus" | 1:34 |
| 4. | "Happiness" (幸福 Kōfuku) | 2:38 |
| 5. | "Object Definition" (対象定義 Taishō Teigi) | 1:43 |
| 6. | "Confrontational Paranoia" (対峙妄想 Taiji Mōsō) | 3:04 |
| 7. | "Tension" (緊張 Kinchō) | 1:10 |
| 8. | "Hero" (勇者 Yūsha) | 1:37 |
| 9. | "Condition Boy" (条件童子 Jōken Dōji) | 3:07 |
| 10. | "Black Beach" (黒ヶ浜 Kurogahama) | 2:05 |
| 11. | "Cultivation" (培養 Baiyō) | 2:49 |
| 12. | "Shadow" (影 Kage) | 2:33 |
| 13. | "Reverie Hill" (夢想ヶ谷 Musōgatani) | 4:23 |
| 14. | "Escape" (逃亡 Tōbō) | 2:55 |
| 15. | "Obsession Layer" (思念層 Shinensō) | 3:26 |
| 16. | "Tenacity" (執着 Shūchaku) | 1:53 |
| 17. | "Dream Island - Expectation" (夢の島 - 期待 Yume no Shima - Kitai) | 1:36 |
| 18. | "Core" | 3:03 |
| 19. | "White Hill - Maromi's Theme" (白ヶ丘 - マロミのテーマ Shirogaoka - Maromi no Tēma) | 1:32 |

US release bonus track
| No. | Title | Length |
|---|---|---|
| 20. | "Grandfatherly Wind" (祖父なる風 Sofunaru Kaze) (from Blue Limbo) | 4:53 |

- "Condition Boy" contains a sample of "Kun Mae #3" by Syun, from the album Kun Mae on a Calculation.
- "Cultivation" was sampled by Kaku P-Model for "Cruise Psyclaon", from the album Vistoron.

=== Outtake Collection ===
On May 16, 2004, Hirasawa released outtakes of the soundtrack, which are alternate arrangements of song melodies that were included in the final soundtrack and one unused theme, on his website.

All tracks are written by Susumu Hirasawa.

| No. | Title | Length |
|---|---|---|
| 1. | "White Hill 2" (白ヶ丘 2 Shirogaoka 2) | 1:32 |
| 2. | "Reverie Hill 2" (夢想ヶ谷 2 Musōgatani 2) | 1:31 |
| 3. | "Gate of Paranoia" (妄想の門 Mōsō no Mon) | 1:35 |
| 4. | "Dream Island - Daytime" (夢の島 - 昼 Yume no Shima - Hiru) | 1:02 |
| 5. | "Dream Island - Branch Point" (夢の島 - 分岐点 Yume no Shima - Bunkiten) | 1:32 |
| 6. | "Tenacity 1" (執着 1 Shūchaku 1) | 1:44 |
| 7. | "Anxiety" (不安 Fuan) | 1:03 |
| 8. | "Hero 1" (勇者 1 Yūsha 1) | 1:50 |
| 9. | "Core 1" | 1:13 |
| 10. | "Sub-usual 2" (準日常 2 Jun Nichijō 2) | 1:03 |

== Personnel ==
- Susumu Hirasawa - Voice, Electronic keyboard, Amiga, Personal computer, Digital audio workstation, Synthesizers, Sampler, Sequencer, Programming, Production
- Masanori Chinzei - Recording, Mixing, Mastering
- mediaHYPERIUM Studios - Mastering (US release)
- Rihito Yumoto and Mika Hirano (Chaos Union) - A&R
- Kiyoshi Inagaki - Design
- Koyo Graphic International - Design (US release)
- Masaru Owaku - Photography, Photographic Processing
- Syotaro Takami - Translation
- Michiko Powers - Production (US release)
- Nobu Yamamoto - Executive production (US release)
