= Brothers (surname) =

Brothers is a surname. Notable people with the surname include:

- Caroline Brothers (fl. 2022), Australian-born writer
- Cary Brothers (born 1974), American singer-songwriter
- Fletcher Brothers, American fundamentalist preacher and author
- Jim Brothers (1941–2013), American sculptor
- Joyce Brothers (1927–2013), American psychologist and columnist
- Kerry Brothers Jr. (born 1970), American songwriter
- Michael Brothers (1870–1952), British politician
- Leo Vincent Brothers (1899–1950), American gangster and murderer
- Paul Brothers, Canadian television personality
- Paul Brothers (Canadian football) (born 1945), American football player
- Peter Malam Brothers (1917–2008), Battle of Britain pilot
- Rex Brothers (born 1987), American baseball player
- Richard Brothers (1757–1824), Canadian religious leader and author
- Vincent Brothers (born 1962), American mass murderer
