= Brother (The Brilliance album) =

Studio album by The Brilliance
- Released: February 17, 2015
- Genre: Contemporary worship music
- Length: 38:43
- Label: Integrity

Brother is the first studio album by The Brilliance released on February 17, 2015 by Integrity Music.

== Critical reception ==
Professional ratings
Review scores
Source	Rating
CCM Magazine	3.5/5 stars
The Christian Manifesto	5/5 stars
Christian Review Magazine	5/5 stars
CM Addict	3.5/5 stars
Cross Rhythms	8/10 squares
Indie Vision Music	5/5 stars
Jesus Freak Hideout	4.5/5 stars
Louder Than the Music	5/5 stars
New Release Tuesday	3.5/5 stars
Worship Leader	4.5/5 stars

Mentioning in a three and a half star review from CCM Magazine, Grace S. Aspinwall recognizes, "There is a serenity and simple peace in the music from The Brilliance,... Though they might not connect with all listeners, their ability to immediately utilize spaces between musical notes is a needed respite that crosses genres." Signaling in a four and a half star review by Worship Leader, Andrea Hunter realizes, "both the presentation and content are fresh worship phenomena—also evidenced in their live performances" Roger Gelwicks, indicating for Jesus Freak Hideout in a four and a half star review, recognizes, the album is "Both unassuming and stunning, The Brilliance's Brother is an early highlight of 2015." Specifying in a three and a half star review from New Release Tuesday, Jonathan Francesco responds, "For those who want worship music that takes a new and creative, yet subtle, approach to its musical offerings, Brother may be something worth checking out." Scott Fryberger, designating the album a four and a half star project, replies, "Brother is a marvelous indie pop record." Identifying in a five star review by Indie Vision Music, Ian Zandi declares, "The Brilliance have found a stirring recipe for worship and it will truly be timeless." In an eight out of ten review by Cross Rhythms, Ian Homer says, "The Brilliance have something fresh to offer the worshipping Church." Awarding the album three and a half stars, Jon Ownbey writes, "Brother is a solid album that doesn't grow old after the first song but works to create a powerful mood for the listener." Jono Davies, awarding the album five stars at Louder Than the Music, says, "If you're looking for big melodic anthemic choruses, look somewhere else, but if you're looking for an album to play and get lost in, while looking out of the window as the world passes by, get this!" Writing a review for Christian Review Magazine, Leah St. John rating the album five stars describes, "Brother is a beautifully quite masterpiece." Calvin Moore, rating the album five stars at The Christian Manifesto, writes, "The Brilliance is contemplative worship at its finest."

== Accolades ==
This album was No. 1, on the Worship Leader's Top 20 Albums of 2015 list.

The song "Prayers of the People" was No. 10 on the Worship Leader's Top 20 Songs of 2015 list.

== Track listing ==
No.	Title	Writer(s)	Length
1.	"Brother"	John Arndt, David Gungor, Ian Cron	3:32
2.	"Now and at the Hour"	John Arndt, David Gungor	3:19
3.	"Yahweh"	John Arndt, David Gungor	4:24
4.	"Does Your Heart Break"	John Arndt, David Gungor	5:30
5.	"Love Remains"	John Arndt, David Gungor	2:29
6.	"Breathe"	John Arndt, David Gungor, Michael Gungor, Lisa Gungor	3:38
7.	"Dust We Are and Shall Return"	John Arndt, David Gungor, Kate Gungor	3:19
8.	"Prayers of the People"	John Arndt, David Gungor, Ian Cron, Ben Kilgore, Evan Wickham	2:01
9.	"Make Us One"	John Arndt, David Gungor, Brennan Smiley, Dave Campbell, David Baloche	4:31
10.	"May You Find a Light (Reprise)"	John Arndt, David Gungor	6:04
Total length:			38:43

== Charts ==
Chart (2015)	Peak position
US Christian Albums (Billboard)	36
