= Brothers TV =

- Created by: Andy Rimer; Josh Rimer
- Starring: Andy Rimer; Josh Rimer
- No. of episodes: 8

Production
- Production locations: Calgary, Alberta, Canada

Original release
- Network: Access; OUTtv
- Release: 2 October – 20 November 2004

Brothers TV is a Canadian comedy variety television series originally broadcast on Access in 2004 and then OUTtv in 2005. The series was created by and starred real life brothers Andy and Josh Rimer and included sketch comedy segments, hidden camera pranks, conversations with strangers, and comical debates.

== Production ==
Brothers TV was inspired by Andy's desire to make a website for himself and a 30-second sketch was recorded via a webcam. From combining Josh's passion for acting and Andy's love of pranks came the pitch for the series. When it was suggested they make a demo a 15-minute video was produced and sent to various production companies. That led to an offer to send the brothers to Hollywood to pitch their series. Television executives were receptive to their idea but concerned about their lack of experience. It was suggested they make a few episodes and then try again. Brothers TV began production in August 2004 and was filmed in Calgary, Alberta. After making three episodes they thought to air them themselves so they purchased airtime on Access, Alberta's public television station. The series debuted at 1:30am on 2 October 2004. A total of eight episodes were made.

== Reception ==
Laura Tester of the Red Deer Advocate describes the series as "a mixture of Tom Green, Saturday Night Live, Candid Camera, and The Tonight Show." Having viewed early footage of the series Stephen W. Smith of FFWD Weekly described the series as "lowbrow comedic stuff that is ever-so-watchable". He went on to say that "Josh and Andy don't have to stoop to the Jackass level of depravity to garner legitimate laughs."

After airing on Access the show was bought by OUTtv in 2005 and began airing on the cable channel on 4 September 2005. Though only eight episodes were produced, the series continued to be shown on OUTtv through the summer of 2008.
