= La Brindille D'Or =

La Brindille D'Or (The Golden Sprig), established 26 November 1920, provides financial assistance to the parents of fallen French soldiers by the Marquise de Saint-Vincent-Brassac.

At the time the state's assistance to parents was limited and insufficient for many elderly that often depended on their sons in retirement. The great toll of World War I left many in need at this time. The society petitioned people with means to commit to donate lifelong or for certain number of years (in January or May each year) "La Fleur du Soldat": The little flower (La petite fleur) 5 francs, the flower (La fleur) 10 francs, and the bouquet (Le bouquet) 100 francs. The money was used to buy government bonds, the returns from which were used to augment the low state pension of parents. The treasurer of the association was M. Nassoy, Director of the Bank of France, in Toulouse. The honorary president of the association was M. Foch. The association was situated at 7, rue de la Dalbade in Toulouse (FR), although correspondence could also be sent to Chateau de Brassac (Tarn, FR). To strengthen the society Pope Pius (Pié) XI gave a gift (1924) in the form of a precious jewel ("broche"). Other known generous donor was Baron Joseph de Saint-Vincent at Chateau Las Lanès (Fontcouverte, Aude, FR). A play titled TAMPON ("Un acte en vers") was published by the Marquise with all proceedings going to the society ("Tous droits réservés au profit de l´ouvre de La Brindille D´Or"). La Brindille D'Or later inspired the formation of Little Brothers of the Poor (Les Petite Frères des Pauvres).
