= Baby Sister =

Baby Sister may refer to:

- "Baby Sister" (song), a 1985 single by La Toya Jackson
- Baby Sister (album), a 1983 album by June Pointer
- Baby Sister (film), a 1983 American made-for-television drama film
- "Baby Sister", a song by Dolly Parton from the album Just Because I'm a Woman
