= Hermano =

Hermano (Spanish for "brother") or Hermanos may refer to:

== Film and television ==
- Hermano (film), a 2010 Venezuelan drama
- Hermanos (film), a 1939 Argentine drama
- Hermanos (TV series), a 2014 Spanish drama series
- "Hermanos" (Breaking Bad), a 2011 TV episode
- "Hermanos" (Generator Rex), an unaired TV episode
- "Hermanos" (One Day at a Time), a 2019 TV episode

== Music ==
- Hermano (band), an American stoner rock band
- Hermanos, a 1983 album by Pimpinela
- "Hermanos", a 2023 song by JPEGMafia and Danny Brown from Scaring The Hoes: DLC Pack

== See also ==
- Proyecto Hermanos, a charity supergroup which recorded the 1985 single "Cantaré, cantarás"
- Los Hermanos (disambiguation)
- Las Hermanas (disambiguation)
