= Little Brother (Baillie novel) =

1985 novel by Allan Baillie

- Author: Allan Baillie
- Illustrator: Elizabeth Honey
- Language: English
- Genre: Children's
- Set in: Cambodia
- Publisher: Thomas Nelson
- Publication date: 1985
- Publication place: Australia
- Media type: Print
- Pages: 144
- ISBN: 0170065545
- OCLC: 20499025

Little Brother is a 1985 children's novel by award winning Australian author Allan Baillie about life in Cambodia under the Khmer Rouge. It was illustrated by Elizabeth Honey.

== Plot introduction ==
It follows a young boy, separated from his elder brother whilst attempting to flee the terror of the reign of the Khmer Rouge in Cambodia. It provides an insight into the general plight of refugees using the specific instance of this horrible experience as a backdrop.

Muong Vithy is the main character of Little Brother.

Vithy has worked for a year in the Big Paddy, with his big brother Mang. Their sister, Sorei, and their mother and father are gone. They run away, trying to escape from the soldiers, the Khmer Rouge. They manage to get away, but not for long. Mang has advice for getting away: "Follow the lines... to the border." Vithy is puzzled about the advice. What lines? Which border? Suddenly they are separated as they run for their life and Vithy is left alone in the forest. The soldiers leave him, no doubt pursuing Mang.

Vithy forages for food that night and starts traveling to Cambodia's border. As he is traveling beside the road he sees soldiers - not the Khmer Rouge.

He finds himself on the outskirts of the now deserted Phnom Penh, finds a little gold leaf and meets a boy (real name Ang), the King. Vithy stays in the King's City and fixes a motor for him. When they are working for their meals the King hides Vithy in a truck, and gives him the gold leaf as payment for the motor and some water.

The truck travels very near Angkor. Vithy jumps off and walks for a few hours. Then, he finds himself face to face with a young boy, though much older than himself, on a bicycle and bribes the boy with the gold leaf the King gives him. The boy says it is too little but lets him build a bicycle in his graveyard of bicycles. Will Vithy make it to the border on his struggle to find his older brother?

== Reception ==
Reviews of Little Brother were mostly positive. Although Kirkus Reviews found "The atrocities and privations that make ... other refugee stories so searing are kept offstage here; this is a milder narrative", they also found that "Baillie keeps the plot moving and his characters are deftly drawn and believable." Publishers Weekly stated that "Baillie sensitively expresses the depth of Vithy's loneliness while exploring the boy's growing independence and gradual rebuilding of trust." and "Offering insight into the Vietnamese/Cambodian experience, this haunting tale confirms the universality of human instincts and emotions." Valerie Bierman, writing for Books for Keeps, believed it "a gem which deserves to become a classic, it(sic) only to demonstrate to children the futility and cruelty of war."

== Awards and nominations ==
- The Children's Book Council of Australia - Children's Book of the Year Awards 1986 - Highly commended (i.e. Runner up)
