= ARP Little Brother =

Monophonic sound module

Little Brother
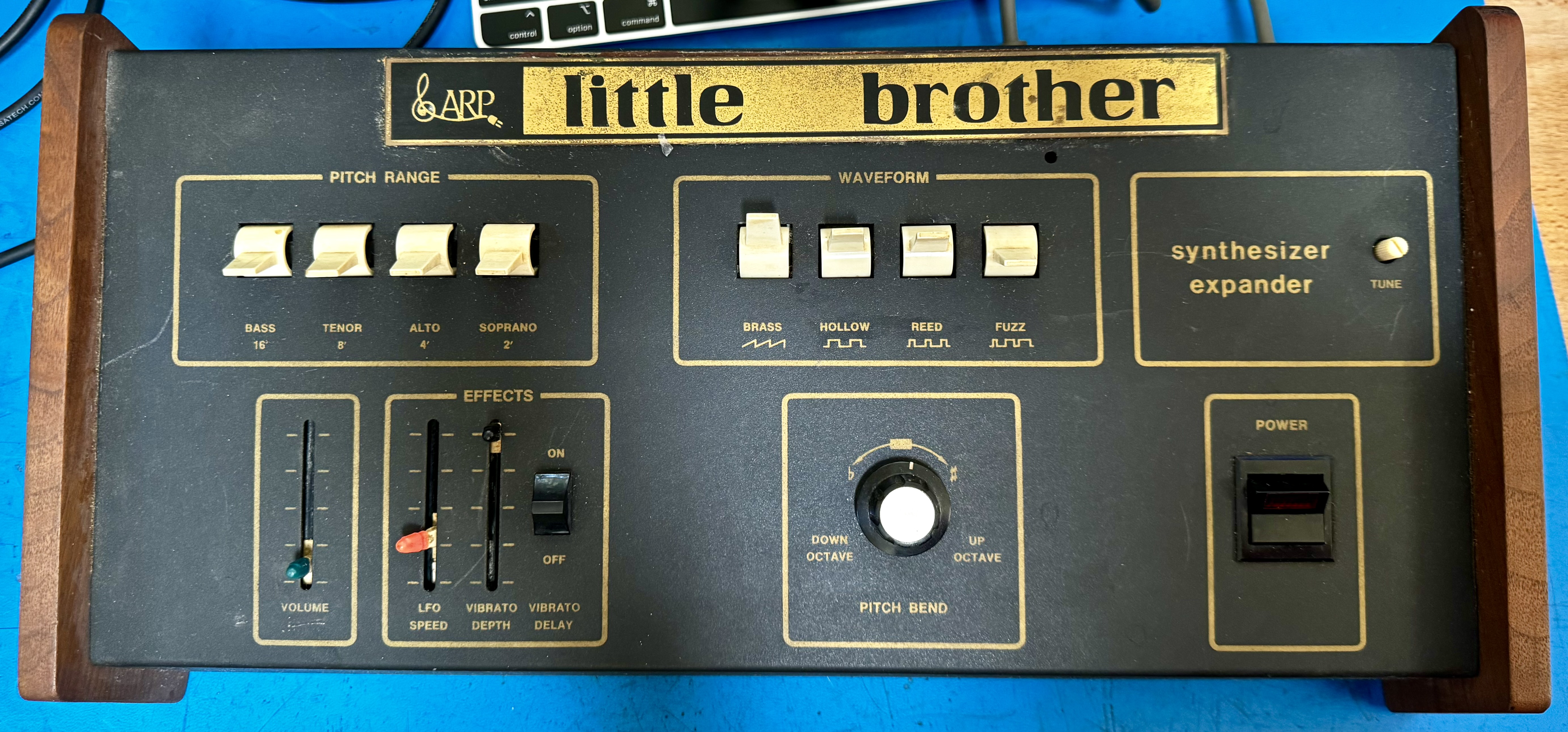
- ARP Little Brother
- Manufacturer: ARP Instruments, Inc.
- Dates: 1975 - 1977

Technical specifications
- Polyphony: Monophonic
- Timbrality: Monotimbral
- Oscillator: 1 square
- LFO: 1 triangle
- Synthesis type: Analog Subtractive
- Filter: None
- Storage memory: none
- Effects: none

Input/output
- Keyboard: none
- External control: CV/Gate, ARP system interface

The ARP Little Brother, produced from 1975 to 1977, is a keyboardless monophonic expander module, sold as an add-on for another ARP synthesizer. It was controlled by connecting the control voltage (CV) output of an ARP synthesizer's keyboard to the Little Brother's CV input.

The Little Brother had a single voltage controlled oscillator (VCO) with selectable waveforms, and a sub-octave divider that could produce up to three additional tones simultaneously at -1, -2 and -3 octave intervals. It also had an LFO, and a pitch bend/master tuning knob. However, it had no voltage controlled filter (VCF), voltage controlled amplifier (VCA) or envelope generator (EG or ADSR). When used with other ARP synths to "fatten up" their sounds, the Little Brother's audio output had to be patched into the external audio input of its companion synthesizer, essentially adding an extra VCO and LFO to the system.

It was commonly sold with the ARP Axxe, and was given away for free with the purchase of an ARP Odyssey during a summer 1976 promotion. However, it could be used with any analog synthesizer that had the necessary 1v/octave CV output and external audio input connections.
