= Vistoron =

Studio album by Kaku P-Model
- Released: October 7, 2004
- Studio: Studio WIRESELF 2002 Solar Version
- Genre: Synthpop; EBM
- Length: 37:18
- Label: Chaos Union, TESLAKITE CHTE-0030
- Producer: Susumu Hirasawa

Kaku P-Model chronology
Vistoron (2004)	Gipnoza (2013)

Vistoron (ビストロン, Bisutoron) is the first album by Kaku P-Model, a solo continuation of P-Model led by Susumu Hirasawa.

== Overview ==
Vistoron has a dystopian theme, something that was especially prominent in Hirasawa's work for a number of years starting with 2003's Blue Limbo. The album's science fiction concept story is about mass media sending out "Anti-Vistoron" to show people false images of the world, and Hirasawa's investigation of the mysterious "Ashu-on" lifeform.

== Track listing ==
All tracks are written by Susumu Hirasawa.

No.	Title	Length
1.	"Dual Perspective 3" (二重展望3 Nijū Tenbō 3) (instrumental)	1:42
2.	"Big Brother"	3:22
3.	"Anti-Vistoron" (アンチ・ビストロン Anchi-Bisutoron)	3:47
4.	"Adore me, I am TV" (崇めよ我はTVなり Agameyo ware wa TV nari)	4:10
5.	"Cruise Psyclaon" (巡航プシクラオン Junkō Pushikuraon)	4:12
6.	"Darkness π duai" (暗黒πドゥアイ Ankoku pai duai)	3:27
7.	"Para-Uniphs" (パラ・ユニフス Para-Yunifusu)	3:06
8.	"Space hook"	3:44
9.	"Vistoron" (ビストロン Bisutoron)	5:03
10.	"Antimonesia" (アンチモネシア Anchimoneshia)	4:45

- "Adore me, I am TV" contains a sample of the 2002 State of the Union Address, delivered by then-President of the United States of America George W. Bush.
- "Cruise Psyclaon" contains a sample of "Cultivation" by Susumu Hirasawa, from the album Paranoia Agent Original Soundtrack.
- "Vistoron" contains a sample of min'yō-style singing, performed by Hiroshi Harada, on "Skeleton Coast Park" by Susumu Hirasawa, from the album Water in Time and Space.
