= Armand Marquiset =

French philanthropist, humanitarian, and nobleman

Armand Marquiset (September 29, 1900, in the château of Montguichet near Paris – July 14, 1981, in Burtonport, Ireland) was a French philanthropist, humanitarian and nobleman.

He founded several non-profit organizations, for example Les petits frères des Pauvres (Little Brothers, 1946), a large French charity that takes care of elderly people, and Frères des Hommes (1965).
