= The Sisters, Victoria =

Settlement in Victoria, Australia

The Sisters
- Town
- Coordinates: 38°11′53″S 142°46′12″E
- Country: Australia
- State: Victoria
- LGA: Shire of Moyne

Government
  - State electorate: Polwarth
  - Federal division: Wannon

Population
  - Total: 110 (2021 census)
- Time zone: UTC+10 (AEST)
  - Summer (DST): UTC+11 (AEST)
- Postcode: 3265

The Sisters is a locality in the Shire of Moyne, Victoria, Australia. It is located about 38 km north east of Warrnambool and about 17 km northwest of Terang. At the 2021 census, The Sisters had a population of 110.

It was first settled in 1860. The name refers to two tuff rings of scoria cones and mounds in a cratered area of the zone. The tallest hill is 203 metres. It consists of mostly dairy farms and had an old hall that was a school. The school was closed during the 1960s early 1970s.
