= Big Brother China =

Chinese reality television series

- Also known as: Housemates, Let's Stay Together
- Mandarin Chinese: 室友一起宅
- Genre: Reality television
- Presented by: Zhou Wentao (Live final); Yang Ruilei (Live final)
- Voices of: Ma Rui as "Brother Zhai" (宅哥, Zhágē)
- Country of origin: China
- Original language: Chinese

Production
- Executive producer: Rebecca De Young
- Producer: Endemol Shine China
- Production locations: Lonavala, Mumbai, India; Beijing, China (Live final)
- Running time: 45 minutes (approx.)

Original release
- Network: Youku; Tudou

Housemates, Let's Stay Together: Pilot Season
- No. of days: 12
- No. of housemates: 10
- Winner: Tan Xiangjun
- Runner-up: Xie Sitong
- No. of episodes: 13

Release
- Original release: 21 November 2015 – 6 January 2016

Additional information
- Filming dates: 7 September – 19 September 2015

Big Brother China, also known in China as Housemates, Let's Stay Together (Chinese: 室友一起宅 Shìyǒuyìqǐzhái), was the Chinese version of the international reality television franchise Big Brother created by producer John de Mol Jr..

The show is produced by Endemol Shine China in partnership with Youku Tudou Inc.. The first to be broadcast is called the "Pilot Season", which was pre-recorded in India in September 2015. The show was exclusively broadcast on online video and streaming platforms Youku and Tudou from 21 November 2015. It was updated twice a week for about six weeks, and the finale took place in the form of a live broadcast on 6 January 2016, in which Tan Xiangjun was declared the winner and won an endorsement contract to be a contestant on the first official season worth CNY 10 million.

The pilot season was intended to evaluate audience interest ahead of a potential first full season. However, no further seasons were produced.

== Development ==
Big Brother China was announced by Endemol and Youku Tudou Inc. on 28 October 2014 in a press release. The project was to be developed through Endemol Shine China, a new division established in Beijing. The announcement described "a ten-week series scheduled to debut in early 2015, with production expected to begin shortly afterwards".

=== Localization ===
As part of its localisation strategy, Youku Tudou decided to give the Chinese version a different title rather than retain the name of the original "Big Brother" or directly translating it into "老大哥". According to Xu Shundong, the senior executive at Heyi Group's variety entertainment division, marketing research indicated that the original title did not provide Chinese audiences with a strong sense of cultural identification. The naming process involved public suggestions and considered concepts related to shared living, competition, observation and interpersonal relationships. The producers eventually chose a popular internet slang word at the time, "zhái" (Chinese: 宅), associated with staying at home, as the central concept, and combined it with "together" to form a title centred on shared living.

The title Housemates, Let's Stay Together (Chinese: 室友一起宅) was officially selected in August 2015. Xu explained that the name was intended to emphasise companionship, positive relationships and the experience of living together while facing competition, rather than focusing primarily on interpersonal conflict like in some other foreign editions.

=== Production ===
The show was filmed in India, at a former industrial factory on the outskirts of Lonavala, Mumbai, where the Indian versions, Bigg Boss Hindi and Bigg Boss Kannada were filmed. The production used the resources, infrastructure and experience of Endemol Shine India, which already produced several editions of the Bigg Boss franchise.

Rebecca De Young, who previously served as a producer on the British version for over ten years prior to working on the Chinese adaptation, was named executive producer. A 400-member Indian production crew worked on the show, while the Chinese team provided creative directors, story editors and remote camera operators. The set and interior design were redecorated to suit Chinese audiences.

The pilot season was filmed over the course of twelve days from 7 to 19 September 2015 and ended with a separate live finale on 6 January 2016. It was the first Big Brother adaptation to be broadcast exclusively online, on Youku and Tudou.

The production was first conceived as an online pilot season rather than a full television season. Producer Xu Shundong said that the show would first be released online and a satellite television broadcast might follow later if it received a positive response.

=== Reception and future developments ===
The show received positive feedback at a media preview conference, held in Beijing on 18 November 2015, more than 20 media organisations attended the event, where the production quality was praised. The live finale was held on 6 January 2016, with Youku and Tudou broadcasting the event simultaneously. The producers described it as the first globally simulcast live finale of the show.

The pilot season was intended to evaluate its performance before the possible development of a full season of Big Brother China. In March 2016, Big Brother China was still listed in Endemol Shine's format deals in China in ContentAsia's Formats Outlook. However, no future season was confirmed or produced.

== Format ==
It featured ten Housemates, five men and five women, who lived together in a specially designed house without access to their phones, social media or the internet. Their activities were recorded by cameras and microphones, while a figure known as "Brother Zhai" (Chinese: 宅哥 Zhái Gē)) assigned tasks and interacted with the Housemates.

The Housemates competed in tasks during their stay in the House. They also nominated two fellow Housemates for eviction. The Housemates then voted to save one of the nominees, with the nominee receiving the fewest save votes being evicted. The winner was decided by a public vote during the live finale.

== Housemates ==
Name	Nickname	Age	Occupation	Hometown/residence	Day entered	Day exited	Status
Tan Xiangjun 谭湘君	君君	21	Model, actress	Dazhou, Sichuan	1	12	Winner
Xie Sitong 解斯童	斯童	24	Model	Beijing	1	12	Runner-up
Yang Xiaolou 杨小楼	BoYoung	27	Tattoo artist, Rapper	Fushun, Liaoning	1	12	Third Place
Wang Manyu 王曼玉	Blue	23	Singer	Beijing	1	12	Evicted
Deng Huanyu 邓环宇	Rocky/肉肉	24	Boat crew	Shenyang, Liaoning	1	12	Evicted
Jiang Chenchen 江陈晨	神童	24	Dancer	Beijing	1	12	Evicted
Han Chenbin 韩陈彬	喃喃	25	Model, actor	Beijing	1	12	Evicted
Wang Linyi 王琳旖	小兔子	N/A	Actress	N/A	1	9	Evicted
Liu Sibo 刘思博	小仙女	26	Actress	Beijing	1	9	Evicted
Morpheus 墨菲斯	大叔	39	Pickup artist, dating coach	Beijing	1	6	Evicted

== Summary ==
Day 1	Entrances	Deng Huanyu, Han Chenbin, Jiang Chenchen, Xie Sitong, Liu Sibo, Morpheus, Tan Xiangjun, Wang Linyi, Wang Manyu, Yang Xiaolou entered the House.
Day 1	Tasks	Rotating Bottle A housemate turns the bottle every round and then waits for the bottle to stop. The two people the bottle is pointing at open an envelope, which has a task inside it. Rotating Bottle tasks: Recipient(s) / Task / Answer / Result; Tan Xiangjun, Jiang Chenchen / Select one opposite-sex housemate to do Kabedon for 30 seconds. They can't laugh, and the countdown is done by someone else. / —N/a / Passed; Han Chenbin / Ask: Kiss, marry, or evict? / Kiss: Morpheus. Marry: Liu Sibo. Evict: Tan Xiangjun / Passed; Wang Linyi, Yang Xiaolou / Choose a housemate of the opposite sex. Stand on each other's feet and dance cheek to cheek. / —N/a / Passed; Wang Manyu, Yang Xiaolou / Hold an opposite-sex housemate on your left like a princess and squat 10 times. / —N/a / Passed; Xie Sitong, Han Chenbin / Mouth to mouth and put the paper on the table. / —N/a / Passed; Liu Sibo / Who do you think is the most fake and the most real? / Most real: Xie Sitong. Most fake: Morpheus / Passed; Deng Huanyu, Liu Sibo / Lay down and do push-ups 10 times. / —N/a / Passed; Genius Bartender: according to the taste of RIO cocktail's flavor, select juices and cocktails, mix a taste closed cocktail, their partner will try later to guess which flavor of RIO is. If they guessed right will win back their own luggage.
Day 2	Tasks	Yes / No Housemates must say yes to everything told by Brother Zhai. They will only be given two chances to say no. If all of them pass their tasks, they will win back their luggage. They passed this task, then got back their luggage. Yes / No tasks: Recipient(s) / Task / Decision / Result; All housemates / Do you want to jump until Brother Zhai is satisfied? / Yes / Passed; Wang Linyi, Morpheus / Do you want to jump into the pool immediately? / Yes / Passed; Deng Huanyu / Follow Han Chenbin after leaving the Diary Room. Every time he touches his hair, press the electric shock pen and enjoy the electricity. / Yes / Passed; Wang Manyu / Do you want to play Big Fish Harmonica? / Yes / Passed; Han Chenbin / Do you want to play as a saboteur, secretly obstructing others to compete in tomorrow's task? / Yes / Passed; Liu Sibo / Do you want to put on some new clothes provided by Brother Zhai? / Yes / Passed; Jiang Chenchen / Eating SPECIAL snacks? / No / Passed; Tan Xiangjun / Eating SPECIAL snacks? / Yes / Passed
Day 3	Tasks	Two-day task: Crazy little angel Throughout the next two days, these babies will cry from time to time. As the baby's parents, they need to do three things such as feeding, changing diapers, and coaxing them to sleep. Pairs: Jiang Chenchen and Wang Manyu, Yang Xiaolou and Liu Sibo, Tan Xiangjun and Han Chenbin, Wang Linyi and Deng Huanyu, Morpheus and Xie Sitong: Han Chenbin's secret mission: Secretly cause trouble, leading to his partner in the task ending up in the bottom of the rankings. If he completes his secret mission, they can compete for a place with the first-ranking partner.; Sleep little angel: Each pair makes a lullaby, and performs it.; Make baby cribs: First place: Wang Linyi and Deng Huanyu. Second place: Jiang Chenchen and Wang Manyu. Third place: Yang Xiaolou and Liu Sibo. Fourth place: Morpheus and Xie Sitong. Fifth place: Tan Xiangjun and Han Chenbin.
Day 4	Tasks	Wang Manyu and Morpheus must do dirty laundry for other housemates. Two-day task: Crazy little angel: Change diapers while blindfolded; In each pair, the male housemate is blindfolded and made to change the diaper, while the female housemate needs to use her voice to guide him, according to an example picture. The fastest pair wins. Deng Huanyu and Wang Linyi are winners. Han Chenbin failed his secret mission because their pair wasn't the lowest ranking one. Immunity challenge Standing on a wooden stick and holding a rope over the head. The one that lasts for the longest time wins. Winner: Yang Xiaolou. He must give two immunities. As the winning pair of the Crazy little angel task, either Deng Huanyu or Wang Linyi will have a chance to receive immunity. Another one should give it to other housemates, including himself.
Day 4	Punishment	During today's task, Han Chenbin revealed his secret mission to Tan Xiangjun. He will write "I will never break the rules." (in Chinese) ten times on five whiteboards as punishment.
Day 5	Tasks	Silence Party When the music starts, two housemates must arrive on the dance floor within 30 seconds. They must ensure they have danced for more than 11 minutes and 30 seconds at a time. If they take less than 11 minutes and 30 seconds, they have failed the task.
Day 5	Nominations	Deng Huanyu and Wang Linyi received immunities from Yang Xiaolou. They were both safe from being nominated in the first round of nominations.; Housemates were nominated for the first time. Liu Sibo and Morpheus received the most nominations and were therefore nominated for eviction.
Day 6	Tasks	Magic Potion Choose one of the bottles of "magic potion" to drink. According to other people's reactions, guess the magic potion you chose.
Day 6	Exits	Morpheus was the first housemate to be evicted.
Day 7	Tasks	Who is the killer The killer (Jiang Chenchen) and two detectives (Deng Huanyu and Xie Sitong) were both decided by a random draw. When the housemates were killed, they were sent to jail. Deng Huanyu and Xie Sitong must use cooperation to find the killer. In the end, if they successfully figure out the killer, they will receive immunities. Jiang Chenchen needs to follow the arrangements to kill the target. If he completes the task, he can also receive immunity.
Day 7	Nominations	Deng Huanyu, Jiang Chenchen and Xie Sitong were nominated by a random draw.
Day 8	Tasks	Who is the killer After the speech, Deng Huanyu and Xie Sitong were given one minute to discuss. They had to give two suspects, which were Jiang Chenchen and Wang Manyu. Then the jury voted (Jiang vs Wang, 2:3), but the result was for reference only. Then they must give a final answer, which was Wang Manyu. This was incorrect, so Jiang Chenchen passed the task and won immunity.
Day 8	Nominations	Based on the result of the 'Who is the killer' task, Jiang Chenchen won immunity. Deng Huanyu and Xie Sitong had to select another housemate to nominate. They chose Liu Sibo.
Day 9	Tasks	Ignore Task Ignore everything from other housemates.
Day 9	Exit	Double Eviction: Liu Sibo was the second housemate to be evicted, and Deng Huanyu was the third.
Day 10	Tasks	Each housemate had to stay in a box for as long as they can. The winner of the task receives a voice letter from their family. They split into two groups: Jiang Chenchen, Wang Manyu & Han Chenbin against Yang Xiaolou, Xie Sitong & Wang Linyi, with Tan Xiangjun as the judge. There was a tie between the two teams, so they all got their voice letters. Morpheus and Deng Huanyu both returned for the task.
Day 11	Tasks	Everyone was required to write two letters anonymously. One for their favorite person, and one for the person they can't live in harmony with. They must read these letters front of everyone later.
Day 12	Events	Housemates prepared for the Awards Ceremony in the afternoon. Awards Ceremony: Awards / Winner; The Most "Sweet Blonde" / Tan Xiangjun; Merit Housemate / Han Chenbin; The Most "Heartless" / Han Chenbin, Wang Linyi; The Best Fantasy "Couple" / Xie Sitong and Yang Xiaolou; The Most "Down to earth – No moral integrity" / Han Chenbin; The Most "Fashionable" Model / Wang Manyu; The Most "Arrogant" princess / Tan Xiangjun; The Best "Victoria's Secret" Award / Jiang Chenchen; The Best "Zhuge Liang" Award / Wang Manyu
Day 12	Nominations	Jiang Chenchen, Wang Linyi, Wang Manyu, Xie Sitong
Day 12	Exit	Wang Linyi was the fourth housemate to be evicted.
Final 6 January	Events	The final live show took place in Beijing. The show has divided into three rounds.
Final 6 January	Return	All housemates returned for the live show. According to a popularity poll, one of the first four evicted housemates were allowed to return to the game and compete with three advanced housemates from the first round. Then one of the eight evicted housemates will return to the game and compete with the two advanced housemates from the second round for the final prize.
Final 6 January	Final result	Tan Xiangjun was announced as the winner.

== Nominations table ==
	Day 5	Day 6	Day 7	Day 8	Day 9		Day 11	Day 12		Votes received
	Day 5	Day 6	Day 7	Day 8	#1	#2	Day 11	Day 12		Votes received
Tan Xiangjun	Morpheus, Liu Sibo	Liu Sibo	No nominations	No nominations	Xie Sitong, Deng Huanyu	Deng Huanyu	Xie Sitong, Han Chenbin	Not eligible	Advanced (Exited; Day 12)	1
Xie Sitong	Morpheus, Liu Sibo	Liu Sibo	No nominations	No nominations	Nominated	Nominated	Jiang Chenchen, Wang Manyu	Nominated	Advanced (Exited; Day 12)	14
Yang Xiaolou	Liu Sibo, Morpheus	Liu Sibo	No nominations	No nominations	Xie Sitong, Deng Huanyu	Deng Huanyu	Jiang Chenchen, Wang Manyu	Not eligible	Advanced (Exited; Day 12)	1
Wang Manyu	Liu Sibo, Morpheus	Morpheus	No nominations	No nominations	Deng Huanyu, Xie Sitong	Xie Sitong	Wang Linyi, Yang Xiaolou	Jiang Chenchen, Wang Manyu, Xie Sitong	Advanced (Exited; Day 12)	4
Jiang Chenchen	Liu Sibo, Morpheus	Morpheus	No nominations	Exempt	Deng Huanyu, Xie Sitong	Xie Sitong	Xie Sitong, Wang Linyi	Nominated	Advanced (Exited; Day 12)	6
Han Chenbin	Morpheus, Liu Sibo	Liu Sibo	No nominations	No nominations	Deng Huanyu, Xie Sitong	Xie Sitong	Xie Sitong, Wang Linyi	Not eligible	Advanced (Exited; Day 12)	2
Wang Linyi	Morpheus, Liu Sibo	Liu Sibo	No nominations	No nominations	Xie Sitong, Deng Huanyu	Xie Sitong	Jiang Chenchen, Wang Manyu	Nominated	Evicted (Day 12)	3
Deng Huanyu	Liu Sibo, Jiang Chenchen	Liu Sibo	No nominations	No nominations	Nominated	Nominated	Evicted (Day 9)			8
Liu Sibo	Morpheus, Jiang Chenchen	Nominated	No nominations	No nominations	Nominated	Evicted (Day 9)				15
Morpheus	Liu Sibo, Han Chenbin	Nominated	Evicted (Day 6)							10
Notes	1, 2	3	4	5	6		7			
Nominated	Liu Sibo, Morpheus		Deng Huanyu, ~~Jiang Chenchen,~~; Liu Sibo, Xie Sitong			Deng Huanyu, Xie Sitong	Jiang Chenchen, Wang Linyi, Wang Manyu, Xie Sitong			
Evicted	None	Morpheus; 2 of 8 votes to save	None		Liu Sibo; 0 of 6 votes to save	Deng Huanyu; 2 of 6 votes to save	None	Wang Linyi; Wang Manyu's choice to evict		

=== The live final ===
	Round 1		Round 2		Round 3	
Tan Xiangjun	Team 2	Evicted (Round 1)			Nominated	Winner (Final Round)
Xie Sitong	Team 2		Advanced	Nominated	Finalist	Runner-up (Final Round)
Yang Xiaolou	Team 2	Evicted (Round 1)	Advanced	Nominated	Finalist	Third place (Final Round)
Wang Manyu	Team 1		Advanced	Nominated	Nominated	Re-evicted (Round 3)
Deng Huanyu	Evicted (Day 9)		Nominated	Nominated	Nominated	Re-evicted (Round 3)
Jiang Chenchen	Team 1		Evicted (Round 1)		Nominated	Re-evicted (Round 3)
Han Chenbin	Team 1	Evicted (Round 1)			Nominated	Re-evicted (Round 3)
Wang Linyi	Evicted (Day 12)		Nominated	Re-evicted (Round 2)	Nominated	Re-evicted (Round 3)
Liu Sibo	Evicted (Day 9)		Nominated	Re-evicted (Round 2)	Nominated	Re-evicted (Round 3)
Morpheus	Evicted (Day 6)		Nominated	Re-evicted (Round 2)	Nominated	Re-evicted (Round 3)
Notes	8, 9	10	11	12	13	14, 15
Nominated	Team 1: Han Chenbin, Jiang Chenchen, Wang Manyu *	Team 1: Jiang Chenchen, Wang Manyu	Deng Huanyu, Liu Sibo, Morpheus, Wang Linyi	Deng Huanyu, Wang Manyu, Xie Sitong, Yang Xiaolou	Deng Huanyu, Han Chenbin, Jiang Chenchen, Liu Sibo, Morpheus, Tan Xiangjun, Wang Linyi, Wang Manyu	Tan Xiangjun, Xie Sitong, Yang Xiaolou
Nominated	Team 2: Tan Xiangjun *, Xie Sitong, Yang Xiaolou	Team 2: Tan Xiangjun, Yang Xiaolou	Deng Huanyu, Liu Sibo, Morpheus, Wang Linyi	Deng Huanyu, Wang Manyu, Xie Sitong, Yang Xiaolou	Deng Huanyu, Han Chenbin, Jiang Chenchen, Liu Sibo, Morpheus, Tan Xiangjun, Wang Linyi, Wang Manyu	Tan Xiangjun, Xie Sitong, Yang Xiaolou
Evicted	Han Chenbin; Wang Manyu's choice to evict	Yang Xiaolou (out of 2) to return	Deng Huanyu; Most votes (out of 4) to return	Deng Huanyu; Fewest points (out of 4) to evict	Tan Xiangjun; Most votes (out of 8) to return	Yang Xiaolou; 58,800 votes (10.73%) (out of 3)
Evicted	Yang Xiaolou; Tan Xiangjun's choice to evict	Jiang Chenchen; Wang Manyu's choice to evict	Deng Huanyu; Most votes (out of 4) to return	Wang Manyu; Fewest points (out of 4) to evict	Tan Xiangjun; Most votes (out of 8) to return	Xie Sitong; 59,670 votes (10.89%) (out of 3)
Evicted	Tan Xiangjun; Tan Xiangjun's choice to evict	Jiang Chenchen; Wang Manyu's choice to evict	Deng Huanyu; Most votes (out of 4) to return	Wang Manyu; Fewest points (out of 4) to evict	Tan Xiangjun; Most votes (out of 8) to return	Tan Xiangjun; 429,630 votes (78.38%) to win

=== Notes ===
This housemate was given or won immunity for that round.

- ^Note 1: Housemates were required to nominate two housemates for eviction.
- ^Note 2: Deng Huanyu and Wang Linyi received immunities from Yang Xiaolou, therefore immune.
- ^Note 3: Liu Sibo and Morpheus received the most nominations from Day 5, the rest of the housemates voted for whom they wanted to save. The housemate with the fewest votes was evicted.
- ^Note 4: This round of nominations was decided by a random draw.
- ^Note 5: Based on the result of the 'Who is the killer' task, Jiang Chenchen won immunity. Deng Huanyu and Xie Sitong had to select another housemate to nominate. They chose Liu Sibo.
- ^Note 6: Day 9 was a double eviction.
- ^Note 7: Housemates were nominated on Day 11, but who facing eviction was announced on Day 12 at the Awards ceremony. Because Wang Manyu won the "Best Zhuge Liang" award, so only she had the power to vote in this round, although she was also nominated.
- ^Note 8: Live final took place at 8:30 pm on 6 January in Beijing. Votes on the live broadcast website directly decide the winner.
- ^Note 9: For the first round, six advanced housemates split into two teams to compete, in this round, three housemates will be evicted. According to the votes, Tan Xiangjun and Wang Manyu are the leaders of the two teams. The winning team leader (Team 1) will evict 1 housemate, the losing team (Team 2) will evict 2 housemates. As the leader of Team 1, Wang Manyu chose to evict Han Chenbin. As the leader of Team 2, Tan Xiangjun chose to evict Yang Xiaolou and herself.
- ^Note 10: The losing team (Team 2) has a chance to bring back one evicted housemate. If Xie Sitong accepts and passes the special challenge, she will have a chance to bring back one evicted housemate and the winning team will evict 2 housemates.

She accepts and passes the challenge. Yang Xiaolou returned. Then the winning team (Team 1) chose to evict Jiang Chen.

- ^Note 11: For the second round, According to the popularity poll, Deng Huanyu with the most votes returned and compete with three advanced housemates from the first round.
- ^Note 12: After that, two housemates will advance into the final round and two housemates will be evicted. Everyone must write two curse cards. The lowest number curse card will choose the task first. Turn the wheel to select the task, pass the task could cancel half number of cards. If the task failed, then add one card to their game point. After all of the tasks are completed, two housemates with the fewest game points will be evicted. If it is a tie, the shortest time to complete the task wins. Wang Manyu and Deng Huanyu with the fewest game points therefore evicted.
- ^Note 13: For the final round, according to the internet popularity, Tan Xiangjun returned and compete with two advanced housemates from the second round for the final price.
- ^Note 14: The Most Popular Housemate is Deng Huanyu. His popular value reached to 2,130,013,699,801.
- ^Note 15: With the most popular values, Tan Xiangjun is The winner of the pilot season. Her popular value is 429,630.

== Votes ==
All of the "?" Indicating the number was obscured by the host's body.

=== Vote for the winner ===
The vote from the final live broadcast website. All housemates took part in this vote. The winner, runner-up, and third place, were decided between the final three remaining housemates.

Name	Total votes	Final result
Tan Xiangjun 谭湘君	429,630	Winner
Wang Manyu 王曼玉	326,87?	Evicted
Han Chenbin 韩陈彬	302,17?	Evicted
Deng Huanyu 邓环宇	291,20?	Evicted
Morpheus 墨菲斯	87,620	Evicted
Jiang Chenchen 江陈晨	76,080	Evicted
Xie Sitong 解斯童	59,670	Runner-up
Yang Xiaolou 杨小楼	58,800	Third place
Wang Linyi 王琳旖	56,460	Evicted
Liu Sibo 刘思博	56,390	Evicted

=== Round 1 ===
A popular value vote between the six advanced housemates. (Due date:4 Jan.) (Live broadcast website + Weibo)

Name	Total votes
Tan Xiangjun 谭湘君	182,279,763
Wang Manyu 王曼玉	124,223,256
Yang Xiaolou 杨小楼	12,253,760
Jiang Chenchen 江陈晨	5,063,500
Xie Sitong 解斯童	1,794,197
Han Chenbin 韩陈彬	696,737

=== Round 2 ===
A popular value voting between the first four evicted housemates. (Live broadcast website + Weibo)

According to the popularity poll, the housemate with the most votes will return.

Name	Total votes
Deng Huanyu 邓环宇	213,4??,297
Morpheus 墨菲斯	1,988,918
Wang Linyi 王琳旖	522,398
Liu Sibo 刘思博	270,343

=== Round 3 ===
A popular value voting between the five housemates. (Live broadcast website + Weibo)

According to the popularity poll, the housemate with the most votes will return.

Name	Total votes
Tan Xiangjun 谭湘君	407,130
Han Chenbin 韩陈彬	301,920
Jiang Chenchen 江陈晨	66,000
Xie Sitong 解斯童	59,500
Yang Xiaolou 杨小楼	5?,580

== Game points ==
=== Round 1 ===
In two rounds of games, each team must be deducted the number of curse cards they wrote before. These are the final results.

Team	Name	Curse card received	Points	Result
1	Wang Manyu 王曼玉	5	-8	Win
1	Han Chenbin 韩陈彬	0	-8	Win
1	Jiang Chenchen 江陈晨	0	-8	Win
2	Tan Xiangjun 谭湘君	0	-10	Lose
2	Xie Sitong 解斯童	4	-10	Lose
2	Yang Xiaolou 杨小楼	6	-10	Lose

=== Round 2 ===
Everyone must write two curse cards. The person with the least curse cards will choose the task first.

Name	Curse card	Curse card received
Deng Huanyu 邓环宇	Wang Manyu 王曼玉 x2	2
Yang Xiaolou 杨小楼	Wang Manyu 王曼玉 x2	0
Xie Sitong 解斯童	Wang Manyu 王曼玉 x2	0
Wang Manyu 王曼玉	Deng Huanyu 邓环宇 x2	6

After all of the tasks completed, the two housemates with the least game points would be evicted.

Name	Points	Result
Deng Huanyu 邓环宇	−3	Evicted
Wang Manyu 王曼玉	−3	Evicted
Yang Xiaolou 杨小楼	1	/
Xie Sitong 解斯童	0	/
