= Community of the Lamb =

Roman Catholic community

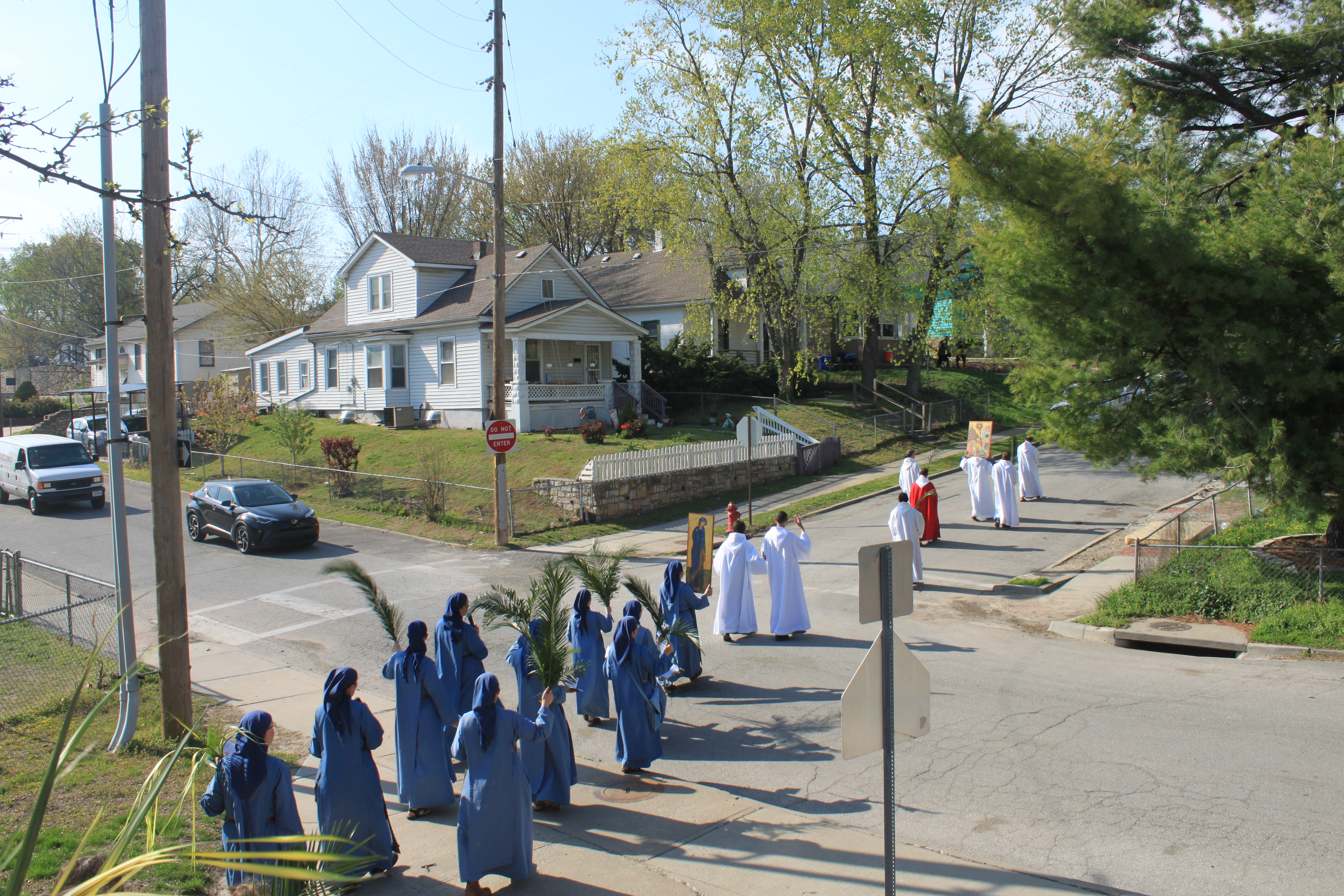
Liturgical Procession in Kansas City, Kansas

The Community of the Lamb is a Roman Catholic religious community consisting of two "public associations of the faithful in itinere"— that is, "on the path to becoming Institutes of Consecrated Life": the "Little Sisters of the Lamb," and the "Little Brothers of the Lamb". Together they form a contemplative and missionary Community dedicated to prayer, the Gospel, and the poor.

== Origins ==
The Community of the Lamb was founded in France by little sister Marie, who was part of a Dominican teaching congregation in Paris. Moved by the poor she encountered on the streets and the overwhelming spiritual thirst during France’s cultural revolution in the late 1960s, little sister Marie was drawn to a life of more radical poverty and prayer. As this call matured and actualized in ministry to university students and friendship with the poor, her religious superior recognized the beginnings of a unique charism and encouraged her in 1979 to formally found a new community that could express and encompass what she and a group of sisters were discovering and experiencing. The Community’s spirituality, rooted in the Gospel, Church fathers, and mendicant orders, took shape as she and the first little sisters lived together in Vézelay. In Vézelay, the first little sisters encountered Brother Jean-Claude O.F.M., a Franciscan brother and priest who became the co-founder of the Community of the Lamb and guided its members to follow the Gospel. He passed away on Easter Sunday, April 5, 2026.

On December 17, 1981, Bishop Michel Kuehn of the Diocese of Chartres formally recognized its foundation. On July 16, 1983, Father Vincent de Couesnongle, then the Master of the Dominican Order, recognized the Community of the Lamb as “a new branch on the tree of the Order of Preachers.” Archbishop Jean Chabbert of the Diocese of Perpignan later erected the little brothers of the Lamb on August 8, 1990. With the little sisters of the Lamb, they form the Community of the Lamb.

In 1996, the Community was placed under the responsibility of Cardinal Christoph Schönborn, O.P., now Archbishop Emeritus of Vienna, Austria. His successor, Archbishop of Vienna Josef Grünwidl, now assumes this responsibility. Today the Community is present in France, Spain, Italy, Austria, Poland, Argentina, Chile, and the United States, with around 170 little sisters and 40 little brothers. Their motherhouse is located in Plavilla, France, in the vicinity of Fanjeaux, the birthplace of the Dominican Order.

== Prayer ==
Following the monastic tradition, the life of the little sisters and little brothers of the Lamb are largely devoted to the celebration of the liturgy through Mass, the office of readings, Eucharistic adoration, and periodic night vigils for Church solemnities and feasts. Their liturgy draws from both the Eastern and Western traditions and is rooted in the Gospel and the writings of the Church fathers. The little sisters and little brothers gather together for daily Mass and additional significant liturgies, but their daily life is otherwise separate.

== Mission ==
The little sisters and little brothers of the Lamb follow in the footsteps of Jesus’ disciples and the mendicant orders, particularly the Dominicans and Franciscans. As missionaries, they go door to door to beg for their daily bread, offering the Gospel to those they encounter. They seek to enrich the lives of lay people, such as the imprisoned, the suffering, immigrants, and those on the peripheries of society, with the Word of God and simple friendship. They also cultivate friendship with the poor by eating with them in soup kitchens. Their little monasteries serve as a place of prayer and hospitality to all, with an emphasis on welcoming the poor and young adults. The Community’s motto is “Wounded, I will never cease to love,” born from the contemplation of Ephesians 2:14-16.

== In the United States ==
In 2008, Archbishop Joseph F. Naumann invited the little sisters of the Lamb to establish their first house in North America in Kansas City, Kansas. In 2013, he invited the little brothers to establish their first house in the same neighborhood. At the invitation of Bishop James Johnston of the Diocese of Kansas City-St. Joseph, Missouri, the little sisters are periodically on mission in St. Joseph, Missouri, since 2023.

On December 17, 2025, Archbishop Emeritus Joseph F. Naumann moved into the St. Joseph House beside the little brothers' monastery. During the blessing of the house on December 30, 2025, he shared about the presence of the Community of the Lamb in the Archdiocese of Kansas City in Kansas: “Their charism is to have a friendship with the poor, to build relationships with them. And it’s beautiful to see how that’s happened and what an impact they’ve had — not just in this neighborhood but on our local church." He regularly joins them for daily Mass at the little sisters’ monastery. "The Little Sisters and Brothers always celebrate the liturgy with great reverence and beauty," he said.

== Criticism from Golias and Breach of Confidentiality from the AVREF Association ==
The Community of the Lamb has been the subject of criticism in France, particularly regarding its internal governance and the exercise of authority by its foundress, Little Sister Marie. Former members and monitoring associations have reported concerns about spiritual pressure, psychological dependence, and insufficient formation within the community.

Additional early criticism was published in 2005 by the French investigative magazine Golias, which raised questions about the community’s internal functioning and the influence of its leadership. Since 1998, the magazine Golias has been officially rebuked by the French Catholic Conference of Bishops (Conférence des évêques de France), reporting that the "mindset and methods of this media - particularly its frequent attacks on the Church’s activities and leadership - lead the authorities of the Bishops’ Conference to question in what sense this publication can lay claim to the title of "Catholic."

In 2025, the association AVREF pretended on its website that the French National Canonical Penal Tribunal (Tribunal Pénal Canonique National) had opened a canonical investigation into the foundress for alleged abuse of authority, following reports transmitted by former members. Nevertheless, this has never been confirmed by the TPCN. Such a proceeding from the TPNC, if there was one, would actually not be public. "As with French Administrative courts, the canonical procedure operates adversarially by filling a brief; there is no public hearing." This constitutes a breach of confidentiality of the investigation, a fundamental violation of the presumption of innocence, and an infringement on the honor of the person suspected.
