= Brothers and Sisters =

Brothers and Sisters may refer to:

== Books ==
- Brothers and Sisters, a 1994 novel by Bebe Moore Campbell
- Brothers and Sisters, a 1929 novel by Ivy Compton-Burnett

== Film and television ==
- Brothers and Sisters (1979 TV series), an American sitcom
- Brothers and Sisters (1980 film), a 1980 British film
- Brothers and Sisters (1992 film), a 1992 Italian film
- Brothers and Sisters (1998 TV series), a British television series starring Sandra Bee, John Adewole, and Mark Arden
- Brothers & Sisters (2006 TV series), an American television series
- "Brothers & Sisters" (Family Guy), episode of Family Guy
- "Brothers and Sisters" (The Green Green Grass), episode of The Green Green Grass
- "Brothers & Sisters" (Arrow), an episode of Arrow

== Music ==
- Brothers and Sisters (album), by The Allman Brothers Band
- Brothers & Sisters, a 2014 album by Soil & "Pimp" Sessions
- Brother, Sister, an album by mewithoutYou
- Brother Sister, an album by the Brand New Heavies

=== Songs ===
- "Brothers and Sisters", a song by Ziggy Marley & the Melody Makers / Ziggy Marley Joy and Blues (1993)
- "Brothers & Sisters" (song), a 1999 single by Coldplay
- "Brothers and Sisters", a song by Blur from Think Tank (2003)
- "Brothers and Sisters", a song by Twin Atlantic from Great Divide (2004)
- "Brothers and Sisters", a song by Joe Kum Yung Memorial Band & Dallas Tamaira from the single Happy Cones (2004)

== See also ==
- Sibling, an individual who has one or both parents in common
- Birth order
- Brother and Sister (disambiguation)
- Sisters & Brothers, a 2011 Canadian film
- The Sisters Brothers (novel) 2011 Western novel
- The Sisters Brothers (film), 2018 Western film
