= Big Sister =

Big Sister may refer to:

- An older sister, see birth order
- Big Sister (brothel), an online brothel in Prague
- "The Big Sister" (Dexter's Laboratory), an episode of Dexter's Laboratory
- "Big Sister," a song by Elvis Costello and the Attractions from Trust
- Big Sister's Island, one of the Sisters' Islands of Singapore
- Big Sisters, part of the Big Brothers, Big Sisters program
- Big Sister (radio), a United States radio soap opera
- Big Sister, an enemy type in the game BioShock 2
- Big Sis, a nickname for Secretary of Homeland Security Janet Napolitano
- The Big Sister (film), a lost 1916 American drama silent film
- Big Sister (foods), a brand of fruit cake and other baked goods in Australia

== See also ==
- Grande Soeur (French: Big Sister), Seychelles; an island
- Big (disambiguation)
- Sister (disambiguation)
- Little Sister (disambiguation)
- Big Brother (disambiguation)
