= Sister (disambiguation) =

A sister is a female sibling.

Sister may also refer to:

== Role or title ==
- Sister, the title of address for a nun
- Sister, a title usually preceding a surname as a way to address a female parishioner in some Protestant church settings
- Sister, a Jehovah's Witness term of address for a female co-religionist
- Sister, a Mormon term of address for a female co-religionist
- Sister, a Muslim term of address for a female co-religionist
- Sister, a female member of a peer group
- Sister, a term of address for a female member of the Rainbow Family of Living Light
- Sister, a member of a sorority
- Nursing sister, a senior female nurse
- Religious sister (Catholic), a female member of certain Christian religious communities similar to but distinct from a nun

== Arts and entertainment ==
=== Film and TV ===
- Sister (2012 film), a Swiss drama film directed by Ursula Meier
- Sister (2014 film), an American drama film directed by David Lascher
- Sister (2018 film), an American stop-motion animated short film by Siqi Song
- Sister (2021 film), a Chinese film about family directed by Yin Ruoxi
- The Sister (TV series) (2020), a British psychological thriller series
- "Sister" (New Girl), an episode in s3 of New Girl, aired in 2014
- "Sister" (comedy sketch), a 2026 parody advertisement aired on Saturday Night Live

=== Music ===
- Sister (American band), an American heavy metal band
- Sister (Swedish band), a Swedish hard rock band

==== Albums ====
- Sister (Dover album), 1995
- Sister (Frost Children album) or the title song, 2025
- Sister (In Solitude album) or the title song, 2013
- Sister (Letters to Cleo album) or the title song, 1998
- Sister (Marbell album) or the title song, 2008
- Sister (Sonic Youth album), 1987
- Sister (Ultraísta album), 2020
- The Sister (EP), by Marissa Nadler, 2012

==== Songs ====
- "Sister" (Porno Graffitti song), 2004
- "Sister" (Sergio & The Ladies song), representing Belgium at Eurovision 2002
- "Sister" (Sister2Sister song), 1999
- "Sister" (S!sters song), representing Germany at Eurovision 2019
- "Miss Celie's Blues" or "Sister", written by Quincy Jones, Rod Temperton and Lionel Richie for the film The Color Purple, 1985
- "Sister", by the Black Keys from El Camino, 2011
- "Sister", by Bros from The Time, 1989
- "Sister", by Caribou from Suddenly, 2020
- "Sister", by the Ex from Turn, 2004
- "Sister", by Icehouse from Icehouse, 1980
- "Sister", by K.Flay from Solutions, 2019
- "Sister", by Lenny Kravitz from Are You Gonna Go My Way, 1993
- "Sister", by Mike McGear from Woman, 1972
- "Sister", by Mumford & Sons, 2008
- "Sister", by the Nixons from Foma, 1995
- "Sister", by Prince from Dirty Mind, 1980
- "Sister", by She Wants Revenge from She Wants Revenge, 2006
- "Sister/Nation", by Brockhampton from Saturation III, 2017

=== Production companies ===
- Sister (production company), a global media production company founded in 2019
- Sister Productions, a French production company founded and run by Julie Paratian

=== Other uses in arts and entertainment ===
- Sister, a 1952 book by Stan and Jan Berenstain
- The Sister (play), a 1769 comedy play by Charlotte Lennox
- Sister Bear, a character, introduced in 1974, from the Berenstain Bears media franchise
- The Sister: The extraordinary story of Kim Yo Jong, the most powerful woman in North Korea, a 2023 biographical book about Kim Yo Jong
- Sister station, or sister channel, in broadcasting, one of a pair of radio or television stations operated by the same company

== Other uses ==
- Sister group, in phylogenetics
- Sister ship
- Amanda Sister (born 1990), South African footballer
- USS Sister (SP-822), a United States Navy tug in commission from 1917 to 1919

== See also ==
- Sisters (disambiguation)
- Sister city
- Little Sister (disambiguation)
- Big Sister (disambiguation)
- Adelpha or sisters, a butterfly genus
- Kakak (Sister), a 2015 Indonesian film
