= Little Sister =

Little Sister may refer to:

== Literature ==
- The Little Sister, a 1949 novel by Raymond Chandler
- Kana: Little Sister, a 1999 Japanese visual novel

== Film and television ==
- The Little Sister (1911 film), a short
- The Little Sister (1914 film), a short starring Tom Mix
- Little Sister (1921 film), a 1921 Italian silent film
- The Little Sister (1986 film), featuring Peter Gerety
- Little Sister (1992 film), a comedy starring Jonathan Silverman and Alyssa Milano
- Little Sister (1995 film), a Dutch film
- Little Sister (1999 film), a Finnish film
- Little Sister (2010 film), directed and written by Richard Bowen
- Little Sister (2016 film), directed and written by Zach Clark
- The Little Sister (2025 film), directed and written by Hafsia Herzi
- "The Little Sister" (Roseanne), a 1989 episode of the TV sitcom Roseanne
- "Little Sister" (Golden Girls episode)

== Music ==
- Little Sister (band), Sly & the Family Stone's background vocalists
- "Little Sister" (Elvis Presley song), a song released by Elvis Presley in 1961, and later covered by Ry Cooder and by Dwight Yoakam
- "Little Sister" (Queens of the Stone Age song)
- "Little Sister", a song by Jewel from Pieces of You
- "Little Sister", a song by the Runaways from Waitin' for the Night
- "Little Sister", a song by Lou Reed from the Get Crazy soundtrack
- "Little Sister", a song by Nico from Chelsea Girl
- "Little Sister", a song by Cheap Trick from Standing on the Edge
- "Bonnie Jean (Little Sister)", by David Lynn Jones
- "Little Sister", a song by Trixie Mattel from One Stone

== Religion ==
- Little Sisters of the Abandoned Elderly, founded in Spain, a Roman Catholic religious congregation
- Little Sisters of the Assumption, a Roman Catholic religious institute
- Little Sisters of Jesus, a Roman Catholic congregation
  - Little Sister Magdeleine of Jesus (1898–1989), founder of the Little Sisters of Jesus
- Little Sisters of the Lamb, a branch of a Roman Catholic religious institute, shaped both by Dominican and by Franciscan spirituality
- Little Sisters of the Poor, founded in France, a Roman Catholic religious institute for women
- Little Sisters of the Sacred Heart, a religious congregation in Montpellier

== Other uses ==
- Little Sisters, an informal name for a group of some of the smaller members of the British Virgin Islands
- Little Sister (BioShock), fictional young girls in BioShock and BioShock 2
- Little Sister's Book and Art Emporium, a bookstore in Vancouver, Canada
  - Little Sisters Book and Art Emporium v Canada (Minister of Justice), a court case regarding freedom of speech involving the bookstore

== See also ==
- Nation's Little Sister, an informal title in the South Korean entertainment industry
- Baby Sister (disambiguation)
- LittleSis, an accountability project of the Public Accountability Initiative
- Lillasyster (Swedish: little sister), a Swedish rock band
- Petite soeur (disambiguation) (French: little sister)
- Mei Mei (disambiguation) (Chinese: 妹妹; lit. 'little younger sister')
