= MTV Italian Music Awards =

MTV Awards
- TRL Awards logo used in 2012.
- Awarded for: Best in Italian Music
- Presented by: MTV Italy
- First award: 2006
- Final award: 2017
- Website: mtv.it/trl

The MTV Awards (known as TRL Awards from 2006 to 2012) were established in 2006 by MTV Italy, awarded to the most popular artists and music videos in Italy. Originally an annual event for the most requested videos and artists on Total Request Live, from 2013 the MTV Awards reflect what MTV Italian viewers consider the best in music, cinema and fashion.

From 2006 to 2010 the show changed its host city every year, and from 2011 to 2016 was set in Florence before moving to Rome in 2017. The awards are presented annually and broadcast live on MTV Italy, and online.

== Host cities ==
Year	Venue	City	Presenter	Date	Backstage host
2006	Piazza del Duomo	Milan	Alessandro Cattelan and Giorgia Surina	March 25, 2006	—N/a
2007	Piazza del Duomo	Milan	Alessandro Cattelan	April 13, 2007	—N/a
2008	Piazza del Plebiscito	Naples	Alessandro Cattelan and Elena Santarelli	May 17, 2008	Carlo Pastore
2009	Piazza Unità d'Italia	Trieste	Carlo Pastore and Elisabetta Canalis	May 16, 2009	Valentina Correani and Gemelli Diversi
2010	Porto Antico	Genoa	J Ax	May 8, 2010	—N/a
2011	Piazza Santa Croce	Florence	Fabrizio Biggio, Francesco Mandelli and Nina Zilli	April 20, 2011	Brenda Lodigiani and Bruno Cabrerizo
2012	Piazzale Michelangelo	Florence	Valentina Correani and Club Dogo	May 5, 2012	—N/a
2013	Piazzale Michelangelo	Florence	Virginia Raffaele, Ubaldo Pantani and Omar Fantini	June 15, 2013	—N/a
2014	Parco delle Cascine	Florence	Chiara Francini, Pif and Alessandro Betti	June 21, 2014	—N/a
2015	Parco delle Cascine	Florence	Emis Killa	June 14, 2015	—N/a
2016	Parco delle Cascine	Florence	Francesco Mandelli	June 19, 2016	—N/a
2017	Piazza del Popolo	Rome	Francesco Gabbani	May 27, 2017	—N/a

== Winners ==
=== 2006 ===
- First Lady: Avril Lavigne
- Man of the Year: Lee Ryan
- Best Group: t.A.T.u.
- Best New Artist: Hilary Duff
- Best Number #1: Lee Ryan - "Army of Lovers"
- Best "Verrei ma non posso": Cast O.C.
- Best Cry Award: Jesse McCartney
- Best Riempi-Piazza: Gemelli DiVersi
- Best TRL City: Milan
- Best Funny Moment: Bloodhound Gang
- Italians Do It Better: Negramaro
- Miglior Cartellone: Most artistic

=== 2007 ===
- First Lady: Hilary Duff
- Man of the Year: Tiziano Ferro
- Best Band: My Chemical Romance
- Best New Artist: Thirty Seconds to Mars
- Best Number #1: Finley "Diventerai una star"
- Best Cry Award: Finley
- Best Riempi-Piazza: Tiziano Ferro
- Italians Do It Better: Finley
- Best Movie: Notte prima degli esami – Oggi
- Best Live Moment: Zero Assoluto (in Siracusa)
- Best TRL History: Nek

=== 2008 ===
Despite the other editions of the TRL Awards that were hosted in Milan, for this year the show was broadcast from Naples.

- First Lady: Avril Lavigne
- Man of the Year: Tiziano Ferro
- Best Band: Tokio Hotel
- Best Cartello: Matteo, Mattia, Francesca & Lorenzo – Florence Thirty Seconds to Mars
- Best New Artist: Sonohra
- Best Riempi-Piazza: Finley
- Best Movie: Come tu mi vuoi
- Best Blockbuster's Couple: Michelle Hunziker and Fabio De Luigi
- Best TRL History: Max Pezzali
- Best Number One: Tokio Hotel – "Monsoon"

=== 2009 ===
This year the show was broadcast from Trieste.

- First Lady: Hilary Duff
- Man Of The Year: Marco Carta
- Best Band: Lost
- Best Riempi-Piazza: Sonohra
- Best Cartello: Jonas Brothers
- Italians Do It Better: Gemelli Diversi
- Best Movie: Twilight
- Best Number One Of The Year: Marco Carta – "La forza mia"
- Best TRL History: Cesare Cremonini
- Best New Artist Presented By MTV Pulse: dARI
- Best Event In Milan: Jonas Brothers
- Playlist Generation: #1 Thirty Seconds to Mars – "A Beautiful Lie"

=== 2010 ===
For the fifth edition, the show was broadcast from Genoa.

- Best New Generation: Broken Heart College
- Best International Act: Justin Bieber
- Best Look: dARI
- Best Movie: Avatar
- Best Fan Club: Lost
- My TRL Best Video: Valerio Scanu – "Per tutte le volte che..."
- Best TRL History: J Ax
- MTV First Lady: Malika Ayane
- MTV Man of the Year: Marco Mengoni
- MTV Best Band: Muse

=== 2011 ===
In 2011 the show was broadcast from Florence.

- Best Look: Avril Lavigne
- Best MTV Show: I soliti idioti
- Best New act: Modà
- Hot&sexy Award: Robert Pattinson
- Too Much Award: Ligabue
- Wonder Woman Award: Lady Gaga
- Superman Award: Fabri Fibra
- Best Band: Thirty Seconds to Mars
- Best Talent Show Artist: Marco Carta
- Italians do it Better: Modà
- TRL History Award: Zero Assoluto
- First Lady Award: Nina Zilli

=== 2012 ===
For the second time, the show was broadcast from Florence.

- Best Look: Justin Bieber
- Best MTV Show: I soliti idioti
- Best New Generation: Emis Killa
- Best New Artist: Danna Paola
- Wonder Woman Award: Laura Pausini
- Superman Award: Marco Mengoni
- Best Band: Modà
- Italians do it better: Emma Marrone
- Best Fans: Big Bang
- Best Tormentone: Michel Teló – "Ai se eu te pego!"
- Best Video: LMFAO featuring Lauren Bennett and GoonRock – "Party Rock Anthem"
- MTV History Award: Subsonica

=== 2013 ===
For the third time, the show was broadcast from Florence.

- Air Action Vigorsol Super Man: Marco Mengoni
- Mirabilandia Best MTV Show: Ginnaste - vite parallele
- Best Tweet: Justin Bieber
- Wonder Woman: Emma
- Best Band: One Direction
- Instavip: Fedez
- LG Twitstar: Emis Killa
- Most Clicked Video: "Call Me Maybe" Lip Dub
- Sport Hero: Carlotta Ferlito
- Best Fan: One Direction – Directioners
- Best Video: Danna Paola – "Aguita"
- Best Hashtag: #italialovesemilia
- Pepsi Best New Artist: Baby K
- Best Energic Video: will.i.am featuring Justin Bieber – "#thatPOWER"
- Best Female Artist from Latin America: Danna Paola
- Best Movie: The Twilight Saga: Breaking Dawn – Part 2
- MTV Rock Icon: Gianna Nannini
- Artist Saga: Marco Mengoni

=== 2014 ===
For the fourth time in a row, the show was broadcast from Florence.

- Superman: Emis Killa
- Best MTV Show: Il testimone
- Twitstar: Marco Mengoni
- Wonder Woman: Alessandra Amoroso
- Best Band: One Direction
- Vogue Eyewear Best Look: Danna Paola
- Diadora Best Dance Crew: Break Da Beat
- Sport Hero: Carlotta Ferlito
- Crodino Twist Best New Generation: Diodato
- Sammontana Best Fan: Marco Mengoni
- Best New Artist: Rocco Hunt
- Best Performance: Michele Bravi
- Best Video: Pharrell Williams – "Happy"
- Best Movie: The Hunger Games: Catching Fire
- Best Artist from the World: Super Junior
- MTV History Award: Giorgia
- Artist Saga: Marco Mengoni

=== 2015 ===
For the fifth time in a row, the show was broadcast from Florence.

- TIM Best New Generation: Santa Margaret
- Best Movie: The Fault in Our Stars
- Top Instagram Star: Justin Bieber
- Best Tormentone: Ellie Goulding "Love Me Like You Do"
- Best Twitstar: Demi Lovato
- MTV Awards Star: Lady Gaga
- Best Artist From The World: Tokio Hotel
- Superman: Marco Mengoni
- Best New Artist: Lorenzo Fragola
- Artist Saga: Marco Mengoni
- Wonder Woman: Alessandra Amoroso
- Pick Up! Best MTV Show: Mario
- Italian Icon J-Ax
- S'AGAPÕ Best Look: Rihanna
- Best Fan: Avril Lavigne
- Best Band: Dear Jack
- Best Video: Tiziano Ferro "Senza scappare mai più"
- Fanta WebStar: iPantellas

=== 2016 ===
For the sixth time in a row, the show was broadcast from Florence.

- TIM Best New Generation: Benji & Fede
- Best Movie: The Hunger Games: Mockingjay – Part 2
- Webstar: Alberico De Giglio
- Best Tormentone: Justin Bieber "Sorry"
- Air Vigorsol Best Fresh Video: Justin Bieber "What Do You Mean?"
- MTV Awards Star: Avril Lavigne
- Best Artist From The World: Big Bang
- Best New Artist: Benji & Fede
- Best Italian Male: Marco Mengoni
- Best Italian Female: Emma
- Best International Band: One Direction
- Best International Male: Justin Bieber
- Best International Female: Ariana Grande
- Best Look: Gigi Hadid
- Best MTV New Generation: Jarvis
- Nickelodeon Slimefest Award: Benji & Fede
- Artist Saga: Britney Spears
- Best Fan: One Direction
- Best Performance: The Kolors
- MTV History Award: The Kolors
- MTV Video Awards: Negramaro

=== 2017 ===
After six years in Florence, the broadcast moved to Rome for the first time.

- MTV Awards Star: Benji & Fede
- MTV Rap Icon: Fabri Fibra
- MTV History Award: Paola Turci
- Best Fan: Marco Mengoni
- Best International Male: Justin Bieber
- Best Artist From The World: Enrique Iglesias
- Best International Band: One Direction
- Best Italian Band: Benji & Fede
- Mentos White Always Best Look & Smile: Rihanna
- Best International Female: Ariana Grande
- Best Italian Female: Emma]
- MTV Music Award: Sfera Ebbasta
- Best Video: The Chainsmokers feat. Halsey – "Closer"
- Webstar: Alberico De Giglio
- Best Italian Male: Marco Mengoni
- Best Performance: Michele Bravi
- Artist Saga: Fifth Harmony
- Best New Artist: Ermal Meta
