= List of 2011 box office number-one films in Italy =

This is a list of films which have placed number one at the weekend box office in Italy during 2011.

== Number-one films ==
†	This implies the highest-grossing movie of the year.

#	Date	Film	Gross	Notes
1	January 9, 2011	Che bella giornata †		
2	January 16, 2011	Che bella giornata †		
3	January 23, 2011	Qualunquemente		
4	January 30, 2011	Qualunquemente		
5	February 6, 2011	Femmine contro maschi		
6	February 13, 2011	Femmine contro maschi		
7	February 20, 2011	Femmine contro maschi		
8	February 27, 2011	Manuale d'amore 3		
9	March 6, 2011	Manuale d'amore 3		
10	March 13, 2011	Rango		
11	March 20, 2011	Escort in Love		
12	March 27, 2011	Nessuno mi può giudicare		
13	April 3, 2011	Nessuno mi può giudicare		
14	April 10, 2011	The Next Three Days		
15	April 17, 2011	Rio		
16	April 24, 2011	Rio		
17	May 1, 2011	Thor		'
18	May 8, 2011	Fast Five		
19	May 15, 2011	Fast Five		
20	May 22, 2011	Pirates of the Caribbean: On Stranger Tides		
21	May 29, 2011	Pirates of the Caribbean: On Stranger Tides		
22	June 5, 2011	Pirates of the Caribbean: On Stranger Tides		
23	June 12, 2011	X-Men: First Class		
25	June 26, 2011	Cars 2		
26	July 3, 2011	Transformers: Dark of the Moon		
27	July 10, 2011	Transformers: Dark of the Moon		
28	July 17, 2011	Harry Potter and the Deathly Hallows – Part 2		
29	July 24, 2011	Harry Potter and the Deathly Hallows – Part 2		
30	July 31, 2011	Harry Potter and the Deathly Hallows – Part 2		
31	August 7, 2011	Captain America: The First Avenger		
32	August 14, 2011	Mr. Popper's Penguins		
33	August 21, 2011	Horrible Bosses		
34	August 28, 2011	Kung Fu Panda 2		
35	September 4, 2011	Kung Fu Panda 2		
36	September 11, 2011	Super 8		
37	September 18, 2011	The Smurfs		
38	September 25, 2011	The Smurfs		
39	October 2, 2011	The Smurfs		
40	October 9, 2011	Ex: Amici come prima		
41	October 16, 2011	The Three Musketeers		
42	October 23, 2011	Matrimonio a Parigi		
43	October 30, 2011	La peggior settimana della mia vita		
44	November 6, 2011	I soliti idioti		
45	November 13, 2011	I soliti idioti		
46	November 20, 2011	The Twilight Saga: Breaking Dawn - Part 1		
47	November 27, 2011	The Twilight Saga: Breaking Dawn - Part 1		
48	December 4, 2011	Midnight in Paris		
49	December 11, 2011	Midnight in Paris		
50	December 18, 2011	Sherlock Holmes: A Game of Shadows		
51	December 25, 2011	Sherlock Holmes: A Game of Shadows		
52	January 1, 2012	Puss in Boots		
