= Grande Fratello season 12 =

Grande Fratello
- Season 12
- Presented by: Alessia Marcuzzi
- No. of days: 161
- No. of housemates: 36
- Winner: Sabrina Mbarek
- Runner-up: Gaia Elide Bruschini

Release
- Original network: Canale 5
- Original release: 24 October 2011 – 1 April 2012

Season chronology
- ← Previous; Season 11 Next → Season 13

Grande Fratello 12 was the twelfth season of the Italian version of the reality show franchise Big Brother. The show premiered on 24 October 2011 and concluded on 1 April 2012. Alessia Marcuzzi returned as the main host of the show. The house had been radically renewed from the last season. The winner of the season, Sabrina Mbarek received a €240,000 grand prize.

== Housemates ==
| Housemates | Age | Birthplace | Occupation | Day entered | Day exited | Status |
|---|---|---|---|---|---|---|
| Sabrina Mbarek | 21 | Udine | Student | 78 | 161 | Winner |
| Gaia Elide Bruschini | 23 | Rome | Model and hostess | 1 | 161 | Runner-up |
| Patrick Ray Pugliese | 34 | Teheran, Iran | TV personality, Grande Fratello season 4 housemate | 113 | 161 | 3rd Place |
| Franco Giusti | 30 | Rome | Physiotherapist | 50 | 161 | 4th Place |
| Martina Pascutti | 21 | Turin | Photomodel | 29 | 161 | 5th Place |
| Armando Avellino | 25 | Catania | Architect | 29 | 154 | 26th Evicted |
| Ilenia Pastorelli | 25 | Rome | Student | 1 | 154 | 25th Evicted |
| Vito Mancini | 26 | Parma | Student | 29 | 147 | 24th Evicted |
| Kevin Cagnardi | 20 | Borgosesia | Unemployed | 78 | 147 | 23rd Evicted |
| Cristina Del Basso | 24 | Varese | Showgirl, actress and model, Grande Fratello season 9 housemate | 113 | 140 | 22nd Evicted |
| Valentina "Vale" Marconi | 32 | Quarata | Butcher | 120 | 140 | 21st Evicted |
| Valentina Lanotte | 22 | Modugno | Showroom business owner | 78 | 133 | 20th Evicted |
| Floriana Messina | 22 | Potenza | Student | 1 | 133 | 19th Evicted |
| Ferdinando Giordano | 31 | Salerno | TV personality, Grande Fratello season 11 housemate | 113 | 127 | 18th Evicted |
| Gaetano De Robertis | 32 | Bari | Event organizer | 78 | 125 | Walked |
| Giusy Muscia | 25 | Niscemi | Traveller | 78 | 120 | 17th Evicted |
| Enrica Maria Saraniti | 23 | Catania | Psychologist | 8 | 120 | 16th Evicted |
| Fabrizio Conti | 31 | Viareggio | Tattoo artist | 50 | 113 | 15th Evicted |
| Amedeo Aterrano | 23 | Naples | Salesman and model | 1 | 106 | 14th Evicted |
| Chiara Giorgiani | 22 | Milan | Public relations | 1 | 99 | 13th Evicted |
| Daniel Mkongo | 21 | Sorengo, Switzerland | Model, Secret Story season 5 housemate | 78 | 92 | Ejected |
| Rudolf Mernone | 23 | Rome | Rugby player | 1 | 92 | Walked |
| Monica Sirianni (†) | 25 | Sydney, Australia | English teacher | 64 | 92 | 12th Evicted |
| Luca Di Tolla | 34 | Eboli | Student and former scientific informant | 1 | 85 | 11th Evicted |
| Yassine Mokdad Mamaar | 24 | Gavardo | Dancer and personal trainer | 50 | 78 | 10th Evicted |
| Caterina Siviero | 25 | Mestre | Dental Hygienist | 1 | 71 | 9th Evicted |
| Kiran Maccali | 25 | Vythiri, India | Farmer | 1 | 64 | 8th Evicted |
| Adriana Peluso | 21 | Salerno | Rhythmic gymnastics teacher | 1 | 57 | 7th Evicted |
| Leone Gucciardini | 27 | Florence | Waiter | 1 | 50 | 6th Evicted |
| Sofia D'Altrui | 23 | Pescara | Student and receptionist | 1 | 43 | 5th Evicted |
| Danilo Novelli | 22 | Bari | Bartender | 1 | 38 | Walked |
| Mirko D'Arpa | 31 | Rome | Real estate agent | 8 | 37 | Walked |
| Valeria Molin Predel | 34 | Bolzano | Student and former ice hockey player | 1 | 36 | 4th Evicted |
| Filippo Pongiluppi | 30 | Rimini | Hotelier | 1 | 29 | 3rd Evicted |
| Claudia Letizia | 32 | Pompei | Burlesque performer | 1 | 22 | 2nd Evicted |
| Mario Ermito | 20 | Brindisi | Model | 1 | 15 | 1st Evicted |

=== The Invaders ===
On February 13, 2012, Alessia Marcuzzi communicated to viewers that, from that moment on, three former housemates (with the title of "Invaders") would re-enter in the competition with the aim of hindering the path of the current competing housemates towards final victory, namely, Patrick Ray Pugliese (GF4), Cristina Del Basso (GF9) and Ferdinando Giordano (GF10); in fact, they entered the 17th week of this edition.

Initially a "second wave" of "Invaders" was planned for the next episode (i.e. for the 18th week), but then the idea was dropped due to the refusal to participate (due to previous work commitments) of the four former housemates contacted by Endemol Italia. The housemates called to take part in the competition were Roberto Mercandalli (GF 8), the couple made up of Veronica Ciardi and Sarah Nile (GF 10) and George Leonard (GF10).

== Nominations table ==
=== Week 2 - week 15 ===
| | Week 2 | Week 3 | Week 4 | Week 5 | Week 6 | Week 7 | Week 8 | Week 9 | Week 10 | Week 11 | | Week 12 | Week 13 | Week 14 | Week 15 | | Nominations received |
|---|---|---|---|---|---|---|---|---|---|---|---|---|---|---|---|---|---|
| Sabrina | Not in House | | | | | | | | | | | Exempt | | Amedeo; Giusy | Not eligible | Giusy; Amedeo | |
| Gaia | Amedeo | Claudia | Luca | Valeria | Vito | Leone | Amedeo | Amedeo; Kiran | Amedeo; Vito | Chiara | Yassine | Luca; Amedeo | Monica; Amedeo | Amedeo; Valentina | Not eligible | Amedeo; Sabrina | |
| Franco | Not in House | | | | | | Exempt | | Amedeo; Caterina | Rudolf | Amedeo | Luca; Martina | Monica; Chiara | Chiara; Kevin | Armando | Martina; Giusy | |
| Martina | Not in House | | | Exempt | Adriana | Gaia | Adriana | Chiara; Kiran | Franco; Amedeo | Ilenia | Yassine | Monica; Franco | Monica; Amedeo | Amedeo; Giusy | Not eligible | Giusy; Valentina | |
| Armando | Not in House | | | Exempt | Kiran | Gaia | Adriana | Kiran; Chiara | Franco; Amedeo | Luca | Amedeo | Amedeo; Monica | Amedeo; Monica | Chiara; Giusy | Franco | Giusy; Valentina | |
| Ilenia | Sofia | Claudia | Filippo | Kiran | Kiran | Kiran | Kiran | Kiran; Chiara | Amedeo; Franco | Gaia | Chiara | Luca; Monica | Chiara; Monica | Chiara; Giusy | Not eligible | Valentina; Kevin | |
| Vito | Not in House | | | Exempt | Sofia | Gaia | Adriana | Chiara; Amedeo | Amedeo; Franco | Rudolf | Luca | Luca; Monica | Monica; Chiara | Chiara; Giusy | Franco | Giusy; Valentina | |
| Kevin | Not in House | | | | | | | | | | | Exempt | | Amedeo; Valentina | Armando | Gaetano; Valentina | |
| Valentina | Not in House | | | | | | | | | | | Exempt | | Amedeo; Giusy | Not eligible | Amedeo; Franco | |
| Floriana | Sofia | Sofia | Mirko | Leone | Kiran | Leone | Amedeo | Martina; Kiran | Caterina; Armando | Enrica | Martina | Martina; Franco | Franco; Amedeo | Amedeo; Valentina | Not eligible | Franco; Sabrina | |
| Gaetano | Not in House | | | | | | | | | | | Exempt | | Amedeo; Kevin | Armando | Kevin; Giusy | |
| Giusy | Not in House | | | | | | | | | | | Exempt | | Amedeo; Gaetano | Not eligible | Amedeo; Franco | |
| Enrica | Exempt | Gaia | Mirko | Kiran | Vito | Leone | Vito | Kiran; Martina | Vito; Franco | Floriana | Martina | Amedeo; Franco | Amedeo; Franco | Amedeo; Valentina | Not eligible | Amedeo; Sabrina | |
| Fabrizio | Not in House | | | | | | Exempt | | Amedeo; Armando | Yassine | Amedeo | Vito; Chiara | Amedeo; Franco | Not eligible | Gaetano | Amedeo; Vito | |
| Amedeo | Sofia | Claudia | Luca | Valeria | Adriana | Gaia | Vito | Vito; Martina | Franco; Armando | Rudolf | Yassine | Luca; Chiara | Chiara; Monica | Chiara; Kevin | Vito | Giusy; Martina | 51 |
| Chiara | Mario | Claudia | Valeria | Valeria | Vito | Leone | Vito | Kiran; Martina | Franco; Caterina | Floriana | Luca | Amedeo; Franco | Amedeo; Franco | Amedeo; Gaetano | Evicted (Day 99) | | 20 |
| Daniel | Not in House | | | | | | | | | | | Exempt | | Ejected (Day 92) | | | N/A |
| Monica | Not in House | | | | | | | | Exempt | | | Vito; Martina | Martina; Vito | Evicted (Day 92) | | | 13 |
| Rudolf | Amedeo | Valeria | Filippo | Valeria | Sofia | Gaia | Amedeo | Chiara; Amedeo | Caterina; Armando | Vito | Martina | Luca; Monica | Monica; Chiara | Walked (Day 92) | | | 0 |
| Luca | Sofia | Gaia | Mirko | Leone | Vito | Gaia | Adriana | Kiran; Vito | Vito; Franco | Armando | Vito | Amedeo; Vito | Evicted (Day 85) | | | | 12 |
| Yassine | Not in House | | | | | | Exempt | | Vito; Amedeo | Fabrizio | Amedeo | Evicted (Day 78) | | | | | 3 |
| Caterina | Mario | Valeria | Valeria | Valeria | Vito | Gaia | Kiran | Kiran; Chiara | Amedeo; Franco | Evicted (Day 71) | | | | | | | 5 |
| Kiran | Mario | Claudia | Valeria | Sofia | Sofia | Gaia | Vito | Chiara; Vito | Evicted (Day 64) | | | | | | | | 18 |
| Adriana | Valeria | Valeria | Valeria | Valeria | Vito | Leone | Amedeo | Evicted (Day 57) | | | | | | | | | 7 |
| Leone | Sofia | Claudia | Luca | Valeria | Sofia | Gaia | Evicted (Day 50) | | | | | | | | | | 7 |
| Sofia | Mario | Claudia | Filippo | Valeria | Vito | Evicted (Day 43) | | | | | | | | | | | 15 |
| Danilo | Valeria | Claudia | Luca | Valeria | Sofia | Walked (Day 38) | | | | | | | | | | | 0 |
| Mirko | Exempt | Claudia | Filippo | Valeria | Vito | Walked (Day 37) | | | | | | | | | | | 4 |
| Valeria | Sofia | Kiran | Caterina | Adriana | Evicted (Day 36) | | | | | | | | | | | | 19 |
| Filippo | Sofia | Gaia | Mirko | Evicted (Day 29) | | | | | | | | | | | | | 4 |
| Claudia | Amedeo | Gaia | Evicted (Day 22) | | | | | | | | | | | | | | 9 |
| Mario | Sofia | Evicted (Day 15) | | | | | | | | | | | | | | | 4 |
| Notes | ^{1} | ^{2} | ^{3} | ^{4} | ^{5} | ^{6} | ^{7} | ^{8} | ^{9} | ^{10} | | ^{10}, ^{11} | ^{10} | ^{10}, ^{12} | ^{10}, ^{13} | | |
| Nominated | Mario; Sofia | Claudia; Gaia | Filippo; Luca; Mirko; Valeria | Kiran; Leone; Valeria | Sofia; Vito | Gaia; Leone | Adriana; Amedeo; Vito | Chiara; Kiran | Amedeo; Armando; Caterina; Franco; Vito | Amedeo; Martina; Yassine | | Amedeo; Luca; Monica | Amedeo; Chiara; Monica | Amedeo; Chiara; Giusy | Amedeo; Franco; Giusy; Sabrina; Valentina | | |
| Walked | none | | | | Mirko; Danilo | none | | | | | | | Rudolf | none | | | |
| Ejected | none | | | | | | | | | | | | Daniel | none | | | |
| Evicted | Mario; 59.19% to evict | Claudia; 79.78% to evict | Filippo; 37.19% to evict | Valeria; 53.60% to evict | Sofia; 59.27% to evict | Leone; 54.35% to evict | Adriana; 55.07% to evict | Kiran; 55.24% to evict | Caterina; 41.78% to evict | Yassine; 66.30% to evict | | Luca; 52.65% to evict | Monica; 38.12% to evict | Chiara; 58.76% to evict | Amedeo; 34.34% to evict | | |
| Survived | Sofia; 40,81% | Gaia; 20,22% | Luca; 25,01% Mirko; 23,27% Valeria; 14,53% | Leone; 26.41% Kiran; 19.99% | Vito; 40.73% | Gaia; 45.65% | Amedeo; 30.98% Vito; 13.95% | Chiara; 44.76% | Vito; 16.86% Armando; 15.35% Franco; 14.04% Amedeo; 11.97% | Martina; 18.85% Amedeo; 14.85% | | Monica; 40.85% Amedeo; 6.50% | Chiara; 35.80% Amedeo; 26.08% | Amedeo; 35.00% Giusy; 6.24% | Valentina; 31.57% Giusy; 15.19% Sabrina; 12.61% Franco; 6.29% | | |

=== Week 16 - final ===
| | Week 16 | | Week 17 | | Week 18 | | | Week 19 | Week 20 | | Week 21 | | Week 22 | | | Week 23 | | Week 24 Final | | Nominations received |
|---|---|---|---|---|---|---|---|---|---|---|---|---|---|---|---|---|---|---|---|---|
| Sabrina | Vito | Gaia; Gaetano | Giusy | Gaia; Valentina | Nominated | Ferdinando | Valentina; Kevin | Ilenia; Gaia | Nominated | Ilenia; Gaia | Nominated | Ilenia; Gaia | Vito | Nominated | Ilenia; Franco | Not eligible | Patrick | Winner (Day 161) | | 41 |
| Gaia | Fabrizio | Sabrina; Gaetano | Gaetano | Sabrina; Valentina | Not eligible | Ferdinando | Sabrina; Valentina | Sabrina; Cristina | Not eligible | Sabrina; Cristina | Not eligible | Sabrina; Patrick | Ilenia | Ilenia | Sabrina; Patrick | Not eligible | Patrick | Runner-Up (Day 161) | | 20 |
| Patrick | Not in House | | Exempt | | Not eligible | | Valentina; Gaia | Floriana; Valentina | Cristina | Gaia; Vale | Nominated | Gaia; Kevin | Martina | Not eligible | Ilenia; Armando | Franco | Sabrina | Third Place (Day 161) | | 13 |
| Franco | Armando | Fabrizio; Enrica | Martina | Enrica; Valentina | Nominated | Ferdinando | Valentina; Martina | Floriana; Sabrina | Vale | Sabrina; Martina | Nominated | Sabrina; Martina | Armando | Patrick | Ilenia; Sabrina | Not eligible | Sabrina | Fourth Place (Day 161) | | 37 |
| Martina | Armando | Fabrizio; Valentina | Not eligible | Valentina; Kevin | Not eligible | Ferdinando | Valentina; Franco | Valentina; Franco | Not eligible | Vale; Sabrina | Not eligible | Franco; Sabrina | Ilenia | Nominated | Sabrina; Franco | Sabrina | Armando | Fifth Place (Day 161) | | 20 |
| Armando | Franco | Fabrizio; Giusy | Franco | Valentina; Enrica | Giusy | Ferdinando | Valentina; Kevin | Floriana; Valentina | Ilenia | Sabrina; Vale | Sabrina; Cristina | Sabrina; Patrick | Ilenia | Franco | Sabrina; Patrick | Franco | Sabrina | Evicted (Day 154) | | 6 |
| Ilenia | Vito | Fabrizio; Enrica | Gaia | Enrica; Valentina | Sabrina | Ferdinando | Valentina; Sabrina | Floriana; Sabrina | Not eligible | Sabrina; Vale | Franco; Patrick | Sabrina; Patrick | Gaia | Armando | Patrick; Franco | Evicted (Day 154) | | | | 3 |
| Vito | Sabrina | Fabrizio; Enrica | Sabrina | Enrica; Valentina | ~~Valentina~~ | Ferdinando | Valentina; Kevin | Floriana; Valentina | Martina | Vale; Cristina | Not eligible | Kevin; Patrick | Sabrina | Nominated | Evicted (Day 147) | | | | | 26 |
| Kevin | Gaia | Gaetano; Martina | Not eligible | Valentina; Sabrina | Not eligible | Ferdinando | Sabrina; Valentina | Sabrina; Cristina | Gaia | Sabrina; Cristina | Not eligible | Sabrina; Patrick | Evicted (Day 147) | | | | | | | 15 |
| Cristina | Not in House | | Exempt | | Not eligible | | Gaia; Kevin | Valentina; Vito | Not eligible | Kevin; Vito | Nominated | Evicted (Day 140) | | | | | | | | 7 |
| Vale | Not in House | | | | | | Exempt | | Not eligible | Martina; Ilenia | Evicted (Day 140) | | | | | | | | | 4 |
| Valentina | Fabrizio | Franco; Martina | Nominated | Martina; Franco | Not eligible | Cristina | Gaetano; Sabrina | Armando; Sabrina | Nominated | Evicted (Day 133) | | | | | | | | | | 35 |
| Floriana | Enrica | Franco; Gaetano | Enrica | Franco; Sabrina | Franco | Patrick | Franco; Sabrina | Cristina; Franco | Evicted (Day 133) | | | | | | | | | | | 5 |
| Ferdinando | Not in House | | Exempt | | Not eligible | Nominated | Martina; Sabrina | Evicted (Day 127) | | | | | | | | | | | | 10 |
| Gaetano | Armando | Kevin; Giusy | Not eligible | Valentina; Kevin | Not eligible | Ferdinando | Valentina; Sabrina | Walked (Day 125) | | | | | | | | | | | | 9 |
| Giusy | Kevin | Franco; Sabrina | Not eligible | Sabrina; Franco | Nominated | Ferdinando | Evicted (Day 120) | | | | | | | | | | | | | 16 |
| Enrica | Floriana | Franco; Gaetano | Kevin | Franco; Sabrina | Evicted (Day 120) | Patrick | Evicted (Day 120) | | | | | | | | | | | | | 7 |
| Fabrizio | Gaia | Franco; Martina | Evicted (Day 113) | | | | | | | | | | | | | | | | | 5 |
| Amedeo | Evicted (Day 106) | | | | | | | | | | | | | | | | | | | 51 |
| Notes | ^{14} | | ^{15} | none | ^{16} | ^{17}, ^{18} | | none | ^{19} | | ^{20} | | ^{21} | | | ^{22} | | | | |
| Nominated | Fabrizio; Franco; Gaetano | | Valentina | Enrica; Franco; Sabrina; Valentina | Franco; Giusy; Sabrina | Ferdinando; Kevin; Sabrina; Valentina | | Floriana; Sabrina; Valentina | Sabrina; Valentina | Sabrina; Vale | Cristina; Franco; Patrick; Sabrina | Gaia; Kevin; Patrick; Sabrina | Martina; Sabrina; Vito | | Franco; Ilenia; Patrick; Sabrina | Armando; Patrick; Sabrina | | Franco; Gaia; Martina; Patrick; Sabrina | | |
| Walked | none | | | | | Gaetano | | none | | | | | | | | | | | | |
| Evicted | Fabrizio; 54.47% to evict | | Valentina; 75.69% to save | Enrica; 71.08% to evict | Giusy; 12.11% to save | Ferdinando; 39.94% to evict | | Floriana; 74.17% to evict | Valentina; 58.37% to evict | Vale; 65.08% to evict | Cristina; 4.89% to save | Kevin; 42.12% to evict | Vito; 31.95% to save | | Ilenia; 53.12% to evict | Armando; 47.59% to evict | | Martina; 2.18% (out of 5) | Franco; 5.10% (out of 5) | |
| Evicted | Fabrizio; 54.47% to evict | | Valentina; 75.69% to save | Enrica; 71.08% to evict | Giusy; 12.11% to save | Ferdinando; 39.94% to evict | | Floriana; 74.17% to evict | Valentina; 58.37% to evict | Vale; 65.08% to evict | Cristina; 4.89% to save | Kevin; 42.12% to evict | Vito; 31.95% to save | | Ilenia; 53.12% to evict | Armando; 47.59% to evict | | Patrick; 14.96% (out of 5) | Gaia; 24.37% (out of 2) | |
| Survived | Franco; 36.06% Gaetano; 9.47% | | Valentina; 24.31% to evict | Franco; 17.96% Valentina; 5.57% Sabrina; 5.39% | Franco; 25.57% Sabrina; 62.32% | Sabrina; 35.17% Kevin; 13.82% Valentina; 11.07% | | Sabrina; 19.09% Valentina; 6.74% | Sabrina; 41.63% | Sabrina; 34.92% | Franco; 13.93% Patrick; 14.03% Sabrina; 67.15% | Gaia; 27.71% Sabrina; 20.29% Patrick; 9.89% | Martina; 32.45% Sabrina; 35.60% | | Sabrina; 38.31% Franco; 7.39% Patrick; 1.18% | Sabrina; 33.86% Patrick; 18.55% | | Sabrina; 75.63% to win | | |

=== Notes ===
- ^1 The public voted for their favourite housemate. Adriana, Danilo and Kiran were the favourite housemates. The producers decided that only Amedeo, Mario, Leone, Sofia and Valeria could be nominated that week.
- ^2 The producers decided that only Claudia, Gaia, Kiran, Sofia and Valeria could be nominated that week.
- ^3 This week the producers decided that every housemate could be nominated.
- ^4 The producers decided that only Adriana, Kiran, Leone, Sofia and Valeria could be nominated that week. Armando, Martina and Vito were immune as they were new housemates.
- ^5 The producers decided that only Adriana, Kiran, Sofia and Vito could be nominated that week.
- ^6 The producers decided that only Adriana, Gaia, Kiran and Leone could be nominated that week.
- ^7 The producers decided that only Adriana, Amedeo, Kiran and Vito could be nominated that week.
- ^8 The producers decided that only Amedeo, Chiara, Kiran, Martina and Vito could be nominated that week. Ilenia was the favourite housemate of the public and she could save one of the nominees. She saved Martina.
- ^9 The producers decided that only Amedeo, Armando, Caterina, Franco and Vito could be nominated that week. Ilenia was the favoutire housemate of the public and she gave immunity to Rudolf.
- ^10 The next 6 housemates received immunity for a month. Floriana and Rudolf were immune because of the housemates. The public gave immunity to Gaia and Ilenia. The producers gave immunity to Enrica and Fabrizio.
- ^11 Amedeo received 3 extra points as he was given a letter of his girlfriend.
- ^12 Fabrizio could not be nominated as he was ill.
- ^13 As Rudolf left the house and he gained immunity some weeks ago, the male housemates voted to give Rudolf's immunity to another male housemate. They gave immunity to Armando.
- ^14 The next 4 housemates received immunity for three weeks. Armando was immune as he was chosen by his fellow housemates. The public gave immunity to Ilenia and Vito. The producers gave immunity to Floriana.
- ^15 The exempt housemates must save one housemate. The housemates who were saved must save another housemate. Valentina was the only one who was not saved and for this reason, she was nominated.
- ^16 The exempt housemates must nominate four housemates. Randomly, Floriana got the safe card so she could save one of the four nominees, she saved Valentina.
- ^17 The housemates must nominate one housemate between Cristina, Ferdinando and Patrick. The nominated housemate, Ferdinando, joined to the final nominees at the end of the night.
- ^18 Cristina and Patrick were immune as they were not nominated the previous round.
- ^19 On round 19 the male housemates had to save a female housemate the only two with no votes were nominated. Sabrina and Valentina didn't receive any vote and were nominated.
- ^20 Armando and Ilenia were chosen by their fellow housemates to be the only ones who could nominate. Armando nominated two female housemates, Cristina and Sabrina. Ilenia nominated two male housemates, Franco and Patrick.
- ^21 On the first part of round 22, the housemates voted to give a place in the final to another housemate. Ilenia was the most voted and she received to immunity. The producers told her that she could keep her immunity, give to other housemates or open a public vote. Ilenia gave her immunity to Gaia. On the second part of round 23, each housemate saved another housemate until three housemates were not saved.
- ^22 The housemates selected Franco to be the second finalist between him and Sabrina. Then the housemates nominated Sabrina, who was the first nominee with the most votes and she chose Patrick to be the second nominee. Patrick chose Armando to be the third nominee.

== Controversy ==
=== Role of the "Invaders" and management of the edition ===
The critics did not particularly appreciate the Invaders' entry: the authors of Grande Fratello have totally rejected the complaints made by the critics, and by the public, reaffirming the full and total regularity of the program and the televoting.

Margherita Zanatta (GF11) revealed that she had been contacted before the start of the season by Endemol Italia to participate, as an "Invader" in the twelfth edition, but she refused the proposal: a few weeks before, also Guendalina Tavassi (GF11) had also declared that she had received the same proposal, but she then refused to be able to participate in the ninth season of L'isola dei famosi. From the statements just mentioned by Zanatta and Tavassi, it can be deduced that the Invaders' entry had already been premeditated before the start of the twelfth season of Grande Fratello and not after, as the authors had publicly declared of the program at the time of the Invaders' entry.

On 4 July 2012, Patrick Ray Pugliese, one of the Invaders, gave some interviews in which he made controversial statements about the relationships between the authors, the housemates (including himself as the Invader) and the regulation of Grande Fratello. The controversial statements have aroused various controversies as part of the critics read in them an alleged piloting of the game by the authors of the program through a presumed piloting of the Invaders.

=== Alleged influence of call centers on televoting ===
Alfonso Signorini, opinionist of the twelfth edition, in an interview he stated, a few days after the Grade Fratello 12 final, the following: "I believe that within Grande Fratello 12 there was the influence of a few call centers too many: otherwise it is not possible to explain how it is possible that Ilenia, with a fan club of 80,000 people who have not voted all but almost, may have lost to a certain Martina who has 10,000 fans. Maths is not an opinion […] It would be time and time to get organized to ensure that call centers do not interfere with the outcome of a final vote."

Furthermore, Signorini, also in that interview, declared that he had doubts about the fact that Sabrina Mbarek, winner of the twelfth season, did not deserve, in his opinion, this title as Gaia Elide Bruschini, the runner-up, was greeted with a roar from the studio audience while the italian-tunisian coolly. Therefore, the so strong difference in preference between the two competitors, between the studio audience and the one at home, cannot be explained.
