= Micheál Richardson =

Irish actor

Micheál Neeson
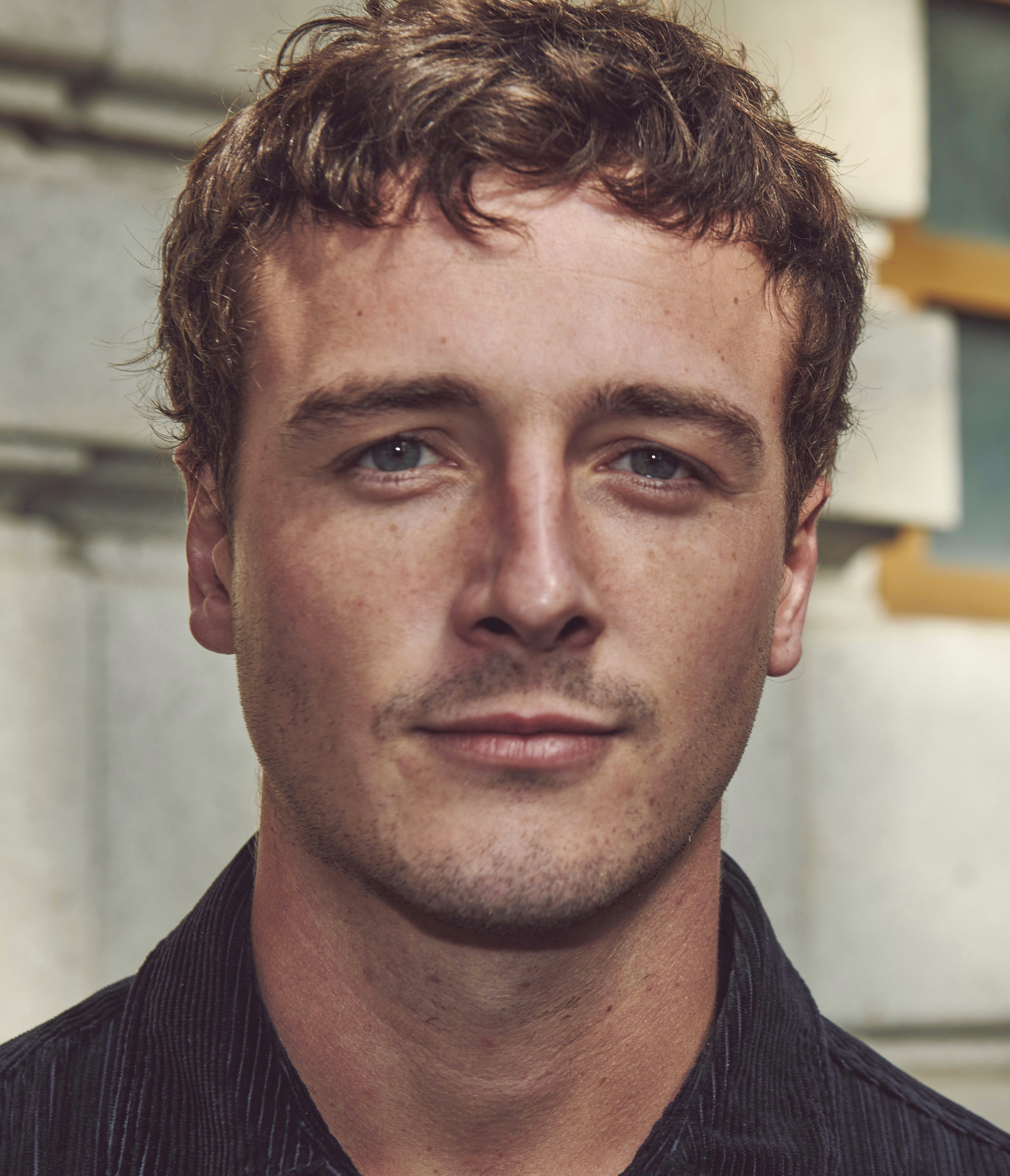
- Richardson in 2026
- Born: Micheál Richard Antonio Neeson; 22 June 1995 (age 31); Dublin, Ireland
- Occupation: Actor
- Years active: 2013–present
- Parents: Liam Neeson (father); Natasha Richardson (mother)
- Family: Redgrave

Micheál Richard Antonio Neeson Richardson (né Neeson; born 22 June 1995) is an Irish actor.

== Early life ==
Neeson was born in Dublin, Ireland, to the Irish actor Liam Neeson and English actress Natasha Richardson, in 1995. He comes from the Redgrave family; a long line of actors on his mother's side, being the grandson of actress Vanessa Redgrave and filmmaker Tony Richardson. He is the great-grandson of Michael Redgrave and Rachel Kempson, nephew of Joely Richardson, grandnephew of actress Lynn Redgrave and actor Corin Redgrave, and first cousin once removed of Jemma Redgrave.

== Career ==
After appearing in Brady Corbet's 2018 film Vox Lux, Richardson played his father's character's son in Cold Pursuit (2019), a remake of the 2014 Norwegian crime thriller In Order of Disappearance.

Neeson appeared alongside his father again in Made in Italy (2020), a film about grief and familial relationships. Both were touched by the script by James D’Arcy and the parallels with their own experiences with grief.

In 2021, Neeson played the lead role in the Sophie Lane Curtis film On Our Way and was attached to The Rising: 1916, a film about the Easter Rising being developed by co-writers Kevin McCann and Colin Broderick.

In 2022, Neeson was cast in a voice-over role for Star Wars: Tales of the Jedi as the young Qui-Gon Jinn, the role his father Liam originally played in Episode I – The Phantom Menace.

== Personal life ==
Neeson took his mother's surname in 2018, nine years after her accidental death, in order to honour her and her side of the family.

== Filmography ==
=== Film ===
Year	Title	Role	Notes	Ref.
2013	Anchorman 2: The Legend Continues	History Channel Reporter	Film debut as Micheál Neeson	
2018	Vox Lux	The Musician		
2019	Cold Pursuit	Kyle Coxman		
2020	Made in Italy	Jack Foster		
2021	On Our Way	Henry Richardson		
2023	Somewhere Quiet	Joe		
TBA	After	Doug	Post-production	

=== Shorts ===
Year	Title	Role	Notes	Ref.
2019	Broken Symphony	Narrator		
2020	Paradise	Rex		
2020	Entree Des Artists	Henry Richardson		
2024	F*ck That Guy			

=== Television ===
Year	Title	Role	Notes	Ref.
2020	Big Dogs	Renny	8 episodes	
2022	Star Wars: Tales of the Jedi	Qui-Gon Jinn (young)	Episode: "Justice"; Voice	
2024	FBI	Freddy Albrecht	Episode: "Pledges"	
