= Carlotta Maggiorana =

Italian actress

- Date: January 3, 1992
- Presenters: Francesco Facchinetti; Diletta Leotta
- Venue: Milan
- Broadcaster: La7, La7d
- Winner: Carlotta Maggiorana; Marche

Carlotta Maggiorana (3 January 1992) is an Italian television and movie actress, she is also the beauty pageant titleholder of the Miss Italia 2018. She won the crown on 17 September 2018.

She is the first married-miss in the Miss Italia story.

== Filmography ==
=== Film ===
- The Tree of Life, directed by Terrence Malick (2011)
- I soliti idioti: Il film, directed by Enrico Lando (2011)
- I 2 soliti idioti, directed by Enrico Lando (2012)
- Un fantastico via vai, directed by Leonardo Pieraccioni (2013)

=== Television ===
- S.P.A. – sitcom (2012)
- L'onore e il rispetto - Ultimo capitolo – series TV (2017)
