= Cristina Del Basso =

Italian model, showgirl and actress

- Born: Cristina Del Basso; 3 May 1987 (age 39); Varese, Italy
- Occupations: Model, showgirl, actress
- Years active: 2008–2017
- Children: 1

Cristina Del Basso (born 3 May 1987) is an Italian model, showgirl and actress.

== Career ==
=== Television ===
==== Reality show ====
- 2008, Canale 5 - Veline
- 2008, Canale 5 - Uomini e donne
- 2009, Canale 5 - Grande Fratello 9
- 2010, Canale 5 - Ciao Darwin 6
- 2012, Canale 5 - Grande Fratello 12

==== Programs ====
- Colorado Cafè (Italia 1, 2009)
- Fiesta (MTV, 2009)
- Salsa Rosa (Comedy Central, 2010)
- Domenica Cinque (Canale 5, 2009–2010)
- Pomeriggio Cinque (Canale 5, 2009–2010)
- Mattino Cinque (Canale 5, 2009–2011)
- Poker1mania (Italia 1, 2009–2012)
- La vita in diretta (Rai 1, 2010)
- A gentile richiesta (Canale 5, 2010)

=== Filmography ===
==== Cinema ====
- A Natale mi sposo, directed by Paolo Costella (2010)
- I soliti idioti: Il film, directed by Enrico Lando (2011)
- I 2 soliti idioti, directed by Enrico Lando (2012)
- La mia mamma suona il rock, directed by Massimo Ceccherini (2013)
- Una vita da sogno, directed by Domenico Costanzo (2013)

==== Fiction ====
- Un medico in famiglia 7 - TV series (Rai 1, 2011)
- Così fan tutte 2 - TV series (Italia 1, 2011–2012)
- SMS - Squadra molto speciale - TV series (Italia 1, 2010–2013)

=== Other activities ===
==== Nude calendars ====
- 2010 - Panorama
- 2012 - Playboy Italia

==== Radio ====
- 2012, Radio 105 - Radio 105 special testimonial for Playboy Italia (visible on RTL 102.5)

==== Videoclip ====
- 2013, band Stil Novo - song Non dirmi mai di no
