= Ghenea =

Ghenea is a Romanian surname. Notable people with the surname include:

- Mădălina Diana Ghenea (born 1987), Romanian actress and model
- Serban Ghenea (born 1969 or 1970), Canadian-Romanian audio engineer and mixer
