= Pazze di me =

- Directed by: Fausto Brizzi
- Written by: Fausto Brizzi; Marco Martani; Federica Bosco
- Produced by: Mario Gianani; Lorenzo Mieli; Fausto Brizzi
- Starring: Francesco Mandelli; Loretta Goggi; Chiara Francini; Claudia Zanella; Marina Rocco; Valeria Bilello; Lucia Poli; Paola Minaccioni
- Cinematography: Marcello Montarsi
- Music by: Bruno Zambrini
- Distributed by: 01 Distribution
- Release date: 23 January 2013
- Running time: 90 minutes
- Country: Italy
- Language: Italian

Pazze di me ('Crazy About Me') is a 2013 Italian comedy film co-written and directed by Fausto Brizzi.

== Plot ==
The film starts with a flashback of protagonist Andrea's childhood, narrated by adult Andrea musing about his dislike for two particular proverbs. According to the first, there is always a first time, but for Andrea the last times are even more important—such as the last time he saw his father, who left the family in the middle of the night many years ago. According to the other proverb, there are seven women for every man in the world—Andrea has them all at home, and none of them is easy to deal with: his grandmother Matilde, once a professor of astrophysics, is now suffering from dementia and depends on her live-in caregiver Bogdana. His mother Vittoria, administrator of 11 condominiums, is the undisputed master of the house, nicknamed Sergeant Hartman (after the Full Metal Jacket character) for her rigorous ways. Then there are his three older sisters: Veronica, the oldest (and the only one to no longer live with her mother), is a convinced feminist with a low opinion of men. Federica, a doctor, is notoriously disorganized. She changes men every other week and habitually makes poor choices in doing so. Beatrice, who became a notary at age 22 (at the same time winning four consecutive wet T-shirt contests), is a perfectionist with a tendency to alienate people through her arrogance.

Andrea grew up being second fiddle to his older sisters. Looking for permanent employment, he is supporting himself with occasional jobs. While working in a bar, he has met Roberta. However, six months into their relationship, as she is spending the night at Andrea's place, tensions arise: Grandma walks in on the couple at night, Vittoria makes the two cancel a planned trip to the beach so Andrea can run some errands for her, Beatrice criticizes Roberta's cooking, Bogdana destroys Roberta’s computer with her thesis on it, Veronica scratches her car and has it towed for being parked in front of the family's garage, and Federica exchanges her dog for another by mistake. Roberta breaks up with Andrea and storms out in anger. She leaves behind the dog, a female, which becomes the seventh “woman” in Andrea's life.

Beatrice’s fiancé leaves her at the altar, as he can no longer bear a woman as flawless as her, which destroys Andrea's hope of another sister moving out. Beatrice falls into a deep depression and refuses to change out of her wedding dress for weeks.

While delivering pizza to the house of a woman named Giulia and her boyfriend Paolo, he walks in on a heated argument between the couple. Giulia ends up leaving Paolo for Andrea, but to avoid losing yet another girlfriend over his difficult family, Andrea claims to be an orphan. After several near-encounters with his family, he is eventually unmasked. Giulia forgives him and is introduced to his family. As Giulia and Andrea spend time at a spa, they discover that Veronica has started an affair with a married man no other than Giulia's father. Nonetheless, Giulia's parents celebrate their wedding anniversary, to which they invite Andrea's entire family. After Andrea's sisters ruin the party, Giulia demands that Andrea decide between her and her family. Andrea declares to his family that he is leaving, packs his bags and heads for Giulia's home. But after an unexpected encounter with his father, who does not even recognize his own son, he decides to “fix” his family before leaving for good. He encourages Federica's assistant (and potential father of the child she is expecting) to make a move towards her, and does the same to the concierge of the condominium, who has long held feelings for Vittoria but never had the courage to express them. He provokes an argument between Veronica and Riccardo, causing the two to break up and making Veronica realize Riccardo was never interested in a serious relationship with her. By showing Beatrice some childhood movies, he makes her realize how she has alienated other people from childhood on. After a harmonic family Christmas, he returns for Giulia, only to find that Paolo has since moved back in with her. He goes on to live on his own, and one day bumps into Roberta in a supermarket. The two decide to give it another try. Just then Andrea gets another call from his mother, but he puts the phone into a crate of lemons and walks off with Roberta.

As the end credits roll, Andrea's phone receives several text messages from his family, announcing new disasters: Matilde hit a cop with her mobility scooter and escaped, Federica has forgotten her baby at the supermarket (right after the message arrives, a loudspeaker announcement about an abandoned baby is heard in the background), Beatrice announces suicide after discovering a white hair, Veronica has fallen in love with Roberta's father, Andrea's father has returned to the family.

== Cast ==
- Francesco Mandelli as Andrea Morelli
- Loretta Goggi as Vittoria Morelli
- Chiara Francini as Beatrice Luisa Elisabetta Morelli
- Claudia Zanella as Veronica Morelli
- Marina Rocco as Federica Morelli
- Valeria Bilello as Giulia
- Lucia Poli as Grandma Matilde Morelli
- Paola Minaccioni as Bogdana
- Margherita Vicario as Roberta
- Fabrizio Biggio as Luca
- Luca Argentero as Corrado
- Gioele Dix as Riccardo
- Alessandro Tiberi as Maurizio
- Pif as Ludovico
- Maurizio Micheli as Marcello
- Flavio Insinna as Andrea's Father
- Edi Angelillo as Maria Paola

== See also ==
- List of Italian films of 2013
