= I soliti idioti =

- Genre: Sitcom
- Starring: Francesco Mandelli; Fabrizio Biggio
- Country of origin: Italy
- Original language: Italian
- No. of seasons: 4
- No. of episodes: 38

Original release
- Network: MTV Italy
- Release: 2009 – 2012

I soliti idioti ("The Usual Idiots") is an Italian television series starring Francesco Mandelli and Fabrizio Biggio. The series won Best MTV Show at the 2011 TRL Awards.

== Characters ==
Each episode features unique scenes, in which the two main characters (played by Mandelli and Biggio) appear, supported by the appearance of extras who are sometimes inherent in the story but who almost never interact directly with the main characters:

- Il nichilista (the nihilist): (played by Mandelli) a character inspired by a concept of absolute nihilism. He spends his time in a bar reading a newspaper and inserting himself into the discourses of people sitting next to him, offering his point of view.
- Gli Sbroccati (the crackpots): two different people, but they have in common the meeting of trivial incidents in various situations, and their over-apologizing to each other whenever they get into heated disagreements.
- I tifosi (supporters): Two mature and sensible friends, while attending a football match, discuss topics of social significance through deep speeches, which are interspersed with sudden outbursts of cheers, chants, insults and scurrilous gestures when their team or the opposing team scores a goal.
- Father & Son: a father (Ruggero De Ceglie) and his son (Gianluca), wealthy members of the Roman elite living in a large apartment. In the third episode of the third season, Gianluca says he has never been to Rome and his father Ruggero says that they live in Milan. Ruggero is authoritarian, dishonest and vulgar, while his son is a very naive graduate, a lover of art, nature and technology. His father is very hard on him and frequently leads him to daring and immoral actions, putting him always in trouble. Other related secondary characters that are often mentioned, but seldom appear, are:
  - Ruggero's wife and mother of Gianluca, who is almost always in Jamaica or Australia
  - Fabiana, the ugly girlfriend of Gianluca
  - Chicco, Poniuma, Lello, Ugo, Edoardo and Sergio 'er puzza' ('the stink'), friends of Ruggero
  - Romoletto, the other son of Ruggero and brother of Gianluca
  - The son of Edoardo, mentioned several times by Ruggero, who urges his son to be more like him
  - Marika, a porn star and Ruggero's friend (The Italian film released in theaters in 2011, "I soliti idioti – The Movie," is based on this sketch.)
- L'amante del primario (the mistress of the primary): an anesthesiologist for two doctors working in a hospital operating room. She is a busty and beautiful woman and uses her charm to have secret relations with the primary Donghi.
- Il precario (the precarious): an office employee (Mandelli) constantly harassed by work practices, oppressed and ridiculed by his boss (Biggio), often represented as a devil. He tries and fails to convince others to join him and rebel.
- Dolce attesa (sweet wait): a gay couple trying to have a child, resulting in ridiculous situations, such as asking the pharmacist to verify the pregnancy test, participation in courses for pregnant mothers and visits to the gynecologist. Both characters are called Fabio. The scenes follow the same pattern: the 'father' (Mandelli), has eyes only for his phone, not considering other people, the other (Biggio) is the 'pregnant'. She tries to ask him questions, and he replies with annoyance "I don't know, I don't know ..." Then she tries to socialize other people, but when they look astonished, she accuses them to have trouble seeing homosexuals, and repeats loudly the word "homosexual". In Episode 6 of the third season, Fabio 'the father' claims to be heterosexual.
- Il rinnovamento della Chiesa (the renewal of the church): two priests, Father Boy (Biggio) and Father Giorgio (Mandelli), work at the Vatican to show Catholic senior echelons, including the Pope, the most extravagant ways to increase the consensus of the mass towards the Catholic Church.
- Gisella e Sebastiano (Dicaaa, un attimo e sono subito da lei): The same woman (Gisella, played by Biggio) works as a clerk in several public offices, including a post office, a bank, an information center, a police station, a call center, a lost & found office, even as a waitress in a restaurant. The customer (Sebastiano, played by Mandelli) is deceived by the woman in the most improbable ways, sometimes partially stripped before his indifference. Sebastiano is forced to repeat his requests several times, as Gisella constantly repeats, "Dicaaa ..." (in English, "please tell"), and then answering, "Just a moment and I'm right with you". Then she continues to rotate on the chair, to say and do the same things, then calls his colleague Bertelli, never finishing anything. Despite having a weak and submissive personality, Sebastiano has a stereotypical metalhead appearance, always wearing an Iron Maiden T-shirt partially covered by a dark sweatshirt, with a long, thin beard, a dark ski mask covering his head under a white motorcycle helmet. In the third season, Sebastiano finally rebels, attacking the woman after she throws into a furnace a suitcase full of money to be deposited in the bank.
- (Im)moralisti ((Im)moralists): A wealthy couple, Marialuce e Giampietro, while walking or jogging, comes across people belonging to various social categories such as, for example, a homeless man, a lesbian couple, a man in a wheelchair, etc.. Marialuce in front of them stalls herself embarrassed because she doesn't know what is the most appropriate behavior. In fact, she always gets scared to see people who she thinks is abnormal. Giampietro is also forced by her to stall himself, even though he continues to repeat "It's normal, Marialuce, it's normal ...". Despite they try to be politically correct and polite, situations often result in the antics totally opposite to their intentions.
- The blind friend: two friends, one blind but very nice and very clumsy, and the other a hypocrite. The hypocrite, in attempting to assist the blind friend and take her out, ends up putting her in embarrassing situations or making her the subject of indelicate jokes, apparently oblivious to his handicap.
- Mamma esco... ("Mom, I go out..."): A little boy (Niccolò) leaves home saying he's going to do things that are always illegal or extravagant, inappropriate for anyone, or at least for a boy of his age, often with his friend Gigetto. The mother and father never appear on the screen and communicate with the child, screaming from different parts of the house. Even though Niccolò says he's going to do activities like taking drugs, stealing and killing, the parents seem not to care and answer saying things like "did you tell daddy?" or "don't be late". From the third season, the sketch is extending to show two children in school, struggling with various issues and tasks.
- Quindi quindi... (so so...): In a gym, a taxi driver (Rocco Tanica) tells his adventures to two guys, describing his conquests. The two guys repeat the words "so so" to get him to the only part of the story that really interests them: when he takes them to bed. They remain eternally disappointed because the playboy's stories always end in a stalemate.
- La ministra (the minister): the anesthesiologist "the mistress of the primary" is elected minister, his former assistants are the doctors and his speeches are full of double entendres. He does not understand the questions of journalists and interprets everything as if it were related to sex.
- Si ma... lo scontrino? ("Yes but... the receipt?"): a shopkeeper in a stationery store, elderly and with a disabled arm that looks like a dead weight. A customer dressed hippie style after each purchase always pays 2.50 euros and suspiciously asks him for the receipt. The retailer uses tricks and tries to say anything to distract the customer to make him forget and hoping not to make him the ticket, but the customer repeatedly asks him: "Yes but... the receipt?"
- I poliziotti scoreggioni (the farted police): Two policemen on patrol in public places give up farting, believing that their farts are sounds of gunfire and blame and punish innocent citizens as if they are criminals.
- I morti di sonno (the deaths of sleep): A couple of teenagers in the company of friends find themselves in a park with their scooters. Constantly in the throes of sleep, they turn to each other and with other people, with a language of only yawns, that means almost the same words (minchia, cazzo...).
- Karaoke di fine puntata (karaoke at the episode end): Episodes conclude all with a karaoke scene where two different characters in every episode play the same song in different ways.
- Jackson and Johnson: (always appear at the end of the episodes of Season Two) a couple of entrepreneurs (each time a different branch of the service sector) who dress like Charlie Chaplin and speak with a British accent. Each time, the family is complaining of their defective products, and each time there are two of them to solve their problem in their own way (for example, breaking all the phones because they complained that the bill is too high, or killing the grandmother to solve the insurance problem). The episode is closed with them singing a song that is reinterpreted by the other characters.
- I putti (the two angels): Two underpaid theater performers, dressed like angels. One of them is starving to leave the food to children and his pregnant wife, while the other tries to convince him to go on strike.
- Il Mafioso (the mafious): Totò Gruppusu (Mandelli) is a man who tries to "detoxify" from the Mafia, but it seems that he will never be able to because of his illness, and he says that his wife Carmela (Giulia Michelini) forces him to stop being a mobster. He often repeats the phrase "Chi minchia guaddi?" ("What the fuck you look?")
- Totò Emanuele II and Peppino Garibaldi: From the third set at each end of the second episode is a song sung by Vittorio "Totò" Emanuele II (Francesco Mandelli) and Giuseppe "Peppino" Garibaldi (Fabrizio Biggio), or a scene showing these characters in silent film style.
- Severino and Goffredo: Severino, probably a young man with mental retardation, is driven by his older brother Goffredo to arrange some matters (such as buying vegetables or to open an account) to learn to get by independently without the help of anyone else, but he is cheated and scolded from his "big brother".
- Patrick & Alexio: Two boys in Milan who address issues with their adolescent commenting, with a limited vocabulary made up of just four words (figa, minchia, cazzo, culo).
- Gli ScandicCinesi (the ScandicChinese): A "Tlattolia Toscana" (a Tuscan Taveln) is run by two Chinese men who pretend to be promoters of Tuscan cooking, talking with a strong Florentine accent (although replacing the letter "r" with "l"). This infuriates all of their customers (including famous people like Rocco Siffredi, Mădălina Ghenea, Francesco Renga and Teo Teocoli), and they give the customers, instead of the Tuscan dish they requested, typical Chinese restaurant food (like Cantonese rice and spring rolls). They finally conclude their disputes with a song with a Chinese passage and melody.
- L'amministratore Nazista (the Nazi administrator): A building manager (Mandelli), similar in appearance to Adolf Hitler, who plays the role as if the building was a Nazi concentration camp, in particular tormenting the family of one of the condominiums (Biggio), calling him "little Pinocchio".
- La mano amica (the friend hand): A man (Biggio, probably mentally ill) addresses his right hand, on which he has drawn a mouth and eyes as if it were his partner. In an episode of the fourth season, he meets another man (Mandelli) that does the same thing.
- I litigiosi (the quarrelsome): Two men, around 40 years old (Biggio and Mandelli), are two characters similar to the Crackpots. The first (Biggio) is tall, wears a sleeveless shirt and jeans, with a mustache, short black hair and ugly teeth. The second (Mandelli) is short, with long black hair and goggles, with a strong bass voice. They always meet by mistake or chance, and the first always makes a mistake against the other and tells him he's sorry. The other responds gently and kindly. In one episode, they are on a beach. One man (portrayed by Biggio) slams a towel full of sand over the other. He tell the other "sorry" and talks to him with kindness. The other man responds, "Don't worry, it's all okay, it's nothing." However, after a few seconds, the other replies rudely, "Hey, there is a shovel, so you can bury me faster" or "Don't worry, continue to slam your towel over me, and bury me under the sand". They begin to fight, saying, "Ma cosa dove cosa dove cosa", (in English: "But what where what"). They are screaming and insulting. If someone interrupts them, telling them to stop fighting, they team up and say, "but stop what?" or "but be quiet when?" or "But go away where?"

== First season ==
The first season aired 10 episodes between 28 February and 25 April 2009, on Saturday evening beginning at 22:30.

No.	Italian title	Before MTV TV
1	First episode	28 February 2009
2	Second episode	28 February 2009
3	Third episode	7 March 2009
4	Fourth episode	14 March 2009
5	Fifth episode	21 March 2009
6	Sixth episode	28 March 2009
7	Seventh episode	4 April 2009
8	Eighth episode	11 April 2009
9	Ninth episode	18 April 2009
10	Tenth episode	25 April 2009

== Second season ==
The first episode of the second season was broadcast on MTV Italy on 18 February 2010. The first three scenes were shown Wednesday 8 July 2009, at 17.30 during broadcast of the film Adrian as part of the Roma Fiction Fest in the sitcom category. The second season featured appearances by famous faces from the show, including singers Paola e Chiara and Rocco Tanica.

No.	Italian title	Before MTV TV
1	First episode	18 February 2010
2	Second episode	18 February 2010
3	Third episode	25 February 2010
4	Fourth episode	4 March 2010
5	Fifth episode	11 March 2010
6	Sixth episode	18 March 2010
7	Seventh episode	25 March 2010
8	Eighth episode	25 March 2010
9	Ninth episode	2 April 2010
10	Tenth episode	2 April 2010
11	Eleventh episode	9 April 2010
12	Twelfth episode	9 April 2010
13	Thirteenth episode	18 April 2010
14	Fourteenth episode	18 April 2010

== Third season ==
The first episode of the third season was broadcast on MTV Italy on 16 February 2011. Guest stars this season included Gianmarco Tognazzi, Rocco Tanica and Giulia Michelini.

No.	Italian title	Before MTV TV
1	First episode	16 February 2011
2	Second episode	16 February 2011
3	Third episode	23 February 2011
4	Fourth episode	23 February 2011
5	Fifth episode	2 March 2011
6	Sixth episode	2 March 2011
7	Seventh episode	10 March 2011
8	Eighth episode	10 March 2011
9	Ninth episode	17 March 2011
10	Tenth episode	17 March 2011
11	Eleventh episode	24 March 2011
12	Twelfth episode	24 March 2011
13	Thirteenth episode	31 March 2011
14	Fourteenth episode	31 March 2011

== Fourth season ==
The fourth season premiered on MTV Italy on 26 April 2012. This season featured guest stars including Rocco Siffredi, Teo Teocoli, Mădălina Ghenea and Francesco Renga

No.	Italian title	Before MTV TV
1	First episode	26 April 2012
2	Second episode	26 April 2012
3	Third episode	3 May 2012
4	Fourth episode	3 May 2012
5	Fifth episode	10 May 2012
6	Sixth episode	10 May 2012
7	Seventh episode	17 May 2012
8	Eighth episode	17 May 2012

== DVD ==
The series beginning from the 2011 season was released on DVD. The Idiots The Movie was released on DVD on 22 February 2012.

== Films ==
I soliti idioti: Il film, direcred by Enrico Lando, was released on 4 November 2011. A sequel entitled I 2 soliti idioti was released on 20 December 2012.

== San Remo 2012 controversy ==
In February 2012, Biggio and Mandelli participated in a gala performance at the 62nd San Remo Festival. During the presentation, playing a gay couple (recurring characters from their show), they simulated a same-sex marriage officiated by Gianni Morandi. Afterwards, they sang a song, broadcast on MTV, that included lyrics that roughly translate to:

Homosexual, even my grandmother understands, is just like being a woman, without a menstrual cycle. When I go to the hospital I always cause a big scene, I want to have a son, but he should be homosexual, a little strange and a little normal.

The reaction the following day from LGBT associations and from the LGBT community was harsh, and the incident received comments on LGBT-themed blogs and websites, and made headlines in all the major Italian newspapers.

- The Gay Center through the ANSA news service: "In San Remo, homophobia takes the stage. Mandelli and Biggio have offended the gay community."
- Arcigay: "Satire is about opinions, not about personal characteristics, not about sexual orientation, not about minorities. To define gay men as women who don't menstruate is shameful, especially using the usual flaming stereotypes. A state television establishment that reduces gays to caricatures undermines decades of battles; it destroys in five minutes our sense of deep struggle."
- The Italian association of Gay Parents (Agedo): "Is it really so amusing to offend millions of gay people with such vulgarity? Satire is not about opinions, or the orientation of people or their innate identities. What would have been the reaction if these offensive remarks had been made about people of colour, women, Jews or the disabled?"
- Ivan Scalfarotto, vice president of the Italian Democratic Party: "The things that we saw and heard are not acceptable in any civilized country. To say that gays are like women without their periods offends not only gays, but women, men, life. I Soliti Idioti speaks to children at a time when homophobic bullying is a plague that causes teenagers who can't take the pressure to take their own lives"
- Franco Grillini, in an interview in Corriere della Sera: "Nothing original here. The Usual Idiots have done their usual idiocy. That Morandi stated immediately after that he has nothing against gays should make us breathe a sigh of relief —- thank you, very good, what great effort, such openness, such progressiveness!"

== See also ==
- List of Italian television series
