= The Mongrel =

- Film poster
- Italian: Roazza bastarda
- Directed by: Alessandro Gassmann
- Written by: Federico Schlatter
- Story by: Alessandro Gassmann; Vittorio Moroni
- Starring: Alessandro Gassmann; Giovanni Anzaldo; Manrico Gammarota; Sergio Meogrossi; Matteo Taranto; Mădălina Diana Ghenea; Michele Placido
- Cinematography: Fabrizio Lucci
- Music by: Pivio and Aldo De Scalzi
- Release date: November 17, 2012 (Rome Film Festival)

The Mongrel (Italian: Razza bastarda) is a 2012 Italian thriller-drama film. It marked the directorial debut of actor Alessandro Gassmann, who also co-wrote the script and starred in the film.

For his performance Gassmann won the Globo d'oro for best actor. The film was nominated for two David di Donatello, for best new director and for best original song ("La vita possibile"), and also received three nominations at Nastri d'Argento Awards, for best cinematography, best new director and best score.

== Cast ==
- Alessandro Gassmann as Roman
- Giovanni Anzaldo as Nicu
- Manrico Gammarota as Geco
- Sergio Meogrossi as Talebano
- Matteo Taranto as Dragos
- Mădălina Diana Ghenea as Dorina
- Michele Placido as Avv. Silvestri
- Maiga Bailkissa as Lourdes
- Carolina Facchinetti as Chiara
- Nadia Rinaldi as Maddalena

== See also ==
- List of Italian films of 2012
