= Made in Italy (2020 film) =

2020 comedy film

- Theatrical release poster
- Directed by: James D'Arcy
- Written by: James D'Arcy
- Produced by: Pippa Cross; Sam Tipper-Hale
- Starring: Liam Neeson; Micheál Richardson; Valeria Bilello; Lindsay Duncan
- Cinematography: Mike Eley
- Edited by: Mark Day; Anthony Boys
- Music by: Alex Belcher
- Production companies: HanWay Films; Ingenious Media; CrossDay Productions; Indiana Production
- Distributed by: Lionsgate
- Release date: 7 August 2020 (United States)
- Running time: 93 minutes
- Countries: Italy; United Kingdom
- Language: English
- Box office: $2.9 million

Made in Italy is a 2020 comedy-drama film written and directed by James D'Arcy (in his feature directorial debut). It stars Liam Neeson, his son, Micheál Richardson, Valeria Bilello, and Lindsay Duncan.

The plot follows the once famous artist Robert Foster, who must restore a villa for and with his estranged son Jack years after his wife dies in a car crash.

The film was released in the United States in theatres and through video on demand platforms on 7 August 2020 by IFC Films.

== Plot ==
Jack Foster is devastated, as not only does his wife Ruth want a divorce, but her family is selling the art gallery he has managed for years. Hoping to buy it, he decides to sell the Italian home he owns with famous artist Robert, his estranged father. The house once belonged to Jack's mother and Robert's wife, an Italian woman who died in a car crash years ago.

Taking Robert with him to Italy, Jack explains he needs the proceeds from the house sale to buy the gallery from Ruth's parents. They find the house completely run down. After surveying it, estate agent Kate confirms it looks terrible. However, they could increase its value by putting in some work. Jack tries to clean but then decides to sell the house as is.

Jack meets Natalia at her restaurant. When Robert looks at photos of his deceased wife, the whole house reminds him of her. He decides to help Jack renovate. Robert and Jack befriend some locals, including Natalia, inviting them to a house party. She tells Jack that she has an eight-year-old daughter and is divorced. Natalia only has partial custody, as her ex lied about her.

After Kate shows a disapproving client the house, she insists it needs some work. So, Robert asks Natalia to help. As she and her daughter help paint, he recounts he sent Jack to boarding school to shield him from all the reminders of his mother since her death. Robert has not been able to drive or paint ever since.

Kate sees the house almost fully done; a couple arrives to see it and decide they want it. Meanwhile, Jack tells Natalia about his impending divorce and how Ruth has taken everything from him, which she empathises with. Although he cannot paint like his father, he is a good gallery manager, but Robert has never supported him.

Later, Jack enters his father's workspace and sees painting after painting of his mother, and of himself. When Robert finds him, he asks why he locked away all his memories and childhood. He answers he was protecting him from the pain. Jack screams at him for not letting him in, nor talking to him, then begins wrecking the space. Robert holds him as they collapse onto the floor.

Later, they talk about her for the first time, sharing memories. Robert begins crying, recounting what happened the day she died. So wrapped up in painting, the young Jack had walked to school alone. He blames himself for her accident as he kept on painting. Jack hugs and comforts him, telling him about his divorce from Ruth. Robert is relieved to hear this news, as he was expecting it to happen.

The next day the couple who want the house disrespect it, so Robert refuses to sell it to them, angering Jack. Robert admits he cannot give up the house. His accuses him of never having any intention to sell, and returns to England.

Robert visits Jack, telling him he sold his London home so can buy Jack out of his share of the Tuscany villa. He urges him to buy the gallery back. When Jack asks Robert why he never came, he says Ruth told him Jack did not want him to, as it was too much pressure. Robert plans to live at the Italian home and host painting holidays. Jack goes to the gallery, and when Ruth says she no longer wants to sell the gallery, he instead hands her the signed divorce papers.

In Italy, Robert leads a painting class where Kate is a student. Jack arrives telling Robert it was never about the money, and all he wants is his father. He then meets with Natalia, who wants to know why he did not say goodbye. Jack reveals he saw her with Marzio, and she reminds him that, being the father of her child they must maintain some relationship. So, Natalie and he decide to start over. The film ends with father and son painting a wall together.

== Cast ==
- Liam Neeson as Robert Foster
- Micheál Richardson as Jack Foster
- Valeria Bilello as Natalia
- Lindsay Duncan as Kate
- Marco Quaglia as Luigi
- Gian Marco Tavani as Marzio
- Helena Antonio as Raffaella
- Yolanda Kettle as Ruth
- Julian Ovenden as Gordon
- Chelsea Fitzgerald as Amy
- Flaminia Cinque as Deli Owner

== Production ==
In October 2018, it was announced Liam Neeson and Micheál Richardson had joined the cast of the film, with James D'Arcy directing from a screenplay he wrote. Pippa Cross, Sam Tipper-Hale, and Nicola Serra will serve as producers on the film under their CrossDay Productions and Indiana Productions banners, respectively. HanWay Films and Ingenious Media will also produce the film. In May 2019, Lindsay Duncan and Valeria Bilello joined the cast of the film.

Principal photography began in April 2019.

The house in the film was Villa Fontanelle, a private villa near Montalcino, Italy. Parts of the interior were "deconstructed" (made to appear old and shabby). Some other scenes were filmed in the village of Monticchiello; the scenes in a restaurant were filmed there, at Ristorante Il Bronzino. The filming in Italy was completed on 19 June 2019.

== Release ==
In February 2020, IFC Films acquired US distribution rights to the film. It was released on video on demand as well as in limited theaters in the United States on 7 August 2020.

== Reception ==
=== Box office and VOD ===
In its debut weekend, Made in Italy grossed $34,400 from 111 theatres, and was also the second-most rented film on Apple TV and the iTunes Store. In its second weekend the film finished third on Apple TV's chart and fourth on Spectrum's.

=== Critical response ===
On Rotten Tomatoes the film holds an approval rating of 44% based on 81 reviews, with an average rating of 5.4/10. The website's critics consensus reads, "Strong performances and a lovely setting are half the battle for Made in Italy -- unfortunately, the other half is lost by a disappointingly slight story." On Metacritic, the film has a weighted average score of 44 out of 100, based on 12 critics, indicating "mixed or average reviews".

Most critics' gripes centered around the story and screenplay; Ryan Lattanzio of IndieWire wrote that the "treacly slog" of the script betrayed the "storied talent" of Neeson and the "promising gifts" of Richardson, and Peter Travers of Rolling Stone referred to it as a "mawkish tale" of grief and healing.
