= I 2 soliti idioti =

2012 film

- Theatrical release poster
- Directed by: Enrico Lando
- Screenplay by: Martino Ferro; Fabrizio Biggio; Francesco Mandelli
- Produced by: Pietro Valsecchi
- Starring: Francesco Mandelli; Fabrizio Biggio
- Cinematography: Massimo Schiavon
- Edited by: Pietro Morana
- Distributed by: Medusa Film
- Release date: 20 December 2012
- Running time: 92 minutes
- Country: Italy
- Language: Italian

I 2 soliti idioti (lit. 'The 2 usual idiots') is a 2012 Italian satirical comedy film directed by Enrico Lando, based on the comedy series of the same name.

It is a sequel to 2011 film I soliti idioti: Il film.

== Cast ==
- Francesco Mandelli as Ruggero De Ceglie / Various
- Fabrizio Biggio as Gianluca De Ceglie / Various
- Miriam Giovanelli as Perla Madonna / Sheron
- Teo Teocoli as Prof. Luigi Pelosi
- Silvia Cohen as Mrs. Pelosi
- Gianmarco Tognazzi as Siro Pileri
- Rosita Celentano as the nurse
- Cristina Del Basso as Erica
- Carlotta Maggiorana as Emma
