= La solita commedia: Inferno =

- Theatrical release poster
- Directed by: Fabrizio Biggio; Francesco Mandelli; Martino Ferro
- Produced by: Lorenzo Mieli; Mario Gianani
- Starring: Fabrizio Biggio; Francesco Mandelli
- Cinematography: Marco Bassano
- Edited by: Valentina Mariani
- Music by: Pasquale Filastò
- Production company: Wildside
- Distributed by: Warner Bros. Pictures
- Release date: 19 March 2015
- Running time: 95 minutes
- Country: Italy
- Language: Italian
- Box office: $804,394

La solita commedia: Inferno is a 2015 Italian comedy film directed by and starring Francesco Mandelli and Fabrizio Biggio and co-directed by Martino Ferro.

== Cast ==
- Francesco Mandelli
- Fabrizio Biggio
- Giordano De Plano
- Tea Falco
- Marco Foschi
- Walter Leonardi
- Paolo Pierobon
- Marco Ripoldi
- Massimiliano Loizzi
- Gianmarco Tognazzi
- Daniela Virgilio
