= Somewhere Quiet =

2023 film by Olivia West Lloyd

- Theatrical release poster
- Directed by: Olivia West Lloyd
- Written by: Olivia West Lloyd
- Produced by: Emma Hannaway; Taylor Shung; Eamon Downey
- Starring: Jennifer Kim; Kentucker Audley; Micheál Neeson; Marin Ireland
- Cinematography: Conor Murphy
- Edited by: Sofi Marshal
- Music by: Ariel Marx
- Production companies: The Population; Last Rodeo Studios
- Distributed by: Vertical
- Release dates: June 8, 2023 (Tribeca); February 2, 2024 (United States)
- Running time: 102 minutes
- Country: United States
- Language: English

Somewhere Quiet is a 2023 American psychological thriller film written and directed by Olivia West Lloyd, in her directorial debut. It stars Jennifer Kim, Kentucker Audley, Micheál Neeson and Marin Ireland.

It had its world premiere at the Tribeca Festival on June 8, 2023.

== Premise ==
Somewhere Quiet is a psychological horror film that explores what happens after the end of a traditional slasher story. The story follows Meg, the survivor of a harrowing kidnapping, as she attempts to readjust to normalcy at her husband's family estate on Cape Cod. After exposure to his family's unusual dynamics and town history, Meg's grip on truth and reality begin to unravel.

== Cast ==
- Jennifer Kim as Meg Rhoads
- Kentucker Audley as Scott Whitman
- Marin Ireland as Madelin Whitman
- Micheál Neeson as Joe

== Production ==
Olivia West Lloyd was inspired to make the film after watching slasher films and wanting to continue to follow the "final girl" characters after the credits. Principal photography took place in 2022 in the Massachusetts cities of Cotuit, Boston, Barnstable and Yarmouth.

== Release ==
Somewhere Quiet had its world premiere at the Tribeca Festival on June 8, 2023. In October 2023, Vertical acquired North American, United Kingdom and Irish distribution rights to the film. The film was released in the United States on February 2, 2024.

== Reception ==
On the review aggregator website Rotten Tomatoes, 93% of 14 critics' reviews are positive, with an average rating of 6.9/10.

Meagan Navarro of Bloody Disgusting wrote: "For those that don't mind wading into the darker recesses of a fractured mind, Somewhere Quiet offers a melancholic, intimate, and moody seaside epilogue of a Final Girl's story.
