= Valeria Bilello =

Italian actress and model

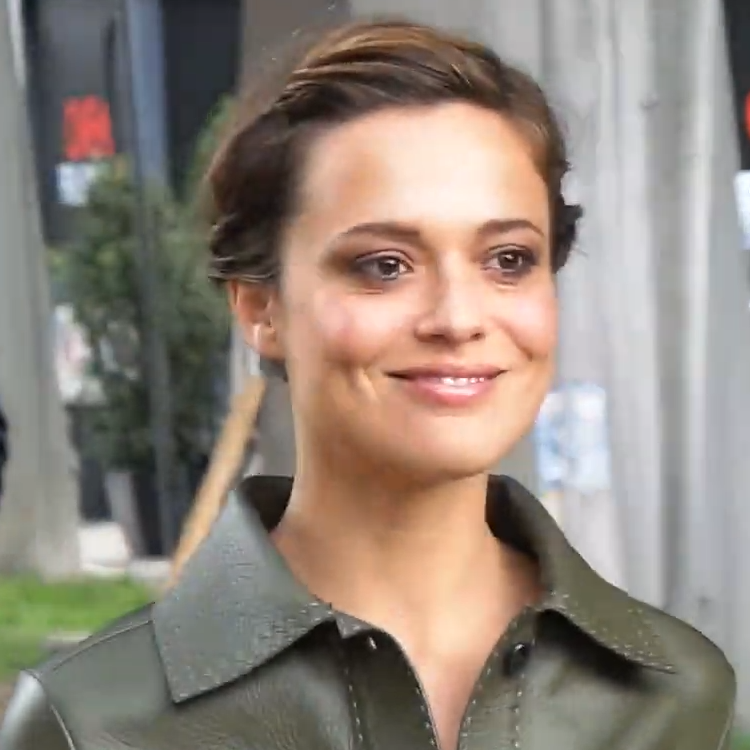
- Born: 2 May 1982 (age 44); Sciacca, Sicily, Italy
- Occupations: Actress; model
- Years active: 1999-present

Valeria Bilello (born 2 May 1982) is an Italian actress and model.

== Biography ==
Valeria Bilello was born in Sciacca, in Sicily, Italy, on 2 May 1982, and grew up in Milan. During her high-school studies in foreign languages, she made her debut in showbiz, starting to model and shooting commercials. After her film studies in Milan in 2006, she shot the short film Attesa, winner at the Festival Sguardi Altrove. In 2008 she started her career as an actress, playing in the movie Giovanna's Father, directed by Pupi Avati and presented at the Venice Film Festival. In 2010, Academy Award winner Gabriele Salvatores chose her for the movie Happy Family, for which she was awarded Best Actress at the Festival International du film de Boulogne-Billancourt. Between 2011 and 2012, she played different roles: in Il giorno in più by Massimo Venier, in I soliti idioti by Enrico Lando, in Ti amo troppo per dirtelo by Marco Ponti and in Come non detto by Ivan Silvestrini. In 2013, she played in Pazze di me by Fausto Brizzi, in Miele by Valeria Golino and she was the only Italian actress in One Chance by David Frankel. In 2014, she will be on the screen in the movie Io, Arlecchino by Giorgio Pasotti.

In 2012, Giorgio Armani wanted her to be the worldwide testimonial of the fragrance Armani Code Luna commercial and print campaign. The campaign led to the creation of a trilogy of short movies (Olga, Alice and Valeria), directed by Olivier Zahm, Can Evgin and Julien Carlier and in collaboration with the magazine Purple.

== Filmography ==
=== Films ===
Year	Title	Role	Notes
2008	Giovanna's Father	Marcella Taxler	
2010	Happy Family	Caterina	
2011	I soliti idioti: Il film	Woman	Cameo appearance
2011	One Day More	Alessia	
2012	Tell No One	Stefania	
2013	Pazze di me	Giulia	
2013	Miele	Irene's mother	
2013	One Chance	Alessandra	
2015	Monitor	Elisa	
2017	Ignorance Is Bliss	Margherita	
2019	Compromessi sposi	Claudia	
2019	Un'avventura	Linda	
2020	Made in Italy	Natalia	
2021	Security	Elena Ventini	
2022	L'ombra del giorno	Amelia	
2022	Il giorno più bello	Serena	
2023	Da grandi	Francesca	

=== Television ===
Year	Title	Role	Notes
2006	Intralci	Alvara/ Various roles	Main role; 20 episodes
2013	Ultimo – L'occhio del falco	Deborah	Miniseries
2013	Il clan dei camorristi	Mara De Simone	Main role; 8 episodes
2014	Ti amo troppo del dirtelo	Claudia	Television film
2014	La strada dritta	Maria	Television film
2015–2017	Squadra mobile	Isabella D'Amato	Main role; 30 episodes
2016	Il sistema	Floriana Ferro	Episode: "Sistema Turckey 2015"
2017–2018	Sense8	Lila Facchini	Recurring role; 7 episodes
2019	Lontano da te	Francesca	Main role; 8 episodes
2019	Liberi tutti	Nicoletta	Main role; 12 episodes
2020	Curon	Anna Raina	Lead role; 6 episodes
2021	Purchè finisca bene	Beatrice	Episode: "Digitare il codice segreto"

=== Music videos ===
Year	Title	Artist(s)	Notes
2006	"Dimmi come passi le notti"	Pier Cortese	
2012	"Come non detto"	Syria feat. Ghemon	
2015	"Melancholia"	Mambassa	

== Non-scripted television shows ==
=== MTV ===
- Web Chart (1999–2000)
- Hitlist Italia
- Dancefloor Chart
- Romalive (2000–2001)
- MTV Select (2002–2004)
- MTV on the beach (2001, 2003–2004)
- Dance Show (2004–2005)

=== All Music ===
- Call Center (2006)
- One Shot Revolution (2006-2009)
- All Music Show (2006)
- Playlist
- Community (2008)
- On Live (2008)

=== Mediaset ===
- Nonsolomoda, Canale 5 (2010-2011)

== Advertisement ==
- Telecom Italia – Telecom Italia Mobile (2003)
- Giorgio Armani – Olga, directed by Olivier Zahm and Can Evgin (2011)
- Giorgio Armani – Alice, directed by Olivier Zahm and Can Evgin (2012)
- Giorgio Armani – Valeria, directed by Olivier Zahm and Julien Carlier (2012)
- Giorgio Armani – Armani Code Luna (2012)

== Videoclip ==
- Pier Cortese – Dimmi come passi le notti, directed by Jacopo Tartarone (2006)
- Mambassa – Melancholia, directed by Lorenzo Vignolo (2015)

== Awards ==
- 2006: Best Directing Award at the Festival Sguardi Altrove for the short film Attesa.
- 2010: Best Actress Award at the Festival International du film de Boulogne-Billancourt for the film Happy Family directed by Gabriele Salvatores.
- 2015: L'Oréal Paris for Cinema Award at Venice Film Festival.
