= I soliti idioti: Il film =

2011 film

- Theatrical release poster
- Directed by: Enrico Lando
- Screenplay by: Martino Ferro; Fabrizio Biggio; Francesco Mandelli
- Produced by: Pietro Valsecchi
- Starring: Francesco Mandelli; Fabrizio Biggio
- Cinematography: Massimo Schiavon
- Edited by: Giovanni Gritti; Pietro Morana
- Distributed by: Medusa Film
- Release date: 4 November 2011
- Running time: 87 minutes
- Country: Italy
- Language: Italian

I soliti idioti: Il film (lit. 'The usual idiots: the movie') is a 2011 Italian satirical comedy film directed by Enrico Lando, based on the comedy series of the same name.

A sequel film entitled I 2 soliti idioti was released on 20 December 2012.

== Cast ==
- Francesco Mandelli as Ruggero De Ceglie / Various
- Fabrizio Biggio as Gianluca De Ceglie / Various
- Francesco Sarcina as Fregone
- Mădălina Diana Ghenea as Messalina / Irina Tjianchikova
- Miriam Leone as TV reporter
- Valeria Bilello as brothel girl
- Marco Foschi as Remo
- Gianmarco Tognazzi as De Peverelli
- Elisabetta De Palo as Marika
- Cristina Del Basso as Enrica
- Rocco Tanica as Luigi
- Carlotta Maggiorana as Emma
- Verdena as Sebastiano's friends
