= Claudia Letizia =

Italian actress, dancer and singer

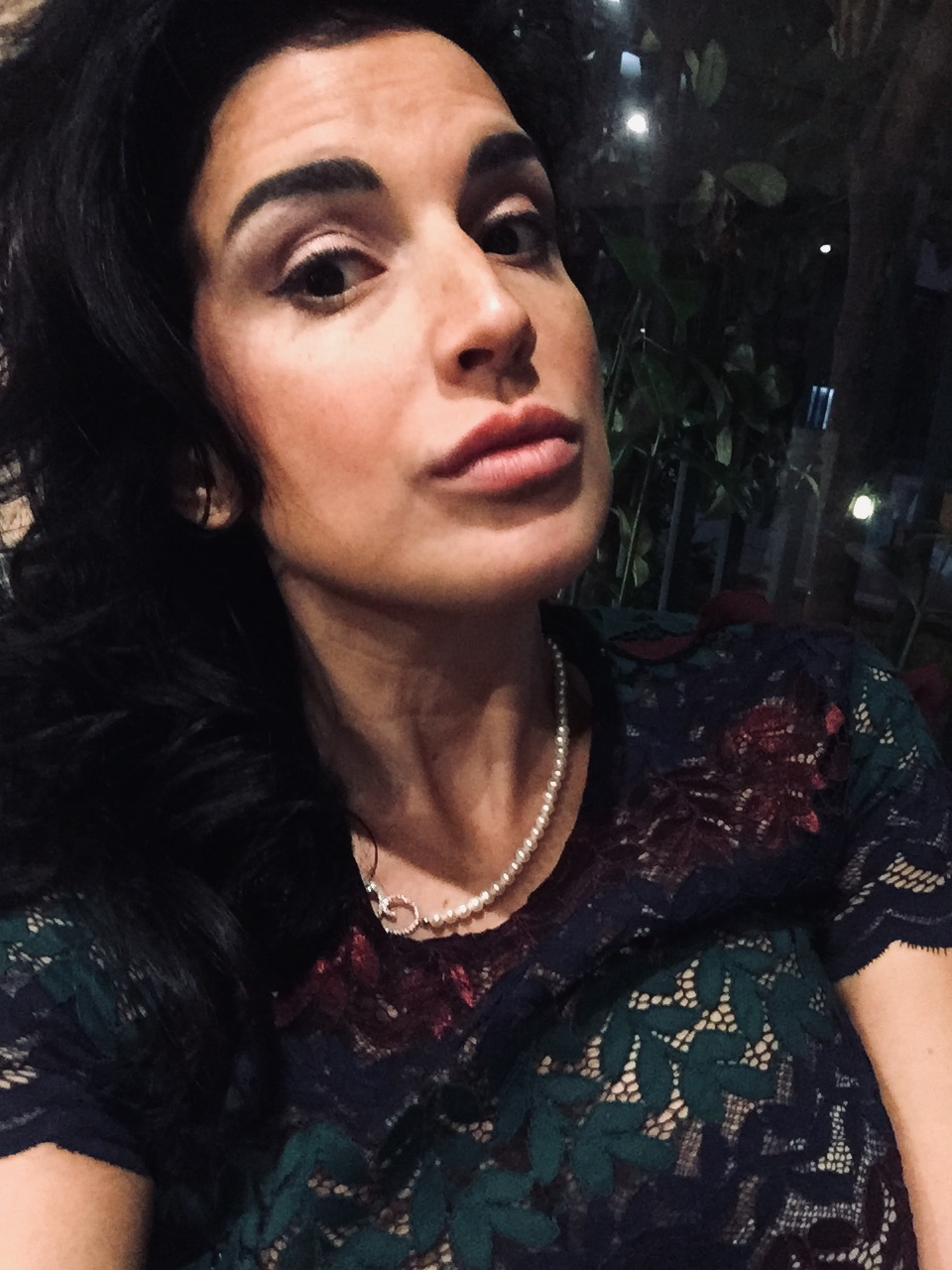
- Born: 22 March 1979 (age 47); Pompei, Italy
- Occupations: Showgirl, television and radio personality and dancer
- Years active: 2002–present
- Height: 170 cm (5 ft 7 in)
- Children: 1
- Website: ladyletizia.com

Claudia Letizia also known as Lady Letizia (born 1979 in Pompei) is an Italian actress, dancer, television and radio hostess and singer. She is known for having participated in the twelfth series of the reality show Grande Fratello, the Italian version of Big Brother.

== Biography ==
Born in Pompei 1979, Letizia grew up in San Giorgio a Cremano. She graduated as an accountant, then took dance and acting classes.

Letizia has participated in various television programs, including in 2010, when she competed under the stage name of Lady Letizia in the Sky 1 talent show Lady Burlesque, where she came in second place. The following year she was a competitor in Grande Fratello 12.

Letizia was an actress in the film L'ultima ruota del carro by Giovanni Veronesi and Il mio uomo perfetto by Nilo Sciarrone in 2018. She starred in the musical Carosone, in the Sky series 1992; and in two seasons of È arrivata la Felicità broadcast on Rai 1.

Letizia appeared as a television reviewer in various Rai and Mediaset programs, including Tiki Taka, Mattino 5 and Pomeriggio 5. She is a presenter on Radio Kiss Kiss for the program "Facciamolo adesso" ("Let's do it now"), broadcast every night.

== Television ==
- Beato tra le donne (2003)
- Ciao Darwin 5 (Canale 5, 2007)
- Lady Burlesque (Sky 1, 2010)
- Grande Fratello (Canale 5, 2011)
- Il processo del lunedì, Rai 3, (2015)
- Le Iene, Italia 1. (2015/2018)
- Tiki Taka - Il calcio è il nostro gioco
- Mattino Cinque
- Pomeriggio Cinque

== Filmography ==
=== Television ===
- 2009: 7 vite
- 2009: Un posto al sole estate
- 2010: Un posto al sole
- 2010: La nuova squadra
- 2015: 1992
- 2015–2016: È arrivata la felicità
- 2016: Un posto al sole
- 2018: È arrivata la felicità 2

=== Theater ===
- 2009: Telegaribaldi Celebration
- 2012: The show (second edition)
- 2013: Ti ricordi il Varietà?
- 2013–2014: Carosone l’americano di Napoli
- 2015–2018: C'era una volta il burlesque

== Video ==
- 2010: music video for a song by rap band Resurrection
- 2010: music video for a song by the duo Ludo Brusco & Mr Hyde

== Radio ==
- 2009: Interviewer on the Radio Marte Stereo program "Notte azzurra"
- 2010–2011: presenter on Radio Punto Zero
- 2017–2018: presenter on Radio Kiss Kiss
