= Sherlock: Case of Evil =

2002 television film directed by Graham Theakston

- Written by: Piers Ashworth
- Directed by: Graham Theakston
- Starring: James D'Arcy; Vincent D'Onofrio; Gabrielle Anwar
- Music by: Mike Moran
- Countries of origin: United States; Romania
- Original language: English

Production
- Producers: Tim Bradley; Brad Wyman
- Running time: 90 minutes

Original release
- Network: USA
- Release: October 25, 2002

Sherlock: Case of Evil is a 2002 made-for-television movie focusing on Sherlock Holmes (James D'Arcy) as a young adult in his late 20s. The story noticeably departs from the classic depiction, style and backstory of the original material.

== Plot summary ==
As the movie opens, Sherlock is in pursuit of the criminal Professor Moriarty (Vincent D'Onofrio) and apparently shoots him to death. His body cannot be found, however, as it falls in a sewer. After this incident, Holmes gains notoriety with the press and the police for his apparent killing of Moriarty, and meets Dr. Watson (Roger Morlidge), an early practitioner of autopsies, for the first time. Together, they start an investigation into the murder of several crime lords and become convinced that Moriarty is alive and behind a plot to organize drug dealing. As Moriarty is supposedly dead, Holmes finds it hard to convince Inspector Lestrade (Nicholas Gecks) of this claim. Holmes' investigation leads him to an actress (Gabrielle Anwar), who posed as a rich woman to lure Holmes into the plot. Richard E. Grant also appears as Holmes' brother, Mycroft, who was addicted to opium by Moriarty when Sherlock was young.

== Cast ==
- James D'Arcy ... Sherlock Holmes
- Roger Morlidge ... Dr. Watson
- Gabrielle Anwar ... Rebecca Doyle
- Vincent D'Onofrio ... Moriarty
- Nicholas Gecks ... Insp. Lestrade
- Peter-Hugo Daly ... Henry Coot
- Richard E. Grant ... Mycroft
- Struan Rodger ... Ben Harrington
- Mihai Bisericanu ... Sgt. Cox
- Mihai Gruia Sandu ... Dr. Cruickshank
- Constantin Bărbulescu ... Captor #1 (as Costi Barbulescu)
- Doru Dumitrescu ... Captor #2
- Constantin Vasilescu ... Goldie Duggan
- Corneliu Tigancu ... Chinese Proprietor
- Fritha Goodey ... Anna
- Ioana Abur ... Victoria
- Natalie Ester ... Pretty Young Hopeful
- Oana Ardelean ... Debutante #1
- Cristina Teodorescu ... Debutante #2
- Andreea Bălan ... Burlesque Girl
- Mihai Dinvale ... Theatre manager
- Ștefan-Dominic Voronca ... Young Holmes (as Stefan Veronca)
- Valentin Popescu ... Killer
- Radu Captari ... Pianist
- Anca Androne ... Nurse
- Adrian Huluban ... Surgeon
- Cornel Ragea ... Policeman
- Vasile Albinet ... Policeman
- Adrian Pavlovschi ... Policeman

== Critical reaction ==
Laura Fries of Variety wrote that "D'Arcy makes a convincing Holmes" and "[gives the character] the passion and drive he needs for such intense devotion to crime solving, but also the emotional weaknesses that plague him." Fries added that, despite his "questionable" English accent, "D'Onofrio captures the massive ego and appetites of Moriarty" and " offers such an intimidating physical presence", and that "[s]pecial effects coordinator Daniel Parvulescu has fun on all accounts, creating realistic props as well as a rich, atmospheric London set."

Anita Gates of The New York Times wrote: "Case of Evil is a competent, well-plotted mystery, and it's awfully pretty, thanks to the production designer (Chris Roope) and the director of photography (Lukas Strebel). ... The film has its tongue in its cheek a good bit of the time. At least the director, Graham Theakston, makes it seem tongue in cheek, going for just the right level of knowingness."

Steve Lewis of Mystery*File wrote: "I think you can be a lifelong Sherlock Holmes fan and still enjoy this movie. ... [W]hile there were several nicely done attempts to show Holmes’s deductive abilities ... there is, sad to say, no great attempt by the end of the movie to be little more than just another action flick. The atmosphere and general ambiance is nicely done, though. ... I surprised myself by warming more and more to the characters as the movie went on."

Jay Seaver of eFilmCritic panned the film, giving it a single star out of five, writing: "[L]et's just accept the idea that Sherlock Holmes needs to be sexed up and made relevant for a twenty-first century audience. Do writer/producer Piers Ashworth and director Graham Theakston manage to make an entertaining movie out of that? No. In their hands, Sherlock becomes a generic hero tortured by the past and Moriarty becomes a thug without any sort of air of mystery about him. ... The two leads, D'Arcy and D'Onofrio, are especially weak. Forget previous portrayals of Holmes and Moriarty, and just focus on their tendency to chew scenery and do little, if anything, with body language."
