= Fabrizio Biggio =

Italian actor and comedian (born 1974)

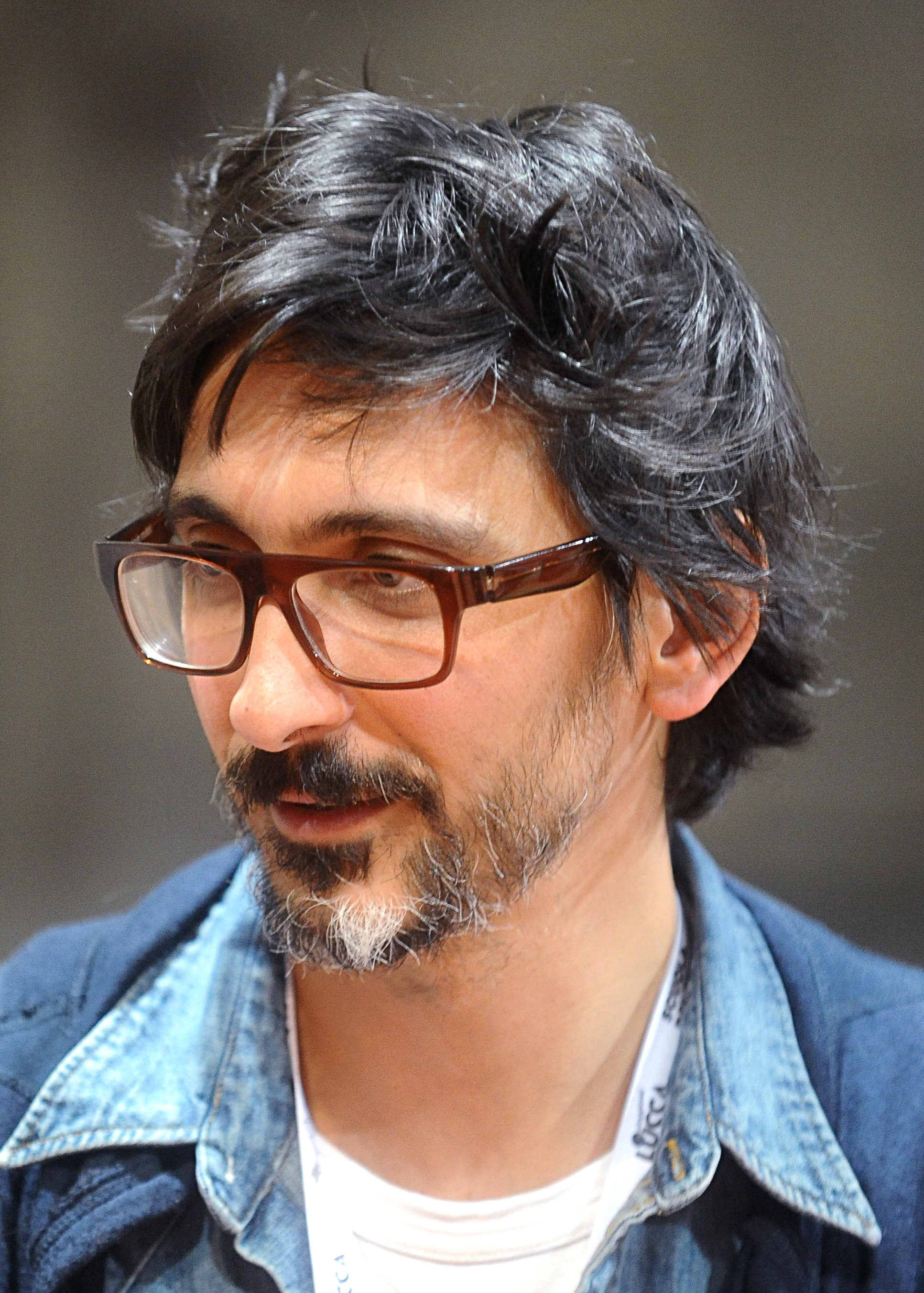
- Biggio in 2015
- Born: 27 June 1974 (age 52); Florence, Tuscany, Italy
- Occupations: Actor, comedian, TV presenter, radio host, film director, writer
- Years active: 1997–present

Fabrizio Biggio (born 27 June 1974) is an Italian actor, comedian, television presenter, radio host, film director and writer.

== Life and career ==
Born in Florence in 1974 to an Apulian father and a French mother, Biggio began his career in entertainment in the late 1990s, hosting the television programs La Zanzara in classe. He collaborated with MTV on various music and comedy shows, including MTV Mad, Hit List Italia, MTV Pets Show and sitcoms like MTV Bathroom and I soliti idioti (2009–2012), which led to two feature films: I soliti idioti: Il film (2011) and I 2 soliti idioti (2012).

Biggio has also worked as a radio host and provided voice dubbing for animated series like Beavis and Butt-Head and films such as Monsters University. In 2015, he competed alongside Francesco Mandelli at the Sanremo Music Festival, with the song "Vita d'inferno". In 2016, he hosted Stracult on Rai 2.

Between 2022 and 2023, he resumed collaborations with Mandelli on various projects, including Fiorello's Viva Rai2!. They also worked on the third film in the I soliti idioti series, I soliti idioti 3: Il ritorno, twelve years after the previous installment, which they also directed.

In February 2024, he hosted Una voce per San Marino.

== Filmography ==
Film
Year	Title	Role	Notes
2011	I soliti idioti: Il film	Gianluca De Ceglie / Various	Film debut; also writer
2012	I 2 soliti idioti	Gianluca De Ceglie / Various	Also writer
2013	Pazze di me	Luca	
2013	Third Person	Claude	
2015	La solita commedia: Inferno	Virgil / Various	Also director and writer
2017	Omicidio all'italiana	Antonello	
2018	All You Ever Wished For	Cetto	
2024	I soliti idioti 3: Il ritorno	Gianluca De Ceglie / Various	Also director and writer

Television
Year	Title	Role	Notes
2005	MTV Bathroom	Barman	
2009–2012	I soliti idioti	Various	Main role
2016	Mariottide	Tony Banderas	Episode 1x19
2018	The Generi	Dan Maverick	Episode 1x05

== Television programmes ==
- La zanzara in classe (Canale 10, 1997)
- MTV Mad (MTV, 2000–2001)
- MTV Select (MTV, 2001)
- MTV On the Beach (MTV, 2002)
- MTV Pets Show (MTV, 2004)
- TRL Awards (MTV, 2011)
- MTV Days (MTV, 2011)
- Stracult (Rai 2, 2016–2020)
- Meglio tardi che mai (Rai 2, 2017)
- Il lato positivo (Rai 2, 2021)
- Viva Rai2! (Rai 2, 2022–2024)
- Concerto del Primo Maggio (Rai 3, 2023)
- Rai: Di tutto, di tutti (RaiPlay / Rai 2, 2023)
- Una voce per San Marino (San Marino RTV, 2024)
- Viva la danza (Rai 1, 2024)
- David di Donatello (Rai 1, 2024)
- Rai: Più voci, più talento (RaiPlay / Rai 2, 2024)
