= Mădălina Diana Ghenea =

Romanian actress and model (born 1987)

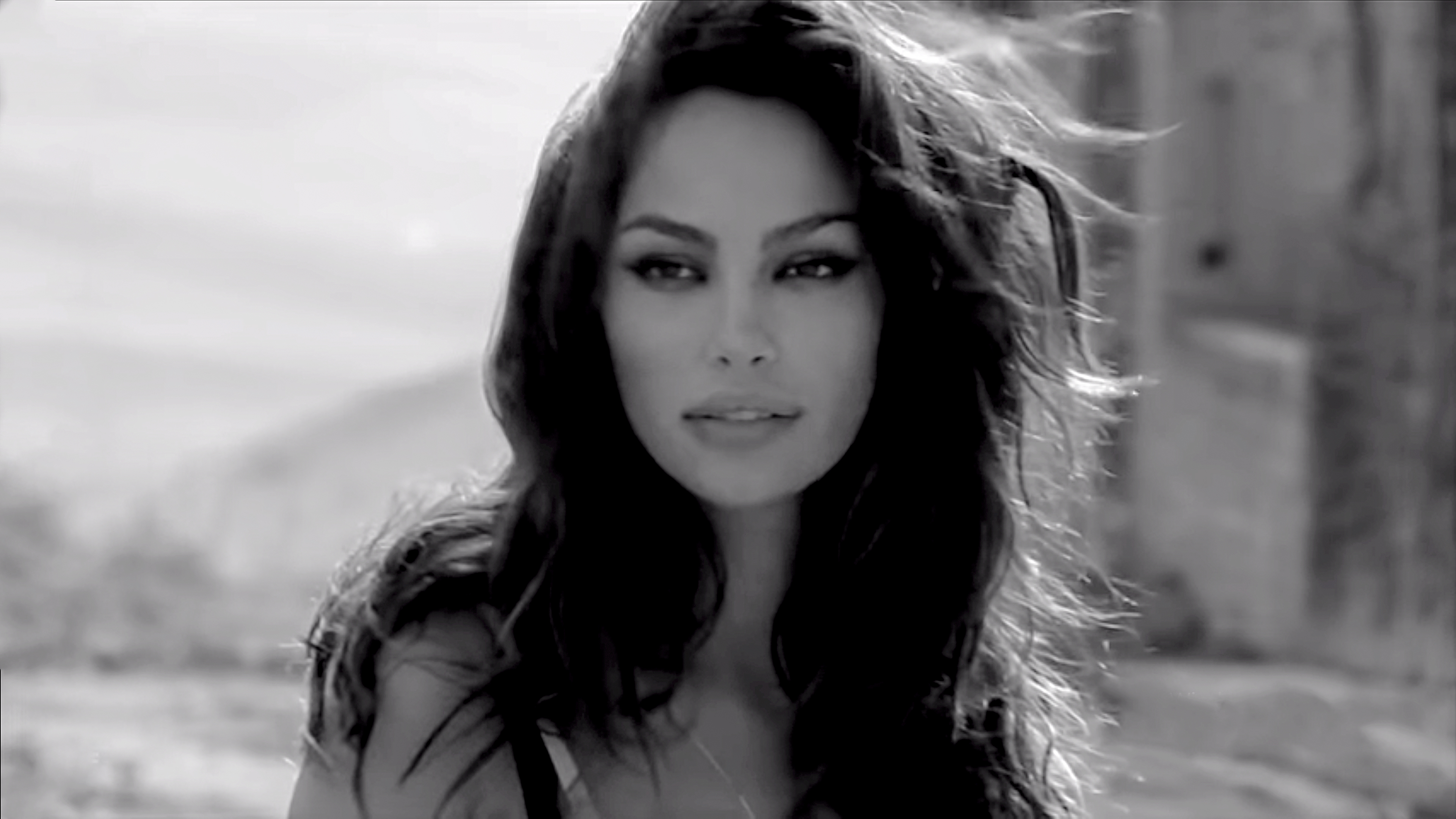
- Ghenea in 2019
- Born: 8 August 1987 (age 39); Slatina, Olt, Socialist Republic of Romania
- Education: Ion Minulescu National College
- Occupations: Actress; model
- Height: 1.80 m (5 ft 11 in)
- Children: 1
- Website: madalinagheneaofficial.com

Mădălina Diana Ghenea (Romanian: [mədəˈlina diˈana ˈɡene̯a]; born 8 August 1987) is a Romanian actress and model. Ghenea started her career in modelling when she was 15 years old, and started presenting for Gattinoni in Milan, Italy.

== Biography ==
During her career, Ghenea did fashion shows in Romania, Italy, Germany, Japan, Austria, Spain, France and South Africa, and appeared in several advertisements including Peroni, New Yorker and Quelle. She was also selected for the international calendar along with two other models from MRA agency, Catrinel Menghia and Carmen Prodan.

In 2007, she appeared in a video for Eros Ramazzotti's album The New Best of Eros Ramazzotti – Il tempo tra di noi where she appeared as Ramazotti's girlfriend. In 2010, Ghenea appeared in the sixth edition of the Italian talent show Ballando con le Stelle, her partner becoming dancer Simone Di Pasquale. In 2011, she became the brand ambassador of TRE-Italy mobile company, of the dance clothing brand DEHA, and of vintage racing cars Mille Miglia.

In 2011, she also made her debut as an actress in the role of Irina in the Italian film I solitie idioti. In 2013 she appeared in Dom Hemingway alongside Jude Law. In 2015, Ghenea appeared as Miss Universe in Paolo Sorrentino's drama film Youth. With the Italian actor Gabriel Garko, Ghenea co-hosted and supported Carlo Conti for the 2016 edition of Sanremo Music Festival. She replaced Belén Rodríguez in September 2016 as the face of the luxury brand Vanitas.

== Personal life ==
Ghenea is fluent in Romanian, Italian, Spanish and English. She has joined the organisation "Artists for Peace and Justice" for Haiti relief. Ghenea donated money for the renovation of the Maternity section of the main hospital in her hometown Slatina.

In late 2011, she was romantically involved with actor Leonardo DiCaprio. In 2012–13, she was in a relationship with actor Gerard Butler. In 2014 she was in a brief relationship with Michael Fassbender.

In March 2017, she announced on social networks she was pregnant with her first child with the Romanian millionaire Matei Stratan.

In 2023, she was in a relationship with tennis player Grigor Dimitrov.

== Filmography ==
=== Cinema ===
Year	Title	Genre	Role	Notes
2011	I soliti idioti: Il film	Comedy	Smutandissima	
2012	The Mongrel	Drama	Dorina	
2013	Dom Hemingway	Comedy, crime, drama	Paolina	
2015	Youth	Drama	Miss Universe	
2016	Zoolander 2	Comedy	Exotic woman	Cameo
2016	Smitten!	Comedy		
2019	All You Ever Wished For	Romantic Comedy	Rosalia Drago	
2021	House of Gucci	Drama	Sophia Loren	Cameo
2023	Deep Fear	Thriller	Naomi	Protagonist

=== Television ===
- 2011 Ballando con le Stelle (series 7)
- 2011 I soliti idioti
- 2013 Borgia

=== Music Videos ===
- 2007 Il tempo tra di noi – Eros Ramazzotti
- 2012 Turn Up the Radio – Madonna
- 2006 High School Musical – Gabriella Montez (Romanian voice)
- 2007 High School Musical 2 – Gabriella Montez (Romanian voice)
