= Francesco Mandelli =

Italian actor, comedian and film director (born 1979)

- Mandelli in 2024
- Born: Francesco Maria Mandelli; 3 April 1979 (age 47); Erba, Lombardy, Italy
- Occupations: Actor; comedian; film director; screenwriter; television presenter
- Years active: 1998–present

Francesco Mandelli (born 3 April 1979) is an Italian actor, comedian, screenwriter and film director. He began his career on MTV Italia and rose to prominence through the comedy television series I soliti idioti, which he co-created and starred in with Fabrizio Biggio, and its film adaptations. In 2015, the duo competed in the 65th Sanremo Music Festival with the song "Vita d'inferno". He made his feature-film directorial debut with Bene ma non benissimo (2018).

== Filmography ==
- All the Moron's Men (1999)
- Now or Never (2003)
- Manual of Love (2005)
- Natale a Miami (2005)
- Natale a New York (2006)
- Generation 1000 Euros (2009)
- I soliti idioti: Il film (2011)
- I 2 soliti idioti (2012)
- Pazze di me (2013)
- Colpi di fortuna (2013)
- La solita commedia: Inferno (2015) – also co-director
- Natale col boss (2015)
- I babysitter (2016)
- Si muore tutti democristiani (2018)
- Bene ma non benissimo (2018) – also director
- Appena un minuto (2019) – only director
- Notti in bianco, baci a colazione (2021) – also director
- La cura (2022)
- I soliti idioti 3: Il ritorno (2024) – also co-director
- Ricomincio da taaac (2024)
- Cena di classe (2026) – also director
