= James D'Arcy =

English actor and film director (born 1975)

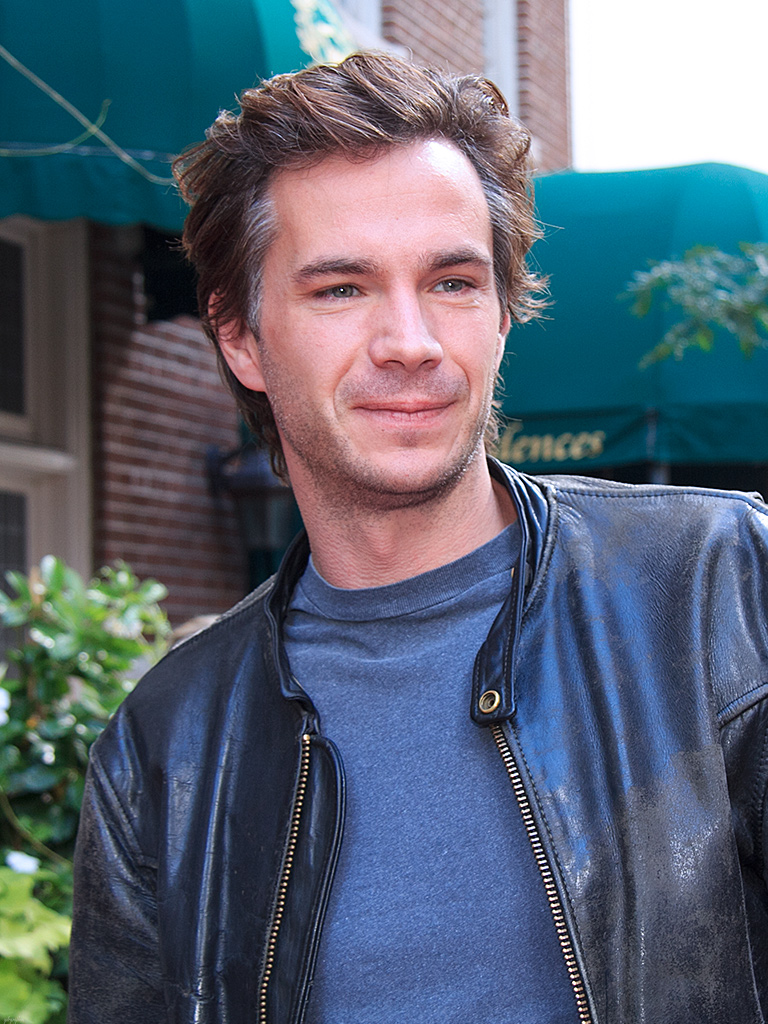
- D'Arcy in 2012
- Born: Simon Richard D'Arcy; 24 August 1975 (age 51); Amersham, Buckinghamshire, England
- Education: London Academy of Music and Dramatic Art
- Occupations: Actor; screenwriter; film director
- Years active: 1996–present

James D'Arcy (born Simon Richard D'Arcy; 24 August 1975) is an English actor, screenwriter, and film director. He is known for his portrayals of Howard Stark's butler, Edwin Jarvis, in the Marvel Cinematic Universe television series Agent Carter (2015–16) and the 2019 film Avengers: Endgame, and murder suspect Lee Ashworth in the second season of the series Broadchurch (2015). D'Arcy also co-starred in Christopher Nolan's war movies Dunkirk (2017) and Oppenheimer (2023). He wrote and directed Made in Italy (2020).

== Early life ==
Simon D'Arcy was born on 24 August 1975 in Amersham, Buckinghamshire. His father, Richard, died when he was a child. His mother, Caroline, was a nurse. She raised D'Arcy and his sister Charlotte in Fulham, London.

In 1991, after graduating from the West Sussex school Christ's Hospital, D'Arcy went to Australia, where he worked in the drama department of a school in Perth for one year. When he returned to London he entered a three-year course at the London Academy of Music and Dramatic Art (LAMDA), completing a BA in Acting in 1995.

== Career ==
His first appearances on television were small roles on the television series Silent Witness (1996) and Dalziel and Pascoe (1996), followed by roles in television films such as Ruth Rendell's Bribery and Corruption, The Canterville Ghost, and the leading role in The Ice House (all 1997). Also in 1997, he played Blifil in The History of Tom Jones, a Foundling and appeared in Wilde. In 1999, he acted in the World War I drama The Trench and also had a small role in the comedy Guest House Paradiso.

Since 2001 he has played bigger roles and leading characters in the mini-series Rebel Heart (2001 as Ernie Coyne), The Life and Adventures of Nicholas Nickleby (2001, Nicholas Nickleby) and Revelation (2001, Jake Martel). In 2002, he portrayed a young Sherlock Holmes in the television film Sherlock: Case of Evil. In 2003, he played the role of Barnaby Caspian in the film Dot the I, and the character Jim Caddon on the series P.O.W. He also gained wider recognition when he portrayed 1st Lt. Tom Pullings in Peter Weir's Master and Commander: The Far Side of the World (2003).

He appeared in the horror films Exorcist: The Beginning (2004, Father Francis), An American Haunting (2005, Richard Powell) and Rise: Blood Hunter (2007, Bishop). He also appeared on television as Derek Kettering in Agatha Christie's Poirot: The Mystery of the Blue Train (2005), as Jerry Burton in Agatha Christie's Marple: The Moving Finger, as Tiberius Gracchus in the Ancient Rome: The Rise and Fall of an Empire episode "Revolution" (2007), as Toby Clifford in Fallen Angel (2007) and as Tom Bertram in ITV's production of Mansfield Park (2007).

He lent his voice to BBC radio dramas such as Thomas Hardy's Tess of the d'Urbervilles, Bram Stoker's Dracula, and Winifred Holtby's The Crowded Street. He played the role of Duncan Atwood in Secret Diary of a Call Girl.

In 2011 he played the role of King Edward VIII in W.E., directed by Madonna. In 2012, he played Rufus Sixsmith (young and old) in addition to two other minor roles in the independent film Cloud Atlas, as well as Alfred Hitchcock and the Making of Psycho star Anthony Perkins in Hitchcock. In 2013, he played the role of Eric Zimit in After the Dark (other title: The Philosophers).

In 2014 he played the role of Lee Ashworth in series 2 of Broadchurch and appeared as the main villain in the action comedy Let's Be Cops, as a malevolent Los Angeles crime boss. In 2015, he appeared in the films Survivor and Jupiter Ascending. He starred as a British Army Colonel Winnant in Christopher Nolan's Dunkirk (2017). In 2018, he appeared in the Showtime series Homeland.

D'Arcy was a series regular in the television series Agent Carter from 2015 to 2016. In the series, he played Edwin Jarvis, the loyal butler of Howard Stark, which shares continuity with the Marvel Cinematic Universe. It was his first comedic role. He reprised his role of Edwin Jarvis in Avengers: Endgame, making D'Arcy the first to have portrayed the same character originally from an MCU TV series into an MCU film. In 2017, he appeared in the film The Snowman. D'Arcy starred in the war film Oppenheimer in 2023.

D'Arcy made his directorial debut with Made in Italy in 2020.

In 2024 he played the character of Mr Greed in the music video "HAHAHA" by American rapper Lil Dicky.

== Personal life ==
From 2002 to 2005, D'Arcy was in a relationship with Lucy Punch after they met during filming of the TV movie Come Together.

== Filmography ==
=== Film ===
Year	Title	Role	Notes
1997	Wilde	Friend	
1998	Norman Ormal: A Very Political Turtle	Crap Actor Man 2	
1998	Hiccup	Barry	Short
1999	The Trench	Pte. Colin Daventry	
1999	Guest House Paradiso	Young Groom	
2001	Revelation	Jake Martell	
2003	dot the i	Barnaby F. Caspian	
2003	Master and Commander: The Far Side of the World	Lt. Tom Pullings	
2004	Exorcist: The Beginning	Father Francis	
2005	An American Haunting	Richard Powell	
2007	Rise: Blood Hunter	Bishop	
2008	Flashbacks of a Fool	Jack Adams	
2010	Natural Selection	John Henry Wilson	Short
2011	The Flight of the Swan	Alexis	
2011	Age of Heroes	Ian Fleming	
2011	Screwed	Sam	
2011	W.E.	Edward VIII	
2012	In Their Skin	Bobby	
2012	The Domino Effect	Mark	
2012	Cloud Atlas	Rufus Sixsmith, Nurse James, Archivist	
2012	Hitchcock	Anthony Perkins	
2012	Overnight	Tom	
2013	After the Dark	Mr. Zimit	
2013	Dreams Never End	The Wolf	Short film
2014	Let's Be Cops	Mossi Kasic	
2014	Instruments of Darkness	Banquo	after Macbeth
2015	Jupiter Ascending	Maximilian Jones	
2015	Survivor	Paul Anderson	
2016	Guernica	Henry Hillard, author/journalist	About the bombing of Guernica during the Spanish Civil War
2017	Dunkirk	Colonel Winnant	
2017	The Snowman	Filip Becker	
2019	Avengers: Endgame	Edwin Jarvis	Cameo
2019	Life Like	Julian	
2020	Made in Italy	—N/a	Writer and director
2020	LX 2048	Adam Bird	
2020	Six Minutes to Midnight	Captain Drey	
2021	Warning	God	Voice
2022	North of Normal	Sam	
2022	Banking on Mr. Toad	Kenneth Grahame	
2023	Oppenheimer	Patrick Blackett	

=== Television ===
Year	Title	Role	Notes
1996	Silent Witness	Student	Episode: "Long Days, Short Nights: Part 1"
1996	Dalziel and Pascoe	Franny Roote	Episode: "An Advancement of Learning"
1996	Brookside	Martin Cathcart	Episode: "Things to Sort Out"
1997	The Canterville Ghost	Lord Cheshire	TV film
1997	The Ruth Rendell Mysteries	Nicholas Hawthorne	2 episodes
1997	The Ice House	Jonathan Maybury	TV film
1997	A Dance to the Music of Time	Nicholas Jenkins	Miniseries; episode: "The Twenties"
1997	The History of Tom Jones: A Foundling	Blifil	Miniseries; 5 episodes
1999	Sunburn	Phil	1 episode
2001	Rebel Heart	Ernie Coyne	Miniseries; 4 episodes
2001	The Life and Adventures of Nicholas Nickleby	Nicholas Nickleby	TV film, principal role
2001	Dark Realm	Dean	Episode: "Party On"
2002	Come Together	Jack	TV film
2002	Sir Gawain and the Green Knight	Sir Gawain (voice in animated film)	Animation
2002	Sherlock: Case of Evil	Sherlock Holmes	TV film
2003	P.O.W.	Jim Caddon	6 episodes
2005	Agatha Christie's Poirot	Derek Kettering	Episode: "The Mystery of the Blue Train"
2006	Agatha Christie's Marple	Jerry Burton	Episode: "The Moving Finger"
2006	Ancient Rome: The Rise and Fall of an Empire	Tiberius Gracchus	Episode: "Revolution"
2006	The Battle for Rome	Tiberius Gracchus	TV film
2007	Them	Cain Johnson	TV film
2007	Green	Sy	TV film
2007	Fallen Angel	Toby Clifford	Miniseries; episode: "The Judgement of Strangers"
2007	Mansfield Park	Tom Bertram	TV film
2007	The Inspector Lynley Mysteries	Guy Thompson	Episode: "Know Thine Enemy"
2008	Bonekickers	Captain Roberts	Episode: "The Lines of War"
2008	The Commander	Jerry	TV film
2009	The Eastmans	Dr. Peter Eastman	Unsold pilot
2009	Into the Storm	Jock Colville	TV film
2009	Virtuality	Dr. Roger Fallon	TV film
2009–10	Secret Diary of a Call Girl	Duncan	8 episodes
2011	The Closer	Professor Alex Banks	
2012	The Making of a Lady	Captain Alec Osborn	TV film
2012	Those Who Kill	Thomas Schaeffer	Main role
2015	Broadchurch	Lee Ashworth	Series 2
2015–16	Agent Carter	Edwin Jarvis	Main role; 18 episodes
2018	Homeland	Anson	Recurring role
2018	Das Boot	Sinclair	
2019	The Rook	Andrew Bristol	Miniseries
2019	The Hot Zone	Travis Rhodes	Miniseries
2021	Leonardo	Ludovico Sforza	Main role
2021	Red Election	Adam Cornwell	
2022	Deadline	James	Main role
2022	Grace	DSI Cassian Pewe	Series 2
2024	Constellation	Magnus	Main role
2024	What If...?	Edwin Jarvis (voice)	Episode: "What If... Agatha Went to Hollywood?"
2025	NCIS: Tony & Ziva	Henry Rayner-Hunt	Main role
2026	VisionQuest	J.A.R.V.I.S.	Main role; 2 episodes

== Awards ==
- Nominated for the Ian Charleson Award in 2002 (Outstanding Performance in a Classical Role) for Edward II.
