= Grande Fratello season 9 =

Grande Fratello
- Season 9
- Presented by: Alessia Marcuzzi
- No. of days: 99
- No. of housemates: 23
- Winner: Ferdi Berisa
- Runner-up: Marcello Torre Calabria

Release
- Original network: Canale 5
- Original release: 20 January – 20 April 2009

Season chronology
- ← Previous; Season 8 Next → Season 10

Grande Fratello 9 is the ninth season of the Italian version of the reality show franchise Big Brother. The show began on 12 January 2009 and concluded on 20 April 2009 and was hosted by Alessia Marcuzzi. Ferdi Berisa was the winner of the ninth season, she received a €300,000 prize.

== Housemates ==
Housemates	Age	Birthplace	Occupation	Day entered	Day exited	Status
Ferdi Berisa	21	Podgorica, Montenegro	Chef	1	99	Winner
Federica Rosatelli	30	Velletri	Fashion Agent	1	99	Runner-up
Cristina Del Basso	21	Varese	Student	1	99	3rd Place
Gianluca Zito	32	Naples	Company director	1	99	4th Place
Francesca Fioretti	23	Maddaloni	Model	50	92	16th Evicted
Alberto Scrivano	32	Genoa	Mooring boat	1	92	15th Evicted
Sabrina "Siria" Di Fazio	31	Pomigliano d'Arco	Fire eater	1	92	14th Evicted
Roberto Salvi	26	Rome	Personal trainer	50	87	13th Evicted
Vanessa Ravizza	24	Casorate Primo	Bartender	1	81	12th Evicted
Vittorio Marcelli	37	Rome	Surfer	1	78	11th Evicted
Geronimo "Jerry" Longo	31	Locri	Employee	8	71	10th Evicted
Monica Riva	23	Ascoli Piceno	Student	50	71	9th Evicted
Laura Drzewicka	22	Hamburg, Germany	Photomodel	29	64	8th Evicted
Claudia Perna	25	Palermo	Volunteer	1	57	7th Evicted
Tommaso De Mottoni y Palacios	30	Trieste	Business owner	36	50	6th Evicted
Annachiara Simonetti	25	Naples	Pharmacist	1	43	5th Evicted
Paolo Mari	35	Mantua	Plumber and model	36	41	Ejected
Nicola Molinari	28	Gavardo	Architect	1	36	4th Evicted
Marco Mazzanti	23	Copparo	Student and soccer player	1	29	3rd Evicted
Marcello Torre Calabri	31	Bergamo	Baker	1	29	Ejected
Leonia Coccia	23	Rome	Butcher	8	22	2nd Evicted
Daniela Martani	35	Rome	Flight attendant	1	22	Walked
Fabrizio Cimmino	31	Ivrea	Butler	1	15	1st Evicted

== Nominations table ==
	Week 2	Week 3	Week 4	Week 5	Week 6		Week 7	Week 8	Week 9		Week 10		Week 11	Week 12			Week 13			Week 14 Final	
	Week 2	Week 3	Week 4	Week 5	Day 36	Day 43	Week 7	Week 8	Day 57	Day 64	Day 64	Day 71	Week 11	Day 78	Day 81	Day 87	Day 87	Day 92		Week 14 Final	
Ferdi	Fabrizio	Vittorio; Federica	Marco	Alberto	Vanessa	Claudia to save	Tommaso; Alberto	Laura; Claudia	Laura; Roberto	Alberto; Monica; Vittorio	Monica; Cristina	Nominated	Alberto; Vittorio	Alberto; Roberto	Roberto; Marcello	Nominated	Siria; Cristina	Francesca to save	Cristina; Marcello	Winner (Day 99)	
Federica	Fabrizio	Ferdi; Leonia	Siria	Annachiara	Nomination canceled	Annachiara; Claudia; Vittorio	Tommaso; Vittorio	Claudia; Vittorio	Monica; Vittorio	Monica to nominate	Monica; Cristina	Nominated	Cristina; Vittorio	Francesca; Roberto	Francesca; Roberto	Nominated	Francesca; Siria	Gianluca to save	Francesca; Cristina	Runner-Up (Day 99)	
Cristina	Annachiara	Annachiara; Alberto	Nicola	Annachiara	Nomination canceled	Claudia to save	Tommaso; Alberto	Jerry; Vanessa	Francesca; Monica	Alberto to nominate	Francesca; Vanessa	Roberto to save	Marcello; Alberto	Alberto; Vanessa	Alberto; Marcello	Gianluca to save	Marcello; Ferdi	Gianluca to save	Marcello; Ferdi	Third place (Day 99)	
Gianluca	Fabrizio	Federica; Ferdi	Marco	Nicola	Nomination canceled	Vittorio to save	Tommaso; Jerry	Laura; Claudia	Francesca; Monica	Monica to nominate	Ferdi; Marcello	Exempt	Roberto; Francesca	Roberto; Vanessa	Siria; Roberto	Nominated	Siria; Francesca	Gianluca to save	Francesca; Ferdi	Fourth place (Day 99)	
Francesca	Not in House							Exempt	Gianluca; Cristina	Vittorio to nominate	Gianluca; Cristina	Ferdi to save	Gianluca; Marcello	Vanessa; Alberto	Roberto; Marcello	Ferdi to save	Marcello; Siria	Ferdi to save	Marcello; Cristina	Evicted (Day 92)	
Alberto	Fabrizio	Leonia; Ferdi	Siria	Vanessa	Nomination canceled	Claudia to save	Tommaso; Jerry	Ferdi; Jerry	Monica; Cristina	Nominated	Cristina; Monica	Nominated	Ferdi; Cristina	Francesca; Ferdi	Francesca; Ferdi	Nominated	Ferdi; Francesca	Gianluca to save	Evicted (Day 92)		
Siria	Vanessa	Leonia; Claudia	Vittorio	Marcello	Marcello	Claudia to save	Tommaso; Ferdi	Laura; Ferdi	Laura; Francesca	Monica to nominate	Vanessa; Monica	Vittorio to save	Marcello; Ferdi	Vanessa; Marcello	Marcello; Francesca	Alberto to save	Marcello; Ferdi	Evicted (Day 92)			
Roberto	Not in House							Exempt	Monica; Francesca	Monica to nominate	Monica; Francesca	Nominated	Marcello; Gianluca	Francesca; Vanessa	Francesca; Marcello	Evicted (Day 87)					
Vanessa	Annachiara	Annachiara; Ferdi	Vittorio	Ferdi	Nomination canceled	Annachiara to save	Tommaso; Alberto	Claudia; Laura	Cristina; Monica	Monica to nominate	Monica; Cristina	Alberto to save	Cristina; Francesca	Francesca; Roberto	Evicted (Day 81)						
Vittorio	Fabrizio	Federica; Ferdi	Nicola	Nicola	Nomination canceled	Nominated	Tommaso; Jerry	Marcello; Ferdi	Marcello; Francesca	Nominated	Marcello; Ferdi	Nominated	Ferdi; Marcello	Evicted (Day 78)							
Jerry	Exempt	Ferdi; Annachiara	Marco	Alberto	Nomination canceled	Vittorio to save	Alberto; Tommaso	Claudia; Laura	Laura; Cristina	Monica to nominate	Monica; Alberto	Nominated	Evicted (Day 71)								
Monica	Not in House							Exempt	Vanessa; Laura	Nominated	Vanessa; Jerry	Evicted (Day 71)									
Laura	Not in House			Exempt	Nomination canceled	Vittorio to save	Tommaso; Ferdi	Marcello; Ferdi	Monica; Roberto	Evicted (Day 64)											
Claudia	Fabrizio	Federica; Leonia	Siria	Nicola	Nomination canceled	Nominated	Tommaso; Marcello	Marcello; Laura	Evicted (Day 57)												
Tommaso	Not in House				Exempt		Gianluca; Jerry	Evicted (Day 50)													
Annachiara	Fabrizio	Vittorio; Leonia	Vittorio	Claudia	Nomination canceled	Nominated	Evicted (Day 43)														
Paolo	Not in House				Exempt	Ejected (Day 41)															
Nicola	Annachiara	Vittorio; Annachiara	Marco	Vittorio	Nomination canceled	Evicted (Day 36)															
Marco	Annachiara	Ferdi; Marcello	Siria	Evicted (Day 29)																	
Marcello	Annachiara	Claudia; Vittorio	Vittorio	Ejected (Day 29)																	
Leonia	Exempt	Annachiara; Vanessa	Evicted (Day 22)																		
Daniela	Siria	Exempt	Walked (Day 22)																		
Fabrizio	Annachiara	Evicted (Day 15)																			
Notes	^{1}, ^{2}, ^{3}, ^{4}	^{5}	^{2}	none		^{6}	^{7}	^{8}	^{9}	^{10}	none	^{11}, ^{12}	^{13}	none		^{14}	none	^{15}	^{16}	none	
Up for eviction	Fabrizio; Federica	Annachiara; Ferdi; Leonia	Marco; Siria; Vittorio	Alberto; Federica; Nicola	Nomination canceled	Annachiara; Federica	Alberto; Jerry; Tommaso	Claudia; Federica; Ferdi; Laura	Cristina; Federica; Laura; Monica; Roberto	Monica	Federica; Monica	Federica; Jerry	Alberto; Cristina; Federica; Ferdi; Francesca; Gianluca; Vittorio	Alberto; Federica; Roberto; Vanessa	Federica; Francesca; Roberto	Federica	Federica; Ferdi; Francesca; Siria	Alberto; Cristina; Federica; Ferdi; Francesca	Cristina; Federica; Ferdi; Francesca	Cristina; Federica; Ferdi; Gianluca	
Walked	none	Daniela	none																		
Ejected	none		Federica	none	Paolo	none															
Evicted	Fabrizio; 62% to evict	Leonia ?% to evict	Marco; 70% to evict	Nicola; 55% to evict	Nomination canceled	Annachiara; 78% to evict	Tommaso; 56% to evict	Claudia; 55% to evict	Laura; 32% to evict	Monica; 44% to save	Monica; 71% to evict	Jerry; 88% to evict	Vittorio; 27% to evict	Vanessa; 68% to evict	Roberto; 49% to evict	Federica ?% to save	Siria; 63% to evict	Alberto; 37% to evict	Francesca; 59% to evict	Gianluca; 4% (out of 4)	Cristina; 14% (out of 3)
Evicted	Fabrizio; 62% to evict	Leonia ?% to evict	Marco; 70% to evict	Nicola; 55% to evict	Nomination canceled	Annachiara; 78% to evict	Tommaso; 56% to evict	Claudia; 55% to evict	Laura; 32% to evict	Monica; 44% to save	Monica; 71% to evict	Jerry; 88% to evict	Vittorio; 27% to evict	Vanessa; 68% to evict	Roberto; 49% to evict	Federica ?% to save	Siria; 63% to evict	Alberto; 37% to evict	Francesca; 59% to evict	Federica; 49.9% (out of 2)	Ferdi; 50.1% to win

=== Notes ===
- ^1 Jerry and Leonia were exempt as they were new Housemates.
- ^2 The public was voting for housemates who they wanted to be immuned from nominations, ten housemates who received the most votes would be immune.
- ^3 As the housemate who received the most votes from the public Alberto was told he could give immunity to any housemate that did not already have it, he chose to give immunity to Vittorio.
- ^4 In round one of nominations housemates had to nominate one of the four housemates who did not have immunity.
- ^5 Daniela was awarded immunity by the producers as they considered her to be the best at the weekly task. Because of her immunity, she was not allowed to nominate.
- ^6 Since last week's nominations were voided Big brother decided to have Marcello nominate three housemates that would face eviction. From the three housemates, Marcello chose to face eviction the other housemates would vote to save one of them.
- ^7 In round six of nominations all-female housemates were immune from eviction.
- ^8 In round seven of nominations Cristina was given immunity by Big brother, Alberto was also given immunity via a public vote.
- ^9 In round eight of nominations Siria was given immunity by Big brother.
- ^10 In round nine of nominations Ferdi had to choose three housemates who would not be immune from eviction. He chose Alberto, Monica and Vittorio. The other housemates had to choose one of the three to face the public vote.
- ^11 In round eleven of nominations all-male housemates were initially nominated for evictions and all-female housemates, who were exempt, had to vote to save one male housemate from eviction.
- ^12 In round eleven of nominations Gianluca was given immunity by Big brother.
- ^13 In round twelve of nominations Vanessa was given immunity by Big brother.
- ^14 In round fifteen of nominations all-male housemates were initially nominated for evictions and all-female housemates, who were exempt, had to vote to save one male housemate from eviction.
- ^15 In round seventeen of nominations all housemates were initially nominated for eviction however Big brother told the housemates that they could vote to save any housemate from nomination, the person who received the most votes would be safe.
- ^16 The immunity Gianluca had earned from the vote in round seventeen of nominations carried over into round eighteen.
