= Enrico Lando =

Italian film director

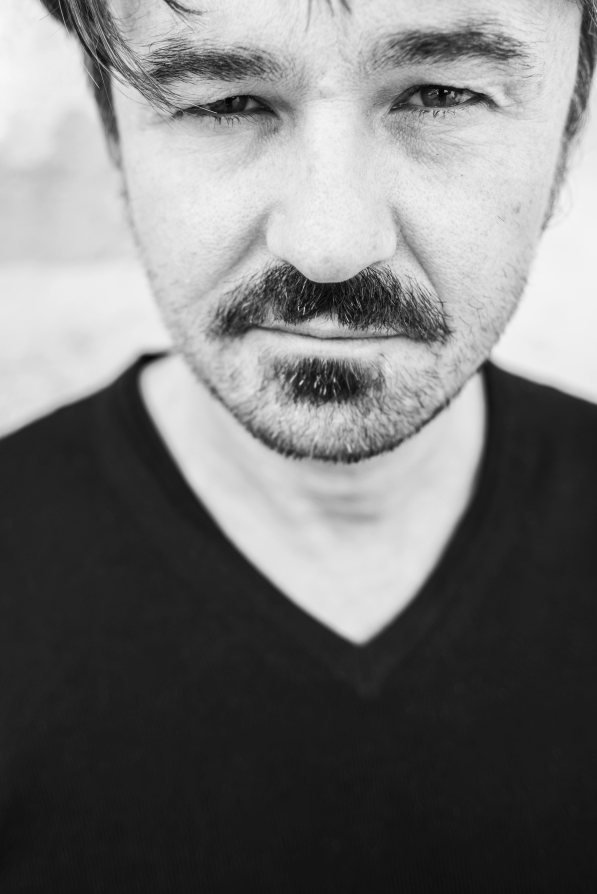
- Born: 21 July 1966 (age 59); Padua, Veneto, Italy
- Occupations: Film director, screenwriter

Enrico Lando (born 21 July 1966) is an Italian film director and screenwriter.

== Filmography ==
- I soliti idioti: Il film (2011)
- I 2 soliti idioti (2012)
- Amici come noi (2014)
- Quel bravo ragazzo (2016)
- Scappo a casa (2019)
