= BBX =

BBX may refer to

- BBX (gene), bobby sox homolog, a human gene
- BBX-OS, a former proposed name for RIM's Blackberry 10 OS
- Berrys' Broking Exchange, an online trading platform operated by Berry Brothers and Rudd
- Scion bbX, a concept car
- Wings Field (IATA code BBX), a general aviation airport in Blue Bell, Pennsylvania

== See also ==
- BB10 (disambiguation)
