= BB11 =

BB11 can refer to:

- BB11, a postcode district in the BB postcode area
- Big Brother 11 (disambiguation), a television programme in various versions
  - Bigg Boss 11 (disambiguation), Indian versions of the TV franchise
