= BB10 =

BB10 may refer to:

- Big Brother 10 (disambiguation), a television programme in various versions
  - Bigg Boss 10 (disambiguation), Indian versions of the TV franchise
- BlackBerry 10, a mobile operating system for the BlackBerry line of smartphones
- USS Maine (BB-10), a US Navy ship
- BB 10 (keelboat), a sailboat class
- BB10, a postcode district in the BB postcode area, England

== See also ==
- BBX (disambiguation)
