= Big Brother 10 =

Big Brother 10 is the tenth season of various versions of Big Brother and may refer to:

- Big Brother 10 (U.S.), the 2008 edition of the U.S. version
- Gran Hermano Spain (season 10), the 2008-2009 edition of the Spanish version
- Big Brother 10 (UK), the 2009 edition of the UK version
- Grande Fratello (season 10), the 2009–2010 edition of the Italian version
- Big Brother Germany (season 10), the 2010 edition of the German version
- Big Brother Brasil 10, the 2010 edition of the Brazilian version
- Big Brother 10 (Australia), the 2013 edition of Big Brother Australia
- Bigg Boss 10 (disambiguation)
  - Bigg Boss (Hindi season 10), tenth season of Big Brother in India in Hindi
  - Bigg Boss Kannada (season 10), tenth season of Big Brother in India in Kannada

== See also ==
- Big Brother (franchise)
- Big Brother (disambiguation)
