= BB9 =

BB9 can refer to:

- BB9, a postcode district in the BB postcode area
- Black Brant IX, a Canadian sounding rocket, see Black Brant (rocket)
- Big Brother 9 (disambiguation), a television programme in various versions
  - Bigg Boss 9 (disambiguation), Indian versions of the TV franchise
