= Bigg Boss 9 =

Bigg Boss 9 is the ninth season of various versions of Bigg Boss (an Indian adaptation of the reality game show Big Brother):

- Bigg Boss (Hindi season 9)
- Bigg Boss Kannada (season 9)
- Bigg Boss Telugu (season 9)
- Bigg Boss Tamil (season 9)

== See also ==
- Big Brother 9 (disambiguation)
- Bigg Boss (disambiguation)
- Bigg Boss 8 (disambiguation)
- Bigg Boss 10 (disambiguation)
- BB9 (disambiguation)
