= Big Brother 9 =

Big Brother 9 is the ninth season of various versions of Big Brother and may refer to:

- Gran Hermano Spain (season 9), the 2007 Spanish edition of Big Brother
- Big Brother 9 (UK), the 2008 edition of Big Brother UK
- Big Brother 9 (U.S.), the 2008 edition of Big Brother U.S.
- Big Brother Germany (season 9), the 2008–2009 edition of Big Brother Germany
- Grande Fratello (season 9), the 2009 Italian edition of Big Brother
- Big Brother Brasil 9, the 2009 edition of Big Brother Brasil
- Big Brother 9 (Australia), the 2012 edition of Big Brother Australia
- Big Brother 2014 (Finland), the 2014 edition of Big Brother in Finland
- Big Brother Africa 9, the 2014 edition of the African version
- Bigg Boss 9 (disambiguation)
  - Bigg Boss 9, ninth season of Big Brother in India in Hindi
  - Bigg Boss Kannada (season 9), ninth season of Big Brother in India in Kannada

== See also ==
- Big Brother (franchise)
- Big Brother (disambiguation)
