= Bigg Boss 11 =

Bigg Boss 11 is the eleventh season of various versions of Bigg Boss (an Indian adaptation of the reality game show Big Brother):

- Bigg Boss (Hindi season 11)
- Bigg Boss Kannada (season 11)

== See also ==
- Big Brother 11 (disambiguation)
- Bigg Boss (disambiguation)
- Bigg Boss 10 (disambiguation)
- Bigg Boss 12 (disambiguation)
- BB11 (disambiguation)
