= Big Brother 11 =

Big Brother 11 is the eleventh season of various versions of Big Brother and may refer to:

- Big Brother 11 (U.S.), the 2009 edition of Big Brother in the U.S.
- Gran Hermano Spain (season 11), the 2009-2010 edition of Big Brother in Spain
- Big Brother 11 (UK), the 2010 edition of Big Brother in the UK
- Grande Fratello (season 11), the 2010-2011 edition of Big Brother in Italy
- Big Brother Brasil 11, the 2011 edition of Big Brother in Brazil
- Big Brother Germany (season 11), the 2011 edition of Big Brother in Germany
- Big Brother Australia (season 11), the 2014 edition of "Big Brother" in Australia
- Bigg Boss 11 (disambiguation)
  - Bigg Boss 11, eleventh season of Big Brother in India in Hindi
  - Bigg Boss 11, eleventh season of Big Brother in India in Kannada

== See also ==
- Big Brother (franchise)
- Big Brother (disambiguation)
