= Bigg Boss 10 =

Bigg Boss 10 is the tenth season of various versions of Bigg Boss (an Indian adaptation of the reality game show Big Brother):

- Bigg Boss (Hindi season 10)
- Bigg Boss Kannada (season 10)
- Bigg Boss (Telugu season 10)
- Bigg Boss (Tamil season 10)

== See also ==
- Big Brother 10 (disambiguation)
- Bigg Boss (disambiguation)
- Bigg Boss 9 (disambiguation)
- Bigg Boss 11 (disambiguation)
- BB10 (disambiguation)
