= Grande Fratello season 10 =

Grande Fratello
- Season 10
- Presented by: Alessia Marcuzzi
- No. of days: 134
- No. of housemates: 26
- Winner: Mauro Marin
- Runner-up: Giorgio Ronchini

Release
- Original network: Canale 5
- Original release: 26 October 2009 – 8 March 2010

Season chronology
- ← Previous; Season 9 Next → Season 11

Grande Fratello 10 was the tenth season of the Italian version of the reality show franchise Big Brother. The show premiered on 26 October 2009 and concluded on 8 March 2010. Alessia Marcuzzi returned as the main host of the show. The winner of the season, Mauro Marin, received a €250,000 grand prize.

== Housemates ==
- On Day 1 (October 26, 2009) 16 housemates entered the Grande Fratello house; that same night potential housemates Luca Magnani and Alessia Giovagnoli lost the chance to enter the house by losing a public vote and the housemates vote, respectively.
- On Day 8 (November 2, 2009), Gabriele, Mauro, and Veronica entered the house followed by Daniele and Mattia on November 23, 2009 (Day 29).
- Day 43 (December 7, 2009) welcomed Sarah and Dominique.
- On Day 64 (December 28, 2009), the housemates saw the return of Alessia who was evicted by the male housemates back on Day 1 and the addition of Nicola Pappalepore.
- On Day 85, Gianluca Bedin entered as the last housemate of the edition.

Housemates	Age	Birthplace	Occupation	Day entered	Day exited	Status
Mauro Marin	29	Castelfranco Veneto	Butcher	8	134	Winner
Giorgio Ronchini	26	Venice	Representative	1	134	Runner-up
Cristina Pignataro	26	Milan	Teacher	1	134	3rd Place
Alberto Baiocco	26	Vasto	Hotelier	1	134	4th Place
Mara Adriani	22	Rome	Employee	1	127	20th Evicted
Maicol Berti	22	Ostellato	Unemployed	1	127	19th Evicted
Carmen Andolina	20	Bagheria	Waitress	1	120	18th Evicted
Veronica Ciardi	24	Rome	Cubist and educator	8	120	17th Evicted
Carmela Gualtieri	32	Aci Trezza	Business owner	1	113	16th Evicted
Gianluca Bedin	36	Terracina	Fashion designer	85	113	Walked
Alessia Giovagnoli	25	Gualdo Tadino	Student	1; 64	1; 106	15th Evicted
Nicola Pappalepore de Nicolai	25	Noci	Business owner	64	99	14th Evicted
Massimo Scattarella	34	Bari	Bodyguard	1	92	Ejected
Sarah Nile	24	Naples	Model	43	92	13th Evicted
Daniele Santoianni	28	Termoli	Business owner	29	85	12th Evicted
George Leonard	27	Terni	Personal trainer	1	78	11th Evicted
Marco Mosca	18	Lanzo Torinese	Hairdresser	1	71	10th Evicted
Dominique La Rosa	25	Bolzano	Dental assistant	43	64	9th Evicted
Tullio Tomasino	23	Trecastagni	Fashion representative	1	57	8th Evicted
Mattia Mor	28	Genoa	Business owner	29	50	7th Evicted
Diletta Franceschetti	29	Rome	Student	1	43	6th Evicted
Gabriele Dario Belli	38	Rome	Warehouse worker	8	36	5th Evicted
Camila Sant'Ana	24	Sorocaba, Brazil	Photomodel	1	29	4th Evicted
Davide Vallicelli	29	Codigoro	Steward	1	22	3rd Evicted
Sabrina Passante	21	Brindisi	Student	1	22	2nd Evicted
Daniela Caneo	32	Alghero	Business owner	1	15	1st Evicted

== Housemate exchange ==
On December 17, 2009, the Spanish version of Big Brother called Gran Hermano 11 revealed a housemate exchange with another country will take place. It was revealed the exchange will be with Grande Fratello; the decision most likely comes as the television station that programs the Spanish and Italian versions of Big Brother are owned by the same company, Mediaset. On December 29, during the spin-off show of Gran Hermano: El Debate, it was shown to the Gran Hermano housemates that the Italian housemates taking part of the exchange will be Carmela and Massimo; they arrived at the Gran Hermano house on January 3, 2010; that same night it was announced that the Gran Hermano housemates involved in the exchange are Saray and Gerardo. The Gran Hermano housemates arrived the next day in the Grande Fratello house (Day 71) and stayed till January 9 (Day 77). Carmela and Massimo left the Gran Hermano house early January 10 and returned to the Grande Fratello house on January 11 (Day 78) during the eviction show.

== Nominations table ==
	Week 1	Week 2	Week 3		Week 4	Week 5	Week 6	Week 7		Week 8	Week 9	Week 10	Week 11	Week 12	Week 13	Week 14	Week 15	Week 16	Week 17		Week 18		Week 19 Final	
	Week 1	Week 2	Day 15	Day 22	Week 4	Week 5	Week 6	Day 43	Day 50	Week 8	Week 9	Week 10	Week 11	Week 12	Week 13	Week 14	Week 15	Week 16	Day 113	Day 120	Day 120	Day 127	Week 19 Final	
Mauro	Not in House	Exempt	Mara; Sabrina	Giorgio	Exempt	Massimo; Maicol	Marco; Mara	Mattia; Mara	Exempt	Carmen; Marco	Dominique; Giorgio	Carmen; Marco	Carmen; George	Exempt	Sarah; Carmela	Alessia to save	Carmela; Mara	Carmela; Mara	Maicol; Carmen	Carmen	Maicol; Mara	Cristina to save	Winner (Day 134)	
Giorgio	Cristina	Daniela; Mara	Sabrina; Cristina	Nominated	Mara; Camila	Mauro; Marco	Mara; Diletta	Mara; Daniele	Exempt	Marco; Mara	Dominique; Sarah	Marco; Daniele	Sarah; George	Alessia; Nicola	Veronica; Sarah	Exempt	Alessia; Veronica	Mauro; Gianluca	Veronica; Mauro	Cristina	Mauro; Cristina	Alberto to save	Runner-Up (Day 134)	
Cristina	Nominated	Daniela; Diletta	Davide; Giorgio	Davide	Tullio; Camila	Massimo; George	Tullio; Diletta	Mattia; Mara	Daniele to nominate	Tullio; Marco	Dominique; Daniele	Daniele; Marco	George; Daniele	Alessia; Daniele	Alessia; Mauro	Nominated	Mauro; Gianluca	Gianluca; Mauro	Mauro; Veronica	Mauro	Mauro; Alberto	Mara to save	Third Place (Day 134)	
Alberto	Cristina	Daniela; Carmela	Mara to save	Giorgio	Exempt	Gabriele; Mauro	Diletta; Giorgio	Carmen; Mattia	Exempt	Carmen; Tullio	Dominique; Sarah	Daniele; Carmen	Sarah; Daniele	Alessia; Daniele	Alessia; Sarah	Mara to save	Alessia; Gianluca	Gianluca; Veronica	Mauro; Veronica	Carmen	Maicol; Cristina	Giorgio to save	Fourth Place (Day 134)	
Mara	Not eligible	Daniela; Tullio	Sabrina; Giorgio	Giorgio	Giorgio; Tullio	Mauro; Gabriele	Giorgio; Tullio	Carmen; Mattia	Daniele to nominate	Tullio; Giorgio	Dominique; Sarah	Daniele; Giorgio	Sarah; Daniele	Sarah; Daniele	Sarah; Veronica	Nominated	Mauro; Alessia	Mauro; Gianluca	Mauro; Veronica	Mauro	Mauro; Giorgio	Alberto to save	Evicted (Day 127)	
Maicol	Cristina	Mara to save	Exempt	Davide	Exempt	Mauro; Gabriele	Diletta; Marco	Daniele; Mara	Exempt	Marco; Tullio	Dominique; Daniele	Daniele; Marco	Daniele; George	Alessia; Daniele	Alessia; Sarah	Cristina to save	Mauro; Alessia	Mauro; Gianluca	Mauro; Veronica	Mara	Mauro; Alberto	Evicted (Day 127)		
Carmen	Not eligible	Daniela; Carmela	Mara; Davide	Davide	Tullio; Veronica	Alberto; George	Diletta; Tullio	Mara; Tullio	Daniele to nominate	Mara; Tullio	Dominique; Sarah	Daniele; Marco	Sarah; George	Alessia; Alberto	Alessia; Mauro	Nominated	Mauro; Alessia	Gianluca; Mauro	Mauro; Mara	Mauro	Evicted (Day 120)			
Veronica	Not in House	Exempt	Giorgio; Mara	Davide	Tullio; Mara	Gabriele; Tullio	Tullio; Diletta	Daniele; Mara	Marco to nominate	Marco; Mara	Giorgio; Cristina	Marco; Giorgio	George; Cristina	Mara; Massimo	Mara; Nicola	Exempt	Mauro; Carmela	Mauro; Gianluca	Mauro; Mara	Evicted (Day 120)				
Carmela	Not eligible	Daniela; Tullio	Exempt	Davide	Camila; Tullio	Mauro; Gabriele	Tullio; Giorgio	Tullio; Carmen	Daniele to nominate	Tullio; Carmen	Daniele; Sarah	Daniele; Giorgio	In Spain; House	Sarah; Daniele	Sarah; Veronica	Exempt	Veronica; Mauro	Mauro; Gianluca	Evicted (Day 113)					
Gianluca	Not in House														Exempt	Nominated	Alessia; Carmen	Cristina; Carmen	Walked (Day 113)					
Alessia	Nominated	Evicted (Day 1)										Exempt		Carmen; Maicol	Nicola; Maicol	Nominated	Carmen; Mara	Re-Evicted (Day 106)						
Nicola	Not in House											Exempt		Alessia; Daniele	Sarah; Veronica	Nominated	Evicted (Day 99)							
Massimo	Cristina	Daniela; Diletta	Sabrina; Cristina	Davide	Cristina; Camila	Mauro; Gabriele	Diletta; Marco	Cristina; Mattia	Exempt	Marco; Cristina	Dominique; Sarah	Cristina; Daniele	In Spain; House	Veronica; Daniele	Veronica; Sarah	Ejected (Day 92)								
Sarah	Not in House							Exempt	Daniele to nominate	Exempt	Giorgio; Dominique	Marco; Giorgio	George; Cristina	Carmela; Nicola	Carmela; Mara	Evicted (Day 92)								
Daniele	Not in House					Exempt		Mattia; Cristina	Nominated	Exempt	Dominique; Cristina	Cristina; Marco	Cristina; Carmen	Alessia; Massimo	Evicted (Day 85)									
George	Cristina	Daniela; Diletta	Sabrina; Cristina	Davide	Cristina; Veronica	Gabriele; Mauro	Diletta; Tullio	Carmen; Mattia	Exempt	Carmen; Giorgio	Sarah; Giorgio	Cristina; Carmen	Cristina; Sarah	Evicted (Day 78)										
Marco	Cristina	Daniela; Diletta	Camila; Sabrina	Davide	Camila; Tullio	Mauro; Gabriele	Tullio; Giorgio	Tullio; Cristina	Nominated	Tullio; Giorgio	Giorgio; Sarah	Giorgio; Cristina	Evicted (Day 71)											
Dominique	Not in House							Exempt	Daniele to nominate	Exempt	Daniele; Giorgio	Evicted (Day 64)												
Tullio	Cristina	Mara; Daniela	Sabrina; Cristina	Nominated	Veronica; Cristina	Marco; Gabriele	Marco; Diletta	Cristina; Daniele	Exempt	Marco; Cristina	Evicted (Day 57)													
Mattia	Not in House					Exempt		Daniele; Cristina	Evicted (Day 50)															
Diletta	Not eligible	Daniela; Mara	Cristina; Giorgio	Tullio to save	Cristina; Giorgio	Massimo; Mauro	Marco; Giorgio	Evicted (Day 43)																
Gabriele	Not in House	Exempt	Sabrina; Mara	Giorgio	Veronica; Mara	George; Massimo	Evicted (Day 36)																	
Camila	Not eligible	Daniela; Tullio	Sabrina; Cristina	Giorgio	Giorgio; Cristina	Evicted (Day 29)																		
Davide	Cristina	Daniela; Carmela	Sabrina; Cristina	Nominated	Evicted (Day 22)																			
Sabrina	Not eligible	Daniela; Mara	Mara; Davide	Evicted (Day 22)																				
Daniela	Not eligible	Mara; Carmela	Evicted (Day 15)																					
Notes	^{1}	^{2}, ^{3}, ^{4}	^{5}, ^{6}, ^{7}	^{8}	^{9}, ^{10}	^{11}	^{12}, ^{13}	^{14}, ^{15}	^{16}	^{17}	^{18}	^{19}	^{20}	^{21}	^{22}	^{23}, ^{24}	none			^{25}	none	^{26}	none	
Nominated	Davide; Veronica	Carmela; Daniela; Veronica	Sabrina; Veronica	Davide; Veronica	Camila; Cristina; Veronica	Gabriele; Veronica	Diletta; Giorgio; Marco; Veronica	Cristina; Daniele; Mattia; Veronica	Daniele; Veronica	Marco; Tullio; Veronica	Daniele; Dominique; Giorgio; Veronica	Giorgio; Marco; Veronica	Cristina; Daniele; George; Veronica	Daniele; Veronica	Sarah; Veronica	Gianluca; Nicola; Veronica	Alessia; Veronica	Carmela; Carmen; Cristina; Gianluca; Mara; Mauro; Veronica	Mauro; Veronica	Carmen; Mauro	Alberto; Cristina; Maicol; Mauro	Giorgio; ~~Mauro~~	Alberto; Cristina; Giorgio; Mauro	
Nominated	Alessia; Cristina	Carmela; Daniela; Veronica	Sabrina; Veronica	Davide; Veronica	Camila; Cristina; Veronica	Gabriele; Veronica	Diletta; Giorgio; Marco; Veronica	Cristina; Daniele; Mattia; Veronica	Daniele; Veronica	Marco; Tullio; Veronica	Daniele; Dominique; Giorgio; Veronica	Giorgio; Marco; Veronica	Cristina; Daniele; George; Veronica	Daniele; Veronica	Sarah; Veronica	Gianluca; Nicola; Veronica	Alessia; Veronica	Carmela; Carmen; Cristina; Gianluca; Mara; Mauro; Veronica	Mauro; Veronica	Carmen; Mauro	Alberto; Cristina; Maicol; Mauro	~~Cristina~~; Mara	Alberto; Cristina; Giorgio; Mauro	
Nominated	Alessia; Cristina	Carmela; Daniela; Veronica	Sabrina; Veronica	Davide; Veronica	Camila; Cristina; Veronica	Gabriele; Veronica	Diletta; Giorgio; Marco; Veronica	Cristina; Daniele; Mattia; Veronica	Daniele; Veronica	Marco; Tullio; Veronica	Daniele; Dominique; Giorgio; Veronica	Giorgio; Marco; Veronica	Cristina; Daniele; George; Veronica	Daniele; Veronica	Sarah; Veronica	Gianluca; Nicola; Veronica	Alessia; Veronica	Carmela; Carmen; Cristina; Gianluca; Mara; Mauro; Veronica	Mauro; Veronica	Carmen; Mauro	Alberto; Cristina; Maicol; Mauro	Giorgio; Mara	Alberto; Cristina; Giorgio; Mauro	
Walked																		Gianluca						
Ejected															Massimo									
Evicted	Luca; Fewest votes to enter	Daniela; 59% to evict	Sabrina; 55% to evict	Davide; 8 of 13 votes to evict	Camila; 49% to evict	Gabriele; 53% to evict	Diletta; 34% to evict	Mattia; 33% to evict	Daniele ?% to save	Tullio; 47% to evict	Dominique; 45% to evict	Marco; 52% to evict	George; 59% to evict	Daniele; 51% to evict	Sarah; 51% to evict	Nicola; 47% to evict	Alessia; 69% to evict	Carmela; 58% to evict	Veronica; 51% to evict	Carmen; 81% to evict	Maicol; 33% to evict	Mara; 40% to save	Alberto; 3% (out of 4)	Cristina; 5% (out of 3)
Evicted	Alessia; 0 of 8 votes to save	Daniela; 59% to evict	Sabrina; 55% to evict	Davide; 8 of 13 votes to evict	Camila; 49% to evict	Gabriele; 53% to evict	Diletta; 34% to evict	Mattia; 33% to evict	Daniele ?% to save	Tullio; 47% to evict	Dominique; 45% to evict	Marco; 52% to evict	George; 59% to evict	Daniele; 51% to evict	Sarah; 51% to evict	Nicola; 47% to evict	Alessia; 69% to evict	Carmela; 58% to evict	Veronica; 51% to evict	Carmen; 81% to evict	Maicol; 33% to evict	Mara; 40% to save	Giorgio; 20% (out of 2)	Mauro; 80% to win

=== Notes ===
- ^1 On launch night there was an uneven number of housemates to enter the house, as a result of this Big brother nominated Alessia and Cristina for eviction immediately. It was up to the male housemates to vote for which they wanted to stay.
- ^2 Starting on launch night the public was asked to vote for the housemates they wanted to save from the first round of nominations. Carmela, Daniela, Diletta, Mara, and Tullio received the fewest votes and were the only housemates eligible to be nominated for eviction.
- ^3 As Maicol received the most save votes in the public vote, he was given the power to save one person from eviction instead of nominating.
- ^4 As new housemates, Gabriele, Mauro and Veronica were automatically immune from eviction.
- ^5 Following last week's eviction, the public was asked to vote for the housemates they wanted to save from the second round of nominations. Camila, Cristina, Davide, Giorgio, Mara, and Sabrina received the fewest votes and were the only housemates eligible to be nominated for eviction.
- ^6 As Alberto received the most save votes in the public vote, he was given the power to save two people from eviction instead of nominating.
- ^7 As Carmela and Maicol received the second and third most save votes in the public vote, they were banned from nominating.
- ^8 Davide, Giorgio and Tullio were automatically nominated for eviction by the producers. The producers then chose Diletta to be allowed to save one of the nominees and she chose to save Tullio.
- ^9 Following last week's eviction, the public was asked to vote for the housemates they wanted to save from the third round of nominations. Camila, Cristina, Giorgio, Mara, Tullio and Veronica received the fewest votes and were the only housemates eligible to be nominated for eviction.
- ^10 As Alberto, Maicol, and Mauro received the most votes to save they were not eligible to nominate.
- ^11 Due to the disproportionate ratio of male to female housemates, all the female housemates were given immunity in round six of nominations.
- ^12 Following last week's eviction, the public was asked to vote for the housemates they wanted to save from the seventh round of nominations. Diletta, Giorgio, Mara, Marco, and Tullio received the fewest votes and were the only housemates eligible to be nominated for eviction.
- ^13 In round seven, the three housemates who received the most nominations would be up for eviction as opposed to the regular two.
- ^14 Following the last eviction, the public was asked to vote for the housemates they wanted to save from the seventh round of nominations. Carmen, Cristina, Daniele, Mara, Mattia and Tullio received the fewest votes and were the only housemates eligible to be nominated for eviction.
- ^15 In round eight, immune housemates had to nominate one male and one female housemate who was not immune.
- ^16 In round nine, the female housemates had to each save one male housemate from possible eviction. Daniele and Marco were the last two male housemates not to be saved which led to a second round of voting by the female housemates, this time to evict. Daniele was evicted but in fact, the public had to vote to either save or evict them.
- ^17 Following the last eviction, the public was asked to vote for the housemates they wanted to save from the tenth round of nominations. Carmen, Cristina, Daniele, Giorgio, Mara, Marco and Tullio received the fewest votes and were the only housemates eligible to be nominated for eviction.
- ^18 Following the last eviction, the public was asked to vote for the housemates they wanted to save from the eleventh round of nominations. Carmen, Cristina, Dominique, Giorgio, and Sarah received the fewest votes and were the only housemates eligible to be nominated for eviction.
- ^19 Following the last eviction, the public was asked to vote for the housemates they wanted to save from the twelfth round of nominations. Carmen, Cristina, Daniele, Giorgio, and Marco received the fewest votes and were the only housemates eligible to be nominated for eviction.
- ^20 On January 2, 2010, Grande Fratello announced that Alessia and Nicola would be immune from the thirteenth round of nominations. Carmela and Massimo are immune as they are taking part in the Housemate Exchange.
- ^21For the fourteenth round of nominations, housemates had to nominate one female and one male housemate. Mauro was given an exemption following a public vote.
- ^22For the fifteenth round of nominations, the public voted for their favorite housemate to gain immunity; Mauro won the vote but the housemates were not told of this. Mauro is immune and earned the right to remove a housemate nominated for eviction. Alessia, Sarah, and Veronica received the most nominations, but Mauro decided to save Alessia leaving Sarah and Veronica to face the public vote.
- ^23Following Sarah's eviction on Week 13, the sixteenth round of nominations for Week 14 did not take place due to Massimo's ejection that same night. Nominations will presume next week on Week 14 for Week 15.
- ^24The public voted for their favourite Housemates. The six housemates with the most votes were immune from the next eviction. Alberto, Carmela, Giorgio, Maicol, Mauro and Veronica received the most public votes and gained immunity. Alberto, Maicol and Mauro were the top three in the public vote and could each save a housemate from being nominated.
- ^25For the twentieth round of nominations, the male housemates each had to nominate one female housemate while the female housemates each had to nominate one male housemate.
- ^26The Housemates voted for who they wanted to save. Alberto received the most votes and is through to the final. Next, the public voted for who they wanted to save. The male and the female Housemates with the most votes will be saved. Mauro and Cristina received the most votes and are through to the final. Giorgio and Mara are up for eviction.
