= Big Brother (German TV series) season 9 =

Big Brother
- Season 9
- Presented by: Miriam Pielhau
- No. of days: 211
- No. of housemates: 30
- Winner: Daniel Schöller
- Runner-up: Marcel Schiefelbein
- No. of episodes: 211

Release
- Original network: RTL Zwei
- Original release: 8 December 2008 – 6 July 2009

Season chronology
- ← Previous; Season 8 Next → Season 10

The ninth season of Big Brother Germany began on 8 December 2008 and ended on 6 July 2009 for a total of 211 days. This season was hosted by Miriam Pielhau and Alida-Nadine Lauenstein. The theme for this season's house was Heaven and Hell. Andy, Beni, Cathy, Daniel, Geraldine, and Madeleine entered on launch night with 24 other housemates entering throughout the season.

== Big Brother Reloaded ==
From Day 36 (12 January 2009) onwards, the concept of this season was changed due to bad ratings. There was one main living area, "Heaven", where all housemates lived. "Hell" was only used as living area for punished or nominated housemates. Because of the structural changes of the interior, alteration that were done on Day 34 and 35 forced the housemates to live in the 2 rooms used for matches. On Day 43, 3 former housemates re-entered the house, Sascha Sirtl (season 5 winner), Andreas "Knubbel" Büttgenbach (5th place in season 7), and Marcel Schiefelbein (season 8 runner-up). They were eligible to win the 250,000 € prize.

== Housemates ==
Name	Age on entry	Hometown	Occupation	Day entered	Day exited	Result
Daniel Schöller	31	Cologne	Surfing teacher	1	211	Winner
Marcel Schiefelbein	24	Köthen	Chef	43	211	Runner-up
Geraldine Walther	20	Wilnsdorf		1	211	3rd Place
Benjamin "Beni" Ringler	20	Bechhofen	Baker	1	211	4th Place
Diana Schneider	26	Barcelona, Spain	Singer	134	211	5th Place
Alexandra "Alex" Albert	21	Aschaffenburg	Retail saleswoman	85	204	Evicted
Sascha Schwan	32	Berlin	Insurance salesman	8	204	Evicted
Orhan Öztürk	20	Hamburg	Chef	3	190	Evicted
Nadine Sommerfeld	26	Köthen	Dentist's assistant	155	183	Evicted
Anna Brüser	29	Hamburg		162	176	Evicted
Patricia Blanco	37	Unterhaching	Singer	106	169	Evicted
Sascha Sirtl	31	Cologne	Model	43	162	Evicted
Claudy Martin	28	Wasserburg	Hairdresser	106	148	Evicted
Claudine Rauchfuß	23	Nuremberg	Chef	106	134	Evicted
Annina Ucatis	30	Cologne	Porn actress	36	120	Evicted
Bettina "Bettie" Guderle	31	Berlin	Model	92	113	Walked
Piero Esteriore	31	Laufen, Switzerland	Singer	99	107	Walked
Jana Wagenhuber	31	Hamburg	Actress	8	106	Evicted
Sascha "McFly" Brungs	28	Cologne	Bouncer	78	93	Ejected
Madeleine Steinert	24	Bebra	Student	1	92	Evicted
Sonja Nowakowski	36	Moers		50	78	Evicted
Andreas "Knubbel" Büttgenbach	47	Bonn	Courier	43	78	Evicted
Claudia Hilgers	22	Dortmund	Call center agent	36	71	Evicted
Andreas "Andy" Steinle	25	Ehrenkirchen		1	57	Evicted
Catherine "Cathy" Agyemang	21	Hamburg	Cleaner	1	43	Evicted
Oliver Müller	21	Hagen		17	43	Evicted
Delia Karsten	22	Bremen	Unemployed	8	36	Evicted
Marco "Eisi" Eismann	23	Erdmannshausen	Industrial mechanic	8	29	Evicted
Desiree "Desi" Bundschuh	29	Edenkoden	Nurse	17	29	Evicted
Daniela "Danny" Schloms	19	Cologne	Student	3	22	Evicted

== Nominations table ==
	Week 3	Week 4	Week 5	Week 6		Week 8	Week 10	Week 11	Week 13	Week 15	Week 17	Week 19	Week 21	Week 23	Week 24	Week 25	Week 26	Week 27	Week 29		Week 30 Final	
Daniel	Danny	Delia	Delia; Jana	Not eligible	Nominated	Sascha S.	Claudia	Exempt	Annina	Sascha S.	Bettie; Orhan	Claudy; Patricia	Not eligible	Sascha S. Orhan	Exempt	Anna	Exempt	Orhan	Lost; Task	Alex	Winner (Day 211)	
Marcel	Not in House					Beni	Beni	Nominated	Jana	Sascha S.	Bettie; Annina	Claudy; Alex	Not eligible	Beni; Daniel	Exempt	Anna	Exempt	Alex	Lost; Task	Alex	Runner-up (Day 211)	
Geraldine	Danny	Delia	Not eligible	Not eligible	Madeleine	Annina	Knubbel	Nominated	Madeleine	Marcel	Bettie; Orhan	Patricia; Claudy	Patricia	Orhan; Beni	Nominated	Anna	Exempt	Orhan	Won; Task	Alex	Third place (Day 211)	
Beni	Madeleine	Delia	Not eligible	Not eligible	Oliver	Sascha S.	Sascha S.	Exempt	Madeleine	Sascha	Bettie; Marcel	Claudy; Patricia	Not eligible	Sascha S. Marcel	Exempt	Anna	Exempt	Diana	Finalist	Marcel	Fourth place (Day 211)	
Diana	Not in House												Not eligible	Beni; Sascha S.	Nominated	Anna	Nominated	Alex	Won; Task	Alex	Fifth place (Day 211)	
Alex	Not in House									Orhan	Bettie; Marcel	Patricia; Claudy	Not eligible	Sascha S. Marcel	Nominated	Anna	Exempt	Diana	Won; Task	Diana	Evicted (Day 204)	
Sascha	Danny	Delia	Not eligible	Not eligible	Nominated	Claudia	Claudia	Nominated	Jana	Orhan	Bettie; Beni	Claudy; Claudine	Not eligible	Sascha S. Beni	Exempt	Anna	Nominated	Diana	Lost; Task	Diana	Evicted (Day 204)	
Orhan	Danny	Jana	Not eligible	Not eligible	Oliver	Geraldine	Claudia	Nominated	Jana	Sascha	Bettie; Annina	Claudy; Claudine	Not eligible	Daniel; Beni	Exempt	Anna	Nominated	Geraldine	Evicted (Day 190)			
Nadine	Not in House														Exempt	Anna	Nominated	Evicted (Day 183)				
Anna	Not in House														Exempt	Nadine	Diana	Evicted (Day 176)				
Patricia	Not in House										Daniel; Sascha	Alex; Geraldine	Not eligible	Marcel; Sascha	Nominated	Evicted (Day 169)						
Sascha S.	Not in House					Beni	Claudia	Nominated	Jana	Marcel	Bettie; Annina	Claudy; Alex	Beni	Beni; Daniel	Evicted (Day 162)							
Claudy	Not in House										Bettie; Beni	Sascha; Marcel	Not eligible	Evicted (Day 148)								
Claudine	Not in House										Alex; Orhan	Sascha; Daniel	Evicted (Day 134)									
Annina	Not in House			Not eligible	Exempt	Madeleine	Geraldine	Nominated	Sascha S.	Sascha	Bettie; Marcel	Evicted (Day 120)										
Bettie	Not in House									Annina	Daniel	Walked (Day 113)										
Piero	Not in House										Walked (Day 107)											
Jana	Danny	Andy	Not eligible	Not eligible	Beni	Sascha S.	Sascha S.	Exempt	Sascha S.	Geraldine	Evicted (Day 106)											
McFly	Not in House								Jana	Ejected (Day 93)												
Madeleine	Danny	Eisi	Not eligible	Not eligible	Andy	Knubbel	Knubbel	Exempt	Geraldine	Evicted (Day 92)												
Sonja	Not in House						Annina	Nominated	Evicted (Day 78)													
Knubbel	Not in House					Madeleine	Sonja	Nominated	Evicted (Day 78)													
Claudia	Not in House			Not eligible	Exempt	Sascha	Sascha	Evicted (Day 71)														
Andy	Danny	Delia	Not eligible	Not eligible	Jana	Madeleine	Evicted (Day 57)															
Cathy	Danny	Delia	Not eligible	Not eligible	Nominated	Evicted (Day 43)																
Oliver	Not in House	Eisi	Not eligible	Not eligible	Beni	Evicted (Day 43)																
Delia	Danny	Eisi	Not eligible	Evicted (Day 36)																		
Eisi	Danny	Delia	Evicted (Day 29)																			
Desi	Not in House	Nominated	Evicted (Day 29)																			
Danny	Beni	Evicted (Day 22)																				
Notes	1	2	3	4	5	6	7	8	9	10	11	12	13	14	15	16	17	18	19	20	none	
Up for eviction	Danny; Madeleine	Andy; Beni; Cathy; Daniel; Delia; Eisi; Geraldine; Jana; Madeleine; Orhan; Sascha	Delia; Jana	Cathy; Daniel; Sascha	Beni; Oliver	Andy; Annina; Beni; Madeleine	Claudia; Knubbel; Sascha; Sascha S.	Annina; Geraldine; Knubbel; Marcel; Orhan; Sascha S. Sascha; Sonja	Annina; Jana; Madeleine; Sascha S.	Alex; Beni; Daniel; Jana	Alex; Annina; Daniel; Geraldine	Alex; Claudine; Claudy; Patricia	Beni; Claudy; Patricia; Sascha	Beni; Daniel; Marcel; Sascha S.	Alex; Diana; Geraldine; Patricia	Anna; Nadine; Orhan; Sascha	Diana; Nadine; Orhan; Sascha	Alex; Diana; Orhan	Daniel; Marcel; Sascha	Alex; Daniel; Diana; Geraldine; Marcel	Beni; Daniel; Diana; Geraldine; Marcel	
Up for eviction	Danny; Madeleine	Desi; Oliver	Delia; Jana	Cathy; Daniel; Sascha	Beni; Oliver	Andy; Annina; Beni; Madeleine	Claudia; Knubbel; Sascha; Sascha S.	Annina; Geraldine; Knubbel; Marcel; Orhan; Sascha S. Sascha; Sonja	Annina; Jana; Madeleine; Sascha S.	Alex; Beni; Daniel; Jana	Alex; Annina; Daniel; Geraldine	Alex; Claudine; Claudy; Patricia	Beni; Claudy; Patricia; Sascha	Beni; Daniel; Marcel; Sascha S.	Alex; Diana; Geraldine; Patricia	Anna; Nadine; Orhan; Sascha	Diana; Nadine; Orhan; Sascha	Alex; Diana; Orhan	Daniel; Marcel; Sascha	Alex; Daniel; Diana; Geraldine; Marcel	Beni; Daniel; Diana; Geraldine; Marcel	
Walked	none										Piero; Bettie	none										
Ejected	none									McFly	none											
Evicted	Danny; 56.9% to evict	Eisi; 3 votes to evict	Delia; 82.4% to evict	Cathy; 54.9% to evict	Oliver; 81.0% to evict	Andy; 66.0% to evict	Claudia; 80.4% to evict	Knubbel; 80.9% to evict	Madeleine; 67.8% to evict	Jana; 61.1% to evict	Annina; 42.4% to evict	Claudine; 91.9% to evict	Claudy; 69.7% to evict	Sascha S. 47.5% to evict	Patricia; 60.0% to evict	Anna; 85.3% to evict	Nadine; 72.5% to evict	Orhan; 82.6% to evict	Sascha; 55.9% to evict	Alex; 4 of 7 votes to evict	Diana; 1.8% (out of 5)	Beni; 13.8% (out of 5)
Evicted	Danny; 56.9% to evict	Eisi; 3 votes to evict	Delia; 82.4% to evict	Cathy; 54.9% to evict	Oliver; 81.0% to evict	Andy; 66.0% to evict	Claudia; 80.4% to evict	Knubbel; 80.9% to evict	Madeleine; 67.8% to evict	Jana; 61.1% to evict	Annina; 42.4% to evict	Claudine; 91.9% to evict	Claudy; 69.7% to evict	Sascha S. 47.5% to evict	Patricia; 60.0% to evict	Anna; 85.3% to evict	Nadine; 72.5% to evict	Orhan; 82.6% to evict	Sascha; 55.9% to evict	Alex; 4 of 7 votes to evict	Geraldine; 28.2% (out of 3)	Marcel; 45.0% (out of 2)
Evicted	Danny; 56.9% to evict	Desi; 67.9% to evict	Delia; 82.4% to evict	Cathy; 54.9% to evict	Oliver; 81.0% to evict	Andy; 66.0% to evict	Claudia; 80.4% to evict	Sonja; 66.0% to evict	Madeleine; 67.8% to evict	Jana; 61.1% to evict	Annina; 42.4% to evict	Claudine; 91.9% to evict	Claudy; 69.7% to evict	Sascha S. 47.5% to evict	Patricia; 60.0% to evict	Anna; 85.3% to evict	Nadine; 72.5% to evict	Orhan; 82.6% to evict	Sascha; 55.9% to evict	Alex; 4 of 7 votes to evict	Daniel; 55.0% to win	

Housemates current living on the hell side of the house.
Housemates current living on the heaven side of the house.

=== Notes ===
- ^1 Only the housemates on the hell side of the house could be nominated. As new housemates, Eisi and Jana were immune from getting nominated. The audience saved Beni from being up for eviction.
- ^2 There were two separate evictions on day 29, one for the housemates who entered in the first eight days, which was decided by a housemate vote. Delia had the most votes but was saved by the audience, resulting in Eisi's eviction (because he had the second-highest number of votes). The other eviction was for Desi and Oliver, who entered the house on Christmas Eve, which should have been decided by the heavenly housemates, but the initial vote resulted in a tie. Therefore, the public had to evict one of them.
- ^3 Eisi, who was evicted in the last eviction, had to choose one person to nominate two people for eviction as "revenge" for his eviction. He chose Daniel.
- ^4 Delia, who was evicted on Day 36, had to choose three housemates to be automatically up for eviction. She chose Daniel, Cathy, and Sascha.
- ^5 The seven housemates not nominated for eviction in round four had to choose one housemate who they wanted to be evicted. Beni and Oliver both received two votes so the public had to decide between the two of them who they wanted to evict.
- ^6 All housemates have to nominate as normal. The three or more housemates with the most votes are up for eviction. The public could choose one housemate to be immune to eviction. They chose Sascha S. Sascha S. had to choose one of the housemates, who received one nomination vote, to replace him. He chose Annina. Andy came up for eviction due to persistent rule-breaking.
- ^7 All housemates have to nominate as normal. Beni, Daniel, Knubbel, Sascha, and Sascha S. were drilled by a drill instructor. The drill instructor decides who gets nominated because of weak performance. He chose Sascha.
- ^8 Housemates were asked which housemates should live in Hell for the following week. What they did not know was that all housemates living in Hell would be immune from eviction. Beni, Daniel, Jana, and Madeleine volunteered and therefore were immune from eviction. There was a surprise double eviction.
- ^9 Housemates nominated one person. Geraldine was given immunity from eviction by a public vote.
- ^10 This time housemates nominate to save. The four housemates with the fewest votes are up for eviction. As Bettie is a new housemate, she was immune from eviction.
- ^11 Housemates will nominate face to face. The four housemates with the most votes are up for eviction. As Claudine, Claudy, and Patricia are new housemates, they are immune from eviction. As they were only three housemates nominated, the public could nominate one housemate directly. They chose Geraldine. Before this vote, Sascha S. was saved from the public. Bettie left the house shortly after the nominations, housemates had to vote who should be the fourth housemate nominated. The second round of nominations is displayed in the bottom row. As Annina, Marcel, and Orhan received three votes each, Sascha S. had to decide which housemates should be up for eviction. He chose Annina.
- ^12 Housemates have to nominate two people for eviction. Sascha S. received immunity as he won a karaoke competition last week. As Claudine and Sascha received 2 nominations each, the public has to decide who of the both should be up for eviction. They chose Claudine.
- ^13 Only the most popular female, Geraldine, and male housemate, Sascha S., are eligible to nominate this week. They have to nominate a housemate of the same gender. Furthermore, these two are immune from eviction. As there have to be four housemates up for eviction, the remaining six housemates will be split into pairs for an assault course. The slowest pair will also be up for eviction.
- ^14 As there are more male than female housemates in the house, only the male housemates could be nominated this week.
- ^15 As decided by Big Brother, all-female housemates apart from Anna and Nadine were nominated.
- ^16 Housemates nominated as normal. As there were only two housemates up for eviction, the public chose Orhan and Sascha to also be up for eviction. The three non-evicted housemates remained nominated.
- ^17 Alongside Nadine, Orhan, and Sascha, Anna chose Diana to be her replacement on the nomination list.
- ^18 Housemates nominated as normal. Geraldine was saved by a public vote.
- ^19 The male housemates competed against the female housemate in a Fun Fair task. The losing team is automatically nominated.
- ^20 Every housemate chooses one person who they want to be evicted. The housemate with the most votes is evicted.
