= Big Brother (German TV series) season 10 =

Big Brother
- Season 10
- Presented by: Aleksandra Bechtel
- No. of days: 211
- No. of housemates: 32
- Winner: Timo Grätsch
- Runner-up: Marc Maurer
- No. of episodes: 220

Release
- Original network: RTL Zwei
- Original release: 11 January – 9 August 2010

Season chronology
- ← Previous; Season 9 Next → Season 11

Big Brother 2010 is the tenth season of German reality series Big Brother. The show began on 11 January 2010 and ended on 9 August 2010, having lasted 211 days. The season was originally set to end on 6 June 2010.

The winner received the €250,000 grand prize, the second place won a car, and the third place received a holiday. Alexandra Bechtel returned as the hostess, after hosting seasons 2 to 4.

The logo for this anniversary season resembled the flag of Germany itself. In advertisements it was announced that there would be 12 housemates entering on Launch Night, the highest number of housemates entering on Day 1 since season 3.

The season was won by Timo with 75.2% of the votes against Marc.

== Housemates ==
Name	Age on entry	Hometown	Occupation	Day entered	Day exited	Result
Timo Grätsch	27	Moers	Apprentice	114	211	Winner
Marc Maurer	24	Völklingen	Student & model	155	211	Runner-up
Anne Waldvogel	65	Lindlar	Painter	148	211	3rd Place
Natascha Yoon	25	Dorsten	Medical-technical assistant	155	211	4th Place
Manuela Bernauer	36	Alicante, Spain	Cruise ship animator	142	211	5th Place
Klaus Aichholzer	32	Reutlingen	Porn actor	8	204	Evicted
Jenny Renz	26	Hamburg	Hairdresser	29	197	Evicted
Robert Wessel	26	Berlin	Bank clerk	50	193	Ejected
Kristina Source	23	Troisdorf	Unemployed	1	190	Evicted
Katrin Tschapke	24	Frankfurt am Main	Student	106	183	Evicted
Daniel Greiner	20	Essen	Salesman	1	169	Evicted
René Schmidt	28	Rostock	Model	142	163	Ejected
Salina Alonso	25	Neu Isenburg	Freelance journalist	6	155	Evicted
Pietro "Pico" Bonaccio	20	Wuppertal	Unemployed	85	142	Walked
Ramona "Lilly" Raguse	25	Koblenz	Erotic model	71	141	Evicted
Aleksandra Dimanovska	25	Lüdenscheid	Legal clerk	60	127	Evicted
Meike Muttersbach	28	Weyhe	Promoter	106	121	Ejected
Uwe Schüder	22	Hamburg	Model	1	113	Evicted
Wissam Nasreddine	27	Göttingen	Bodyguard	85	105	Walked
Anne Sprungala	27	Falkensee	Call center agent	57	100	Walked
Eva Gerlach	24	Bielefeld	Student	1	99	Evicted
Jürgen Mathieu	39	Hofgeismar	Bouncer	57	85	Evicted
Jessica Schmidt	29	Kassel	Student	18	71	Evicted
Tobias Heim	29	Aschaffenburg	Engineer	3	68	Walked
Carolin "Cora" Wosnitza	20	Hamburg	Porn actress	1	13	Walked
Carolin "Cora" Wosnitza	20	Hamburg	Porn actress	15	58	Walked
Carlos Fassanelli	45	Berlin	Singer	1	57	Evicted
Iris Klein	42	Ludwigshafen	Gastronomer	1	45	Ejected
Dirk "Pluto" Tretschok	30	Cologne	Homeless street artist	1	43	Evicted
Harald Fassanelli	42	Berlin	Invalidity pensioner	1	29	Evicted
Micaela Schäfer	26	Berlin	Model	1	16	Walked
Pisei Li	18	Dresden	Model	1	16	Walked
Horst Trippel	41	Otzberg	Tattoo artist	1	2	Walked

== Housemate bios ==
=== Aleksandra ===
Aleksandra Dimanovska is a 26-year-old lawyer and notary clerk from Lüdenscheid. She was born in Germany. She entered the house on Day 60. In the house, she started a strong friendship with Maike. She gained the sympathy of the audience. She was evicted on her third exit-voting on Day 127 with 50.4% of the votes versus Lilly

=== Anne ===
Anne Sprungala is a 22-year-old Callcenter operative from Falkensee. She entered the house on Day 57 with Jürgen. On Day 100, she left the house shortly after the live-show, because of the eviction of Eva and the tactical behavior of Klaus and Aleksandra.

=== Carlos ===
Carlos Fassanelli is a 45-year-old singer from Berlin. He was born in Argentina, he is gay and married to housemate Harald. In 2008, he auditioned for the Germany's Got Talent series: Das Supertalent. He made it to the finals and placed ninth. He and Harald were the first gay couple to enter the German Big Brother house. They were also the first to enter the Rich House on Day 1. Both have been diagnosed HIV positive. He reacted very aggressively when his Harald was voted out. He was evicted on Day 57 with 80.4% of the votes against Klaus.

=== Cora ===
Carolin "Cora" Wosnitza was a 20-year-old erotic model from Hamburg. She entered the Secret House on Day 1. She had a relationship with housemate Tobias. She left the house on Day 12, because of problems with her work. On Day 15 she was voted back to the house, but after disputes with Klaus and Uwe and the eviction of her best friend Carlos, she left the house for the second time on Day 58. On 20 January 2011, Cora died in Hamburg after lying comatose for nine days caused by a failed plastic surgery to enlarge her breasts. During the operation she suffered two cardiac arrests. At first media reported she was going to have a permanent brain damage but the damage proved to be so extensive that Cora eventually died. Police investigated the clinic afterward for possible treatment errors.

=== Daniel ===
Daniel Greiner is a 20-year-old sale person in the beverage trade from Essen. He entered the Rich House on Day 1. He was responsible for a lot of jokes played on other housemates. Whilst living in the House, his girlfriend broke up with him. He then started a relationship with Kristina in the House. On Day 142, Daniel received the news that his grandmother died. After the death of his two aunts, it is the third death in Daniel's family within four months. Big Brother allowed him to go to the funeral. On Day 167, Kristina ended their relationship and he was evicted on Day 169 with 72.5% of the votes against Klaus.

=== Eva ===
Eva Gerlach is a 24-year-old student from Bielefeld. She entered the Secret House on Day 1. At 1.87 meters, she is officially the tallest female housemate who has entered the German Big Brother House. She was very popular at the audience, but finally was evicted on her second exit-voting on Day 99 with 52.6% of the votes against Klaus.

=== Harald ===
Harald Fassanelli is a 42-year-old early retirementer from Berlin. He is married to the housemate Carlos and has been diagnosed as HIV positive. He had many arguments with Iris and her best friend Klaus. In conversations with her, he responded with bitchy comments and insults causing him to lose sympathy with much of the audience. Harald was the first housemate to be evicted on Day 29 with 66.1% of the votes versus Sabrina. On 21 June 2010, whilst at Christopher Street Day in Berlin he bit 8 people.

=== Horst ===
Horst Trippel is a 41-year-old tattooist from Otzberg. He entered the Rich House on Day 1. On Day 2 he left the house, because he felt he could not talk to the housemates Harald and Carlos without thinking of their HIV status.

=== Iris ===
Iris Klein is a 42-year-old restaurateur from Ludwigshafen. She entered the Secret House on Day 1. She was very popular with the viewers. She did not get on with fellow housemates Harald. During an interview with a Harald and a psychologist the situation escalated and Harald insulted her. She gained the sympathy of the audience and was saved from eviction with 44,4% of the votes. On Day 44, Iris was placed in Big Brother jail as punishment for breaking a microphone, talking without the microphone on, and sleeping outside the designated sleeping times. That night, she left the jail area without Big Brother's permission. The next morning, Big Brother gave her the choice to return to jail, or to leave the house. She decided to leave the House on Day 45.

=== Jenny ===
Jennifer "Jenny" Renz is a 26-year-old master barber from Hamburg. She entered the House on Day 29. She always tries to settle the disputes in the house. Jenny broke her close friendship with Klaus after he attacked her and mentioned her tough childhood in front of everybody. She has also a feud with Anne who thinks that Jenny is a frustrated time bomb. She was evicted on Day 197 with 58.6% of the votes versus Oma Anne.

=== Jessica ===
Jessica Schmidt also called "the Jessinator" is a 29-year-old student from Kassel. She entered the House on Day 18. She often had arguments with Klaus. She always called him: "King of the idiots". She was evicted on Day 71 with 90.8% of the votes versus Sabrina.

=== Jürgen ===
Jürgen Mathieu is a 39-year-old bouncer from Hofgeismar. He entered the house on Day 57 with Anne. He was noted for his dispute with Aleksandra and Klaus. He was evicted on Day 85 with 71.5% of the votes versus Aleksandra.

=== Katrin ===
Katrin Sherin Tschapke is a 23-year-old student from Frankfurt am Main. She entered the house on Day 106 with Meike. She is half Iranian. Katrin is pretty unpopular with most of the housemates. She often behaved bossy and had a feud with Manuela and Anne. She is close friends with Timo. Katrin was evicted on Day 183 with 53.1% of the votes versus OmaAnne.

=== Klaus ===
Klaus Aichholzer is a 32-year-old Callboy and Porn star from Reutlingen. He entered the Secret House on Day 8. Before Big Brother, he took part in Deutschland sucht den Superstar (the German version of the Idol series) and the German version of Got Talent: Das Supertalent. He was immediately eliminated from both. There are many disputes between him and his housemates because of his tactical and embarrassing behavior but he is very popular with the audience. In the house, he started friendships with Aleksandra and Robert. He often had discussions with the South Park puppet Eric Cartman. He called him Hans. On Day 124, he wiped his bottom on Lilly's pillow, for which he had many arguments with his housemates and had to go to the jail area for one week. On Day 176, he won the Big Brother Song Contest with 69.5% of the votes with the Falco song "Egoist". He was surprisely evicted the seventh time he was up for eviction on Day 204 with 51.3% of the votes versus Manuela.

=== Kristina ===
Kristina Source is a 23-year-old former Soldier from Troisdorf who is seeking employment. She was born in Kazakhstan. She entered the Secret House on Day 1. She is the cry-baby in the house, but is still popular with the housemates. She started a relationship with Daniel in the house. But on Day 167 after weeks of arguments, she ended her relationship with him. Kristina is becoming unpopular because of her bossy behaviour and way she broke up with Daniel which shocked most of the housemates. On Day 190, Kristina was evicted on the save voting with 26.5% of the votes.

=== Lilly ===
Ramona Raguse alias: Lilly-Love is a 25-year-old erotic model from Koblenz. She entered the House on Day 72. She stripped for Robert in for two bottles of champagne. In the house, she did not get on with Aleksandra and Klaus. After Kaus wiped his bottom on her pillow, she took a dislike to him. She was evicted the second time she was up for eviction on Day 141 with 79.2% of the votes versus Klaus.

=== Manuela ===
Manuela Bernauer is a 36-year-old promoter from Alicante, Spain. She entered the House on Day 142 with René. In the house, she started a friendship with Klaus. She felt constantly attacked by Katrin. Manuela placed fifth with 3.6% of the votes against Timo, Marc, Natascha and Oma Anne.

=== Marc ===
Marc Maurer is a 24-year-old aspiring student and model from Völklingen. He entered the House on Day 155 with Natascha. They were the last housemates to enter the house in season 10. He feels annoyed by Timo. Marc placed second place in the final with 24.8% of the votes against Timo. He won a Mini Clubman worth 15000 €.

=== Meike ===
Meike Muttersbach is a 28-year-old promoter from Weyhe. She entered the House on Day 106 with Katrin. She has appearances in Mallorca, under the name "Die Brust aus Mallorca" (The chest of Mallorca) as a singer. On Day 121, Meike was ejected from Big Brother, because of her agreement with her boyfriend that she would walk from the house on Day 123.

=== Micaela ===
Micaela Schäfer is a 24-year-old model from Berlin. In 2006, she took part at Germany's Next Topmodel, where she placed eighth. She entered the Rich House on Day 1. On Day 16, she and Pisei left the house, because of the harder rules of Big Brother.

=== Natascha ===
Natascha Yoon is a 25-year-old medical technical assistant from Dorsten. She entered the house on Day 155 with Marc. They were the last housemates to enter the house in season 10. She is of mixed German and South Korean ethnicity. Natascha placed fourth with 6.9% of the votes against Timo, Marc, Manuela and Oma Anne.

=== Oma Anne ===
Annegret Waldvogel is a 65-year-old lecturer in painting from Lindlar. She entered the house on Day 149. She was the oldest person, who ever entered the German Big Brother house. She considers most of them to be fake, especially Kristina and Jenny. She is friends with Klaus and Marc and trashes most of the housemates, in particular Jenny and Manuela. Oma Anne placed third place in the final with 7.9% of the votes against Timo and Marc. She won a travel voucher worth 7000 €.

=== Pico ===
Pietro Bonaccio a 20-year-old Half-Italian and seeking employment from Wuppertal, at a height of 1.52 meters, he is the smallest male housemate who has ever entered the German Big-Brother House. On Day 142, he left the house, stating he did not recognize himself in the house.

=== Pisei ===
Pisei La is an 18-year-old model from Dresden. She was born in Cambodia. In 2009, she won the "Miss Sachsen"-Title. She entered the Secret house on Day 1. She was unpopular at the housemates, because of her bitchy behavior. She was fake evicted on Day 8 and moved to the Rich House. On Day 16, she and Micaela left the house.

=== Pluto ===
Dirk "Pluto" Tretschok is a 30-year-old street painter from Cologne. He entered the Rich House on Day 1. With his stroppy behavior, he was not popular. He was evicted on Day 43 with 70.9% of the votes against Klaus.

=== Robert ===
Robert Wessel is a 25-year-old bank clerk from Dessau. He entered the House on Day 50. In the House he started a friendship with Klaus. His friendship with Klaus has coolen down since Klaus thinks he is fake. The German Press accused Robert of racism (against Lebanese-born Wissam) and of animal torture (he told Sabrina how he once tortured a sheep with his friends after a party). After Peta had heard the story of a pregnant sheep being drugged and tortured with loud music, they suggested he should visit them and work for them one day to realize what he has done to a helpless animal. But Peta has not met him in the house. On Day 193, he was ejected from Big Brother, because of an accusation, which he got because of that stories. Although officially he had to leave the house because of a lawsuit against him, the press thinks he had to go because of some comments that have upset the viewers like the comparison of fellow housemate Klaus with Adolf Hitler or his xenophobic behaviour against Wissam. Several times, he also talked about his affection for younger girls and explicitly described his sexual preferences and adventures. Once evicted, Robert denied everything saying everything has been made up by fans of Klaus to discredit him.

=== René ===
René Schmidt alias Rene Reves is a 28-year-old model from Hamburg. He entered the House on Day 142 with Manuela. After three days in the house, he fell in love with Katrin. But unfortunately she was not in love with him. Because of Katrin's refusal, he started dispute with everyone in the house. At the nomination on Day 162 he insulted Daniel, his family and he said that he sold the story of his dead aunts and grandmother to TV to trigger compassion to the viewers. Because of this insulting and offending nomination statement he was ejected from Big Brother the same day.

=== Salina ===
Salina Alonso is a 25-year-old hairdresser and a freelance journalist from Neu Isenburg.Once a week she entertained people with her radio show Italian connection on radio Darmstadt. She entered the Rich House as a present for Daniel's Birthday on Day 5. She was born in Italy. She became very popular for their sense of humor. She had a love story with Timo which was a heartbreaking for all the misunderstandings that they create. She was in the house for 155 days.

=== Timo ===
Timo Grätsch is a 27-year-old apprentice from Moers. He entered the house on Day 113. The housemates were very surprised seeing him, because he swam in the pool. The housemates thought that he was a fan, who has broken into the house. He started a friendship with Sabrina, but after a joke against Timo from Sabrina he became mad and began to avoid her. Days later he tried again to talk to her, but she blocked. When she also nominated him, he ended the friendship with her. He is close friends with Katrin. Timo won the Final Ticket instead of Kristina and will be in the final. After Klaus Timo is the second most popular housemate to the viewers because of his brave standing against Klaus and his strategy in the house. Timo won Big Brother Germany 2010 with 75.2% of the votes against Marc. He won 250000 €.

=== Tobias ===
Tobias Heim is a 29-year-old engineering worker from Aschaffenburg. He entered the Rich House on Day 3. In the house he started a relationship with Cora. He thought that that relationship was deep, but at the live-show interview Cora said that she was not in love with him. On Day 67, Tobias wanted to leave the House to be by Cora. Big Brother showed him the interview. He was very shocked and confused when he saw that. On Day 68, he decided to leave the house. On the following live-show, he said that he is very happy without Cora.

=== Uwe ===
Uwe Schüder is a 22-year-old barkeeper and model from Hamburg. In 2009, he won the "Mr. Hamburg"-Title. He entered the Secret House on Day 1. He is very unpopular at the female housemates, because of his stroppy behavior and his bad manners. He was evicted on his third exit-voting on Day 113 with 63.1% of the votes against Klaus.

=== Wissam ===
Wissam Nasreddine is a 27-year-old Kick-Box Teacher and Bodyguard from Göttingen. He was 2008 Kickbox European Champion and footballer for Sparta Göttingen. On Day 105 he left the house after 20 Days, because he was discriminated by the other housemate Robert like he stated in an interview with a priest.

== Weekly tasks ==
Every Tuesday the Housemates got a task from Big Brother, which they had to complete until Monday. The housemates had 26 weekly tasks. They passed 18 and failed 8.

Task No.	Date given	Description	Result
1	27 January 2010 (Day 17)	The Housemates had to learn some typical facts about the opposite sex. The Females about Craft Equipment, German Football Clubs and the sexist women alive of the last 10 years. The Males about Bikinis, Movies and the sexist men alive of the last 10 years. If the housemates failed to pass, then they had to eat cabbage soup for one week.	Passed
2	2 February 2010 (Day 23)	The Housemates had to rub 600 eraser down to 95% of their weight. Just two housemates could work at the same time. They could work from 10a.m to 10p.m . If the housemates failed to pass, then they had to eat cabbage soup for one week.	Passed
3	16 February 2010 (Day 37)	The Housemates had to learn the different reflex zones of the human body and had to apply this knowledge. If the housemates failed to pass, then they had to eat cabbage soup for one week.	Passed
4	23 February 2010 (Day 44)	The Housemates had to disentangle a big Rope. Just two housemates could work at the same time. They could work from 10a.m to 10p.m. If the housemates failed to pass, then they had to eat cabbage soup for one week.	Passed
5	2 March 2010 (Day 51)	The Housemates had to write the song lyrics of the title song for BB10, "Schöne Neue Welt" (Beautiful New World) by Culcha Candela with rice grains on a blackboard. Just one housemate could work from 9am-10pm. If the housemates failed to pass, then they had to eat rice for one week.	Failed
6	9 March 2010 (Day 58)	Each of the Housemates had to solve a Rubik's Cube in an average time of three minutes or less. If the housemates failed to pass, then they had to eat broth cubes for one week.	Failed
7	16 March 2010 (Day 65)	All male housemates had to learn Pole Dancing. Every day they had one hour to learn the given choreography. Then on Monday two groups of three had to perform the choreography. Big Brother decided if the required elements were performed right or wrong. The audience could decide, if they pass or fail. If the housemates failed to pass, then they had to eat bread and water for one week.	Passed
8	23 March 2010 (Day 72)	The housemates had to create a logo with the label: "Big Brother wünscht Guten Appetit" (Big Brother wishes you bon appétit). The catch is that they had to build the logo with printed paper scraps. But first they had to search the scraps in a big bowl. If one scrap was missing, the task was failed. If the housemates failed to pass, then they had to eat cabbage soup for one week.	Failed
9	30 March 2010 (Day 79)	The housemates had to build the scenery and props for an Easter photo shoot. The main prop was a large Easter basket. Every day they had two houres to build the basket. For the other props they had time from 10a.m. to 6p.m. If the housemates failed to pass, then they had to eat food that consists of potatoes for one week.	Passed
10	6 April 2010 (Day 86)	The housemates had to knit a 120 meters long cord, that must not break up or be too short. A further complication was that the housemates did not get a measuring tape. So they had to consider the 120 meters themselves. Each housemate only knitted with one color. If a housemate has used up his wool, then he had to wait until all the other housemates used their wool. Then he got new wool. If the housemates failed to pass, then they had to eat food that consists of potatoes for one week.	Passed
11	13 April 2010 (Day 93)	The housemates got 780 candles with 22 mm diameter into the house. They had to make them soft with their body heat only. Then they get 4 stencils. Pro Stencil 195 candles had to fit through it. The difficulty levels range from perpendicular (light), on horseshoe shape (medium), to wave form (hard). Only 39 candles may break. The housemates could work every day from 12a.m. until 10p.m at the week task. All housemates could work simultaneously. If the housemates failed to pass, then they had to eat food that consists of potatoes for one week.	Passed
12	20 April 2010 (Day 100)	The housemates had to allocate 40 barcodes to the food Big Brother gave them. In addition, the task is complicated by the fact that the barcodes could be compared only with the food, while the showroom is open. All other products were compared 24 hours. If this part was successfully, the housemates had to learn the codes by heart. If the housemates failed to pass, then they had to eat food that consists of potatoes for one week.	Passed
13	27 April 2010 (Day 107)	The Housemates had to sew twelve pillow covers and two blankets, paint twelve pots, bring the garden into shape, build a greenhouse and plant them and make three designs for wall tattoos. The latter should already be ready Thursday night. They could work simultaneously from 10a.m until 8p.m with up to six people. Then the audience could decide, if the housemates fail or pass the task. If the housemates failed to pass, then they had to eat food that consists of potatoes for one week.	Failed
14	4 May 2010 (Day 114)	The Housemates had to travel 1886 km on an exercise bike. Starting from the Big Brother house the housemates cycled to Mainz, Munich, Erfurt, Hannover, Bielefeld, Duisburg. The finish was the Big Brother house in Cologne. The housemates could follow the virtual route on a monitor. For each milestone the housemates reached, they get out of each city, a regional delicacy. If the hosuemates failed to pass, then they had to eat dairy products for one week.	Passed
15	12 May 2010 (Day 122)	The housemates had to solve tricky tasks. There were 60 worksheets in the size of DIN A 4. The sheets contained tasks with numbers, words, color swatches and geometric shapes. On each sheet was a task. The housemates had to write the answers on a blackboard in the living area. The solutions were announced in the live-show. If the housemates made too many mistakes, then they had to eat dairy products for one week.	Failed
16	18 May 2010 (Day 128)	The housemates had to learn a traditional bavarian dance. The Schuhplattler. Three male and three female housemates had to learn it. The six chosen were: Sabrina, Jenny, Katrin, Pico, Robert and Daniel. The audience then decided, if they pass or fail. If the housemates failed, then they had to eat noodles for one week.	Failed
17	25 May 2010 (Day 135)	The housemates had to fold 2500 paper airplanes in various designs. The housemates could work from 12a.m to 12p.m. Two housemates could work at the same time. If the housemates failed, then they had to eat cabbage soup for one week.	Passed
18	1 June 2010 (Day 142)	The housemates had to transport 150 liters water from an aquarium 15 metres to a second empty aquarium with straws. If the housemates failed, then they had to eat cabbage soup for one week.	Passed
19	8 June 2010 (Day 149)	The housemates had to sew a Germany flag for the Fifa World Cup 2010, which consists of 135 individual parts. Just three housemates could work at the same time. The flag needed to be sewn until Sunday 2:00 p.m. If the housemates failed, then they had to eat cabbage soup for one week.	Passed
20	15 June 2010 (Day 156)	On the entire week, Big Brother showed the housemates videos of rabbits. The housemates had to count them. Everytime one housemate had to be near the television to watch the video. While this the housemate had to wear a rabbit costume. Then on Monday, the housemates had to tell Big Brother the right number of rabbits. If the housemates failed, then they had to eat cabbage soup for one week.	Failed
21	22 June 2010 (Day 163)	The housemates had to learn 60 cocktail recipes. Then they had to be able to make the cocktails. If the housemates failed, they had to eat grains for one week.	Failed
22	29 June 2010 (Day 170)	The housemates had to make bodypaintings on the other housemates's bodies. They have to drew the flags of the participating countries of the FIFA World Cup 2010. Four housemates could work at the same time. The housemates could work from 12 a.m. to 8 p.m. If the housemates failed, they had to eat potatoes for one week.	Passed
23	6 July 2010 (Day 177)	The housemates had to prevent that the 2 minute countdown of two chess clocks falls to zero. If the countdown of one clock fell to zero, the housemates got an error. The number of errors the housemates may do, was announced by Big Brother at the end of the week task. The clocks had some distance from each other. So, the housemates had to reset the countdown of the first clock and then they had to run to the second clock and reset its countdown, etc. At irregular intervals, a number appeared on the clock and an alarm signal sounds. The number showed the number of housemates, who have to reset the clocks together and for so long until the number disappears. The housemates had to reset the clocks from 12a.m to 12p.m. If the housemates failed, they had to eat potatoes for one week.	Passed
24	13 July 2010 (Day 184)	The housemates had to recognize 50 rock-songs by just hearing their guitar solos. Title and artist of the song had to be named. If the housemates failed, they had to eat potatoes for one week.	Passed
25	20 July 2010 (Day 191)	The housemates had to learn a trick. The housemates could learn the tricks from 10 a.m. to 10 p.m. and the housemates must decide which trick each housemate has to learn until Thursday 6 p.m. The tricks were presented at the live-show on Monday. A trick had to be performed within one minute. In an envelope was the number of mistakes the housemates can do. It was opened after the tricks were presented. If the housemates made more mistakes than allowed, they had to eat dairy products for one week. The eight tricks are: 1. 20 coins have 6 of them must land in a cup. (done by Jenny) ✓; 2. 4 golf balls must be stacked. (done by Timo) ✗; 3. Doses towers stacked in a pyramid, while 10 must cans next to each other. (done by Klaus) ✓; 4. 15 full bottles of water are available on labels, the labels need to move away. Of which must be 12 bottles remain. (done by Natascha) ✓; 5. Three springs must be kept in the air by blowing about 1 minute. (not done, because of Robert's Ejection); 6. A shirt must be pulled out and dressed again 20 times. (done by Manuela) ✓; 7. Three chocolate buttons are located on three straws, on that long strings are attached. These must be placed over the ears. The chocolate buttons must be lifted to the mouth. (done by Oma Anne) ✓; 8. A cup is attached with a rubber band on the head, three table tennis balls must land in the cup. (done by Marc) ✓; The housemates were allowed to make two mistakes.	Passed
26	27 July 2010 (Day 198)	The housemates had to organize a stunt show and perform the stunts by themselves. If the housemates passed, they win all objects from the treasure chest.	Passed

== Whitebox challenge ==
Once or twice a week one of the housemates has to participate at a Whitebox Challenge, where he can win prizes for the team (e.g. beds or more Cooking-Time) or lose them (The Couch or he has to choose one housemate, who gets a cigarette or cosmetics ban for one day).

Task No.	Date given	Contestant	Description	Result	Price or Penalty
1	31 January 2010 (Day 21)	Eva	She had to stand in the top left-hand corner of the Box. Then a green point appeared for 10 seconds. After that she had to put a cube on the place where the point was. If the place was right, she won the round. For every round she wins, two beds were unlocked.	Passed; 1 of 3 rounds won	2 beds were unlocked
2	1 February 2010 (Day 22)	Klaus	He had to collect 20 red balls on the floor and put them in a container in 30 seconds at the Round 1, 20 seconds in Round 2 and 10 seconds in Round 3. For every failed round he had to nominate one housemate, who has to go to the panel area.	Failed; 2 of 3 rounds won	Klaus had to go to the panel area
3	3 February 2010 (Day 24)	Pluto	He had to remember a color and tone sequence. Each tone is assigned a color. For every round he loses, the cooking-time is reduced half an hour.	Failed; 0 of 3 rounds won	Cooking-time is cut to half an hour
4	5 February 2010 (Day 26)	Daniel	He had to balance a small ball on a flat tablet and depart red cubes on the floor. If the ball is falling down, he had to start again. Every round he had three chances to pass. For every round he wins, the housemates get 15 minutes more cooking-time.	Passed; 3 of 3 rounds won	Cooking-time increases to 75 minutes
5	8 February 2010 (Day 29)	Harald	He had to snip balls from a podium to a box. For every failed round, he had to nominate one smoker, who got a cigarette ban for one day.	Failed; 0 of 3 rounds won	Iris, Sabrina and Jessica got a cigarette ban for one day.
6	8 February 2010 (Day 29)	Salina	See Whitebox Task 5 Only difference: Sabrina had to nominate one female housemate, who got a cosmetics ban for one day.	Failed; 0 of 3 rounds won	Iris, Eva and Kristina got a cosmetics ban for one day
7	11 February 2010 (Day 32)	Tobias	From the center appears a ring of blue and red squares. He had to count the squares. For every round he loses, he had to give some shower coins back to Big Brother.	Failed; 0 of 3 rounds won	He had to give all shower coins back to Big Brother
8	13 February 2010 (Day 34)	Jessica	A way of cubes appears for a short time. Then she had to walk the way again. Every Round the way gets more difficult. For every round she wins, the housemates get one chair of the Dining-Room tesk back. For every round she wins, the housemates win some chairs of the Dining-room desk back.	Passed; 3 of 3 rounds won	Jessica won the full equipment of the Dining-room desk back
9	18 February 2010 (Day 39)	Jenny	She has to throw a ball into a box. Before the ball lands in the box, the ball has to touch 4 Columns. She has only one try for each round. For every round she wins, the housemates got one third of their cosmetics back.	Passed; 1 of 3 rounds won	The housemates got one third of their cosmetics back
10	19 February 2010 (Day 40)	Iris	She had to balance a tower of cubes on a stick and had to hold it for 10 seconds. In Round 1, she had to balance 12 cubes. In Round 2 14 cubes and in Round 3 16 cubes. For every round she wins, the housemates get one minute more shower time per shower coin for hot water.	Passed; 2 of 3 rounds won	She won two minutes more time per shower coins
11	24 February 2010 (Day 45)	Carlos	He had to move colored balls to the 4 corners of a "Flower". Every colored ball has a colored corner. Every round he had to move one ball more to the right corner. For every round he won, one bed gets unlocked.	Failed; 0 of 3 rounds won	No beds got unlocked
12	26 February 2010 (Day 47)	Kristina	She had to throw balls into a case. Before they land in the case, the ball has to touch the floor. At Round 1 she has four chances, at Round 2 three chances and at Round 3 two chances. For every round she loses, she has to nominate a housemate, who has to eat canned food for one day.	Failed; 0 of 3 rounds won	Kristina, Sabrina and Klaus have to eat canned food for one day
13	4 March 2010 (Day 53)	Robert	see Whitebox Task 1 Only difference: For every round he wins, the housemates get ten minutes more breakfast-time.	Passed; 2 of 3 rounds won	The housemates get 20 minutes more breakfast-time
14	6 March 2010 (Day 55)	Kristina	She has step on 15 green flashing cubes. Every cube is flashing for four seconds. For every round she wins, the female housemates get a bubble bath. Two Rounds were played.	Passed; 2 of 2 rounds won	The female housemates won two bubble baths
15	6 March 2010 (Day 55)	Klaus	See Whitebox Task 14; Only difference: Klaus played for the men.	Passed; 2 of 2 rounds won	The male housemates won two bubble baths
16	10 March 2010 (Day 59)	Jürgen	He had to play a round of "Tic Tac Toe" against the Whitebox. The first one, who wins three rounds is the winner. If Jürgen wins, the housemates hear 30 minutes of party-music in the following evening.	Passed; Jürgen beat the Whitebox	The housemates won 30 minutes Party-music
17	12 March 2010 (Day 61)	Uwe	See Whitebox Task 2 Only difference: For every round he wins, he can nominate a housemate, who can have a 30-minute siesta.	Passed; 2 of 3 rounds won	Uwe and Salina won a 30-minute siesta
18	17 March 2010 (Day 66)	Anne	She had to play three rounds of Memory. In the following rounds she had less and less tries to win. For every round she wins, the housemates get four chairs of the Dining-room desk back.	Passed; 2 of 3 rounds won	Anne won eight chairs of the Dining-room desk back
19	19 March 2010 (Day 68)	Eva	She had to play a game of Mastermind. She had to guess a colour code within six turns. If she used more than four turns, she and another person had to crack 10 kilograms of nuts. If she used more than five turns, the two persons had to crack 20 kilograms of nuts. If she did not pass in the sixth turn, then she had to crack 30 kilogram of nuts.	Failed; Eva needed six turns to solve correctly	Eva & Jessica had to crack 20 kilograms of nuts
20	25 March 2010 (Day 74)	Daniel	He had to play the match: "Alley". He had to remember ways and go them blind. In Round 1 the way is 30 cm wide, in Round 2 25 cm wide and in Round 3 20 cm wide. For every round he wins, he could choose one male housemate, who could win a free haircut.	Passed; 1 of 3 rounds won	Daniel won a free haircut
21	26 March 2010 (Day 75)	Aleksandra	She had to balance a red ball on a Tray, while standing on a pile. For every round she had to stand ten seconds more. The round is failed when she falls off or the ball falls off the tray. For every round she loses, the breakfast-time reduces by 15 minutes.	Failed; 1 of 3 rounds won	Breakfast-time is cut to 50 minutes
22	27 March 2010 (Day 76)	Lilly	See Whitebox Task 11; Only difference: For every round she loses, she had to nominate one housemate, who stayed awake the following night.	Failed; 1 of 3 rounds won	Lilly and Jürgen had to stay awake the night
23	7 April 2010 (Day 87)	Wissam	See Whitebox Task 9 Only difference: For every round he wins, the housemates get one chair and bed.	Passed; 1 of 3 rounds won	The housemates won one chair and one bed
24	10 April 2010 (Day 90)	Pico	He had to play the game: "Stop it!". From the center of the bottom spring several color rays, which, run in different directions, to also colored squares. He has to stop the rays, by relying on each representing square and thus interrupting the run. For every round he loses, the housemates lose two minutes shower-time.	Failed; 2 of 3 rounds won	The shower-time is cut to five minutes
25	14 April 2010 (Day 94)	Jenny	See Whitebox Task 5 & 6 Only difference: For every round she wins, the housemates get garden furniture and pool toys.	Passed; 1 of 3 rounds won	The housemates won cushions for the garden furniture and pool toys
26	16 April 2010 (Day 96)	Uwe	He had to balance a seesaw with equal heavy weights. He has to keep the seesaw in balance, that none of the weights fall off. If none of the weights falls down within 20 seconds the round is won. In Round 1 one weight must be on the right and three on the left site. In Round 2 two weights must be on the left and five on the right site. In Round 3 three weights must be on the left and seven on the right site. For every round he win, the housemates get ten minutes Party-music on that evening.	Passed; 3 of 3 rounds won	The housemates won 30 minutes of Party-music
27	21 April 2010 (Day 101)	Aleksandra	She had to build a tower of cubes on the floor. In Round 1 the tower consisted of 12 cubes, in Round 2 of 14 cubes and in Round 3 of 16 cubes. For every round she lose, some beds get closed.	Failed; 0 of 3 rounds won	All beds get closed for two days
28	23 April 2010 (Day 103)	Robert	See Whitebox Task 14 & 15; Differences:Robert played three rounds and for every round he wins, the housemates get garden furniture and pool toys.	Passed; 3 of 3 rounds won	The housemates won cushions for the full garden furniture and pool toys
29	28 April 2010 (Day 108)	Meike	See Whitebox Task 16; Only difference: For every round she draws or wins, everything stays the same. For every round she loses, the housemates lose ten minutes breakfast time.	Passed; 3 of 3 rounds drawn	The breakfast time stays at 50 minutes
30	29 April 2010 (Day 109)	Katrin	She had to catch balls, which were shot out of cannon. In every Round three balls were shot. In Round 1, she had to catch one ball. In Round 2, she had to catch two balls. In Round 3, she had to catch three balls. For every round she loses, the shower time is reduced by one minute.	Passed; 3 of 3 rounds won	The shower time stays at five minutes
31	5 May 2010 (Day 115)	Timo	See Whitebox Task 3 Only difference: For every round he wins, the housemates win a bubble-bath for two persons. For every round she wins, the housemates win a bubble-bath.	Failed; 0 of 3 rounds won	The housemates get no bubble-bath
32	7 May 2010 (Day 117)	Lilly	She had to found through a maze and reach three marked points. In Round 1, she had 30 seconds to pass. In Round 2, she had 25 seconds to pass. In Round 3, she had 20 seconds to pass. For every round she wins, the housemates win a bubble-bath.	Passed; 1 of 3 rounds won	Lilly won one bubble-bath with another housemate
33	12 May 2010 (Day 122)	Robert	See Whitebox Task 19; Only Difference: If he used more than four turns, he had to nominate one housemate, who loses all letters and photos of their families. If he used more than five turns, he had to nominate two housemates. If he did not pass in the sixth turn, then he had to nominate three housemates.	Failed; Robert needed six turns to solve correctly	Robert and Timo lost all their letters and photos of their families
34	14 May 2010 (Day 124)	Kristina	See Whitebox Task 26; Only Difference: For every round she wins, she can nominate a housemate who gets a free haircut.	Passed; 2 of 3 rounds won	Kristina and Salina won a free haircut
35	19 May 2010 (Day 129)	Lilly	See Whitebox Task 21; Only Difference: For every round she wins, she wins some beauty articles.	Passed; 2 of 3 rounds won	Lilly won some beauty articles
36	21 May 2010 (Day 131)	Klaus	He had to reach the other side of the whitebox. He was not allowed to touch the floor. He could touch the green flashing fields with the two boards. He could only touch the green flashing fields while they were flashing. For every round he wins, the shower-time is reduced by one minute.	Failed; 2 of 3 rounds won	The shower-time is cut to four minutes
37	26 May 2010 (Day 136)	Salina	See Whitebox Task 18; Differences: If she used more than 10 turns, she had to nominate one housemate, who has to go to the panel area. If she used more than 12 turns, she had to nominate two housemates. And if she used more than 14 turns, she had to nominate three housemates.	Failed; Salina needed 21 turns to solve correctly	Salina, Katrin and Jenny had to go to the panel area
38	27 May 2010 (Day 137)	Daniel	See Whitebox Task 24; Only Difference: For every round he wins, he can nominate one housemate, who can leave the panel area.	Passed; 2 of 3 rounds won	Jenny and Salina can leave the panel area
39	2 June 2010 (Day 143)	René	The whitebox showed him lines that he had to memorize. Then the lines were hidden, and Rene should mark the corners of the line with dices. For every round he wins, the housemates win three packs of cigarettes.	Failed; 0 of 3 rounds won	The housemates get no new cigarettes
40	4 June 2010 (Day 145)	Manuela	See Whitebox Task 20; Only Difference: For every round she wins, the housemates get one shower coin.	Passed; 1 of 3 rounds won	The housemates get one shower coin
41	9 June 2010 (Day 150)	Oma Anne	She had to run squares in a minute, while balancing a ball on a plate. In Round 1, she had to run five squares. In Round 2, she had to run seven squares. And in Round 3, she had to run ten squares. For every round she wins, the team Katrin get some cigarettes and shower coins.	Failed; 0 of 3 rounds won	Team Katrin get no cigarettes and shower coins
42	17 June 2010 (Day 158)	Marc	He had to fix a point on a circle with a laser pointer and then go to it blind. Without fixing the point out of the circle. In Round 1, the circle was big. In Round 2, the point was smaller. And in Round 3, the circle was even more smaller. For every round he wins, the housemates get some cigarettes.	Failed; 0 of 3 rounds won	The housemates get no cigarettes
43	22 June 2010 (Day 163)	Katrin	See Whitebox Task 7 Only Difference: For every round she wins, the housemates get one packet of filter cigarettes.	Passed; 1 of 3 rounds won	The housemates get one packet of filtered cigarettes
44	30 June 2010 (Day 171)	Robert	See Whitebox Task 36; Only Difference: For every round he wins, he could play with three other housemates the Wii game Just Dance for half an hour.	Passed; 1 of 3 rounds won	Robert, Katrin, Timo and Jenny could play Just Dance for half an hour
45	7 July 2010 (Day 178)	Jenny	See Whitebox Task 14, 15 & 28; Only Difference: For every round she wins, she can nominate a housemate who gets a free haircut.	Passed; 2 of 3 rounds won	Jenny and Kristina won a free haircut
46	14 July 2010 (Day 185)	Klaus	See Whitebox Task 20; Differences: If he fails one round, all housemates lose their cosmetics. If he loses two rounds, all housemates lose their photos and letters of their families. If he loses all rounds, all housemates lose almost all their clothes.	Failed; 2 of 3 rounds won	All housemates lost their cosmetics
47	16 July 2010 (Day 187)	Oma Anne	See Whitebox Task 39; Only Difference: For every round she fails, two housemates have lose their photos and letters of their families.	Failed; 1 of 3 rounds won	Oma Anne, Jenny, Klaus and Manuela lost their photos and letters of their families
48	21 July 2010 (Day 192)	Natascha	She had to throw a ball into a tube. The ball had to touch the floor once. For every round she had one try. For every round she wins, she could choose one of the four housemates, who lost the photos and letters of his families in Whitebox Task 47. This housemate gets his photos and letters back.	Passed; 2 of 3 rounds won	Jenny and Klaus get their photos and letters of their families back
49	23 July 2010 (Day 194)	Timo	See Whitebox Task 9 Only Difference: For every round he wins, the housemates get one packet of filter cigarettes.	Passed; 1 of 3 rounds won	The housemates get one packet of filtered cigarettes
50	30 July 2010 (Day 201)	Manuela	See Whitebox Task 11; Only Difference: For every round she wins, the housemates get one portion of spaghetti ice.	Passed; 1 of 3 rounds won	The housemates get one portion of spaghetti ice

== Big Brother Song Contest ==
On Day 176, Big Brother held the Big Brother Song Contest, where each of the housemates had to sing the song they recorded for the Big Brother 10 album. As Marc and Natasha, entered the house after the recordings took place they were exempt from the task. The audience decided which of the performances was the best. The famous German party duo Die Atzen was the panel.

The winner could choose one of three prizes:

- A normal package with cigarettes, shower coins, and alcohol.
- A surprise package, which could only be shared with the winner and four other housemates.
- Whoever the winner nominated would receive two votes against them.

As the winner, Klaus chose to receive the surprise package.

Big Brother Song Contest
Draw	Housemate	Song	English Translation	Televote	Place
1	Robert	"Das geht ab"	This goes out	8.0%	3
2	Katrin	"Mädchen"	Girl	6.1%	4
3	Jenny	"Jede Zelle meines Körpers ist glücklich"	Every cell of my body is happy	2.5%	5
4	Klaus	"Egoist"	Egoist	69.5%	1
5	Timo	"Ein Kompliment"	A compliment	10.2%	2
6	Manuela	"Ab in den Süden"	Going South	0.8%	8
7	Kristina	"Ohne dich"	Without you	1.4%	7
8	Oma Anne	"Für mich soll's rote Rosen regnen"	For me, it should rain red roses	1.5%	6

== Special events ==
=== Day 2 ===
Horst left the House, because he could not talk to the housemates Harald and Carlos without thinking of their Disease HIV.

=== Day 12 ===
Cora originally left the house on Day 12 due to issues with her work, but resolved them and asked to return. Following a public vote, Cora was allowed to return to the house on Day 15.

=== Day 14 ===
On Day 14 the Housemates of the Secret House, moved to the Main House after Secret House was no longer in use.

=== Day 16 ===
After the live-show the Pisei and Micaela left the house, because of the harder rules of Big Brother.

=== Day 44–45 ===
On Day 44 Iris has to go to the penalty area, because of destroying a microphone, talking without the microphone and sleeping outside the sleeping times. In the night she left the penalty area without the permission of Big Brother. The next morning she had to make a decision: Either she would go back to the penalty area or she would get ejected from Big Brother. She decided to leave the House.

=== Day 58 ===
Cora decided to leave the house for the second time, because she did not recognize herself anymore, as well as for the dispute between the female housemates and Klaus.

=== Day 59 ===
Daniel could meet his mother in the Whitebox room, after winning the prize in the live-show.

=== Day 64 ===
The famous German drag queen Lorielle London visited the housemates as a blind-date for the winner of the live-show match: Robert. After that she spent the night in the Big Brother house.

=== Day 67–68 ===
In the evening of Day 67 Tobias announced, that he would leave the house. Because of the relationship of the former housemate Cora. In order for him to not make the wrong decision, Big Brother showed him an interview of her in the live-show. There she said that, she is not in love with him anymore. After that he has very confused. The other housemates tried to convince him to stay. But he walked the next morning.

=== Day 73 ===
The female housemates made a photoshoot at the pool for the Internet site of the Bild-Zeitung. There the users could decide, which of the housemates looks the best. The winner was Aleksandra with more than the half of the votes. She won 7 shower-coins for herself and a housemate of her choice.

=== Day 83 ===
For the first time since Season 8, the housemates were given a pet: a python named Ka, which lived in a terrarium in the living room. To keep her day-night rhythm, the first housemate up each morning had to uncover the terrarium, and the last to go to bed had to cover it again.

=== Day 87–94 ===
In this week Big Brother fooled the Housemates. Every day they played a clip showing the Ex-Housemates Tobias, Pluto, Pisei and Jessica living in the former Secret House. The Housemates were surprised and speculated as to what was going on.

=== Day 92 ===
The housemates took an IQ test. The results were made public in the live-show. The smartest housemate is Robert with 128 pts.
The housemates with the best results were:

1. Robert 128 pts.
2. Lilly 118 pts.
3. Klaus 117 pts.
4. Anne 110 pts.
5. Eva 109 pts.

=== Day 95 ===
Eva got a surprise in the Matchroom: She met her mother for five minutes.

=== Day 99 ===
The famous German sex-therapist Erika Berger visited Aleksandra and Jenny in the Matchroom. They talked about their relations with Klaus.

=== Day 100 ===
Anne left the house short after the live-show, because of the eviction of Eva and the tactical behavior of Klaus and Aleksandra.

=== Day 101 ===
Uwe was surprised by his best friend Albert. He cheered him on to stay, because he considered leaving the house. Then they had a beatbox-session and Uwe became very happy. After that Daniel also met his best friend Pepsi. He had bad news for him: his girlfriend did not want to stay with him any longer. But Pepsi cheered him on to stay.

=== Day 102 ===
Big Brother announced, that the season was extended to 211 Days instead of 148 Days. Big Brother also gave housemate a party in celebration of this change.

=== Day 105 ===
Wissam left the house after 20 Days. The official reason for his left was that he missed his girlfriend. But like he stated in an interview he was discriminated by Robert because of his origin.

=== Day 111 ===
The housemates participated in a test. 29 Questions were asked about love and sex. The housemates with the best results were:

1. Salina 20 pts.
2. Katrin 16 pts.
3. Daniel & Klaus 14 pts.
4. Robert 13 pts.
5. Jenny 12 pts.

=== Day 116 ===
The Drill-Instructor from Season 9 surprised the housemates. He trained the housemates to enhance their fitness.

=== Day 121 ===
Meike got ejected from Big Brother, because of her agreement with her boyfriend that she would walk from the house on 13 May.

=== Day 127 ===
The German sex-therapist Erika Berger visited Klaus in the matchroom. They talked about his behavior in the house, the Lilly-pillow affair and his relationship with Aleksandra.

=== Day 134 ===
The pornstar and former Season 9 housemate Annina Ucatis appeared on the live-show. She talked about her separation with the former Season 9 housemate Sascha Schwan and her visit at the Pinoy Big Brother: Double Up in the Philippines.

=== Day 142 ===
Two new housemates moved in: Rene and Manuela. Hours later, Pico left the house, because he did not recognize himself in the house. And Daniel got bad news from home. His grandmother died. After the death of his two aunts, it is the third death in Daniel's family within four months. Big Brother allowed him to go to the funeral.

=== Day 145 ===
Big Brother announced that the housemates will have a Big Brother Song Contest. Each housemate has to learn a famous German song. The songs will be performed in one of the following live-shows.

=== Day 150 ===
Big Brother announced that the songs of the Big Brother Song Contest will be professionally recorded. Then the songs will be released on the album "Big Brother 10". The album will include a song, which is sung by all housemates. Its title is "Hier im Haus" (Here in the house).

=== Day 153 ===
Sabrina was surprised by meeting her dog Leo for four hours, after winning the prize in the live-show. She also met her brother in the whitebox for ten minutes.

=== Day 155 ===
Kristina, the housemate who had not met her family for five months, met her mother in the whitebox for three minutes.

=== Day 156 ===
Klaus got bad news from home: His dog Mimmi had died.

=== Day 158 ===
Natascha, Katrin and René had a match. They had to decode the participating countries of the 2010 FIFA World Cup. The letters of the countries were mixed up. For every group of four countries they had decoded, the housemates get more and more equipment (i.e. music, food or drinks) for a soccer party. They have won six of eight points.

Marc bet 500 € with Natascha that North Korea is not at the 2010 FIFA World Cup. He said no and she said yes. Natscha won 500 €.

=== Day 162 ===
Klaus could meet his friend Michael in the whitebox for five minutes.

=== Day 163 ===
René got ejected from Big Brother, because of insulting and offending nomination statement during the second open nominations at the live show.

=== Day 165 ===
It was 24 June and that means Christmas was only six months away. That is why Big Brother surprised the housemates with a Christmas party. Drag queen Lorielle London came to the house with presents for the housemates. RTL2 showed this live.

=== Day 166 ===
Marc and Manuela had a match about flags. They had to assign the flags of the nations participating in the 2010 FIFA World Cup. They assigned 19 of 20 flags right. For this, the housemates won a big bowl of ice cream.

=== Day 167 ===
The Big Brother Germany 10 housemates joined their counterparts from Big Brother UK for a Penalty shootout game to coincide with Germany taking on England at the FIFA World Cup in South Africa. Both could see each other on a screen. After five penalties of both teams the score was 1–1. So, the game had to go to sudden-death penalties. After 36 penalties, Robert shot the ball wide and the UK housemate Ife scored to end the shootout 2–1 to the UK Big Brother housemates. The UK Big Brother housemates' prize for winning the shootout was a chance to view the Germany-England game on TV.

=== Day 173 ===
Jenny and Kristina had a match. They had to guess on a world map, where a country (i.e. Germany, Japan or South Africa) is. 32 countries were asked. For every mistake they made, one bed is closed. They made 29 mistakes and so all beds are closed. They and the other housemates were shocked, because of their bad result.

=== Day 175 ===
The housemates got a full water polo equipment for the pool.

=== Day 177 ===
The housemates get a chance to watch the final of the 2010 FIFA World Cup. For watching the final, the housemates have to complete this task: The housemates have to divide themselves into four groups. Two groups with one man and two women and two groups with one man and one woman. The men have to teach the women about soccer. On Day 180, the women will be asked about soccer by Big Brother. If the woman fails, the group is not allowed to look the final.
The groups are:
*Robert, Natascha and Jenny
*Timo, Katrin and Anne
*Marc and Kristina (failed)
*Klaus and Manuela

=== Day 179 ===
After winning the Big Brother Song Contest, Klaus had the chance to choose a winning package. He chose Package 2. Package 2 was a shopping tour in the official kiosk of the German soccer club 1. FC Köln. He could buy things there for 250 €. Before that, Big Brother hoaxed the housemates by saying that Klaus was ejected from Big Brother, which surprised the housemates. After the shopping tour Klaus came back to the house with his purchased items. Then he had to choose four housemates, who could use to items. He chose Anne, Manuela, Marc and Natascha.

=== Day 180 ===
The women had their match. They were asked about soccer. Ten questions were asked. If a woman makes more than three mistakes, the match is failed and so the team can not watch the 2010 FIFA World Cup Third-place play-off between Uruguay and Germany.

Team Robert: Natascha: 4 Mistakes after 8 Questions, failed Jenny: 3 Mistakes, passed

Team Timo: Anne: 3 Mistakes, passed Katrin: 1 Mistake, passed

Team Marc: Kristina: 4 Mistakes after 9 Questions, failed

Team Klaus: Manuela: 2 Mistakes, passed

Team Klaus and Team Timo can watch the game in the match room. Natascha failed the match and so only Robert and Jenny can watch the game. Team Marc must stay at the house.

=== Day 188 ===
The Housemates were given a sound massage by two masseurs.

=== Day 190 ===
At the live show, the housemates had to rate themselves, how sexy they are. First the men had to rate the women. Then the women rated themselves. Then the same happened the other way. The women had no matches and the men two matches. The men won an erotic photo shooting.

=== Day 193 ===
Robert got ejected from Big Brother, because of his disgusting and disrespectful stories about what he did to animals.

=== Day 194 ===
After the male housemates winning an erotic photoshoot, the female housemates got a chance to also get an erotic photoshoot. The female housemates have to clean the pool with toothbrushes for two days á five hours.

Big Brother placed a phone booth in the garden. The housemates superior what does that mean. Big Brother revealed its secret on Monday in the live show.

=== Day 196 ===
Marc, Klaus and Timo had their erotic photoshoot in the match room. Three hours later, Manuela, Oma Anne, Jenny and Natascha had their erotic photoshoot in the match room.

The housemates had to learn the Eurovision Song Contest 2010 flashmob dance until the live show on Monday. They danced to the song "Glow" from the Norwegian duo Madcon, who performed live at the live show.

=== Day 197 ===
In the live show, the nominated Jenny, Oma Anne and Marc got a big icecube. They had to melt as much of the icecube as they could in one hour. The housemate, whose icecube melted the most got a surprise. The winner was Marc. He could phone with his sister.

The phone booth rang while the nominated melted their icecubes. Timo and Natascha answered. Big Brother said that they have to switch their clothes without leaving the booth. They passed and won two packets of filtered cigarettes.

=== Day 198 ===
The German I'm a Celebrity...Get Me Out of Here! winner Ross Antony entered the house for half an hour. He celebrated with the housemates Natascha's birthday.

Marc got a task from the phone booth. He has to row in the pool with a boat for six hours. When the phone alarms, all housemates must be transported with Marc from one side of the pool to the other side.

Natascha got her birthday party with Chinese food and decoration. Previously, her brother congratulated in a video.

=== Day 199 ===
Klaus got a task from the phone booth. The housemates got a packet. In the packet is an alarm clock. The housemates had to pass the packet until it rings. The one, where the alarm clock rings gets a punishment. The housemate, who passes the packet to the one, where the alarm clock rings, gets a reward. But Klaus misunderstood the rules. He thought, that they have to pass the packet, when the alarm clock rings. And so he did.

The housemates got the photos of their erotic photoshooting.

Klaus got his punishment for the phone booth task. He had to check a barrel batteries whether they are empty or full.

=== Day 203 ===
Marc celebrated his 25th birthday in Hawaiian style.

The four nominees were connected to the lie detector and asked about current situation in the house.

=== Day 204 ===
At the live show, Natascha got a letter from her mother.

The Housemates got the results of the lie detector test.

The Surprising results were:
1. Marc is influenced by his opinion on Timo by Klaus.
2. Manuela thinks she is the winner of Big Brother.
3. Klaus talks to himself in order to manipulate the audience.
4. Oma Anne wants to have sex with Marc.

=== Day 207–210 ===
The Ex-housemates Katrin, Daniel, Jenny, Kristina and Salina visited the finalists.

=== Day 209 ===
The animals of the Big Brother house (the chickens and the snake kaa) have to leave the house.

All housemates got a free haircut.

=== Day 210 ===
The housemates had to clean the whole house for the big final.

The five finalists got a dinner from Big Brother.

=== Day 211 ===
Timo wins Big Brother Germany 2010 with 75.2% of the votes against Marc.

== Nominations table ==
	Week 2	Week 4	Week 6	Week 8	Week 10	Week 12	Week 14	Week 16	Week 18	Week 20	Week 22	Week 24	Week 26	Week 27	Week 28	Week 29	Week 30 Final		Nominations received
Timo	Not in House								Katrin	Lilly	Sabrina	René	Oma Anne	Kristina, Timo	Oma Anne	Klaus	Winner (Day 211)		9
Marc	Not in House											Daniel	Katrin	Timo, Jenny	Jenny	Manuela	Runner-Up (Day 211)		3
Oma Anne	Not in House											Kristina	Katrin	Oma Anne, Robert	Oma Anne	Manuela	Third Place (Day 211)		10
Natascha	Not in House											René	Oma Anne	Timo, Natascha	Oma Anne	Oma Anne	Fourth Place (Day 211)		2
Manuela	Not in House										Robert	Klaus	Katrin	Manuela, Natascha	Marc	Marc	Fifth Place (Day 211)		4
Klaus	Exempt	Harald	Carlos	Carlos	Jessica	Jürgen	Eva	Uwe, Pico	Lilly	Lilly	Sabrina	Daniel	Katrin	Klaus, Timo	Jenny	Manuela	Evicted (Day 204)		29
Jenny	Not in House		Salina	Uwe	Uwe	Salina	Aleksandra	Klaus, Aleksandra	~~Klaus~~; ~~Aleksandra~~; Meike	Klaus	~~Klaus~~; Timo	Klaus	Klaus	Klaus, Jenny	Marc	Evicted (Day 197)			5
Robert	Not in House				Jessica	Jürgen	Salina	Uwe, Pico	~~Pico~~; Meike	Pico	Kristina	René	Kristina	Robert, Kristina	Oma Anne	Ejected (Day 193)			12
Kristina	Pisei	Uwe	Klaus	Klaus	Uwe	Aleksandra	Uwe	Uwe, Robert	Meike	Timo	Robert	Oma Anne	Katrin	Kristina, Timo	Evicted (Day 190)				9
Katrin	Not in House								~~Klaus~~; Meike	Klaus	Kristina	René	Oma Anne	Evicted (Day 183)					6
Daniel	No; Nominations	Pluto	Pluto	Klaus	~~Klaus~~; Eva	Aleksandra	Klaus	Klaus, Uwe	~~Klaus~~; Lilly	Robert	~~Klaus~~; Robert	Klaus	Evicted (Day 169)						3
René	Not in House										Salina	Daniel	Ejected (Day 163)						4
Salina	No; Nominations	Iris	Klaus	Klaus	~~Klaus~~; Tobias	Robert	Eva	Robert, Uwe	~~Klaus~~; Meike	Timo	~~Klaus~~; Timo	Evicted (Day 155)							10
Pico	Not in House						Aleksandra	Robert, Klaus	~~Robert~~; Lilly	Robert	Walked (Day 142)								5
Lilly	Not in House					Uwe	Uwe	Uwe, Pico	~~Klaus~~; Meike	Klaus	Evicted (Day 141)								8
Aleksandra	Not in House				Uwe	Jürgen	Eva	Uwe, Pico	Lilly	Evicted (Day 127)									10
Meike	Not in House								Lilly	Ejected (Day 121)									6
Uwe	Exempt	Cora	Pluto	Kristina	Kristina	Aleksandra	Klaus	Klaus, Aleksandra	Evicted (Day 113)										16
Wissam	Not in House						Lilly	Walked (Day 105)											0
Anne	Not in House				Salina	Robert	Aleksandra	Walked (Day 100)											0
Eva	Pisei	Salina	Pluto	Klaus	~~Klaus~~; Sabrina	Aleksandra	Klaus	Evicted (Day 99)											5
Jürgen	Not in House				Eva	Aleksandra	Evicted (Day 85)												3
Jessica	Not in House	Salina	Klaus	Klaus	~~Klaus~~; Uwe	Evicted (Day 71)													2
Tobias	No; Nominations	Iris	Pluto	Klaus	~~Klaus~~; Jenny	Walked (Day 68)													1
Cora	Pisei	Iris	Pluto	Klaus	Walked (Day 58)														1
Carlos	No; Nominations	Iris	Klaus	Klaus	Evicted (Day 57)														3
Iris	Pisei	Harald	Carlos	Ejected (Day 45)															6
Pluto	No; Nominations	Iris	~~Iris~~	Evicted (Day 43)															6
Harald	No; Nominations	Iris	Evicted (Day 29)																2
Micaela	No; Nominations	Walked (Day 16)																	0
Pisei	Cora	Walked (Day 16)																	0
Horst	Walked (Day 2)																		0
Notes	1	2	3	4	5	none	6	7	8, 9, 10	11	12	13, 14, 15	none	16	17, 18	19, 20, 21	none		
Up for Eviction	Cora; Eva; Iris; Kristina; Pisei	Harald; Iris; Sabrina	Klaus; Pluto	Carlos; Klaus; Kristina; Uwe	Eva; Jessica; Sabrina; Uwe	Aleksandra; Jürgen	Aleksandra; Eva; Klaus	Klaus; Pico; Uwe	Aleksandra; Lilly; ~~Meike~~	Klaus; Lilly; Robert; Timo	Robert; Sabrina	Daniel; Klaus; ~~René~~	Katrin; Oma Anne	Kristina; Timo	Jenny; Marc; Oma Anne	Klaus; Manuela; Marc; Oma Anne	Manuela; Marc; Natascha; Oma Anne; Timo		
Walked	Horst	Cora, Micaela, Pisei	none		Cora	Tobias	none	Anne, Wissam	none		Pico	none							
Ejected	none			Iris	none				Meike	none		René	none		Robert	none			
Evicted	Pisei; 4 votes to fake evict	Harald; 66.1% to evict	Pluto; 70.9% to evict	Carlos; 80.4% to evict	Jessica; 90.8% to evict	Jürgen; 71.5% to evict	Eva; 52.6% to evict	Uwe; 63.1% to evict	Aleksandra; 50.4% to evict	Lilly; 79.2% to evict	Sabrina; 86.5% to evict	Daniel; 72.5% to evict	Katrin; 53.1% to evict	Kristina; 26.5% to save	Jenny; 58.6% to evict	Klaus; 51.3% to evict	Manuela; 3.6% (out of 5)	Natascha; 6.9% (out of 5)	
Evicted	Pisei; 4 votes to fake evict	Harald; 66.1% to evict	Pluto; 70.9% to evict	Carlos; 80.4% to evict	Jessica; 90.8% to evict	Jürgen; 71.5% to evict	Eva; 52.6% to evict	Uwe; 63.1% to evict	Aleksandra; 50.4% to evict	Lilly; 79.2% to evict	Sabrina; 86.5% to evict	Daniel; 72.5% to evict	Katrin; 53.1% to evict	Kristina; 26.5% to save	Jenny; 58.6% to evict	Klaus; 51.3% to evict	Oma Anne; 7.9% (out of 3)	Marc; 24.8% (out of 2)	
Evicted	Pisei; 4 votes to fake evict	Harald; 66.1% to evict	Pluto; 70.9% to evict	Carlos; 80.4% to evict	Jessica; 90.8% to evict	Jürgen; 71.5% to evict	Eva; 52.6% to evict	Uwe; 63.1% to evict	Aleksandra; 50.4% to evict	Lilly; 79.2% to evict	Sabrina; 86.5% to evict	Daniel; 72.5% to evict	Katrin; 53.1% to evict	Kristina; 26.5% to save	Jenny; 58.6% to evict	Klaus; 51.3% to evict	Timo; 75.2% to win		

Housemates started in the Main House Housemates started in the Secret House

=== Notes ===
- ^Note 1 In the first round of nominations, the female housemates in the Secret House had to nominate among themselves. The housemate with the most votes will be fake evicted and move to the Main House.
- ^Note 2 Cora originally left the house on Day 12 due to issues with her work, but resolved them and asked to return. Following a public vote, Cora was allowed to return to the house on Day 15.
- ^Note 3 The female housemate with the most votes in a public vote was given immunity from eviction. The saved female was Iris with 44,4%. As such, Pluto's vote that she received during second round of nominations has not been counted.
- ^Note 4 The housemates had to make their first open nominations. The housemates had to throw cakes on the person they nominated. The four nominated were cut to two. The saved persons were Kristina with 11.0% and Uwe with 1.4%.
- ^Note 5 The housemate with the most votes in a public vote is getting immunity from eviction. Robert, Jürgen, Anne and Aleksandra were not selectable. The saved person was Klaus with 92.7%. The four nominated were cut to two. The saved persons were Uwe with 1.3% and Eva with 1.2%.
- ^Note 6 The three nominated were cut to two. The saved person was Aleksandra with 13.4%.
- ^Note 7 Everybody had to nominate two housemates for eviction. Before the live show one person was saved. The saved person was Pico.
- ^Note 8 At the live show Klaus and Uwe played a match. The winner could decide, which housemate is already nominated for the following nomination. The winner was Uwe, he chose Aleksandra.
- ^Note 9 Only female housemates could be nominated.
- ^Note 10 Because of the ejection of Meike, only Aleksandra and Lilly were nominated.
- ^Note 11 The four nominated were cut to two. Robert and Timo received the fewest votes and were taken off the list.
- ^Note 12 The housemate with the most votes in a public vote is getting immunity from eviction. The saved person was Klaus with 89.0%.
- ^Note 13 At the live show Robert and Salina played a match. They played a round of Jenga. The winner could decide, which housemate is saved from the next nomination. The winner was Robert, he chose Timo.
- ^Note 14 The housemates had to make their second open nominations.
- ^Note 15 Because of the ejection of René, only Daniel and Klaus were nominated.
- ^Note 16Everybody had to nominate 2 housemates. The two housemates with the most nominations will go to the jail area until next Monday. The audience will decide which housemate will get immunity until the final. The other housemate will be evicted. The housemates could nominate themselves.
- ^Note 17 All housemates got playing cards with the pictures of all housemates (except of Timo). The first housemate has to push his nomination to the next housemate. He decides whether the person should go through or he exchanges the card. So it goes with each until all are through. The housemates could nominate themselves.
- ^Note 18 The three nominated were cut to two. The saved person was Marc with 23.2% of the votes.
- ^Note 19 The housemates will have their third open nominations by throwing pictures of the housemates into the fire. All housemates except of Timo can be nominated.
- ^Note 20 The four nominated were cut to three. The saved person was Marc with 7.9% of the votes.
- ^Note 21 The three nominated were cut to two. The saved person was Oma Anne with 15.7% of the votes.
