= BBX (gene) =

Human protein-coding gene

Identifiers
- Aliases: BBX, ARTC1, HBP2, HSPC339, MDS001, bobby sox homolog (Drosophila), HMG-box containing
- External IDs: MGI: 1917758; GeneCards: BBX
Available structures
PDB	Ortholog search: PDBe RCSB
PDB	List of PDB id codes 1WZ6

Gene location (Human)
Chr.	Chromosome 3 (human)
Band	3q13.12	Start	107,522,936 bp
Band	3q13.12	End	107,811,324 bp

Gene location (Mouse)
Chr.	Chromosome 16 (mouse)
Band	16|16 B5	Start	50,012,207 bp
Band	16|16 B5	End	50,252,753 bp
RNA expression pattern
Bgee	Human / Mouse (ortholog); Top expressed in: corpus epididymis; tail of epididymis; caput epididymis; corpus callosum; lactiferous duct; inferior ganglion of vagus nerve; seminal vesicula; Achilles tendon; saphenous vein; testicle / Top expressed in: cumulus cell; spermatid; ascending aorta; pineal gland; pituitary gland; seminiferous tubule; aortic valve; lumbar spinal ganglion; stroma of bone marrow; tail of embryo; More reference expression data
BioGPS	n/a
Gene ontology
Molecular function	DNA binding; DNA-binding transcription factor activity, RNA polymerase II-specific
Cellular component	nucleus; nucleoplasm; cytosol
Biological process	bone development; regulation of transcription, DNA-templated; transcription, DNA-templated; regulation of transcription by RNA polymerase II
Sources:Amigo / QuickGO
Orthologs
Databases	NCBI: entry; OMA: entry
Species	Human	Mouse
Entrez	56987	70508
Ensembl	ENSG00000114439	ENSMUSG00000022641
UniProt	Q8WY36	Q8VBW5
RefSeq (mRNA)	NM_001142568; NM_001276286; NM_020235	NM_027444; NM_001347240
RefSeq (protein)	NP_001136040; NP_001263215; NP_064620	NP_001334169; NP_081720
Location (UCSC)	Chr 3: 107.52 – 107.81 Mb	Chr 16: 50.01 – 50.25 Mb
PubMed search
- Wikidata
View/Edit Human	View/Edit Mouse

HMG box transcription factor BBX also known as bobby sox homolog or HMG box-containing protein 2 is a protein that in humans is encoded by the BBX gene.
