= Grande Fratello season 11 =

Season of television series

Grande Fratello
- Season 11
- Presented by: Alessia Marcuzzi
- No. of days: 183
- No. of housemates: 34
- Winner: Andrea Hirai Cocco
- Runner-up: Ferdinando Giordano

Release
- Original network: Canale 5
- Original release: 18 October 2010 – 18 April 2011

Season chronology
- ← Previous; Season 10 Next → Season 12

Grande Fratello 11 was the eleventh season of the Italian version of the reality show franchise Big Brother. The show premiered on 18 October 2010 and concluded on 18 April 2011. It was the longest regular Grande Fratello season and prime time show in Italy. Alessia Marcuzzi returned as the main host of the show. The house had been radically renewed from the last season. The winner of this season, Andrea Cocco, received a €300,000 grand prize.

== Housemates ==
Housemates	Age	Birthplace	Occupation	Day entered	Day exited	Status
Andrea Hirai Cocco	32	Rome	Model and PR	1	183	Winner
Ferdinando Giordano	30	Salerno	Salesman	1	183	Runner-up
Margherita Zanatta	28	Varese	Radio speaker	1	183	3rd Place
Jimmy Barba	39	London, United Kingdom	Dancer and farmer	71	183	4th Place
Rosa Baiano	23	Caserta	Student and fashion model	1	176	25th Evicted
Emanuele Pagano	26	Florence	Carpenter and model	92	176	24th Evicted
Davide Roberto Baroncini	22	San Giovanni la Punta	Reprensentative	1	169	23rd Evicted
Rajae Bezzaz	21	Tripoli, Libya	Interpreter	127	162	22nd Evicted
Biagio D'Anelli	27	Rodi Garganico	Event organizer	85	155	21st Evicted
Giordana Sali	23	Ostia	Model and PR	64; 127	65; 155	20th Evicted
Guendalina Tavassi	24	Rome	Actress	1	148	19th Evicted
Angelica Livraghi	22	Rome	Bartender	1	141	18th Evicted
Raoul Tulli	36	Rome	Butcher	92	134	17th Evicted
Roberto Manfredini	29	Carpi	Dancer and model	85	127	16th Evicted
Erinela Bitri	23	Berat, Albania	Saleswoman	85	120	15th Evicted
Valentina Costanzo	25	Rome	Bar owner	85	113	14th Evicted
Nathan Lelli	24	Castel San Pietro Terme	Bricklayer	85	102	Ejected
Olivia Lechner	29	Salzburg, Austria	Employee	64	99	13th Evicted
Rosalba "Rosy" Maggiulli	22	Andria	Bartender	85	92	Walked
Giuliano Cimetti	36	Fino Mornasco	Workman and gigolo	1	92	12th Evicted
Matteo Casnici	32	Desenzano del Garda	Photomodel	8	85	Ejected
Massimo Scattarella	35	Bari	TV personality, Grande Fratello season 10 housemate	71	85	Ejected
Pietro Titone	24	Palermo	Former representative and former soccer player	1	85	Ejected
Ferdinando "Nando" Colelli	23	Aprilia	Workman and porn actor	1	78	11th Evicted
Francesca Giaccari	26	San Pietro Vernotico	Professor	1	71	10th Evicted
David Lyoen	26	Neuilly-sur-Seine, France	Commercial officer	1	71	9th Evicted
Caroline Cecere	22	Salvador, Brazil	Model and dancer	36	64	8th Evicted
Ilaria Natali	25	Florence	Saleswoman, hostess and babysitter	36	57	7th Evicted
Sheila Capodanno	28	Naples	Journalist	1	50	6th Evicted
Alessandro Marino	37	Salerno	Violinist, arranger, producer and model	8	43	5th Evicted
Davide Clivio	23	Atri	Student and model	1	36	4th Evicted
Elisa Lisitano	22	Augusta	Student	8	29	3rd Evicted
Norma Silvestri	27	Kinshasa, DR Congo	Dancer	1	22	2nd Evicted
Cristina Nadia Alberto	27	Milan	Journalist	1	15	1st Evicted

== Nominations table ==
=== Week 2 – Week 14 ===
	Week 2	Week 3	Week 4	Week 5	Week 6	Week 7	Week 8	Week 9	Week 10		Week 11	Week 12	Week 13	Week 14	Nominations received
Andrea	Cristina	Norma	Clivio	David	Alessandro	David	Ilaria	Angelica	David	Nominated	Rosa	Giuliano	Giuliano	Olivia	
Ferdinando	Exempt			Clivio	Exempt	Sheila	Ilaria	Nando	Exempt	Francesca	Nando	Olivia	Olivia	Olivia	
Margherita	Rosa	Matteo	Elisa	Matteo	Alessandro	Francesca	Ilaria	Matteo	Francesca	Francesca	Rosa	Giuliano	Giuliano	Biagio	
Jimmy	Not in House										Exempt		Giuliano	Rosy	
Rosa	Clivio	Matteo	David	David	Andrea	David	Ilaria	Andrea	David	Andrea	Andrea	Olivia	Olivia	Olivia	
Emanuele	Not in House													Exempt	
Davide	Clivio	Norma	Elisa	Clivio	Sheila	David	Ilaria	Angelica	David	Andrea	Margherita	Giuliano	Olivia	Olivia	
Biagio	Not in House												Exempt	Rosy	
Giordana	Not in House								Exempt	Walked (Day 65)					
Guendalina	Rosa	Matteo	Elisa	David	Alessandro	David	Ilaria	Caroline	David	Francesca	Rosa	Pietro	Giuliano	Biagio	
Angelica	Exempt				Alessandro	David	Ilaria	Andrea	Nando	Andrea	Nando	Olivia	Giuliano	Olivia	
Raoul	Not in House													Exempt	
Roberto	Not in House												Exempt	Biagio	
Erinela	Not in House												Exempt	Olivia	
Valentina	Not in House												Exempt	Biagio	
Nathan	Not in House												Exempt	Rosy	
Olivia	Not in House								Exempt	Francesca	Rosa	Matteo	Giuliano	Biagio	14
Rosy	Not in House												Exempt	Olivia	3
Giuliano	Margherita	Andrea	Clivio	Andrea	Andrea	David	Ilaria	Angelica	Nando	Andrea	Nando	Pietro	Andrea	Evicted (Day 92)	10
Agostino	Not in House												Nominated	Evicted (Day 92)	N/A
Massimo	Not in House										Nominated	Exempt	Ejected (Day 85)		0
Matteo	Exempt	Norma	Elisa	Clivio	Alessandro	Sheila	Ilaria	Angelica	Nando	Andrea	Margherita	Olivia	Ejected (Day 85)		11
Pietro	Rosa	Matteo	Elisa	Clivio	Alessandro	Francesca	Francesca	Angelica	Francesca	Francesca	Rosa	Giuliano	Ejected (Day 85)		6
Nando	Clivio	Matteo	Elisa	Clivio	Alessandro	David	Ilaria	Angelica	David	Francesca	Rosa	Evicted (Day 78)			6
Francesca	Clivio	Pietro	Clivio	Clivio	Alessandro	Margherita	Ilaria	Andrea	David	Nominated	Evicted (Day 71)				11
David	Cristina	Andrea	Elisa	Andrea	Sheila	Sheila	Rosa	Angelica	Andrea	Evicted (Day 71)					22
Caroline	Not in House				Exempt		Ilaria	Angelica	Evicted (Day 64)						1
Ilaria	Not in House				Exempt		Margherita	Evicted (Day 57)							12
Sheila	Cristina	Matteo	Elisa	David	Alessandro	David	Evicted (Day 50)								6
Alessandro	Exempt	Pietro	David	David	Sheila	Evicted (Day 43)									9
Clivio	Margherita	Matteo	Matteo	Andrea	Evicted (Day 36)										13
Elisa	Exempt	Pietro	David	Evicted (Day 29)											8
Norma	Cristina	Davide	Evicted (Day 22)												3
Cristina	Pietro	Evicted (Day 15)													4
Nominated	Clivio; Cristina; Rosa	Matteo; Norma; Pietro	Clivio; David; Elisa	Clivio; David	Alessandro; Sheila	David; Francesca; Sheila	Francesca; Ilaria; Margherita; Rosa	Andrea; Angelica; Caroline; Nando	David; Matteo; Nando	Andrea; Francesca	Nando; Rosa	Giuliano; Olivia; Pietro	Giuliano; Olivia	Biagio; Olivia; ~~Rosy~~	
Walked	none									Giordana	none			Rosy	
Ejected	none											Massimo; Matteo; Pietro	none		
Evicted	Cristina; 55% to evict	Norma; 41% to evict	Elisa; 67% to evict	Clivio; 68% to evict	Alessandro; 70% to evict	Sheila; 51% to evict	Ilaria; 70% to evict	Caroline; 57% to evict	David; 55% to evict	Francesca; 6 of 11 votes to evict	Nando; 79% to evict	Eviction cancelled	Giuliano; 59% to evict	Olivia; 52% to evict	
Evicted	Cristina; 55% to evict	Norma; 41% to evict	Elisa; 67% to evict	Clivio; 68% to evict	Alessandro; 70% to evict	Sheila; 51% to evict	Ilaria; 70% to evict	Caroline; 57% to evict	David; 55% to evict	Francesca; 6 of 11 votes to evict	Massimo; 51% to enter	Eviction cancelled	Agostino; 42% to enter	Olivia; 52% to evict	

=== Week 15 – Finale ===
	Week 15	Week 16	Week 17	Week 18	Week 19	Week 20	Week 21	Week 22		Week 23	Week 24	Week 25			Week 26 Final		Nominations received
Andrea	Roberto	Raoul	Roberto	Roberto; Raoul	Raoul; Biagio	Emanuele	Giordana; Biagio	Giordana; Biagio	Jimmy	Emanuele	Emanuele; Jimmy	Emanuele	Margherita to be finalist	Jimmy	Winner (Day 183)		25
Ferdinando	Roberto	Biagio	Erinela	Roberto; Raoul	Raoul; Biagio	Davide	Guendalina; Davide	Davide; Biagio	Biagio	Rajae	Davide; Andrea	Margherita	Jimmy to be finalist	Margherita	Runner-Up (Day 183)		5
Margherita	Biagio	Biagio	Ferdinando	Biagio; Ferdinando	Raoul; Biagio	Biagio	Rajae; Giordana	Giordana; Biagio	Biagio	Emanuele	Emanuele; Jimmy	Emanuele	Andrea to be finalist	Jimmy	Third Place (Day 183)		9
Jimmy	Biagio	Biagio	Erinela	Roberto; Biagio	Biagio; Raoul	Biagio	Guendalina; Andrea	Giordana; Biagio	Biagio	Rajae	Andrea; Davide	Andrea	Ferdinando to be finalist	Rosa	Fourth Place (Day 183)		11
Jimmy	Biagio	Biagio	Erinela	Roberto; Biagio	Biagio; Raoul	Biagio	Guendalina; Andrea	Giordana; Biagio	Biagio	Rajae	Andrea; Davide	Andrea	Ferdinando to be finalist	Rosa	Fourth Place (Day 183)		11
Rosa	Roberto	Valentina	Erinela	Roberto; Raoul	Raoul; Biagio	Davide	Davide; Guendalina	Davide; Biagio	Davide	Davide	Davide; Jimmy	Jimmy	Ferdinando to be finalist	Jimmy	Evicted (Day 176)		11
Emanuele	Roberto	Valentina	Roberto	Roberto; Raoul	Raoul; Biagio	Biagio	Guendalina; Rajae	Giordana; Biagio	Biagio	Rajae	Andrea; Davide	Andrea	Evicted (Day 176)				14
Davide	Nathan	Biagio	Biagio	Ferdinando; Biagio	Biagio; Raoul	Angelica	Giordana; Rajae	Giordana; Biagio	Biagio	Emanuele	Emanuele; Jimmy	Evicted (Day 169)					17
Rajae	Not in House				Exempt		Giordana; Emanuele	Giordana; Biagio	Biagio	Emanuele	Evicted (Day 162)						9
Biagio	Roberto	Raoul	Erinela	Roberto; Raoul	Raoul; Jimmy	Jimmy	Margherita; Andrea	Davide; Giordana	Davide	Evicted (Day 155)							52
Giordana	Walked (Day 65)				Exempt		Guendalina; Rajae	Rajae; Davide	Evicted (Day 155)								12
Guendalina	Biagio	Biagio	Ferdinando	Ferdinando; Roberto	Emanuele; Raoul	Angelica	Giordana; Rajae	Evicted (Day 148)									5
Angelica	Roberto	Valentina	Erinela	Roberto; Raoul	Raoul; Biagio	Davide	Evicted (Day 141)										10
Raoul	Roberto	Biagio	Roberto	Roberto; Biagio	Emanuele; Biagio	Evicted (Day 134)											19
Roberto	Nathan	Biagio	Emanuele	Biagio; Raoul	Evicted (Day 127)												20
Erinela	Nathan	Biagio	Biagio	Evicted (Day 120)													5
Valentina	Biagio	Biagio	Evicted (Day 113)														3
Nathan	Roberto	Ejected (Day 102)															3
Olivia	Evicted (Day 99)																14
Rosy	Walked (Day 92)																3
Nominated	Biagio; Nathan; Roberto	Biagio; Raoul; Valentina	Biagio; Erinela; Ferdinando; Roberto	Biagio; Raoul; Roberto	Biagio; Emanuele; Raoul	Angelica; Biagio; Davide	Giordana; Guendalina; Rajae	Biagio; Giordana	Biagio; Davide; Jimmy	Emanuele; Rajae	Andrea; Davide; Emanuele; Jimmy	Andrea; Emanuele	none	Jimmy; Rosa	Andrea; Ferdinando; Jimmy; Margherita		
Nominated	Biagio; Nathan; Roberto	Biagio; Raoul; Valentina	Biagio; Erinela; Ferdinando; Roberto	Biagio; Raoul; Roberto	Biagio; Emanuele; Raoul	Angelica; Biagio; Davide	Giordana; Guendalina; Rajae	Biagio; Giordana	Biagio	Emanuele; Rajae	Andrea; Davide; Emanuele; Jimmy	Andrea; Emanuele	none	Jimmy; Rosa	Andrea; Ferdinando; Jimmy; Margherita		
Ejected	Nathan	none															
Evicted	Eviction cancelled	Valentina; 75% to evict	Erinela; 70% to evict	Roberto; 78% to evict	Raoul; 57% to evict	Angelica; 52% to evict	Guendalina; 58% to evict	Giordana; 79% to evict	Biagio; 58% to evict	Rajae; 55% to evict	Davide; 51% to evict	Emanuele; 72% to evict	Ferdinando; 2 of 5 votes to be finalist	Rosa; 56% to evict	Jimmy; 5% (out of 4)	Margherita; 15% (out of 3)	
Evicted	Eviction cancelled	Valentina; 75% to evict	Erinela; 70% to evict	Roberto; 78% to evict	Raoul; 57% to evict	Angelica; 52% to evict	Guendalina; 58% to evict	Giordana; 79% to evict	Biagio; 58% to evict	Rajae; 55% to evict	Davide; 51% to evict	Emanuele; 72% to evict	Ferdinando; 2 of 5 votes to be finalist	Rosa; 56% to evict	Ferdinando; 49% (out of 2)	Andrea; 51% to win	

== Controversy ==
=== Blasphemy and problems with televoting ===
In the night between 17 and 18 December the housemate Matteo Casnici, during a conversation with Davide Baronicini and Francesca Giaccari, accidentally uttered a blasphemous expression: the incident was the subject of much controversy, especially by Catholic viewers, who following the program. For this reason, Grande Fratello has taken measures against the housemate and has decided not to resort to ejection, as happened in similar cases in previous editions, but to punish him with the nomination of office.

Subsequently, former housemate of GF10 Massimo Scattarella, ejected for blasphemy, asked to be reinstated in the house or, alternatively, a measure similar to the one he suffered for Matteo Casnici. Scattarella was a guest in the studio in the episode of December 27, 2010, reminding the authors of the show that all the housemates sign a contract with Endemol that explicitly prohibits swearing or cursing, under penalty of disqualification from the show. Grande Fratello then gave Massimo a second chance, making the public decide whether or not he could become an official competitor of GF11. The man entered the house on December 27, 2010 and waited for the response of the televoting serving a week of permanence inside the "Tugurio" in solitude.

In the end the public voted for the readmission and Massimo entered the house as an official housemate on January 3, 2011. This decision was the subject of much controversy by the Moige, which on January 4, 2011 issued an official press release in which the reality show of Canale 5 was accused of providing viewers with an indecent and deplorable show, in which the limits of public decency have been abundantly exceeded, since in the past the blasphemy on live television had always been heavily condemned and had never been forgiveness or the reintegration of a blasphemer.

The Catholic daily Avvenire also lashed out against the broadcast by publishing an article in which the reality show was accused of making a spectacle of the offense against God and the good education that unites believers and non-believers. Subsequently, on January 8, 2011, due to a deplorable episode that occurred inside the house, the authors unexpectedly canceled the weekly televoting between the three housemates at risk of elimination, namely Giuliano Cimetti, Olivia Lechner and Pietro Titone. Grande Fratello, in an official statement issued by the broadcast site, added that it would fully reimburse all spectators who had voted during the week.

The reasons of this cancellation are due to another blasphemy pronounced on the night between 7 and 8 January 2011 by Pietro Titone. Following this event, there were further controversies and the issue of blasphemies on TV has aroused strong negative reactions from many Italian religious associations; for this reason and for the low level reached by the housemates of this edition, Mediaset, publisher of the reality show, in the episode of January 10, 2011 considered it appropriate to intervene with an official statement in which it ejected all the housemates guilty of having uttered a curse inside of the house, namely Matteo Casnici, Pietro Titone and Massimo Scattarella (who pronounced a blasphemy during Grande Fratello 10). An unprecedented decision in the history of Big Brother.

A few days after the mass expulsion, the national consumer union started a collective action against the televoting of the broadcast. In fact Massimiliano Dona, UNC secretary general, considered it appropriate that viewers who through the televoting system had decided to readmit Massimo Scattarella into the house were reimbursed, believing that none of them would have cast their vote and invested their money, if only they could have imagined that the outcome of the televoting would then have been canceled due to the decision of the publisher Mediaset, which following the succession of controversies that the issue of blasphemies on TV and the very readmission of the competitor had provoked, subsequently ejected all contestants accused of cursing, including Scattarella. On January 17, 2011, Alessia Marcuzzi opened the 14th evening episode by announcing that viewers who had previously voted for Massimo Scattarella's reinstatement would also be fully reimbursed.

=== Online casting dispute ===
Another controversy was generated by the online casting televoting mechanism. For some months, in fact (precisely from 3 September to 15 December 2010), the public was asked to vote by sending a text message, a presentation video uploaded by the aspiring competitors on the official website of the broadcast. The competitor who entered the house would then be chosen by the authors among the fifty most voted videos. However, according to the accusations, the vote of the viewers was useless, since on the broadcast website a ranking of the fifty most voted is drawn up and none of the top fifteen appears to have reached live television, to the detriment of viewers who had voted for over three months, his own favorite. It was also assumed that the winner of the casting, Nathan Lelli, who ranked 25th in the ranking, belonged to a well-known agency in the entertainment world once again to intend by the authors the total disinterest of the public's vote in favor a recommendation from the housemate's agency.

For this reason, the antitrust has also been interested in opening an investigation into the televoting system, which will examine the positions of RTI, Telecom Italia and TXT Polymedia for the next few months in order to establish whether or not there have been violations to the detriment of viewers. In response, on January 14, 2011, Grande Fratello issued a press release on its official website confirming the regular management of online casting televoting and claiming that the competitor chosen to enter the house, Nathan Lelli, had no connection with management, which, moreover, would not have been contrary to the regulation.

When the controversy seemed to have subsided, on January 27, Nathan Lelli pronounced a further blasphemy while organizing a joke against other housemates: the immediate request by the consumer associations for the suspension of the weekly televoting and the expulsion of Lelli (who saw him at risk of elimination together with Biagio D'Anelli and Roberto Manfredini), which took place in the late afternoon of the same 27 January; also in this case, Grande Fratello assured that all viewers participating in the televoting would be reimbursed.
