= List of Italian films of 2012 =

This is a list of Italian films first released in 2012 (see 2012 in film).

Title	Director	Cast	Genre
2012
10 Rules for Falling in Love	Cristiano Bortone	Guglielmo Scilla, Vincenzo Salemme	Romantic comedy
33 Giri	Riccardo Di Gerlando	Marco Pingiotti, Massimo Botti	Drama
ACAB – All Cops Are Bastards	Stefano Sollima	Pierfrancesco Favino, Marco Giallini, Filippo Nigro	Crime-drama
AmeriQua	Giovanni Consonni, Marco Bellone	Bobby Kennedy III, Alessandra Mastronardi, Eva Amurri	Romantic comedy
Anita Garibaldi	Claudio Bonivento	Valeria Solarino, Giorgio Pasotti	Drama
Balancing Act	Ivano De Matteo	Valerio Mastandrea, Barbora Bobuľová	Drama
Barabbas	Roger Young	Billy Zane, Cristiana Capotondi, Filippo Nigro	Drama
Benvenuti al Nord	Luca Miniero	Claudio Bisio, Alessandro Siani, Valentina Lodovini	Comedy
The Butterfly Room	Jonathan Zarantonello	Barbara Steele, Ray Wise, Erica Leerhsen	Mystery
Caesar Must Die	Paolo and Vittorio Taviani	Salvatore Striano	Drama
Cherry on the Cake	Laura Morante	Laura Morante, Isabelle Carré	Romance
Colpi di fulmine	Neri Parenti	Christian De Sica, Lillo & Greg, Luisa Ranieri	Comedy
Diaz – Don't Clean Up This Blood	Daniele Vicari	Claudio Santamaria, Jennifer Ulrich, Elio Germano	Drama
Discovery at Dawn	Susanna Nicchiarelli	Margherita Buy, Susanna Nicchiarelli, Sergio Rubini	Drama
Dormant Beauty	Marco Bellocchio	Toni Servillo, Alba Rohrwacher, Isabelle Huppert	Drama
Dracula 3D	Dario Argento	Thomas Kretschmann, Asia Argento, Rutger Hauer	Horror
Every Blessed Day	Paolo Virzì	Luca Marinelli, Thony	Romance
A Flat for Three	Carlo Verdone	Carlo Verdone, Pierfrancesco Favino, Marco Giallini	Comedy
Garibaldi's Lovers	Silvio Soldini	Valerio Mastandrea, Alba Rohrwacher, Claudia Gerini	Comedy
Un giorno speciale	Francesca Comencini	Filippo Scicchitano	Romance
Gladiators of Rome	Iginio Straffi	Luca Argentero, Laura Chiatti, Belén Rodríguez	Animation
The Ideal City	Luigi Lo Cascio	Luigi Lo Cascio, Catrinel Menghia, Luigi Maria Burruano	Thriller
L'intervallo	Leonardo Di Costanzo	Salvatore Ruocco, Francesca Riso	Drama
It Was the Son	Daniele Ciprì	Toni Servillo, Giselda Volodi	Comedy-drama
The Landlords	Edoardo Gabbriellini	Valerio Mastandrea, Elio Germano, Gianni Morandi	Drama
The Last Shepherd	Marco Bonfanti	-	Documentary
La leggenda di Kaspar Hauser	Davide Manuli	Vincent Gallo, Claudia Gerini, Elisa Sednaoui	Drama
The Lookout	Michele Placido	Mathieu Kassovitz, Daniel Auteuil	Crime
Love Is Not Perfect	Francesca Muci	Anna Foglietta, Giulio Berruti	Romance
Magnificent Presence	Ferzan Özpetek	Elio Germano, Margherita Buy, Vittoria Puccini	Drama
Me and You	Bernardo Bertolucci	Jacopo Olmo Antinori, Tea Falco	Drama
A Perfect Family	Paolo Genovese	Sergio Castellitto, Claudia Gerini, Carolina Crescentini	Comedy
Piazza Fontana: The Italian Conspiracy	Marco Tullio Giordana	Valerio Mastandrea, Pierfrancesco Favino, Fabrizio Gifuni	Crime-drama
Pinocchio	Enzo D'Alò	Maurizio Micheli, Rocco Papaleo	Animation
Reality	Matteo Garrone	Aniello Arena	Comedy-drama
The Red and the Blue	Giuseppe Piccioni	Margherita Buy, Riccardo Scamarcio, Roberto Herlitzka	Drama
September Eleven 1683	Renzo Martinelli	F. Murray Abraham, Enrico Lo Verso, Jerzy Skolimowski	Historical
Il sogno del maratoneta	Leone Pompucci	Luigi Lo Cascio, Laura Chiatti, Alessandro Haber	Biographical
Tell No One	Ivan Silvestrini	Josafat Vagni, Valeria Bilello, Francesco Montanari	Comedy
Terramatta	Costanza Quatriglio	-	Documentary
They Call It Summer	Paolo Franchi	Jean-Marc Barr, Isabella Ferrari, Eva Riccobono	Romance
Tulpa	Federico Zampaglione	Claudia Gerini, Michela Cescon	Giallo
Tutto tutto niente niente	Giulio Manfredonia	Antonio Albanese, Fabrizio Bentivoglio, Paolo Villaggio	Comedy
Twice Born	Sergio Castellitto	Penélope Cruz, Emile Hirsch	Drama
La vita non perde valore	Wilma Massucco	-	Documentary
Viva l'Italia	Massimiliano Bruno	Raoul Bova, Ambra Angiolini, Michele Placido	Comedy
The Worst Christmas of My Life	Alessandro Genovesi	Fabio De Luigi, Cristiana Capotondi	Comedy

== See also ==
- 2012 in Italy
- 2012 in Italian television
