= Raoul Trujillo =

American actor and dancer

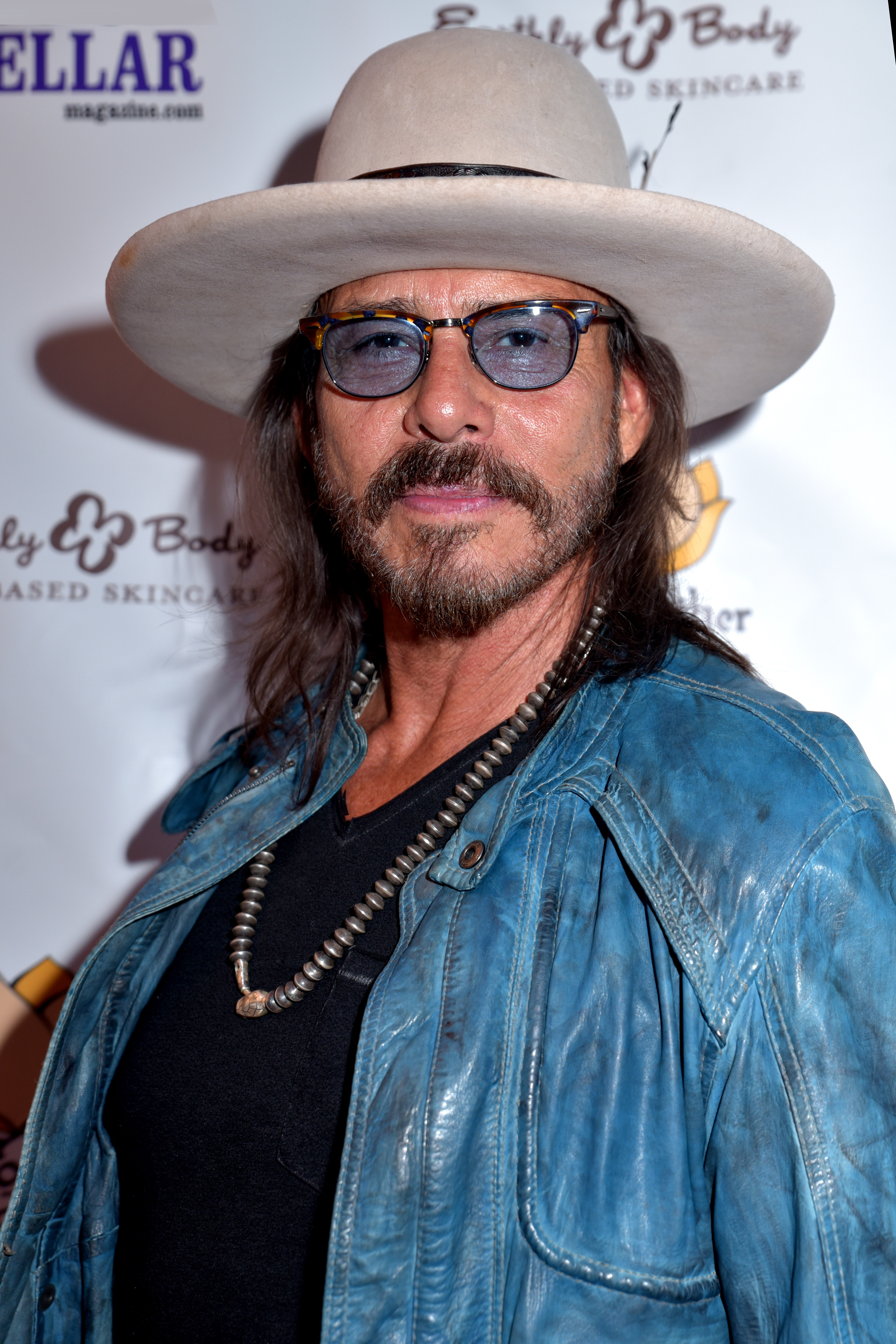
- Trujillo in 2019
- Born: Raoul Max Trujillo; May 8, 1955 (age 71); New Mexico, U.S.
- Occupations: Actor, dancer, choreographer, theatre director
- Years active: 1977–present

Raoul Max Trujillo (born May 8, 1955) is an American actor, dancer, choreographer and theatre director. A former soloist with the Nikolais Dance Theatre, he is the original choreographer and co-director for the American Indian Dance Theatre. His career spans more than 45 years in film, television and theatre. He has also hosted a series of dancing programs, and is a Critics' Choice Award nominee.

Trujillo is best known for playing Zero Wolf, a ruthless Mayan slave catcher and the main antagonist of Mel Gibson's Apocalypto (2006), and for playing the Iroquois chief Kiotsaeton in the film Black Robe. He has appeared in numerous high-profile and acclaimed films, including The New World, Cowboys and Aliens, Riddick, Blood Father, Sicario, and its sequel Sicario: Day of the Soldado. He also starred in dozens of television programs in both supporting and starring roles, including True Blood, Lost Girl, Da Vinci's Demons, Salem, The Blacklist, and Jamestown. He most recently starred on Mayans M.C. as Che "Taza" Romero.

== Early life ==
Raoul Trujillo was born on May 8, 1955 in New Mexico. He is a mixed blood descendant of Mexican, Tlaxcalan (Nahuatl), Ute, Apache, Comanche, Pueblo, French, and Spanish (including Sephardic Jew and Andalusian Moor).

== Career ==
He started work in the theatre as a scenic painter and landed his first job in 1977 as an actor/dancer in a production of Equus. He began dancing in Los Angeles in 1978 at the University of Southern California and saw his first modern dance and ballet productions; Pilobolus, Martha Graham and Rudolf Nureyev. The next two years, he trained extensively with the Toronto Dance Theatre and Nikolais/Louis Dance Lab in New York City on scholarships. He was asked to join Nikolais Dance Theatre under the direction of the master Alwin Nikolais, who became his mentor and he began touring the world. He also learned scenic, costume and lighting design during this time from 1980 to 1987. After leaving the company, he began his solo work as dancer and choreographer and commenced his journey into shamanic ceremonials and incorporating native myths and legends in his work.

After the first decade of performing as a dancer, Trujillo became the choreographer and co-director for the American Indian Dance Theatre, the first professional native dance company incorporating traditional dance with contemporary retelling of myths and legends. He choreographed "The Shaman's Journey" for the Asia Society in New York, which was adapted into a short film for PBS on Alive from Off Center. He went on to join creative partners Alejandro Roncerria and René Highway in Toronto. This work resulted in creating successful theatre pieces for Native Earth Performing Arts. His work with Roncerria continued and he helped establish the Aboriginal Dance Project at the Banff Centre to further train Indigenous dancers from all over the world. In 2002, he received the CANCOM Ross Charles award in Canada to attend the Banff Center's screenwriters workshop for aboriginal storytellers.

Trujillo began his screen acting career in 1988 in Canada, and currently holds over 107 film and television credits. He choreographed the dances, ceremonies and rituals for Terrence Malick's The New World, as well as acting in the role of Tomocomo.

== Filmography ==
=== Film ===
Year	Title	Role	Director	Notes
1990	Divided Loyalties	Cornplanter	Mario Azzopardi	
1991	Scanners II: The New Order	Peter Drak	Christian Duguay	
1991	The Adjuster	Matthew Keller	Atom Egoyan	
1991	Black Robe	Kiotsaeton	Bruce Beresford	
1991	Clearcut	Eugene	Ryszard Bugajski	
1991	White Light	Hatchet	Al Waxman	
1992	Montréal Stories	Passionate Man	Denys Arcand	
1992	L'automne sauvage	Regis Santerre	Gabriel Pelletier	
1992	The Swordsman	Jojo	Michael Kennedy	
1992	Shadow of the Wolf	Big Tooth	Jacques Dorfmann	
1993	Paris, France	Minter	Jerry Ciccoritti	
1994	REW FFWD	Peter	Denis Villeneuve	Short film
1994	Highlander: The Final Dimension	Senghi Kul Khan	Andy Morahan	
1997	Song of Hiawatha	Pau-Puk-Keewis	Jeffrey Shore	
1998	Waking Up Horton	Horton	Harry Bromley Davenport	
1998	August 32nd on Earth	Thom	Denis Villeneuve	Uncredited
2004	The Blue Butterfly	Alejo	Léa Pool	
2005	Blood Trail	Bloody Hands	Barry Tubb	
2005	The New World	Tomocomo	Terrence Malick	
2006	Apocalypto	Zero Wolf	Mel Gibson	
2007	The Lives of Angels	Castro	Stephen Jules Rubin	short film
2008	Ancestor Eyes	Charlie	Kalani Queypo	short film
2008	Spinners	Alfonso	Joseph von Stern	short film
2009	Doc West	Medicine Man	Terence Hill; Giulio Base	
2010	Love Ranch	Hernan Prado	Taylor Hackford	
2011	Cowboys & Aliens	Black Knife	Jon Favreau	
2013	Blaze You Out	Brujo	Diego Joaquin Lopez; Mateo Frazier	
2013	Riddick	Lockspur	David Twohy	
2014	Persecuted	Mr. Gray	Daniel Lusko	
2015	Sicario	Rafael	Denis Villeneuve	
2016	Blood Father	The Cleaner	Jean-François Richet	
2017	Hochelaga, Land of Souls	Le Prophète	François Girard	
2018	Octavio Is Dead!	Octavio Tyler	Sook-Yin Lee	
2018	Sicario: Day of the Soldado	Rafael	Stefano Sollima	
2018	22 Chaser	Wayne	Rafal Sokolowski	
2019	Cold Pursuit	Thorpe	Hans Petter Moland	
2021	America: The Motion Picture	Geronimo	Matt Thompson	
2023	Blue Beetle	Ignacio Carapax / OMAC	Ángel Manuel Soto	
2023	Killing Faith	William Shakespeare	Ned Crowley	

=== Television ===
Year	Title	Role	Notes
1990	Counterstrike	Rojo	Episode: "Dead in the Air"
1990	The Hitchhiker	James	Episode: "Tough Guys Don't Whine"
1990	Street Legal	Raoul Hidalgo	Episode: "Double Agenda"
1990	E.N.G.	Lucas Green	Episode: "A Long Way from Hopeful"
1992	The Broken Cord	Emil Bearheart	Television film
1993	Gross Misconduct	Andy Greenberg	Television film
1993	Medicine River	Floyd	Television film
1993–95	Destiny Ridge	Sam Whitehorse	Main role; Seasons 1-2
1994	Trial at Fortitude Bay	Simon Amituq	Television film
1995	Black Fox	Running Dog	TV miniseries
1995	The Invaders	Carlos Suarez	TV miniseries
1996	JAG	Arturo	Episode: "Sightings"
1996	Lonesome Dove: The Series	Gabe LaRoche	Episode: "Bounty"
1996	Renegade	Ricardo Pena	Episode: "Hog Calls"
1996	The Sentinel	Spirit Guide	Episode: "Flight"
1997	Sisters and Other Strangers	Jimmy Coyote	Television film
1997	Silk Stalkings	Ernesto	Episode: "Silent Witness"
1997	House of Frankenstein	Woody	TV miniseries
1998	Witness to Yesterday	Tecumseh	Episode: "Tecumseh"
1998	The Adventures of Sinbad	Korla	Episode: "The Guardians"
1999	La Femme Nikita	Chris Ferriera	Episode: "Looking for Michael"
1999	War of 1812	Tecumseh	TV miniseries
2000	The Avengers: United They Stand	Namor (voice)	Episode: "To Rule Atlantis"
2000	Canada: A People's History	Iroquois Warrior	Episode: "When the World Began"
2000	The Secret Adventures of Jules Verne	The Inquisitor	Episode: "The Inquisitor"
2001	Largo Winch	Jacob Santos	Episode: "Just Cause"
2001	MythQuest	Tezcatlipoca	Episode: "Quetzalcoatl"
2003	Adventure Inc.	Agent Harami	Episode: "Secret of the Sands"
2003	Betrayed	Bill Lebret	Television film
2003	Veritas: The Quest	Ramiro	Episode: "Mummy Virus"
2003	Freedom: A History of Us	Matthew Lyon (voice)	Episode: "Revolution"
2004	Frankenfish	Ricardo Alma	Television film
2005	Into the West	Red Cloud	TV miniseries
2007	Tin Man	Raw	TV miniseries
2008	True Blood	Longshadow	Recurring role; 4 episodes
2009	The Unit	Father Sebastian	Episode: "The Spear of Destiny"
2009	In Plain Sight	Felix Calderon	Episode: "Jailbait"
2009	Triassic Attack	Dakota	Television film
2011	Moby Dick	Queequeg	TV miniseries
2011	Neverland	Holy Man	TV miniseries
2011–12	Heartland	Renard	Guest role; 2 episodes
2011–12	Lost Girl	The Garuda	Guest role; 3 episodes
2013	Longmire	Grady Littlefoot	Episode: "Tuscan Red"
2013	Strike Back	Miguel Gomez	Guest role; 2 episodes
2013	Republic of Doyle	Eli Kane	Episode: "Bon Cop, Bueno Cop"
2014	Da Vinci's Demons	Topa Inca Yupanqui	Supporting role; Season 2
2014	Manhattan	Javier	Episode: "Spooky Action At a Distance"
2014	The Wrong Mans	Carlos Espinoza	Supporting role; Series 2
2015	Major Crimes	Javier Mendoza	Episode: "Internal Affairs"
2015	Banshee	Sani Crow	Episode: "All the Wisdom I Got Left"
2015	Saints & Strangers	Massasoit	TV miniseries Nominated - Critics Choice Television Award for Best Supporting Actor in a Movie/Miniseries
2015	Salem	The Shaman	Recurring role; 4 episodes
2016	The Blacklist	Mato	Recurring role; 3 episodes
2016	MacGyver	Joaquin "El Noche" Sancola	Episode: "Can Opener"
2016	Frontier	Machk	Guest role; 3 episodes
2017	Get Shorty	Josias	Guest role; 2 episodes
2017–19	Jamestown	Opchanacanough	Main role
2018–2022	Mayans M.C.	Che "Taza" Romero	Main role; 40 episodes
2019	Hawaii Five-0	Alejandro Vega	Episode: "Ho'opio 'ia e ka noho ali'i a ka ua"
2025	Dark Winds	Budge Baca	Season 3 recurring
2025	Untamed	Jay Stewart	Recurring role
2026	Dutton Ranch	Mariano Reyes	Recurring role

== As himself ==
Year	Title	Notes	Role
2002	Chiefs	TV mini-series documentary	
2006	Making 'The New World'	video documentary	
2006	Becoming Mayan: Creating Apocalypto	video documentary short	
2007	Beyond the Yellow Brick Road: The Making of Tin Man	TV documentary	
2007	Wild Horses and Renegades	documentary	Narrator
