= 10 Rules for Falling in Love =

- Directed by: Cristiano Bortone
- Written by: Cristiano Bortone; Fausto Brizzi; Annalaura Ciervo; Pulsatilla
- Starring: Guglielmo Scilla
- Cinematography: Roberto De Nigris
- Music by: Andrea Farri
- Release date: 16 March 2012
- Running time: 96 minutes
- Country: Italy
- Language: Italian

10 Rules for Falling in Love (Italian: 10 regole per fare innamorare) is a 2012 romantic comedy film written and directed by Cristiano Bortone and starring Guglielmo Scilla, Vincenzo Salemme and Enrica Pintore.

== Plot ==
In the 2012 Italian film, 10 Regole Per Fare Innamorare, or in English, 10 Rules for Falling in Love, Renato (Vincenzo Salemme), guides his young son, Marco (Giuglielmo Scilla) on the rules of love. Renato is a womanizing father trying to reconnect with his clumsy son over a woman he has fallen for. Throughout the movie, Renato teaches Marco the Decalogue of Seduction: Ten foolproof rules to make any woman fall in love. On this journey of discovering love, Renato and Marco try to reconnect while setting up the latter with someone they are in love with.

== Cast ==
- Guglielmo Scilla as Marco
- Vincenzo Salemme as Renato
- Enrica Pintore as Stefania
- Giulio Berruti as Ettore
- Pietro Masotti as Paolo
- Piero Cardano as Ivan
- Fatima Trotta as Mary
- Giorgio Verducci as Sandrone
- Cinzia Mascoli as Laura

== See also ==
- List of Italian films of 2012
