= 2012 in Italy =

- Decades: 1990s; 2000s; 2010s; 2020s; 2030s
- See also: History of Italy; Timeline of Italian history; List of years in Italy

Events from the year 2012 in Italy:

== Incumbents ==
- President: Giorgio Napolitano
- Prime Minister: Mario Monti

== Events ==
- 13 January - Costa Concordia disaster – a cruise liner capsized, killing at least 32 people on board.
- 13 January - Italy's credit rating is downgraded to BBB+ by Standard & Poor's.
- 15 February - Several Indian fishermen are killed in a firefight between riflemen of the Italian Navy and pirates off the coast of the Kerala, India. The soldiers involved are being held by the authorities in New Delhi.
- 18 February - Pope Benedict XVI creates 22 new cardinals during his fourth consistory.
- 12 May - 85th National Gathering of the Alpini in Bolzano.
- 19 May - Brindisi school bombing
- 20 May - 2012 Northern Italy earthquakes – The regions of Emilia-Romagna, Lombardy and Veneto are hit by an earthquake of magnitude 6.0 with the epicenter in the provinces of Modena, Mantua, Ferrara, Rovigo, Bologna and Reggio Emilia.
- 29 May - Emilia-Romagna and Lombardy are again affected by three new strong earthquakes with a magnitude greater than 5 (5.8, 5.3, 5.2).
- 27 September - Italian newspaper editor Alessandro Sallusti is sentenced to 14 months in prison for publishing libelous remarks, in a landmark case that significantly limits free speech in Italy.
- 26 September - Former prime minister Silvio Berlusconi is sentenced to 4 years in the first degree (including 3 condoned) in the process of tax fraud on the acquisition of television rights group Mediaset.
- 31 September - The Monti administration endorses the reorganizing of the Provinces, which will start in 2014. The provinces will drop from 86 to 51. Among the most discussed mergers are Livorno with Pisa, Pescara with Chieti and Avellino with Benevento. The Provincial Administration instead will disappear in January 2013.
- 21 December - Prime Minister Mario Monti hands in his resignation to President Giorgio Napolitano.

=== Music ===
- 18 February- Emma Marrone, wins the 62nd edition of Sanremo with the song "non è l'inferno"

== Sport ==
- 2011–12 Serie A
- 2011–12 Serie B
- 2011–12 Coppa Italia
- 2012 Supercoppa Italiana
- 2012 Giro d'Italia
- 2012 Giro di Lombardia
- 1 July - Italy loses the UEFA Euro 2012 Final to Spain

== Deaths in 2012 ==
- January 29 – Oscar Luigi Scalfaro, 93, politician and former President
- February 19 – Renato Dulbecco, 97, virologist and Nobel Prize laureate
- March 1
  - Lucio Dalla, 68, singer and songwriter
  - Germano Mosconi, 79, television presenter
- March 21 – Tonino Guerra, 92, poet
- March 25 – Antonio Tabucchi, 68, writer
- July 3 – Sergio Pininfarina, 85, car designer and politician
- August 31 – Carlo Maria Martini, 85, prelate and former archbishop of Milan
- October 10 – Carla Porta Musa, 110, essayist and poet
- December 30 – Rita Levi-Montalcini, 103, scientist and Nobel Prize laureate

== See also ==
- 2012 in Italian television
- List of Italian films of 2012
