= The Monster of Florence (2025 miniseries) =

Italian true crime drama series

- Genre: True crime; Thriller
- Created by: Stefano Sollima; Leonardo Fasoli
- Directed by: Stefano Sollima
- Starring: Marco Bullitta; Valentino Mannias; Francesca Olia; Liliana Bottone; Giacomo Fadda; Antonio Tintis; Giordano Mannu
- Country of origin: Italy
- Original language: Italian
- No. of episodes: 4

Production
- Producers: Stefano Sollima; Lorenzo Mieli; Gina Gardini
- Production companies: The Apartment; AlterEgo

Original release
- Network: Netflix
- Release: October 22, 2025

The Monster of Florence (Italian: Il Mostro, lit. 'The Monster') is an Italian true crime limited series created and directed by Stefano Sollima. It was released worldwide on Netflix on October 22, 2025. The series is based on the true story of Italy's most notorious serial killer case, commonly known as the Monster of Florence.

== Premise ==
The series dramatizes the investigation into a string of eight double homicides in the countryside around Florence between 1968 and 1985. Couples parked in lovers' lanes were targeted and murdered by an unknown assailant armed with a .22 caliber Beretta pistol. The killings led to one of Italy's longest and most complex criminal investigations, raising lasting questions about the identity of the perpetrator.

== Cast ==
- Marco Bullitta as Stefano Mele
- Valentino Mannias as Salvatore Vinci
- Francesca Olia as Barbara Locci
- Giacomo Fadda as Francesco Vinci
- Antonio Tintis as Giovanni Mele
- Liliana Bottone as ADA Silvia Della Monica

== Production ==
The Monster of Florence consists of four episodes and is co-created by Stefano Sollima and Leonardo Fasoli, who previously worked together on Gomorrah and ZeroZeroZero. The series is produced by Lorenzo Mieli, Stefano Sollima, and Gina Gardini for The Apartment and AlterEgo.

Filming took place in Florence and surrounding areas where the events took place in real life, with Paolo Carnera serving as director of cinematography, striving for a period-accurate and documentary-like tone.

== Release ==
The series had its world premiere out of competition at the 82nd Venice International Film Festival. It was released worldwide on Netflix on October 22, 2025, coinciding with the streaming service's 10th anniversary in Italy.

== Episodes ==
No.	Title	Directed by	Written by	Original release date
1	"Episode 1"	Stefano Sollima	Stefano Sollima, Leonardo Fasoli	October 22, 2025
2	"Episode 2"	Stefano Sollima	Stefano Sollima, Leonardo Fasoli	October 22, 2025
3	"Episode 3"	Stefano Sollima	Stefano Sollima, Leonardo Fasoli	October 22, 2025
4	"Episode 4"	Stefano Sollima	Stefano Sollima, Leonardo Fasoli	October 22, 2025

== Reception ==
On the review aggregator website Rotten Tomatoes, 62% of 13 critics' reviews are positive. Metacritic, which uses a weighted average, assigned a score of 58 out of 100, based on 6 critics, indicating "mixed or average" reviews.
