= Tell No One (2012 film) =

- Directed by: Ivan Silvestrini
- Written by: Roberto Proia
- Starring: Josafat Vagni
- Cinematography: Rocco Marra
- Edited by: Alessia Scarso
- Music by: Leonardo Rosi
- Release date: September 7, 2012
- Running time: 81 min
- Country: Italy
- Language: Italian

Tell No One (Italian: "Come non detto", As not said) is a 2012 Italian comedy film, directed by Ivan Silvestrini. It is based on a novel with the same title written by Roberto Proia.

== Plot summary ==
Mattia is a homosexual guy from Rome, the lover of a young Spanish student named Eduard. He cannot tell his parents about his love affair, because of their very conservative opinions and the particular situation in Rome - everyone Mattia meets in the city hates gay people, and condemns them as unclean beings.
Mattia plans to secretly run away with Eduard while telling his parents that he intends to leave Italy in order to find work. Mattia's plan seems to work, but the troubles begin when he discovers that Eduard is coming to Italy in order to meet Mattia's parents. Given the relative liberal attitudes in Spain towards gay people, Eduard thinks that Mattia has already told his parents and his environment. Mattia tries to get along with everyone for a while, but in the end is forced to reveal his homosexuality to his parents, who understand him.
Finally, Mattia can fulfill his need for love by going to Spain with Eduard.

== Cast ==
- Josafat Vagni: Mattia
- José Dammert: Eduard
- Valeria Bilello: Stefania
- Francesco Montanari: Giacomo / Alba Paillettes
- Monica Guerritore: Aurora
- Ninni Bruschetta: Rodolfo
- Victoria Cabello: herself

== Awards ==
Year	Category	Recipient(s)	Result
Golden Graal Student's Choice Awards
2013	Best Director, Comedy	Ivan Silvestrini	Won
2013	Best Actor, Comedy	Francesco Montanari	Nominated

== See also ==
- List of Italian films of 2012
