= Moran Atias =

Israeli actress and model (born 1981)

Moran Atias מורן אטיאס
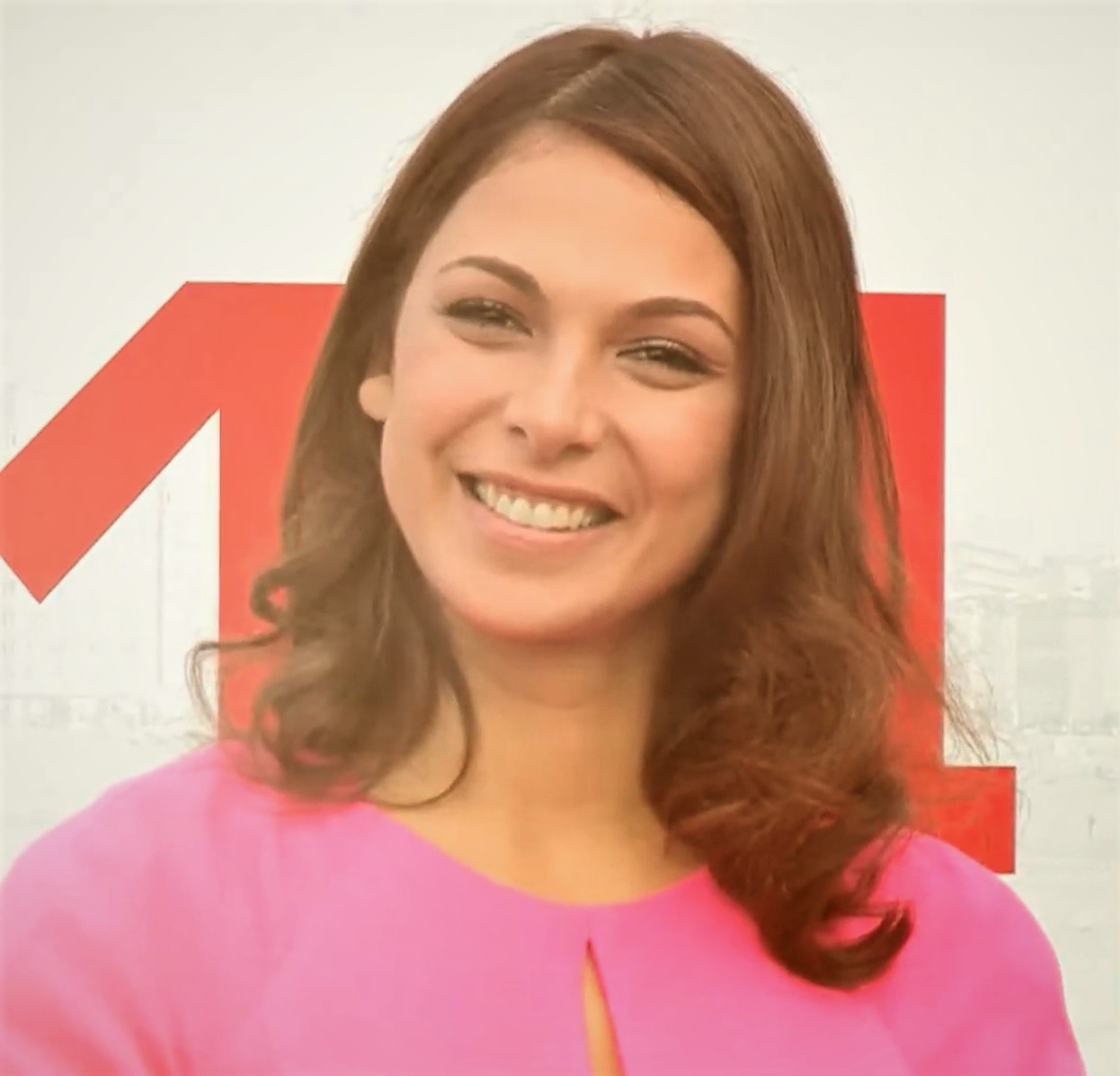
- Atias in 2014
- Born: 9 April 1981 (age 45); Haifa, Israel
- Citizenship: Israel; United States
- Occupations: Actress; model; producer
- Years active: 1996–present
- Notable work: Crash (2008); Third Person (2013); Tyrant (2014–16); The Resident (2018)
- Children: 1
- Modeling information
- Height: 1.75 m (5 ft 9 in)
- Hair color: Black
- Eye color: Brown
- Agency: Anonymous Content

Moran Atias (Mor-AHN Ah-tee-AHS; Hebrew: מורן אטיאס; born 9 April 1981) is an Israeli actress and model. She gained fame in the Italian films Gas, Oggi sposi, and Mother of Tears. She is best known for her work with Paul Haggis in the 2008 TV series Crash and the 2013 film Third Person. She also starred on the FX television series Tyrant.

== Early life ==
Atias was born in Haifa, Israel, to parents of Moroccan Jewish descent. Her grandfather was a rabbi. She appeared on the youth television programme Out of Focus at age 15. Her plan to serve as a soldier in the Israel Defense Forces was frustrated by a diagnosis of meningitis at age 17. She pursued modelling instead in Germany and then in Italy, where she was discovered and became a model for Roberto Cavalli. Her younger sister is Israeli actress Shani Atias.

== Career ==
=== Modelling ===
Atias first appeared on television when she was 15, starring in the Israeli youth program Out of Focus. By the age of 17, she went to Germany to launch her modelling career. She modelled for Roberto Cavalli, D&G, and BBG jewellers. Later, she hosted an Italian talk show.

=== Acting, other film work ===
==== Israel and Italy ====
After establishing herself as a model, she was encouraged to pursue a career in acting. She has appeared in English-, Italian-, Hebrew-, and Spanish-language films, and was nominated for Best Actress at the Festival Sguardo al Femminile for her role in Menahem Golan's 2005 Israeli film Days of Love. Her work in these films led to her being cast in the Italian feature film Gas, in which she played a provocative drug addict tasked with seducing a gay drug addict. She followed that up with the romantic comedy Oggi Sposi, directed by Luca Luncini and Mother of Tears, the third and final installment of Dario Argento's supernatural trilogy of horror The Three Mothers. Mother of Tears premièred at the 2007 Toronto International Film Festival and the Rome Film Festival.

==== United States ====
In 2008, she was cast in the role of the illegal immigrant Inez in the drama series Crash, based on Paul Haggis's Oscar-winning film. After one season, she became the female lead opposite Dennis Hopper. Working with Haggis led to her being cast in his film The Next Three Days.

In 2011, Atias worked with Cynthia Mort on the television project Radical, playing to role of Ana, which Mort had written specifically for her. In 2012, she was cast in the critically acclaimed Israeli television series Allenby Street, directed by Assaf Bernstein of Fauda fame, where she played the stripper Mika, a formerly Orthodox Jewish girl who avoids her childhood secret while living a complex nightlife. She also served as a producer and worked to adapt it into a US series. She was cast in the new FX series Tyrant by the creators of the successful television series Homeland by creator and fellow Israeli, Gideon Raff.

Her work on the film The Next Three Days led to Third Person, a project that Atias pitched and helped develop with Paul Haggis. She was chosen to play the role of 'Monika,' a Romanian gypsy. To prepare for the role, she lived in Italy for four months and immersed herself in the gypsy lifestyle, living without the basics of running water or electricity. She studied with Michael Margota at the Italian Actor's Studio to perfect the Italian and Romanian accents. She also served as a co-producer and a co-consultant for the script. The film premiered at the 2013 Toronto International Film Festival.

== Humanitarian work ==
In Italy, she was the 2005–06 spokeswoman for the City of Milan in their campaigns against graffiti and animal cruelty in the city.

Atias participated in the Artists for Peace and Justice (APJ) volunteer mission with Sean Penn following the 2010 Haiti earthquake, in which she assisted the evacuation of refugees to Florida. During her second trip to Haiti, she took part in a workshop at Ciné Institute in Jacmel. In May 2010, she worked with APJ and hosted and organized a charity event at the Cannes Film Festival. In November 2010, she hosted and organized a charity event for APJ in New York, with proceeds going to the first free high school for the children of the slums of Haiti.

She is a goodwill ambassador for IsraAid, and took part in humanitarian work in Haiti after the 2010 earthquake there.

In April 2020, Atias volunteered at the COVID-19 patients ward in Tel Aviv Sourasky Medical Center in Tel Aviv.

== Personal life ==
In February 2017, Atias became a naturalized U.S. citizen. In 2022 Moran gave birth to a daughter as a single mother.

== Filmography ==
=== Film ===
Year	Title	Role(s)	Notes
2005	GAS	Monica	
2005	Days of Love	Sigal	
2006	The Roses of the Desert	Aisha	
2007	Mother of Tears	Mater Lachrymarum	
2008	You Don't Mess with the Zohan	Eti	Uncredited
2009	Land of the Lost	Pakuni Woman	Uncredited
2009	Oggi sposi	Alopa	
2010	Kavod	Ronit	
2010	The Next Three Days	Erit	
2012	Crazy Eyes	Ex	
2013	Third Person	Monika	Also co-producer
2018	Speed Kills	Contessa	

=== Television ===
Year	Title	Role(s)	Notes
2008–09	Crash	Inez	Main role
2009	Il bene e il male	Elisabetta	2 episodes
2010	CSI: NY	Marina Garito	Episode: "Rest in Peace, Marina Garito"
2011	Rules of Engagement	Sophia	Episode: "Anniversary Chicken"
2011	CSI: Miami	Olivia Hunter	Episode: "G.O."
2012	White Collar	Christie	Episode: "Deadline"
2014–16	Tyrant	Leila Al-Fayeed	Main role
2017	24: Legacy	Sidra	Recurring role
2018	The Resident	Renata Morali	Main role (season 1)
2019	The Village	Ava Behzadi	Lead role
2022	Animal Kingdom	Louise Thompson	Recurring role

== Television ==
=== Hosting ===
- Kdam Eurovision (2005) – First Channel, Israel
- Deal or No Deal
- Game programme (13 total), (2005) – Channel 10, Israel
- "Cinderella" Biographical documentary of Moran Atias, prime time (2004) – Channel 10, Israel

=== TV series ===
- Crash, a Starz network series, recurring cast (2008), and second season (2009) regular cast
- CSI: NY, guest star (2010)
- Rules of Engagement episode "Anniversary Chicken", guest star as Sophia (2011)
- White Collar, role of Christie (2011)
- Tyrant, role of Leila Al-Fayeed (2014–2016)
- 24: Legacy, role of Sidra (2017)
- Animal Kingdom, role of Louise Thompson (2021)

=== Italian TV programmes as sidekick ===
- "Carramba Che Fortuna" – RaiUno, Italy (2000)
- "Superconvenscion" – RaiDue, Italy (2000–01)
- "Italiani" – Canale 5, Italy (2001)
- "Matricole & Meteore" – Italia 1, Italy (2003)
- "I Raccomandati" – RaiUno, Italy (2003–04)
- "Natalino Balasso Show" – Italia 1, Italy (2004–05)

== Magazines ==
- Men's Health United States
- Nylon Guys United States
- Gioia magazine cover
- Vanity Fair Italy
- Cosmopolitan – Covers for Spain, Israel, Serbia, Mexico
- Maxim United States
- Maxim Israel Cover
- Flaunt United States
- Men's Fitness United States
- 944 USA
- 60 Magazine – writing a monthly column for an established fashion magazine for the female audience.
- Rosh 1 – teen magazine
- Photo Italy, Max Italy 2002–2004, Corriere della Sera Special Moda, Capital Italy, Class Italy, Onda TV, Happy Web, Leisha Israel, AT Israel, Pnai Plus Israel, GO Magazine, Blazer Israel, Olam HaIsha Israel, Yedioth and Maariv Israeli newspapers

== Radio work ==
- Shaker – Radio RTL 102.5 – a radio programme created and presented by Moran Atias (2005)

== Awards ==
- 2014 – Capri Mediterranean Award for her role in Third Person
- 2014 – LA Femme Filmmaker Award Humanitarian Award
