= 2012 in Italian television =

This is a list of Italian television related events from 2012.

== Events ==
- 5 January – Francesca Michielin wins the fifth season of X Factor.
- 10 March – 21-year-old acro pole flag man Stefano Scarpa wins the third season of Italia's Got Talent.
- 17 March – Singer and actor Andrés Gil and his partner Anastasia Kuzmina win the eighth season of Ballando con le stelle.
- 1 April – Sabrina Mbarek wins the twelfth season of Grande Fratello.
- 7 December – Chiara Galiazzo wins the sixth season of X Factor.

== Debuts ==
=== RAI ===
==== Serials ====
- The young Montalbano – prequel of Il commissario Montalbano, by Gianluca Maria Tavarelli, with David Riondino as Salvo Montalbano; 2 seasons.
- The family – by Riccardo Milani and Riccardo Donna, with Stefania Sandrelli, Gianni Cavina, Stefania Rocca and Alessandro Gassmann; 3 seasons and 2 spin-offs. Soap-opera about the Rengoni, a family of Lombard industrialists.
- Questo nostro amore ("This our love") – by Luca Ribuoli and Isabella Leoni, with Nerì Marcorè and Anna Valle; 3 seasons. The stories of two families in Turin (an irregular couple and a patriarchal clan of Sicilians), living in the same condominium, interlace for twenty years, from the Sixties to the Eighties, till to the birth of a child, son of the two firstborns.

==== Talent shows ====
- Tale e quale show – an Italian adaptation of Your Face Sounds Familiar.

== Television shows ==
=== Rai ===
==== Drama ====
- Caruso, la voce dell'amore ("The voice of love") – biopic by Stefano Reali, with Gianluca Terranova in the title role, Vanessa Incontrada and Martina Stella; 2 episodes.
- One Thousand and One Nights – by Marco Pontecorvo, with Marco Bocci and Vanessa Hessler, freely adapted from the Arabian nights; 2 episodes.
- Santa Barbara – by Carmine Elia, with Vanessa Hessler in the title role and Massimo Wertmuller.
- Walter Chiari, fino all'ultima risata ("Till the last laugh") – biopic by Enzo Monteleone, with Alessio Boni in the title role; 2 episodes.

==== Serials ====
- Nero Wolfe – with Francesco Pannofino in the title role and Pietro Sermonti as Archie Goodwin; the adventures of the two detectives are relocated in the Rome of the dolce vita.

==== News and educational ====
- Berlino la mutante ("Berlin the mutant") – documentary by Andrea De Fusco.

=== 2000s ===
- Grande Fratello (2000–present)
- Ballando con le stelle (2005–present)
- X Factor (2008–present)

=== 2010s ===
- Italia's Got Talent (2010–present)

== Networks and services ==
=== Launches ===
Network	Type	Launch date	Notes	Source
Sky Uno +1 HD	Cable and satellite	25 October		

=== Conversions and rebrandings ===
Old network name	New network name	Type	Conversion Date	Notes	Source
DeA Super	Super!	Cable and satellite	18 March		
TV Cultura	Rádio e Televisão Cultura	Cable and satellite	Unknown		

=== Closures ===
Network	Type	Closure date	Notes	Source
Video Italia	Cable and satellite	31 December		
E!	Cable and satellite	31 August		

== Deaths ==
Date	Name	Age	Cinematic Credibility
19 February	Renato Dulbecco	97	Host of Sanremo Music Festival 1999

== See also ==
- 2012 in Italy
- List of Italian films of 2012
