= Public Disorder =

2025 Italian television series

- Genre: Crime drama
- Created by: Carlo Bonini; Filippo Gravino
- Written by: Luca Giordano; Bernardo Pellegrini; Filippo Gravino; Elisa Dondi; Carlo Bonini
- Directed by: Michele Alhaique
- Starring: Marco Giallini; Adriano Giannini; Valentina Bellè; Pierluigi Gigante
- Composer: Mokadelic
- Country of origin: Italy
- Original language: Italian
- No. of series: 1
- No. of episodes: 6

Production
- Producers: Carlo Degli Esposti; Nicola Serra
- Cinematography: Vittorio Omodei Zorini
- Production company: Cattleya

Original release
- Network: Netflix
- Release: 15 January 2025

Public Disorder (Italian: ACAB - La serie) is an Italian crime drama television series. It is a sequel to the film ACAB – All Cops Are Bastards by Stefano Sollima. It was released on Netflix in January 2025.

== Cast ==
- Marco Giallini as Ivano 'Mazinga' Valenti
- Adriano Giannini as Michele Nobili
- Valentina Bellè as Marta Sarri
- Pierluigi Gigante as Salvatore Lovato
- Fabrizio Nardi as Pietro Fura
- Donatella Finocchiaro as Anna Fura
- Federico Mainardi as Agent Juri Bonamin
- Daniele Natali as Agent Antonino Flores
- Maurizio Tesei as Agent Enzo Pignarelli
- Aniello Arena as Arturo Manna
