= Oggi sposi (2009 film) =

- Directed by: Luca Lucini
- Written by: Fausto Brizzi; Marco Martani; Fabio Bonifacci; Luca Lucini
- Produced by: Riccardo Tozzi
- Starring: Luca Argentero; Moran Atias; Dario Bandiera; Isabella Ragonese; Carolina Crescentini; Filippo Nigro; Francesco Montanari; Gabriella Pession
- Cinematography: Manfredo Archinto
- Edited by: Fabrizio Rossetti
- Music by: Giuliano Taviani
- Production company: Cattleya
- Distributed by: Universal Pictures International
- Release date: 2009
- Running time: 120 minutes
- Country: Italy
- Language: Italian

Oggi sposi (Just Married) is a 2009 Italian comedy film directed by Luca Lucini.

== Cast ==
- Luca Argentero as Nicola Impanato
- Moran Atias as Alopa
- Dario Bandiera as Salvatore Sciacca
- Isabella Ragonese as Chiara Malagò
- Carolina Crescentini as Giada
- Filippo Nigro as Fabio Di Caio
- Francesco Montanari as Attilio Panecci
- Gabriella Pession as Sabrina Monti
- Michele Placido as Sabino Impanato
- Renato Pozzetto as Renato Di Caio
- Lunetta Savino as Violetta Abbatescianni in Impanato
- Hassani Shapi as Ambassador
- Francesco Pannofino as Peppino Impanato
- Caterina Guzzanti as poliziotta Ghedini
- Yuri Buzzi as Rudy
