= Sicario: Day of the Soldado =

2018 film by Stefano Sollima

- Theatrical release poster
- Directed by: Stefano Sollima
- Written by: Taylor Sheridan
- Produced by: Basil Iwanyk; Edward L. McDonnell; Molly Smith; Thad Luckinbill; Trent Luckinbill
- Starring: Benicio del Toro; Josh Brolin; Isabela Merced; Jeffrey Donovan; Manuel Garcia-Rulfo; Catherine Keener
- Cinematography: Dariusz Wolski
- Edited by: Matthew Newman
- Music by: Hildur Guðnadóttir
- Production companies: Black Label Media; Thunder Road Pictures
- Distributed by: Columbia Pictures (through Sony Pictures Releasing; United States, Canada, Latin America and Spain); Lionsgate (International)
- Release dates: June 11, 2018 (Antara Polanco); June 29, 2018 (United States)
- Running time: 122 minutes
- Country: United States
- Language: English
- Budget: $35–45 million
- Box office: $75.8 million

Sicario: Day of the Soldado (also known as Sicario 2: Soldado or simply Soldado) is a 2018 American action crime thriller film directed by Stefano Sollima and written by Taylor Sheridan. A sequel to 2015's Sicario, the film features Benicio del Toro, Josh Brolin, Jeffrey Donovan and Raoul Trujillo reprising their roles, with Isabela Merced, Manuel Garcia-Rulfo and Catherine Keener joining the cast. The story relates to human trafficking at the U.S.–Mexico border and a covert effort by the United States government to incite increased conflict among the cartels.

Sicario: Day of the Soldado was released in the United States and Canada on June 29, 2018, by Sony Pictures Releasing, while it was distributed internationally by Lionsgate (excluding Latin America and Spain, where it was distributed by Sony). The film is dedicated to the memory of Jóhann Jóhannsson, the composer of the first film, who died four months before it came out.

It received generally favorable reviews from critics. A sequel, titled Sicario: Capos, is in development.

== Plot ==
A suicide bombing by ISIS in a Kansas City grocery store kills 15 people. In response, the U.S. government orders CIA officer Matt Graver to apply extreme measures to combat Mexican drug cartels who are suspected of having smuggled the terrorists across the Mexico–United States border. Graver and the Department of Defense decide the best option is to instigate a war between the major cartels, and Graver recruits operative Alejandro Gillick for the mission. Graver also meets with private military company boss Andy Wheeldon to procure mercenaries, helicopters, and encrypted communication equipment for the U.S. to maintain plausible deniability while combating the Mexican cartels.

Gillick assassinates a high-profile lawyer of the Matamoros cartel in Mexico City while Graver and his team kidnap Isabel Reyes, the daughter of Carlos Reyes (kingpin of the Sonoran cartel, rivals of the Matamoros), in a false flag operation.

Graver, Gillick, and their team take Isabel to a safe house in Texas and stage a DEA raid pretending to rescue her from the Matamoros cartel. They take her to an American military base while the team organizes her return to Mexico. They plan to leave her behind in a Mexican Federal Police depot located inside territory controlled by her father's rivals to escalate the inter-cartel conflict further. However, after they cross into Mexico, the corrupt police escort turns against them and attacks the American Humvees. In the firefight that ensues, Graver and his team kill 25 Mexican policemen to escape the ambush. The dead policemen become mainstream news.

Amidst the chaos, Isabel, who realizes that Graver's team may have been behind her abduction, tries to escape and runs away into the desert. Gillick goes after her alone while the rest of the team returns to the U.S. Meanwhile, the American government determines that at least two of the suicide bombers in Kansas City were domestic terrorists, not foreign nationals, and thus were not smuggled into the U.S. by the cartels. To quell tensions with Mexico, the United States Secretary of Defense orders the CIA to abandon the mission. Learning that Isabel witnessed the Americans shooting the Mexican police, the Secretary orders the team to erase all proof of American involvement by killing Isabel and Gillick. Graver, in turn, warns Gillick and orders him to kill Isabel, but Gillick refuses and turns rogue to keep her alive. Gillick and Isabel find shelter at an isolated farm in the desert for the night. Gillick knows that if they stay in Mexico, Isabel will be killed. With few resources, they disguise themselves as illegal immigrants and pay human traffickers to help them re-enter the U.S. Graver and his team fly covertly into Mexico by helicopter, tracking a GPS device that Gillick has activated and embedded into Isabel's shoe.

At the point of departure for the border, Miguel, a young Mexican American who has been recruited as a coyote, recognizes Gillick from an encounter in a Texas parking lot two days earlier. He alerts his boss, who takes Gillick and Isabel hostage. As a gang initiation, Miguel is forced to shoot a hooded Gillick in the head, leaving him for dead. Upset, Miguel later abandons the gang and walks off by himself. Graver, having witnessed the apparent killing of Gillick via satellite imaging, tracks down and eliminates the Mexican gang. They find Isabel, and defying his orders, Graver decides to bring her to the U.S. and place her in witness protection. Meanwhile, Gillick regains consciousness, having been shot through the cheek. A gang search party chases him, but he kills its members by throwing a grenade into the pursuing car.

One year later, a now heavily gang-tattooed Miguel is in the Texas mall where he first saw Gillick. He enters the office of his gang contact, but instead finds Gillick waiting for him. Gillick says to a dumbfounded and intimidated Miguel: "So you want to be a sicario? Let's talk about your future."

== Cast ==
- Benicio del Toro as Alejandro Gillick, a former Mexican prosecutor turned assassin for the CIA and the Medellín cartel
- Josh Brolin as Matt Graver, CIA SAC/SOG officer
- Isabela Merced as Isabel Reyes, the daughter of Carlos Reyes, a powerful Mexican drug lord and Alejandro Gillick's archenemy
- Jeffrey Donovan as Steve Forsing, CIA SAC/SOG officer and ex-Delta Force operator
- Manuel Garcia-Rulfo as Gallo, a human trafficker.
- Matthew Modine as Secretary of Defense James Riley
- Catherine Keener as Cynthia Foards, Matt's Superior in the CIA
- Shea Whigham as Andy Wheeldon, the head of a private military company.
- Elijah Rodriguez as Miguel Hernandez, an American teen who works as a coyote
- Howard Ferguson Jr. as Troy
- David Castañeda as Hector
- Jacqueline Torres as Blandina
- Raoul Trujillo as Rafael
- Bruno Bichir as Angel
- Jake Picking as Shawn
- Arturo Maese Bernal as Gallo's thug
- Ian Bohen as Carson Willis
- Faysal Ahmed as Bashiir
- Graham Beckel as Dale Hammonds

== Production ==
=== Development ===
In September 2015, Lionsgate commissioned a sequel to Sicario, centering on Benicio del Toro's character. The project was being overseen by the writer Taylor Sheridan, with Denis Villeneuve initially involved. In April 2016, producers Molly Smith and Trent Luckinbill said Emily Blunt, del Toro and Josh Brolin would return. By June 1, 2016, Italian director Stefano Sollima had been hired to direct what was now titled Soldado from a script by Sheridan. On October 27, 2016, Catherine Keener was cast in the film, which Lionsgate and Black Label Media financed, and which was produced by Thunder Road's Basil Iwanyk, Black Label's Molly Smith and Thad and Trent Luckinbill, and Edward McDonnell. By November 2016, Blunt was no longer attached. The following month, Isabela Merced, David Castaneda and Manuel Garcia-Rulfo joined the cast. Jeffrey Donovan, who returned as Steve Forsing, said that the story would focus on Forsing, Gillick and Graver "going down into Mexico to basically start a war, on purpose, between the rival Mexican cartels," and described the film as a "stand-alone spin-off" rather than a sequel or prequel. In January 2017, Elijah Rodriguez, Matthew Modine and Ian Bohen also joined the cast. Sheridan said, "If Sicario is a film about the militarization of police and that blending over, [Soldado] is removing the policing aspect from it."

=== Filming ===
Principal photography on the film began in New Mexico on November 8, 2016, and then it was shot in Mexico City and Tijuana, Baja California.

=== Music ===
Hildur Guðnadóttir composed the score for the film, after collaborating with Jóhann Jóhannsson on the first film as a cello soloist. The soundtrack was released by Varese Sarabande Records.

== Release ==
The film was originally set to be released by Lionsgate in the United States, under the title Soldado, but, however, in April 2017, Sony Pictures signed a multi-year distribution deal with Black Label Media, which saw the North American and a few international distribution rights change to Sony Pictures Releasing through Columbia Pictures, who then changed the title to Sicario 2: Soldado (which is the British title) and then thereafter to Sicario: Day of the Soldado, in the North American market, after Lionsgate had a disagreement with the production company. Sony Pictures distributed the film in the United States, Canada, Latin America, South Africa and Spain as well as Spanish-speaking Andorra, while Lionsgate distributed it in the United Kingdom and Ireland, as well as handling international rights to other independent distributors. In August 2017, Sony set the release date for June 29, 2018.

=== Marketing ===
On December 19, 2017, the first trailer was released. The second trailer debuted on March 19, 2018, confirming the new title as Sicario: Day of the Soldado. The film was released outside North America under the title Sicario 2: Soldado in some locations, and in Italy, the Philippines and others keeping the initial title of Soldado.

== Reception ==
=== Box office ===
Sicario: Day of the Soldado grossed $50.1 million in the United States and Canada, and $25.7 million in other territories, for a total worldwide gross of $75.8 million. The studio has stated the production budget was $35 million, although Deadline Hollywood reported the film cost as high as $45 million before prints and advertising.

In the United States and Canada, Day of the Soldado was released alongside Uncle Drew, and was initially projected to gross around $12 million from 3,055 theaters in its opening weekend. After making $7.5 million on its first day (including $2 million from Thursday night previews), estimates were raised to $19 million. Its debut was ultimately $19.1 million, an improvement over the $12.1 million the first film took in during its wide expansion, and third at the box office that weekend, behind other sequels such as Jurassic World: Fallen Kingdom and Incredibles 2. It fell 61% in its second weekend, to $7.3 million, finishing fifth at the box office.

=== Critical response ===
On review aggregation website Rotten Tomatoes, Sicario: Day of the Soldado holds an approval rating of 62% based on 290 reviews, with an average rating of 6.3/10. The website's critical consensus reads, "Though less subversive than its predecessor, Sicario: Day of the Soldado succeeds as a stylish, dynamic thriller—even if its amoral machismo makes for grim viewing." On Metacritic, the film has a weighted average score of 61 out of 100, based on 50 critics, indicating "generally favorable reviews". Audiences polled by CinemaScore gave the film an average grade of "B" on an A+ to F scale, down from the first film's "A−".

Variety's Peter Debruge called the film "tense, tough, and shockingly ruthless at times," and wrote, "Soldado may not be as masterful as Villeneuve's original, but it sets up a world of possibilities for elaborating on a complex conflict far too rich to be resolved in two hours." Todd McCarthy of The Hollywood Reporter praised the film as a "worthy, rough-and-tough sequel", highlighting the direction, lead performances and Sheridan's script, and saying "Sicario: Day of the Soldado emerges as a dynamic action drama in its own right."

Darren Franich of Entertainment Weekly gave the film a 'B' rating, praising the performance of Del Toro while criticizing the plot, stating: "Alejandro (played by Del Toro) assassinates a cartel functionary in broad daylight... He executes the man, firing his gun exactly 417 times. So Sicario 2 is junk, but it's terrifically stylish junk. Director Stefano Solima has worked in Italian crime thrillers, and he brings run-and-gun humanity to this, suggesting complexities of border society where the first film defaulted to moody hellscapery". Time magazine's Stephanie Zacharek found the film to be adequate, though lacking the presence of a character in the sequel as emotive as the one played by Emily Blunt in the original, stating: "There's not a Blunt in sight, though special task force macho men Matt Graver and Alejandro... return. This time their job is to stir up a war between rival Mexican drug cartels; part of the scheme involves kidnapping a drug lord's scrappy teenage daughter. Although she has enough teen-beat orneriness to kick both Matt's and Alejandro's butts, the movie doesn't let her." In an opinion piece for NBC News, Ani Bundel called the film "as implausible as it is irresponsible" and criticized the use of negative stereotypes, concluding that the film "is the worst kind of propaganda, in that it probably doesn't even realize just how harmful it is." Monica Castillo at IndieWire describes the first film as an unsympathetic portrayal of Mexicans, and compares the sequel to state-sanctioned propaganda, decrying the "xenophobic absurdity" of it.

== Future ==
In June 2018, before the release of Soldado, producer Trent Luckinbill stated that a third film was in development. In January 2021, it was noted that the producers hoped to start filming of a third installment in the spring or summer of that year. It was revealed that the third film is going to be named Sicario: Capos. In February 2021, producer Molly Smith said the film was still in development. In September 2023, it was reported that a script was being written before the 2023 Writers Guild of America strike, with writers ready to continue whenever the strike should end. In late October 2023, Christopher McQuarrie was confirmed to be involved in the third film, with producers saying the script was nearly complete. GQ magazine renewed rumors of the start of casting and storyline development in 2023 and there was more speculation in 2024. In August 2026, Josh Brolin confirmed that the third film was still in development with production starting "soon".

As of October 2026, it is confirmed that the sequel will be directed by Padraic McKinley and will be written by Steven Knight. The initial cast of the first film of Emily Blunt, Josh Brolin, and Bencio Del Toro have also been confirmed to return for the third installment.

== See also ==
- Mexico–United States relations
- Coyote (person)
- List of films featuring the deaf and hard of hearing
- Sicario (2015 film)
