= Sicario (2015 film) =

2015 American film by Denis Villeneuve

- Theatrical release poster
- Directed by: Denis Villeneuve
- Written by: Taylor Sheridan
- Produced by: Basil Iwanyk; Edward L. McDonnell; Molly Smith; Thad Luckinbill; Trent Luckinbill
- Starring: Emily Blunt; Benicio del Toro; Josh Brolin; Daniel Kaluuya
- Cinematography: Roger Deakins
- Edited by: Joe Walker
- Music by: Jóhann Jóhannsson
- Production companies: Black Label Media; Thunder Road
- Distributed by: Lionsgate
- Release dates: May 19, 2015 (Cannes); September 18, 2015 (United States)
- Running time: 121 minutes
- Country: United States
- Languages: English; Spanish
- Budget: $30 million
- Box office: $85 million

Sicario is a 2015 American action crime thriller film directed by Denis Villeneuve, written by Taylor Sheridan in his screenwriting debut and starring Emily Blunt, Benicio del Toro, and Josh Brolin. The film follows a principled FBI special agent who is enlisted by a government task force to bring down the leader of a powerful and brutal Mexican drug cartel. Sicario was selected to compete for the Palme d'Or at the 2015 Cannes Film Festival. It began a limited release in the United States on September 18, 2015, followed by a nationwide release on October 2, 2015.

Sicario received praise for its cast performances, writing, direction, musical score and cinematography. The film was nominated for Best Cinematography, Best Original Score, and Best Sound Editing at the 88th Academy Awards. It also earned BAFTA nominations for Best Supporting Actor, Best Cinematography, and Best Film Music. Its sequel, Sicario: Day of the Soldado, directed by Stefano Sollima, was released on June 29, 2018. A third film, titled Sicario: Capos, is in development.

The film is the first installment of writer Taylor Sheridan's American Frontier Trilogy, preceding Hell or High Water and Wind River.

== Plot ==
In Chandler, Arizona, FBI special agents Kate Macer and Reggie Wayne lead a raid on a Sonora Cartel safe house, where they discover dozens of decaying corpses hidden in the walls. Outside, an explosive booby trap kills two police officers. Following the raid, Kate is recommended for and joins a joint task force overseen by CIA/SAD officer Matt Graver and the secretive Alejandro Gillick, a Mexican prosecutor turned CIA-trained assassin. Their mission is to flush out and apprehend Sonoran lieutenant Manuel Díaz, currently operating and hiding in the United States.

The team, which includes Delta Force operators, Deputy US Marshals, and CIA personnel, travels to Ciudad Juárez, Mexico, to extradite Díaz's brother, Guillermo. While crossing the El Paso–Juárez border, the team runs into low-level cartel hitmen, whom the Americans swiftly kill. During the gunfight, Kate is forced to kill a Federal Police officer in self-defense, and is left visibly horrified by the violence. Back in the U.S., Alejandro tortures Guillermo and learns that the cartel uses a tunnel near Nogales, Sonora, to smuggle drugs. Meanwhile, Kate confronts Matt, who reveals that the real mission is to disrupt Díaz's drug operations so he can lead them to his boss, drug lord Fausto Alarcón. Unnerved, Kate asks Reggie to join her for support.

The task force raids a bank used to launder Díaz's money. After finding financial evidence, Kate and Reggie want to file a lawsuit against Díaz but are ordered to stand down to avoid jeopardizing the operation. At a bar, Reggie introduces Kate to Ted, a Phoenix Police officer. Kate and Ted become intimate at her apartment, but she realizes Ted is working with the cartel. In the ensuing struggle, Ted begins to strangle Kate before Alejandro appears and subdues him. Alejandro and Matt brutally beat and threaten Ted to coerce him into revealing the names of other officers working for Díaz.

After the team learns that Díaz has been recalled to Mexico, they prepare to raid the tunnel near Nogales. Matt reveals to Kate and Reggie that their involvement is a technical necessity as the CIA is not allowed to operate alone within U.S. borders. An angered Reggie tells Kate they should leave, but she insists on staying to learn about the mission's true purpose. As a gunfight with the cartel begins, Kate follows Alejandro into Mexico. She sees him abduct Silvio, a corrupt Sonoran police officer working as one of Díaz's drug mules. Kate attempts to arrest Alejandro, but he shoots her twice in her Kevlar vest to subdue her, angrily telling her to never point a gun at him again, before driving away with Silvio at gunpoint.

On the U.S. side of the border, Kate confronts Matt, who explains the mission is part of a broader operation to revert the various drug cartels to a single Colombian-run business that the U.S. can more easily control and work with. Alejandro was hired to assassinate Alarcón, the man responsible for ordering the murder of Alejandro's wife and daughter when he was a prosecutor in Juárez. Alejandro kills Silvio after he stops Díaz's vehicle and forces Díaz to drive to Alarcón's estate. On arrival, he quickly kills Díaz and Alarcón's guards; finding the family seated to dinner, he vengefully kills Alarcón's wife and two sons first and then kills Alarcón.

The next day, Alejandro appears in Kate's apartment and forces her at gunpoint to sign a statement attesting that the entire operation was legal. As he leaves, she aims her pistol at him, and Alejandro turns to face her, but she cannot bring herself to pull the trigger. In Nogales, Silvio's widow watches her son's soccer game, which is briefly interrupted by the sound of distant machine-gun fire.

== Cast ==
- Emily Blunt as Kate Macer, an FBI Special Agent
- Benicio del Toro as Alejandro Gillick, a former Mexican prosecutor turned assassin
- Josh Brolin as Matt Graver, a CIA SAD/SOG officer
- Daniel Kaluuya as Reggie Wayne, a rookie FBI Special Agent and Kate's partner
- Victor Garber as FBI Special Agent in Charge (SAC) Dave Jennings
- Jon Bernthal as Ted, a Phoenix PD cop
- Jeffrey Donovan as Steve Forsing, a CIA SAC/SOG officer and ex-Delta Force operator
- Raoul Trujillo as Rafael, Mexican police official
- Julio Cesar Cedillo as Fausto Alarcón, a notorious Sonora Cartel drug lord and the man responsible for killing Alejandro's family
- Hank Rogerson as Phil Coopers
- Bernardo Saracino as Manuel Díaz, a senior Sonora Cartel lieutenant and cousin of Alarcón
- Maximiliano Hernández as Silvio, a Mexican Sonora State Police officer
- Edgar Arreola as Guillermo, brother of Manuel Díaz

== Production ==
=== Development ===
In December 2013, it was announced that Denis Villeneuve would direct a Mexican border drama, Sicario, from a screenplay by Taylor Sheridan. It is the first installment in Sheridan's neo-western trilogy exploring crime on "the modern-day American frontier". Black Label Media financed and co-produced with Thunder Road Pictures. Basil Iwanyk produced the film along with Molly Smith, Trent Luckinbill, and Thad Luckinbill.

Emily Blunt became involved with the film in April 2014, shortly followed by Benicio del Toro. Jon Bernthal and Josh Brolin joined the film in May, and cinematographer Roger Deakins was also hired. Daniel Kaluuya, Maximiliano Hernández, and Jeffrey Donovan were then cast, and Jóhann Jóhannsson was hired to compose the film's musical score in August 2014.

=== Filming ===
Principal photography began on June 30, 2014, in Albuquerque, New Mexico, with additional scenes filmed in Ciudad Nezahualcóyotl, just east of Mexico City.

== Music ==
Jóhann Jóhannsson was selected to write and compose the score for the film, making Sicario his second collaboration with director Denis Villeneuve after having worked together on Prisoners which was released in 2013.

== Release ==
=== Theatrical ===
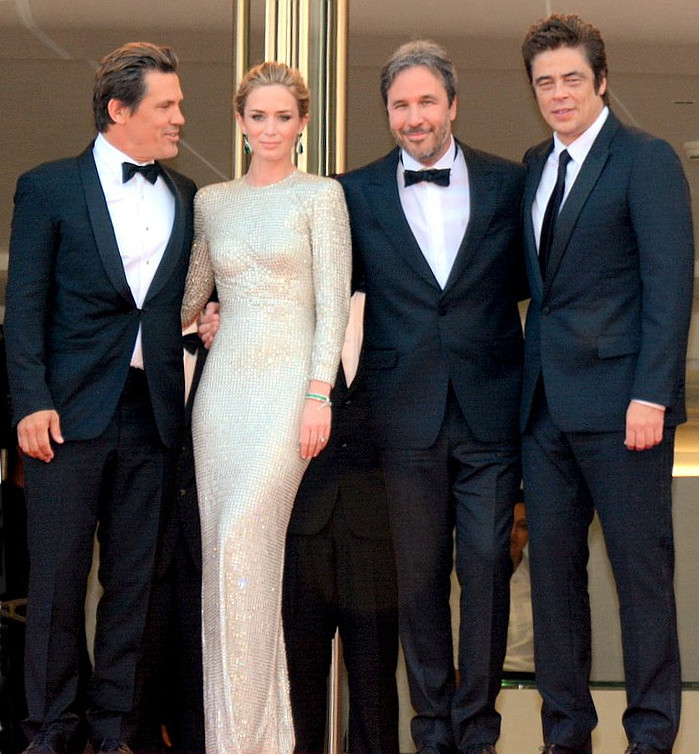
Josh Brolin, Emily Blunt, Villeneuve, and Benicio del Toro at the 2015 Cannes Film Festival premiere of Sicario

In May 2014, Lionsgate acquired the U.S. rights to the film, while Lionsgate International handled the foreign sales with Disney's Buena Vista International distributing the movie in Russia as the first film in an output deal with Lionsgate. On February 23, 2015, Lionsgate set the film for a limited release in the United States on September 18, 2015, and a wide release on October 2, 2015. The film had its world premiere at the 2015 Cannes Film Festival on May 19, 2015. It was then selected to be shown in the Special Presentations section of the 2015 Toronto International Film Festival on September 11, 2015.

=== Home media ===
Sicario was released on Blu-ray and DVD on January 5, 2016, and on 4K UHD Blu-ray on March 1, 2016.

== Reception ==
Before the film's release, the mayor of Ciudad Juárez, Enrique Serrano Escobar, urged citizens to boycott it, believing the film presented a false and negative image of the city. He said the violence depicted in the film was accurate until about 2010, and that the city had since made progress in restoring peace.

=== Box office ===
Sicario grossed $46.9 million in the United States and Canada, and $38 million in other territories, for a worldwide total of $84.9 million, against a production budget of $30 million.

Released alongside The Martian and The Walk, Sicario was projected to make $8–10 million in its wide release opening weekend. On its first day, the film grossed $4.3 million. In its opening weekend, it grossed $12.1 million, exceeding expectations, and finished behind The Martian and Hotel Transylvania 2. In the second weekend the film made $7.6 million, dropping 38% and finishing fifth.

=== Critical response ===
On Rotten Tomatoes, the film has an approval rating of 91% based on 279 reviews, with an average rating of 8.10/10. The site's critical consensus reads: "Led by outstanding work from Emily Blunt and Benicio del Toro, Sicario is a taut, tightly wound thriller with much more on its mind than attention-getting set pieces." On Metacritic, the film has a weighted average score of 82 out of 100, based on 48 reviews, indicating "universal acclaim". Audiences polled by CinemaScore gave the film an average grade of "A−" on an A+ to F scale.

Richard Roeper gave the film an A, calling it one of the year's best, and applauded del Toro's performance, saying: "...then there's del Toro, who lurks about the fringes of the action for most of the story, and then springs into action in a handful of scenes in a variety of ways that will leave you shaken—and grateful to have seen such beautifully dark work." Dan Jolin from Empire magazine gave the film 5 stars, calling it "a beautifully murky, hard-edged thriller. Quite simply, one of the best films of the year."

Peter Bradshaw of The Guardian praised the acting of Emily Blunt, Benicio del Toro, and Josh Brolin. He stated that although her character Kate Macer was implausible, Emily Blunt "brazens out any possible absurdity with great acting focus and front". Chris Ryan of Grantland compared Sicario with the 1979 film Apocalypse Now directed by Francis Ford Coppola, noting an analogy between the former's themes with respect to the Mexican drug war and the latter's with respect to the Vietnam War. He also stated that the characters Alejandro Gillick and Matt Graver in Sicario resemble those of Colonel Walter E. Kurtz and Lieutenant Colonel William Kilgore, respectively, from Apocalypse Now.

Mark Kermode said, "What makes this work is that Emily Blunt is terrific, and Benicio del Toro has this eye-catching appearance as a riddle and an enigma... and that the film is very, very well directed."

In 2025, it was one of the films voted for the "Readers' Choice" edition of The New York Times' list of "The 100 Best Movies of the 21st Century," finishing at number 119.

=== Top ten lists ===
Sicario was listed on many critics' top ten lists.

- 1st – Adam Chitwood, Collider.com
- 2nd – Mike D'Angelo, The A.V. Club
- 2nd – Chris Nashawaty, Entertainment Weekly
- 2nd – Micah Mertes, Omaha World-Herald
- 3rd – Josh Kupecki, Austin Chronicle
- 3rd – Rob Hunter, Film School Rejects
- 3rd – Jack Giroux, /Film
- 3rd – Erik McClanahan & Rodrigo Perez, Indiewire
- 4th – Steven Boone, RogerEbert.com
- 4th – Jeff Cannata, /Film
- 4th – Steve Persall, Tampa Bay Times
- 4th – Kyle Smith, New York Post
- 5th – Christoper Orr, The Atlantic
- 5th – Rene Rodriguez, Miami Herald
- 5th – Ben Travers, Indiewire
- 5th – Joshua Rothkopf, Time Out New York
- 5th – Kiko Martinez, San Antonio Current
- 6th – Richard Roeper, Chicago Sun-Times
- 6th – Katie Rife, The A.V. Club
- 6th – Wired
- 6th – David Chen & Devindra Hardawar, /Film
- 6th – James Berardinelli, Reelviews
- 6th – Troy L. Smith, Cleveland Plain Dealer
- 7th – Perri Nemiroff, Collider.com
- 7th – Glenn Lovell, CinemaDope
- 5th – Nicholas Laskin, Indiewire
- 9th – Alynda Wheat, People
- 9th – Ignatiy Vishnevetsky, The A.V. Club
- 9th – MTV
- 9th – Jeffrey M. Anderson, San Francisco Examiner
- Top 10 (listed alphabetically, not ranked) – Bill Stamets & Katherine Tulich, RogerEbert.com

=== Accolades ===
Among other accolades, the film received three Academy Award nominations, for Best Cinematography, Best Original Score, and Best Sound Editing.

== Sequels ==
Lionsgate commissioned a sequel centering on del Toro's character, subtitled Soldado. The project was overseen by writer Taylor Sheridan. In April 2016, producers Molly Smith and Trent Luckinbill said del Toro and Brolin would return. In June 2016, Italian filmmaker Stefano Sollima was hired to direct, with Villeneuve no longer available due to scheduling conflicts. Principal photography began on November 8, 2016, in New Mexico. Sicario: Day of the Soldado was released in the United States on June 29, 2018, to generally positive reviews.

The third film, titled Sicario: Capos, was announced prior to release of the second film, and in February 2021, producer Molly Smith said it was still in development. GQ magazine renewed rumours of the start of casting and storyline development in 2023 and there was more speculation in 2024.

In an interview with Screen Rant, Josh Brolin has confirmed that the third installment is "happening" and will begin production "soon."

According to Deadline, the sequel will be directed by Padraic McKinley with a script written by Steven Knight. In addition, Emily Blunt, Josh Brolin and Bencio Del Toro are confirmed to return to the series.
