= Yuri Buzzi =

Italian actor and writer (born 1978)

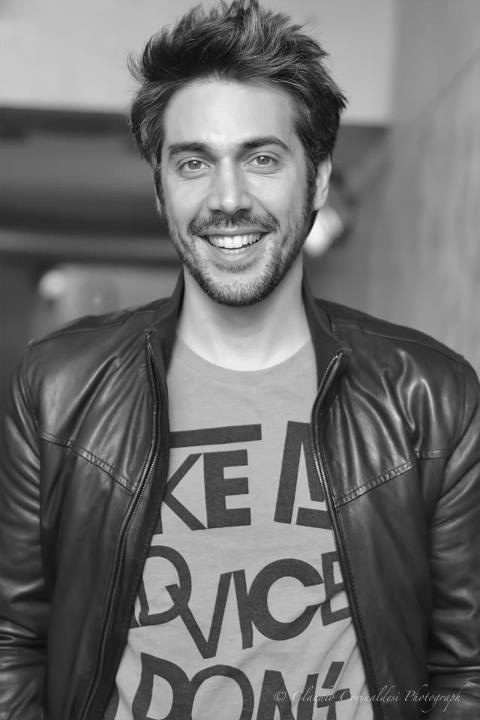
- Born: September 26, 1978 (age 48)
- Citizenship: Italy
- Website: Official website

Yuri Buzzi (born 26 September 1978) is an Italian actor.

Born in Vigevano, he debuted in 2005 in the TV series Il giudice Mastrangelo. Six years later, he decided against accepting an opportunity to work in theatre, choosing instead to study at The Actors Studio.

He subsequently worked with numerous directors such as Paul Feig in the movie Spy (2015 film) produced by 20th Century Fox; Jordan Scott, Peter Thwaites worldwide campaign for Martini & Rossi produced by Gorgeous (film), Angelo Longoni in the movie Tiberio Mitri - il campione e la miss, Luca Lucini (Oggi sposi), Alessandro D'Alatri advertising campaign for Telecom Italia.

In 2011, he replaced George Clooney as a Worldwide Martini Ambassador for Martini & Rossi. As a model he had the opportunity to work with the International model David Gandy and the designer Christian Louboutin during the launch of the Martini & Rossi Worldwide campaign at the Design Museum in London. In 2013, he won Best Actor at the Dino De Laurentiis Film Festival for is performance in the movie Bibliothèque. He has latterly appeared in Emily in Paris (2024) and A Taste for Murder (2025).

His first book, "My life on a cactus", a collection of 32 poems and a monologue for theatre, was published in 2008 by Casa editrice Giuseppe Laterza & figli

== Filmography ==
- Il giudice Mastrangelo (2005)
- Gio (2008)
- Oggi sposi (2009)
- Il campione e la miss (2011)
- Bibliothèque (2013)
- Spy (2014)
- Emily in Paris (2024)
- A Taste for Murder (2025)
- Missing the Boat (2026)

== Awards and recognitions ==
Best actor Dino De Laurentiis Film Festival.
