= ACAB – All Cops Are Bastards =

2012 Italian drama film

- Directed by: Stefano Sollima
- Screenplay by: Barbara Petronio; Daniele Cesarano; Leonardo Valenti
- Based on: ACAB by Carlo Bonini
- Produced by: Marco Chimenz; Giovanni Stabilini; Riccardo Tozzi
- Starring: Pierfrancesco Favino; Filippo Nigro; Marco Giallini; Andrea Sartoretti; Domenico Diele
- Cinematography: Paolo Carnera
- Edited by: Patrizio Marone
- Music by: Mokadelic
- Production companies: Cattleya; Babe Film; Rai Cinema
- Distributed by: 01 Distribution
- Release date: 25 January 2012 (Italy)
- Running time: 112 minutes
- Country: Italy
- Language: Italian

ACAB – All Cops Are Bastards is a 2012 Italian drama film directed by Stefano Sollima.

== Plot ==
The film focuses on the life of a group of riot control force policemen, the Celerini, and their life in Rome "cleansing" stadiums of Ultras, public demonstrations, evictions and everyday family life.

A new recruit, Adriano Costantini, joins the squad for its "high-paying" salary, which he needs to support his mother. The two of them live in a small apartment from which they'll soon be evicted and, even though they had been assigned public housing, an immigrant family has been squatting in it and it is therefore uninhabitable.

Adriano is prone to violence and often prefers the use of force even in situations where it is unnecessary, additionally fueled by the anger he feels over his mother's situation.

Mazinga is the leader of the squad and father of a rebellious teenager who starts to hang out with a neo-fascist group and is embarrassed by his father's job. Mazinga gets stabbed during a confrontation at the stadium and loses control of one of his legs, prompting a manhunt for the culprit from his colleagues.

Negro, another member of the group, is going through a difficult divorce and is denied visitations with his daughter.

Cobra is the most dedicated member of the team. He believes in protecting his "brothers" in arms above anything else, no matter the errors they may have committed. He believes in the job he's doing but sometimes the lines between protecting his fellow policemen and respecting the law get blurred. He may be one of the most violent members of the squad, also facing trial for beating a supporter during a football match.

The lives of those four men unravel throughout the movie, while in the background the tensions between the police force, the Ultras, the immigrants and the fascists reach their peak.

== Cast ==
- Pierfrancesco Favino: Cobra, group frontman
- Filippo Nigro: Negro
- Marco Giallini: Mazinga, an injured policeman
- Andrea Sartoretti (actor): Carletto, former agent
- Domenico Diele: Adriano
- Roberta Spagnuolo: Maria
- Livio Beshir: Mustafà
- Nick Nicolosi: school headmaster
- Alessandro Procoli: Mosque leader
- Alessandro Sanguigni: Cameo

== Production ==
The film was the debut feature of director Stefano Sollima, who had previously directed the TV crime series Romanzo criminale - La serie.

== Music ==
The music was composed and performed by the Italian post-rock band Mokadelic and was recorded entirely at the famous Forum Music Village studios in Rome. The soundtrack contains 80's and modern rock hits like "Seven Nation Army" by The White Stripes, "A.C.A.B." by The 4-Skins, "Where Is My Mind?" by Pixies, "Police On My Back" by The Clash, "New Dawn Fades" by Joy Division and "Snow" by The Chemical Brothers.

== Critical response ==
Variety called it "slick, with a driving rhythm and plenty of action", but was troubled by the way it celebrated sadism and vigilantism. Cinealliance likewise found it powerful, with an intelligent and story effective direction, and despite fascist overtones. Filmosphere gave it 3.5/5.

== Awards and nominations ==
- 2012 – David di Donatello
  - Nomination David di Donatello for Best New Director to Stefano Sollima
  - Nomination David di Donatello for Best Supporting Actor to Marco Giallini
  - Nomination David di Donatello for Best Cinematography to Paolo Carnera
  - Nomination David di Donatello for Best Make-up to Manlio Rocchetti
  - Nomination David di Donatello for Best Editing to Patrizio Marone
  - Nomination David di Donatello for Best Sound to Gilberto Martinelli

== See also ==
- Public Disorder
