= Fatima Trotta =

Italian actress, comedian and television presenter

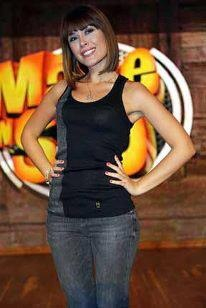
- Born: 2 July 1986 (age 39); Naples, Italy
- Occupation: Actress

Fatima Trotta (born 2 July 1986) is an Italian actress, comedian and television presenter.

== Life and career ==
Born in Naples, as a child, Trotta participated in several beauty pageants, and at a young age she worked in a Neapolitan free channel TV program hosted by Maria Teresa Ruta. After appearing in the Rai 1 talent show I Raccomandati in 2005, she made her professional debut as an actress in the Rai 3 TV series Un Posto al Sole.

From 2009 Trotta is the presenter of the variety show Made in Sud, first broadcast on Comedy Central and later on Rai 2.
