= Carla Porta Musa =

Italian supercentenarian, essayist and poet (1902–2012)

- Born: 15 March 1902; Como, Lombardy, Italy
- Died: 12 October 2012 (aged 110 years, 209 days); Como Lombardy, Italy
- Occupations: Essayist, poet
- Spouse: Giovanni Porta
- Children: Livia Porta
- Parent(s): Enrico Musa; Maria Casella

Carla Porta Musa (15 March 1902 – 10 October 2012) was an Italian supercentenarian, essayist and poet.

== Life and career ==
Musa was born in Como, Italy, to Maria Casella and Enrico Musa, a well known engineer in Milan. Her passion for books started on her sixth birthday when her father gave her a small library which she shared with her three siblings. She studied in Lausanne, Switzerland, Bushey, United Kingdom, and Paris, France.

Musa died from pneumonia complications at Valduce Hospital in Como, on 10 October 2012, aged 110 years, 209 days.

== Partial bibliography ==
- Le tre zitelle, 2010
- Villa Elisabetta, 2008
- Lasciati prender per mano, 2007
- La ribelle incatenata, 2005
- Nel segno di Chiara, 1998
- Il cielo nel cuore, 1997
- Il suo cane ciao e altre storie, 1995
- Le stagioni di Chiara, 1994
- Il tuo cuore e il mio, 1992
- Lampi al magnesio, 1991
- La luna di traverso, 1965
- Il cortile, 1961
- Storia di Peter, 1960
- Girometta e Pampacoca, 1960
- La breve estate, 1959
- Liberata, 1958
- Virginia 1880, 1955
- Quaderno rosso, 1954
- Nuovi momenti lirici, 1953
- Momenti Lirici, 1950
