= Francesco Montanari (actor) =

Italian actor (born 1984)

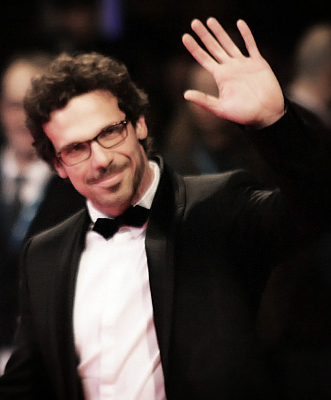
- Francesco Montanari (2010)
- Born: 4 October 1984 (age 41); Rome, Italy
- Education: Accademia Nazionale di Arte Drammatica Silvio D'Amico
- Occupation: Actor

Francesco Montanari (born 4 October 1984) is an Italian actor.

== Early life ==
Montanari graduated from the Accademia Nazionale di Arte Drammatica Silvio D'Amico.

== Career ==
He appeared in student director Jacopo Bezzi's I bambini di sale ("Children of Salt") and then became known for his portrayal of Il Libanese ("The Lebanese") in the TV series Romanzo Criminale ("Criminal Novel"), a TV series inspired by the true story of the Banda della Magliana, an Italian criminal organisation.

He played Attilio Panecci in the 2009 film Oggi sposi ("Just Married"). He also played Girolamo Savonarola in the third season of Medici: the Magnificent, the spin-off of the Medici: Masters of Florence (2016).

== Filmography ==
=== Film ===
Year	Title	Role(s)	Notes
2009	Oggi sposi	Attilio Panecci	
2010	Chimères absentes	Zanko	Short film
2011	All at Sea	Gigi	
2011	The Last Fashion Show	Inspector Vincenzo Malerba	
2012	Tell No One	Giacomo / Alba Pailettes	
2012	Ce l'hai un minuto?	Madhi	Short film
2014	Un Natale stupefacente	Belotti	
2015	La settima onda	Tanino	
2015	Mala Vita	Rocco	
2016	In bici senza sella	Young Yuppy	
2016	Radice di 9	Vincenzo	Short film
2016	Sun, Heart, Love	Mario	
2017	Ovunque tu sarai	Giordano	
2017	La verità	Gabriele Manetti	
2019	Dolceroma	Raul Ventura	
2019	My Ira	Italian king	Short film
2020	La volta buona	Rosario	
2020	Regina	Luigi	
2021	Appunti di un venditore di donne	Lucio	
2022	Ero in guerra ma non lo sapevo	Pierluigi Torregiani	
2022	Hill of Vision	Luciano Capecchi	

=== Television ===
Year	Title	Role(s)	Notes
2008–2010	Romanzo criminale	Il Libanese	Lead role
2012	eBand	Mike	Episode: "Despicable Mick"
2013	Squadra antimafia	Achille Ferro	Main role (season 5)
2015	Questo è il mio paese	Corrado Greco	Main role
2016	Boris Giuliano - Un poliziotto a Palermo	Marco Alliati	Television movie
2018–2021	Cacciatore: The Hunter	Saverio Barone	Lead role
2019	Medici	Girolamo Savonarola	Main role (season 3)
2022	Il grande gioco	Corso Manni	Lead role
2025	Maschi Veri	Riccardo	Lead role

== Personal life ==
He married Andrea Delogu in 2016.
