= 33 Giri =

- Directed by: Riccardo Di Gerlando
- Written by: Riccardo Di Gerlando
- Produced by: Sanremo Cinema
- Starring: Marco Pingiotti; Massimo Botti
- Cinematography: Simone Caridi
- Music by: Matteo Consoli
- Release date: 30 June 2012
- Running time: 10 minutes
- Country: Italy
- Language: Italian

33 Giri is a 2012 Italian dramatic short film directed by Riccardo Di Gerlando.

== Synopsis ==
A man with Down syndrome dreams of reviving his dead mother.

== Awards ==
33 Giri has been screened in over 30 film festivals worldwide. It won or was selected in the following festivals:

- Best Short Movie Kalat Nissa International Film Festival – Caltanissetta (Italia)
- Best Short Movie Festival del Cinema Indipendente SGUARDI – Cles (Trento, Italia)
- Best Short Movie Sociale Capua Cine Art – Capua (Caserta, Italia)
- Miglior Linguaggio Filmico Gold Elephant World International Film Festival – Catania (Italia)
- Best Short Movie Sociale Palagiano in Corto – (Taranto, Puglia)
- Filmmaker Award No Fear Film Festival – Salt Lake City (Utah, USA)
- Selection David di Donatello 2013
- Official Selection Golden Palmera Film Festival – (Dubai)
- Official Selection 21st International Festival of Local Televisions – Kosice (Slovacchia)
- Official Selection Entr'2 Marches International Film Festival - Cannes (France)
- Official Selection Sprout Film Festival – New York City (New York, USA)
