= Guglielmo Scilla =

Italian actor and writer

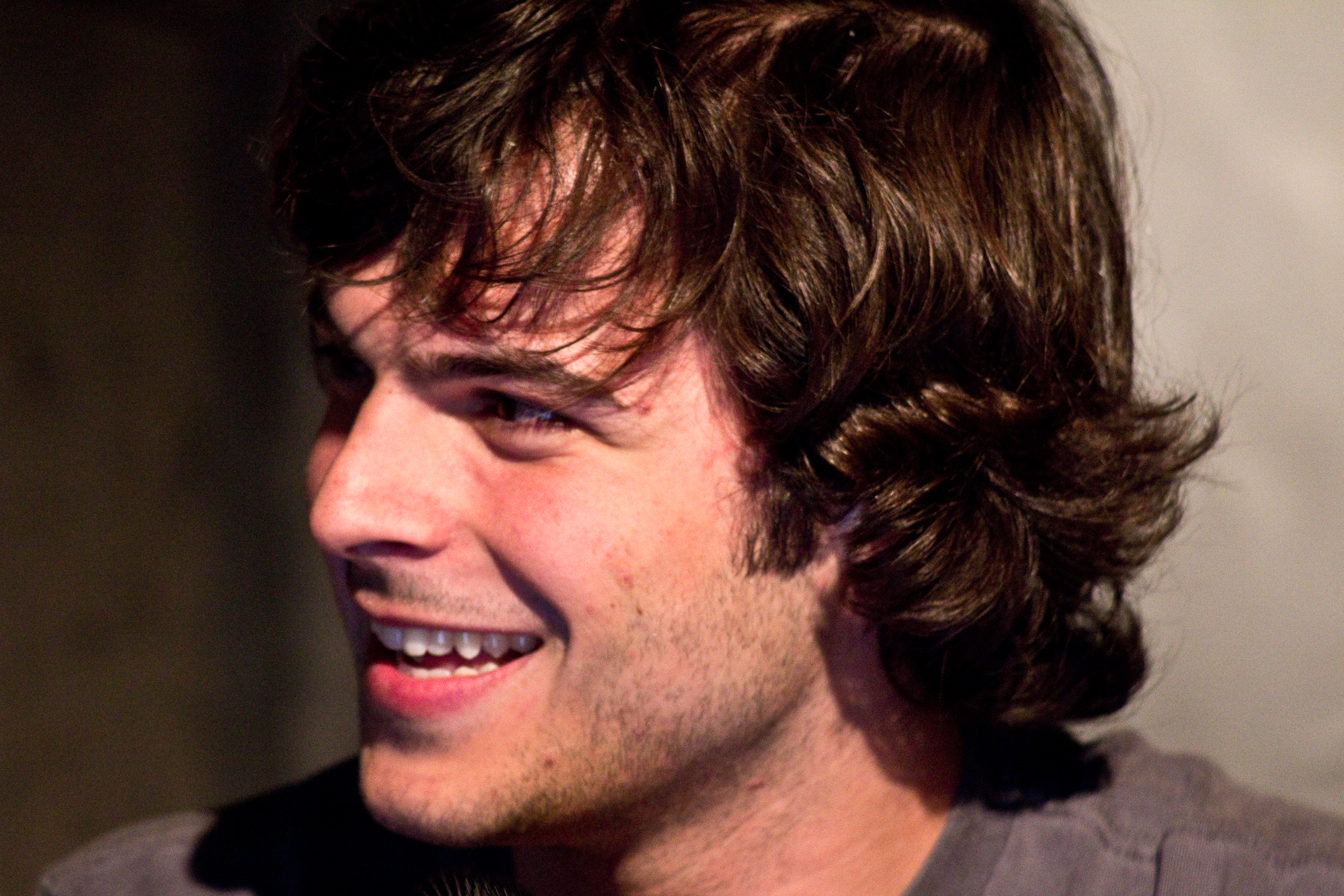
Guglielmo Scilla

Guglielmo Scilla (born in Rome on 26 November 1987) is an Italian web content creator, actor, and radio personality.

He became popular as Willwoosh thanks to his YouTube channel.

Scilla is openly gay.

== Filmography ==
=== Films ===
| Year | Title | Role(s) | Notes |
|---|---|---|---|
| 2010 | Una canzone per te | Gino | Feature film debut |
| 2011 | Wedding in Paris | Diego Quasimodo | |
| 2012 | 10 Rules for Falling in Love | Marco | |
| 2013 | Fuga di cervelli | Giuseppe Capra | |
| 2015 | Hybris | Alessio | |
| 2017 | I'm - Infinita come lo spazio | Peter | |

=== Television ===
| Year | Title | Role(s) | Notes |
|---|---|---|---|
| 2016 | Baciato dal sole | Ellio Sorrentino | Lead role (6 episodes) |
| 2017 | Pechino Express | Contestant | Reality show (season 6) |
| 2018 | Love Snack | Guglielmo | Episode: "La maestrina" |

=== Web ===
| Year | Title | Role(s) | Notes |
|---|---|---|---|
| 2011–2013 | Freaks! | Marco Diana | Web series (20 episodes) |
| 2012 | Lost in Google | Cinema Mask | Episode: "Five" |

=== Music videos ===
| Year | Title | Artist(s) | Notes |
|---|---|---|---|
| 2013 | "Ragazzo inadeguato" | Max Pezzali | |

=== Stage ===
| Year | Title | Role(s) | Notes |
|---|---|---|---|
| 2017 | Grease | Danny Zuko | Italian tour |

== Books ==
- L'inganno della morte (Kowalski editore, 2013)
- 10 regole per fare innamorare with Alessia Pelonzi (Kowalski editore, 2012)
