= ZeroZeroZero =

Italian crime drama television series

- Genre: Crime drama; Thriller
- Created by: Stefano Sollima; Leonardo Fasoli; Mauricio Katz
- Based on: ZeroZeroZero by Roberto Saviano
- Written by: Leonardo Fasoli; Mauricio Katz; Stefano Sollima; Max Hurwitz; Maddalena Ravagli
- Directed by: Stefano Sollima; Janus Metz; Pablo Trapero
- Starring: Andrea Riseborough; Dane DeHaan; Giuseppe De Domenico; Adriano Chiaramida; Harold Torres; Noé Hernández; Tchéky Karyo; Francesco Colella; Diego Cataño; Norman Delgadillo; Nika Perrone; Gabriel Byrne; Claudia Pineda; Érick Israel Consuelo; Jesús Lozano; José Salof; Flavio Medina; Víctor Huggo Martín; Seydina Baldé; Nabiha Akkari
- Composer: Mogwai
- Country of origin: Italy
- Original languages: English; Spanish; Calabrian; Italian; Wolof; French; Arabic; Tuareg
- No. of episodes: 8

Production
- Executive producers: Riccardo Tozzi; Gina Gardini; Giovanni Stabilini; Marco Chimenz; Richard Middleton; Matteo De Laurentiis; Stefano Sollima; Roberto Saviano; Leonardo Fasoli; Mauricio Katz; Pablo Trapero; Janus Metz; Stefano Bises
- Producers: Fabrice de la Patelliere; Pierre Saint-André; Nils Hartmann; Sonia Rovai; Rola Bauer; Jonas Bauer
- Production locations: Italy; Mexico; United States; Senegal; Morocco
- Cinematography: Paolo Carnera; Romain Lacourbas; Vittorio Omodei Zorini
- Editors: Hervé Schneid; Alejandro Brodersohn
- Running time: 48–66 minutes
- Production companies: Cattleya; Bartleby Film; Sky Italia; Sky Studios

Original release
- Network: Sky Atlantic (Italy); Canal+ (France); Amazon Prime Video
- Release: 14 February 2020 – March 6, 2020

ZeroZeroZero is an Italian crime drama television series created by Stefano Sollima, Leonardo Fasoli and Mauricio Katz for Sky Atlantic, Canal+ and Amazon Prime Video. It is based on the non-fiction book of the same name by Roberto Saviano, a study of the business around the drug cocaine, covering its movement across continents. The series stars Andrea Riseborough, Dane DeHaan and Gabriel Byrne as the American Lynwood family, controlling an international shipping company which acts as cocaine broker between Mexican and Italian organized crime. The series derives its name from the whitest, finest-milled type of wheat flour (000), which is "the nickname among narcotraffickers for the purest cocaine on the market."

The world premiere of ZeroZeroZero was on 5 September 2019 at the 76th Venice International Film Festival, where the first two episodes were screened out of competition. The series premiered on television on 14 February 2020 on Sky Atlantic in Italy. The series received generally favorable reviews.

== Premise ==
The series follows the troubled journey of a large shipment of cocaine from Monterrey, Mexico to Gioia Tauro, Italy. The sellers are Mexican drug lords Enrique and Jacinto Leyra, who are aided in their criminal activities by Manuel Quinteras and his group of corrupt soldiers; the buyer is Don Minu La Piana, a boss of the 'Ndrangheta, whose position is challenged by his ambitious grandson Stefano and the Curtiga family; the brokers in charge of the shipment are the Lynwoods, an American family from New Orleans owning a prestigious shipping company. The infighting within the 'Ndrangheta causes the shipment to be rerouted to Morocco, and the delay has dramatic consequences for all the interested parties.

== Cast ==
=== Main ===
- Andrea Riseborough as Emma Lynwood, eldest daughter of Edward Lynwood, running the family's shipping company
- Dane DeHaan as Chris Lynwood, Emma's younger brother, affected by Huntington's disease
- Giuseppe De Domenico as Stefano La Piana, a member of the 'Ndrangheta
- Adriano Chiaramida as Don Damiano "Minu" La Piana, a boss of the 'Ndrangheta and Stefano's grandfather
- Harold Torres as Manuel Quinteras, a soldier of the Mexican Army, secretly working for the Leyra brothers
- Noé Hernández as Varas, a commander of the Mexican Army
- Tchéky Karyo as François Salvage, a captain working for the Lynwoods
- Francesco Colella as Italo Curtiga, Stefano's ally
- Diego Cataño as Chino, a soldier of the Mexican Army
- Norman Delgadillo as Diego, a loyal soldier of the Mexican Army
- Nika Perrone as Lucia, Stefano's wife
- Gabriel Byrne as Edward Lynwood, Chris and Emma's father and head of the family's shipping company
- Claudia Pineda as Chiquitita, Diego's wife
- Érick Israel Consuelo as Moko, a soldier of the Mexican Army
- Jesús Lozano as Gordo, a soldier of the Mexican Army
- José Salof as Indio, a soldier of the Mexican Army
- Flavio Medina as Jacinto Leyra, a Mexican narco
- Víctor Huggo Martín as Enrique Leyra, a Mexican narco and Jacinto's brother
- Seydina Baldé as Omar Gamby, Emma's fixer in Dakar
- Nabiha Akkari as Amina, daughter of Yasser, the Lynwoods' fixer in Casablanca, and Chris's love interest

=== Recurring ===
- José Carlos Rodríguez as Pastor Jorge
- Kevin Z. Palmer as Rodrigo Pinillos aka Sombra
- Mostefa Djadja as Yasser, the Lynwoods' fixer in Casablanca and Amina's father

== Episodes ==
| No. | Title | Directed by | Written by | Original release date | Italy viewers (millions) (Note: Combined viewers of simulcast on Sky Atlantic and Sky Cinema 1.) |
|---|---|---|---|---|---|
| 1 | "The Shipment" | Stefano Sollima | Treatment by : Stefano Bises & Leonardo Fasoli & Roberto Saviano & Stefano Sollima; Teleplay by : Leonardo Fasoli & Mauricio Katz & Stefano Sollima | 14 February 2020 | 0.41 (o.n.) |
Italian mob boss Don Minu leaves his bunker. He goes to a meeting of mob family heads with his grandson, Stefano, and orders a cocaine shipment to revive their businesses and regain their trust. While collecting funds for the shipment, a loyalist of Don Minu is abducted by Stefano and fed to pigs; the money he collected is burned. In Monterrey, a special forces team track down a drug dealer to obtain the location of an upcoming meeting between the Leyras brothers and a broker. The special forces team surround the restaurant where the meeting is taking place. The Leyras brothers, Enrique and Jacinto, are alerted to the presence of the special forces team, and the meeting abruptly ends. As they are fleeing, Edward Lynwood, the broker, is shot. In a flashback, Edward and his daughter Emma negotiate the purchase of a large cargo ship. Emma's accountant alerts her that the money for the shipment has not come through yet. Emma and Edward discuss the risk of paying for the shipment upfront. Edward assures Emma that Don Minu will honor his word and send the money. Chris Lynwood, Emma's younger brother, attends a support group for people with Huntington's disease.
| 2 | "Tampico Skies" | Stefano Sollima | Leonardo Fasoli & Mauricio Katz | 14 February 2020 | 0.27 (o.n.) |
In Monterrey, a Mexican special forces team pursues the Leyras Brothers, Emma Lynwood and a wounded Edward Lynwood. They evade the special forces, but Edward Lynwood dies from the injuries. Stefano orders the Lynwood siblings to abort the shipment and connect him to the Mexican cartel, cutting the Lynwood's out. Emma stands up to him, telling him that the shipment will be on course as per the plan. Sergeant Manuel from the Mexican special forces team is summoned to meet with Captain Varas, who states that the Leyras brothers escaped because of a mole. Manuel assures Varas that he suspects are no one from his squad. Manuel tracks one of his team members, “Diego” in a club and kills him. He hangs the body from a bridge with messages announcing his involvement with the cartel around his neck, framing him as the mole. Later on, Sergant Manuel flies by helicopter, together with his team and Captain Varas, to the location of the Lynwood's ship. The forces locate the container in which the cocaine is kept. Manuel kills Varas. Manuel tells Chris, who is on the ship, to turn off the ship's communications and change their course.
| 3 | "Miranda" | Janus Metz | Story by : Leonardo Fasoli & Mauricio Katz; Teleplay by : Max Hurwitz | 21 February 2020 | 0.26 (o.n.) |
Manuel and his squad form a partnership with the Leyras brothers. Chris discovers that someone on the ship sabotaged the engine. He alerts the captain who knocks him unconscious. He wakes to the ship in flames, which he is able to extinguish, but kills the ship's power and mobility in the process. A flashback shows Stefano offering the captain cash in exchange for sabotaging the ship. Don Minu reveals to Stefano that he killed his own son, Stefano's father, because he started the last war. Don Minu has Stefano's friend, Nicola, burnt alive as a final warning. Don Minu's place is ambushed, but Stefano helps him escape.
| 4 | "Transshipment" | Janus Metz | Leonardo Fasoli & Mauricio Katz | 21 February 2020 | 0.21 (o.n.) |
Manuel and his team shoot more members of the military and sign up with the Leyras brothers. Manuel visits Diego's pregnant widow. Chris is able to get the ship to Dakar, Senegal. Nevertheless it is not allowed for him to continue with the ship to Italy. A street kid introduces Chris to a local crime lord. Emma arrives in Dakar. She hires a local fixer, Omar, to assist. Senegalese police come to inspect the cargo; however, Omar is able to postpone the inspection until the following day. In the middle of the night, Chris frantically wakes up Emma and tells her that police are coming to arrest them. In a flashback, Chris offered a deal to the crime lord he met earlier in order to rescue the cargo. The crime lord and his men gain access to the cargo and load the cocaine into trucks. The police are on their tail, but they manage to safely arrive at their hideout. Omar arrives with his men and they escort them out of Senegal. In the car, Emma notices Chris's spasms.
| 5 | "Sharia" | Janus Metz | Story by : Leonardo Fasoli & Max Hurwitz & Mauricio Katz; Teleplay by : Max Hurwitz | 28 February 2020 | 0.26 (o.n.) |
Stefano meets with his grandfather Don Minu. However, Don Minu knows that Stefano is plotting against him and, as a warning, has Stefano's closest confidant and friend executed. Stefano helps Don Minu escape and shoots himself in the shoulder so as not to arouse suspicion. The cartel's doctor treats Stefano's wound and realizes that Stefano inflicted the wound on himself. Chris and Emma's convoy approaches a town controlled by Jihadists. The jihadists want to escort the convoy in exchange for payment. Chris is taken forcefully by a group of men. Emma is held in a makeshift prison. At the following day, Omar appears outside the prison. Omar and Emma engage in a firefight with the jihadists, during which Omar is fatally wounded. Suddenly, a car zooms onto the scene, halting the shootout, and the presumed dead Chris gets out with his hands up. A flashback shows what happened to Chris. Together with the leader of the jihadists, Chris was attacked by a drone. The leader of the jihadists was seriously injured. Chris drives back to the fortress, where he gets caught in crossfire. In exchange for their wounded leader, the jihadists let Chris and Emma continue on their way.
| 6 | "En el mismo camino" | Pablo Trapero | Story by : Leonardo Fasoli & Max Hurwitz & Mauricio Katz; Teleplay by : Leonardo Fasoli & Max Hurwitz | 28 February 2020 | 0.26 (o.n.) |
Emma and Chris continue their journey and reach Casablanca, Morocco. Emma uses local contacts to organize the onward transport of the drugs to Italy. In Mexico, Manuel gains control over some local drug lords and recruits a few hundred teenage boys for his army. His men start a paramilitary camp to train and indoctrinate new recruits, whom they call "vampires." Manuel meets with one of the Leyras brothers and gives him the collection from the sale of their drugs. When he reminds them that it's payday, the Leyras brother tells him that he has to wait for the payment. Manuel is visibly upset but handles the situation calmly. Manuel taking Diego's widowed wife out on a date. Afterwards, his team informs him that one of his close confidants, “Indio,” has been seriously injured in a firefight. A flashback reveals the reason for the shooting: tensions between Leyra's men and Manuel's army escalate due to insults, leading to the shootout in which Indio is killed. Later, Diego's widow goes into labor and Manuel takes her to the hospital. He stands outside the room during the birth and is overwhelmed by his emotions.
| 7 | "Family" | Pablo Trapero | Story by : Leonardo Fasoli & Max Hurwitz & Mauricio Katz; Teleplay by : Leonardo Fasoli & Maddalena Ravagli | 6 March 2020 | 0.31 (o.n.) |
Bellantone, an adversary of Don Minu, takes Stefano's family hostage and forces Stefano to fly to Casablanca to prevent the delivery of the drugs. In Casablanca, Bellantone, his men, and Stefano kidnap the daughter of the Lynwood's fixer, Amina, and use her to track down the Lynwoods and the shipment. She takes them to the apartment where the Lynwoods are staying and Chris opens the door. A flashback shows what happened before. The shipment is loaded onto another cargo ship. Amina, the daughter of Emma's local contact person brings Chris medication for his Huntington's disease. Chris spends time with Amina and falls in love with her. The next morning, Emma goes to the port to see the shipment off. Chris stays in the apartment while there is a knock at the door. Amina, Bellantone, and Stefano are standing outside the door. They force Chris to take them to the drug delivery. Chris stalls them so that the shipment can be transported away on time without any problems. When Stefano realizes that Chris has sent him on a pointless search, he beats Chris up, which ultimately leads to his death. Bellantone tells Stefano that he now has to kill his grandfather.
| 8 | "Same Blood" | Pablo Trapero | Story by : Leonardo Fasoli & Max Hurwitz & Mauricio Katz; Teleplay by : Leonardo Fasoli & Max Hurwitz | 6 March 2020 | 0.31 (o.n.) |
In Monterrey, Diego's wife gives birth and Manuel admits to killing her husband. He leaves with his army to ambush a birthday party at the Leyras' home, slaughtering them and their men. Jacinto offers to bring $32 million to the house before Manuel kills him. Upon returning to Calabria, Bellantone forces Stefano to arrange a meeting with his grandfather for the assassination. When Stefano arrives at Don Minu's safe house, he is greeted by armed men and Emma. A flashback in Casablanca shows Emma finding Amina tied up, who reveals that the Italians took Chris to a warehouse; Emma finds Chris' body. Emma then flies to Calabria and tells Don Minu about Stefano's attempt to stop the shipment and that he murdered Chris. When Stefano arrives, Don Minu kills him and Emma gives him the location of the cocaine, as agreed. Don Minu's men kill Bellantone and his men, rescuing Lucia and her son. Emma arrives in Monterrey and receives the call from Jacinto. Upon arriving at the Leyras' home, she is escorted to Manuel through the carnage. She gives him the $32 million before asking if he can get her 2,000 kg of cocaine for another deal. He agrees and Emma leaves. As she walks away, Emma briefly twitches and stumbles, revealing that she has Huntington's disease just as her brother Chris had.

== Production ==
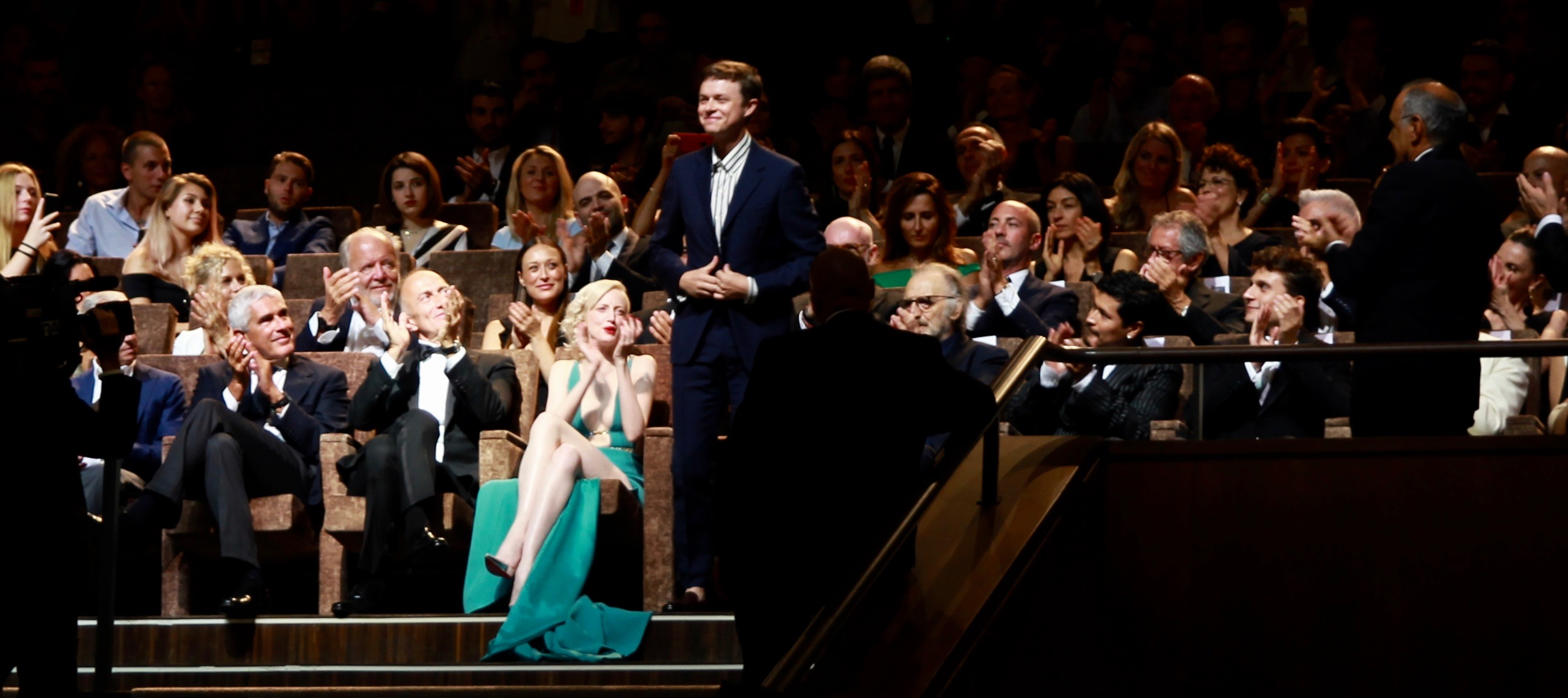
The cast with Stefano Sollima and Roberto Saviano at the prémiere during the 2019 Venice Film Festival

The series was shot in Mexico, Italy, Senegal, Morocco and the United States.

== Distribution ==
The series premiered on 14 February 2020 on Sky Atlantic in Italy. It was released in its entirety on 6 March 2020 on Amazon Prime Video in the United States, Canada, Latin America and Spain. ZeroZeroZero premiered on 9 March 2020 on Canal+ in France, and on 26 March 2020 on Sky Atlantic in Germany and Austria. It premiered on 14 May 2020 on SBS and SBS On Demand in Australia. The series premiered on 4 February 2021 on Sky Atlantic in the United Kingdom and Ireland.

HBO Europe has distributed the series in all its countries (Spain excluded) from 14 February 2020.

== Reception ==
ZeroZeroZero has been well-received by critics. It has a 94% "fresh" rating on Rotten Tomatoes, with an average rating of 8/10, based on 34 reviews. The Critics Consensus states, "An addictive thriller whose greatest weakness is that it is at times too withholding, ZeroZeroZero will stick with you long after the credits roll. It holds a 75/100 rating on Metacritic based on 10 reviews, indicating "generally favorable" reviews.

Nick Allen of RogerEbert.com praised ZeroZeroZero as "the kind of thriller that makes such a deep impression because it can think big and small at the same time, uniting three gripping individual stories into one massive saga." Mike Hale of The New York Times characterized the show as a "three shows in one: an Italian mafia saga with rocky Calabrian hillsides and generational omertà; a Mexican narco thriller with lavish cartel violence; and, more improbably, an indie-movie-style American family drama and character study. The series toggles among the three stories, which are intimately connected but for the most part told separately, with occasional meetings that are invariably bad news for the characters involved." He compared the series unfavorably to the earlier Roberto Saviano-based series, Gomorrah, but praised the characterization and performances of Riseborough and DeHaan. Daniel Fienberg of The Hollywood Reporter wrote that ZeroZeroZero was "beautifully shot, but frustratingly limited on character," and adding that "genre familiarity may make ZeroZeroZero less fresh, but it remains quite watchable, if you can ignore its vaguely nihilistic streak, thanks to a good cast, confident direction and cinematography that's really quite stunning at times."

== Soundtrack ==
A soundtrack album by Scottish band Mogwai was released on 1 May 2020.
