= Stefano Sollima =

Italian director and screenwriter (born 1966)

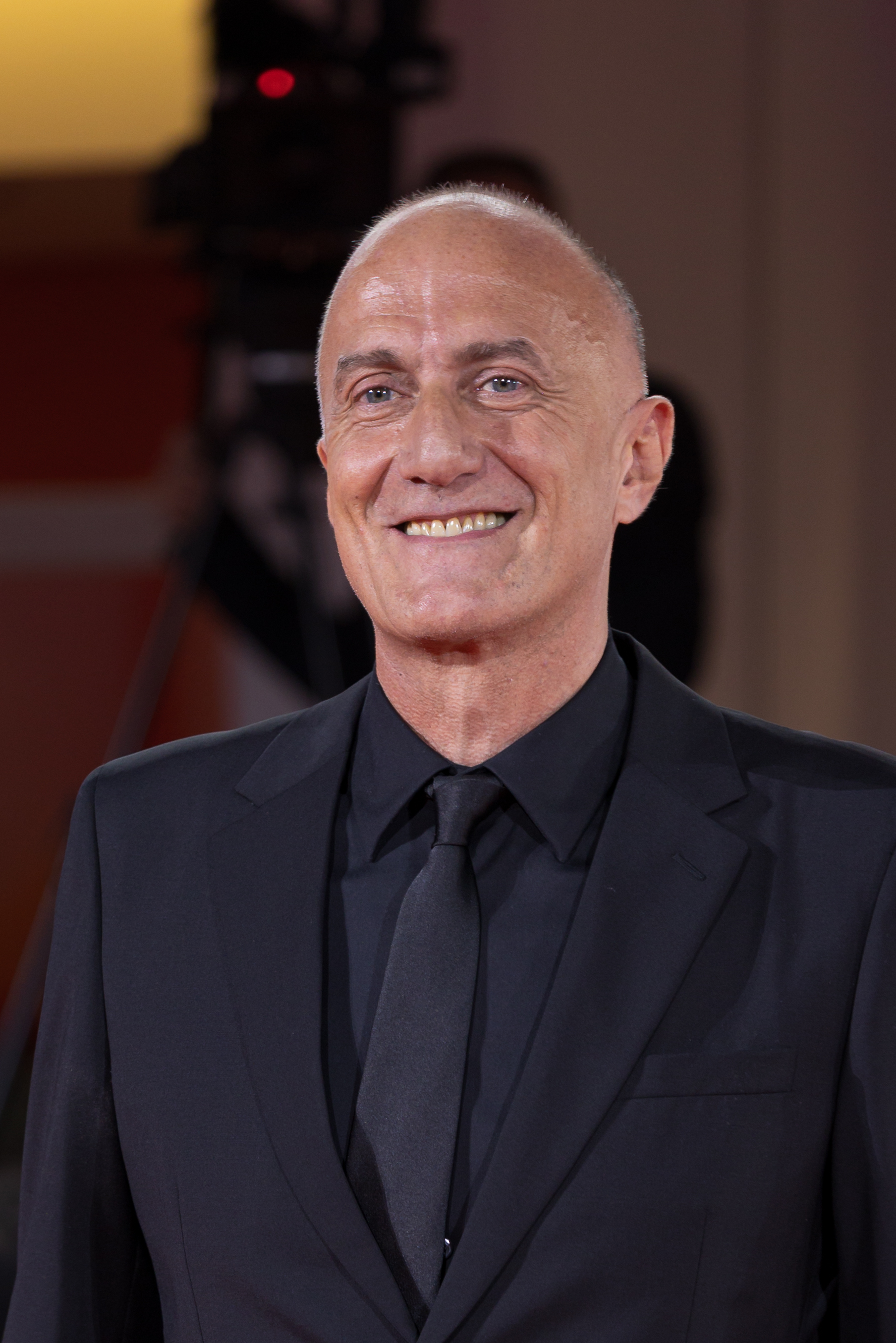
- Sollima in 2025
- Born: 4 May 1966 (age 60); Rome, Italy
- Occupations: Film director, television director, screenwriter
- Years active: 1991–present
- Father: Sergio Sollima

Stefano Sollima (Italian: [ˈsteːfano ˈsɔllima, ˈstɛː-]; born 4 May 1966) is an Italian director and screenwriter.

He is best known for his gritty crime-drama films such as ACAB – All Cops Are Bastards (2012), Suburra (2015), and Sicario: Day of the Soldado (2018), as well as the television series Romanzo criminale – La serie (2006–2008), Gomorrah (2014–2021), and ZeroZeroZero (2020).

== Early life ==
Born in Rome, Sollima is the son of Italian cult director and screenwriter Sergio Sollima. He started his career as a camera operator realizing numerous reports from war zones for several television networks, including CNN, CBS, and NBC.

== Career ==
In 1991, he made his debut as a director with the short film Thanks (Italian: Grazie), presented at the Turin Film Festival. His 1993 short film Sotto le unghie was entered at the International Critics' Week section of the 1993 Cannes Film Festival. In 2003, Sollima wrote and directed black-and-white short film Zippo, which was presented in competition at the 2003 Venice Film Festival and at the Sitges Film Festival.

Sollima started working as a television director in 1998 with the soap opera Un posto al sole, before directing episodes of several television series like La squadra (2003–2007), Ho sposato un calciatore (2005), and Crimes (2006–2007). He made his breakout in 2008 thanks to the acclaimed Sky Cinema crime series Romanzo criminale – La serie, based on the 2002 book of the same name by judge Giancarlo De Cataldo. Sollima directed all the 22 episodes of the series, which ran for two seasons from 2008 to 2010, winning the Best Television Director award at the 2009 Flaiano International Prizes.

In 2012 Sollima made his feature film debut with the police brutality drama ACAB – All Cops Are Bastards, for which he received a David di Donatello and a Nastro d'Argento nomination for the Best New Director award. From 2014, he served as the main director of Sky Cinema's acclaimed crime-drama series Gomorrah, based on the 2006 non-fiction book of the same name by Roberto Saviano and its previous film adaptation. After directing various episodes of the first and the second season of the show, Sollima dropped out of the series in 2016 due to schedule conflicts with his other future projects. He then directed the ensemble crime-drama film Suburra (2015), co-produced by Netflix, which brought him another Nastro d'Argento nomination, this time for Best Director. In 2017 the movie was adapted by Netflix into a prequel television series, the first Italian Netflix Original Series.

In 2018, Sollima made his English language film debut with the action crime thriller Sicario: Day of the Soldado, described as an "anthological sequel" to Sicario (2015), starring Benicio del Toro and Josh Brolin.

The same year, he began shooting the internationally co-produced crime TV series ZeroZeroZero, which he also co-created, about global cocaine trade from South America to Europe. Based on Roberto Saviano's non-fiction book of the same name, the show stars Dane DeHaan, Gabriel Byrne and Andrea Riseborough.

== AlterEgo ==
AlterEgo S.r.l.
- Type: Società a responsabilità limitata (S.r.l.)
- Industry: Entertainment
- Founded: March 2022; 4 years ago
- Founders: Stefano Sollima; Gina Gardini; Ludovico Purgatori
- Headquarters: Rome, Italy
- Products: Feature films; Television series
- Website: alteregofilm.it/en/

AlterEgo S.r.l., doing business as AlterEgo, is an Italian film and television production company. It was founded by Stefano Sollima, Gina Gardini and Ludovico Purgatori.

=== History ===
In 2024 it was announced that Stefano Sollima, Gina Gardini and Ludovico Purgatori had founded the production company AlterEgo. In 2023 it made its theatrical debut with Adagio (2023 film), a film by Stefano Sollima, produced in collaboration with The Apartment (production company) and distributed by Vision Distribution, which had its world premiere at the 80th Venice International Film Festival, where it competed for the Golden Lion. In 2024 AlterEgo signed an exclusive first-look deal with Fremantle (company) to collaborate on the development of original films and series. In 2025 they produced The Monster of Florence (2025 miniseries), a four-episode TV series directed by Stefano Sollima, produced in collaboration with The Apartment for Netflix, and presented at the 82nd Venice International Film Festival.

== Filmography ==
=== Feature films ===
Year	Title	Notes
2012	ACAB – All Cops Are Bastards	
2015	Suburra	
2018	Sicario: Day of the Soldado	
2021	Without Remorse	
2023	Adagio	

=== Short films ===
Year	Title	Director	Writer	Notes
1991	Thanks	Yes	Yes	
1992	Ipocrites	Yes	Yes	
1993	Sotto le unghie	Yes	Yes	
2003	Zippo	Yes	Yes	
2018	The Legend of Red Hand	Yes	No	Promoting Campari

=== Television ===
Year	Title	Director	Writer	Producer	Notes
1999	Un posto al sole	Yes	No	No	Unknown episodes
2003–2007	La squadra	Yes	No	No	7 episodes
2005	Ho sposato un calciatore	Yes	No	No	4 episodes
2006–2007	Crimes	Yes	No	No	3 episodes
2008–2010	Romanzo criminale – La serie	Yes	No	No	22 episodes
2009	Mal'aria	No	Yes	No	2 episodes miniseries
2014–2016	Gomorrah	Yes	No	Yes	10 episodes
2020	ZeroZeroZero	Yes	Yes	Executive	2 episodes, also creator
2025	The Monster of Florence	Yes	Yes	Executive	4 episodes miniseries
2025	Public Disorder	No	No	Executive	Netflix limited series

=== Music videos ===
- "Distratto" — Francesca Michielin (2012)

== Awards and nominations ==
Year	Award	Category	Title	Result
1992	Turin Film Festival	Prize of the City of Torino	Thanks	Nominated
1993	Turin Film Festival	Best Short Film	Sotto le unghie	Nominated
1993	Cannes Film Festival	Canal+ Award	Sotto le unghie	Nominated
2003	Venice Film Festival	Best Short Film	Zippo	Nominated
2003	Catalonian International Film Festival	Best Short Film	Zippo	Nominated
2009	Flaiano International Prizes	Best Television Director	Romanzo criminale – La serie	Won
2012	Moscow International Film Festival	FIPRESCI Prize	ACAB – All Cops Are Bastards	Won
2012	Moscow International Film Festival	Russian Film Critics Award	ACAB – All Cops Are Bastards	Won
2012	Moscow International Film Festival	Russian Film Clubs Federation Award	ACAB – All Cops Are Bastards	Won
2012	Moscow International Film Festival	Golden St. George	ACAB – All Cops Are Bastards	Nominated
2012	David di Donatello	Best New Director	ACAB – All Cops Are Bastards	Nominated
2012	Nastro d'Argento	Best New Director	ACAB – All Cops Are Bastards	Nominated
2012	Kineo Awards	Best First Feature	ACAB – All Cops Are Bastards	Nominated
2013	Golden Graal	Best Director — Drama	ACAB – All Cops Are Bastards	Nominated
2016	Nastro d'Argento	Best Director	Suburra	Nominated
