= 2005 in Italian television =

This is a list of Italian television related events from 2005.

== Events ==
=== RAI ===
- 26 February – Actress and TV host Hoara Borselli and her partner Simone Di Pasquale win the first season of Ballando con le stelle.
- 5 March: Francesco Renga, with Angelo, wins the Sanremo Festival, hosted by Paolo Bonolis. The final evening is the most seen show of the year, with 13, 6 million viewiers.
- 8 April : the three RAI channel, Canale 5, Rete 4 and La 7 simultaneously broadcast live the funeral of Pope John Paul II. Almost 14 million viewers follow the event on the various channels.
- 30 May: on digital terrestrial TV, launch of RAI Futura, a channel aimed to young people.
- 1 June Sandro Curzi, as older Counselor, becomes RAI President in place of Francesco Alberoni; on 31 July is replaced by Claudio Petruccioli. On 5 August, Alfredo Meocci becomes RAI general director.
- 27 October: on RAI 1, the second episode of Rockpolitik, a show hosted and directed by Adriano Celentano, obtains 12.5 million viewers (with a peak of 15.6 when the singer performs with Roberto Benigni). Celentano realizes the program in absolute freedom and does not fail to tease the Berlusconi cabinet and the director of RAI 1 Fabrizio Del Noce (who had resigned temporarily in disagreement with the show).
- 8 November: the satellite channel RAI News 24 broadcasts Fallujah, The Hidden Massacre, a Sigfrido Ranucci’s enquiry denouncing the use of white phosphorus bombs by the American Army in the battle of Fallujah. The documentary gets a worldwide echo, but it’s aired only partially on the main RAI channels.
- 16 November Lory Del Santo wins the third edition of L’isola dei famosi, hosted by Simona Ventura.

=== Mediaset ===
- 20 January: Mediaset launches its pay-per-view service, Mediaset Premium. Initially, it broadcasts only Serie A matches, but from June it is extended to film, fiction and reality show.
- 30 July: for the first time, Mediaset gets the free-to-air rights to Serie A, RAI serves the Copia Italia alone.
- 3 October: launch of the home-shopping channel Mediashopping. It replaces the similar Canale D, purchased by Mediaset in March and closed in July.

=== Other channels ===
- 27 August: on the digital terrestrial TV, launch of La7 Sport.
- 1 October: on the Sky platform, debut of Discovery Real Time.
- 3 October: the music channel Rete A All Music is bought by L’espresso group and change its name in All Music.

== Debuts ==
=== RAI ===
==== Serials ====
- Provaci ancora prof (Try it again, teacher) – detective comedy from the Margherita Oggero’s tales, with Veronica Pivetti as a teacher amateurish detective, Enzo Decaro and Paolo Conticini; 7 seasons.
- Il capitano – by Vittorio Sindoni, with Alessandro Preziosi and Gabriella Pession as two Guardia di Finanza’s officers; 2 seasons.
- Gente di mare (Sea people) – series about the Italian Coast Guard, with Lorenzo Crespi and Vanessa Gravina; 2 seasons.
- Foga and crimes – by Riccardo Donna, procedural set in the lower Po Valley, with Luca Barbareschi and Natasha Stefanenko; 3 seasons.

==== Variety ====
- 8 January – Ballando con le stelle, italian version of Strictly come dancing, hosted by Milly Carlucci (2005–present).
- Glob (or L’osceno del villaggio) – satirical program about the mass-media, hosted by Enrico Bertolino; 8 seasons.
- Il malloppo - game show with Pupo, then with Alba D'Eusanio; 2 seasons.
- Sabato & domenica - morning show of the week-end; 5 seasons.

==== Talk show ====
- E la chiamano estate (They call it summer) - summer talk-show, hosted by Michele Cucuzza ; 4 seasons.
- Festa italiana – afternoon talk-show, hosted by Caterina Balivo; 5 seasons.
- In ½ h (or Mezz’ora in più) political talk-show with Lucia Annunziata, then with Monica Maggioni, again on air.
- TV Talk – talk show about television, hosted by Massimo Bernardini, then by Mia Ceran; again on air.

==== Educational ====
- Verba volant - five minute daily strip about linguistic and cultural themes, care of Alessandro Robecchi and Peter Freeman; 5 seasons.

=== Mediaset ===
==== Serials ====
- RIS – Delitti imperfetti with Lorenzo Flaherty and Nicole Grimaudo; 5 seasons and a spin-off (RIS Roma).
- Il giudice Mastrangelo by Enrico Oldoini, with Diego Abatantuono ; 2 seasons.
- Belli dentro – sit-com set in a penitentiary, with Geppi Cucciari; 3 seasons.
- Caterina e le sue figlie – comedy-drama with Virna Lisi, Alessandra Martines and Ray Lovelock, 3 seasons.

==== Talk show and news ====
- Il senso della vita (The meaning of life) - talk show hosted by Paolo Bonolis; 4 seasons.
- Il bivio - Cosa sarebbe successo se... (The crossroad: What would have happened if…) – talk show hosted by Enrico Ruggeri; 3 seasons.
- Matrix – late night in-depth program hosted by Enrico Mentana, then by other journalists; 13 seasons.

=== Other channels ===
- Le invasioni barbariche – talk-show hosted by Daria Bignardi; 10 seasons (La7)
- All Music Show – mix of music show and demented humor, hosted by Paola Rota; lasted till 2007 (All Music)
- M2 All Shock – music show, hosted by Renée la Bulgara, in collaboration with m2o radio; lasted till 2009 (All Music).
- MilleVoci – musical show, hosted by Gianni Drudi, then by Daphne Barillaro ; again on air (local channels).

==== MTV Italia ====
- Very Victoria – talk show with Victoria Cabello; 4 seasons.
- MTV Mobile Chart – hit-parade of the most downloaded mobile ringtones from the MTV Italia website, with Paolo Ruffini; 2 seasons
- MTV Storytellers – Italian version of VH1 Storytellers, hosted by Paola Maugeri, lasted till 2009.
- School in Action – reality show, showing the preparation of a school spectacle, with Marco Maccarini and Francesco Mandelli; 2 seasons.

=== Satellite ===
- S.O.S. tata – Italian version of Nanny 911, with Lucia Rizzi (Fox Life, then La 7; 8 seasons).
- Il club delle cuoche (Cook women club) – cooking show, hosted by Luisanna Messeri ; again on air (Alice)
- Quelli dell’intervallo (Those of recess) – sit-com with a school setting; 7 seasons and 3 spin-off (Disney Channel).
- Monster allergy - cartoon series; 2 seasons (Toon Disney)

==== Real Time ====
- Cortesie per gli ospiti (Gallantries for the guests) – Italian version of Come dine with me, hosted by Chiara Tonelli and others, again on air ; it has generated 4 spin-offs.
- Wedding Planners – docu-reality with Enzo Miccio; again on air with the title Diario di un wedding planner.
- Paint Your Life – tutorial about the do-it-yourself, with Barbara Guilenetti; 8 seasons.

=== International ===
- October – (United Kingdom) BB3B (Disney Channel) (2005)
- (United States) Desperate Housewives (Fox Live).
- (United States) Lost (Fox)
- (United States) House (Italia 1)
- (United States) Grey’s anatomy (FOX life).

== Television shows ==
=== Rai ===
==== Drama and comedy ====
- Il bambino sull’acqua (The child on the water) by Paolo Bianchini, with Beppe Fiorello and Vittoria Belvedere; a couple chooses to live on a boat for the health of their asthmatic son.
- Il bell’Antonio – by Maurizio Zaccaro, from Vitaliano Brancati’s Beautiful Antonio, with Daniele Liotti and Nicole Grimaudo.

===== Crime =====
- L’uomo sbagliato (The wrong man) by Stefano Reali, with Beppe Fiorello; inspired to the true story of Daniele Barillà, victim of a sensational miscarriage of justice.
- La caccia by Massimo Spano, with Claudio Amendola and Alessio Boni; a punisher, to avenge his family, hunts down an innocent man.
- Mio figlio (My son) – by Luciano Odorisio with Lando Buzzanca as a police inspector who must face the homosexuality of his son.

===== Comedy =====
- Il mondo è meraviglioso – by Vittorio Sindoni, with Enrico Montesano as an unscrupulous businessman.
- Padre Speranza – by Ruggero Deodato, with Bud Spencer as the chaplain of a juvenile prison.
- Il veterinario by Josè Maria Sanchez, with Gigi Proietti and Anna Galliena; a veterinary doctor is faultlessly involved in a case of pet food adulteration.

===== Romance =====
- L’amore non basta (Love is not enough) – by Tiziana Aristarco, with Francesco Salvi and Veronica Pivetti.
- Un anno a primavera – by Angelo Longoni, with Nicoletta Romanoff and Giorgio Pasotti; love story set in a therapeutic community.
- Regina dei fiori (The queen of flowers) – by Vittorio Sindoni, with Manuela Arcuri and Giorgio Lupano.

===== Historical drama =====
- Imperium: Saint Peter by Giulio Base, with Omar Sharif in the title role.
- Meucci, l’italiano che inventò il telefono (The Italian inventor of the telephone) by Fabrizio Costa, with Massimo Ghini in the title role.
- Pope John Paul II by John Kent Harrison, with Jon Voight in the title role; coproduced with Lux Vide.
- Cefalonia by Riccardo Milani with Luca Zingaretti, Luisa Ranieri and Jasmine Trinca; fictionalized account of the massacre of the Acqui Division.
- Il cuore nel pozzo (The heart in the pit) – by Alberto Negrin, with Leo Gullotta and Beppe Fiorello; first Italian fiction about the foibe massacres.
- De Gasperi, l’uomo della speranza (Man of hope) by Lilliana Cavani, with Fabrizio Gifuni in the title role.
- Edda by Giorgio Capitani, with Alessandra Martines (Edda Mussolini), Massimo Ghini (Galeazzo Ciano) and Claude Brasseur (Benito Mussolini).
- Il grande Torino (Grande Torino) - by Claudio Bonivento, with Ciro Esposito and Beppe Fiorello (as Valentino Mazzola).

==== Miniseries ====
- La maledizione dei templari (The Templars' curse) – by Josée Dayan, from Maurice Druon’s The accursed kings, with Jeanne Moreau, Gerard Depardieu and Luca Barbareschi; 5 episodes. Coproduced with France and Romania.

==== Serial ====
- Una famiglia in giallo (A family of detectives) – detective comedy with Giulio Scarpati and Valeria Valeri.

==== Variety ====
- Rockpolitik - show hosted and directed by Adriano Celentano; 4 episodes (see over)
- Speciale per me, ovvero meno siamo meglio stiamo (Special for me, or The less, the merrier) – musical show, hosted by Renzo Arbore and Antonio Stornaiolo. The program, ideated in 4 episodes, is dilated until 17 ones, thanks to its public success.
- Sanremo question time – talk-show commenting the Sanremo music festival; 4 seasons.
- Bla bla bla – fake talk-show, (actually, a demented parody of the genre) hosted by Lilo and Greg.
- Ma chi sei, Mandrake? (Are you Mandrake?) – game show, hosted by Carlo Conti; illusionism competition, with VIP as participants.
- Le tre scimmiette (Three wise monkeys) - game show, with Simona Ventura.
- Ritorno al presente (Back to the present) – reality-show from a Dutch format, hosted by Carlo Conti and closed anticipately for low ratings. 14 VIP contenders try to live as in the past.
- Sabato italiano with Pippo Baudo.
- TG Duel - parody of the news program, aired after TG2, with Gene Gnocchi.

==== News and educational ====
- Fallujah, The Hidden Massacre,by Sigfrido Ranucci (see over).
- Pronto soccorso H24 – docu-reality showing the daily life in the emergency department of the San Giovanni Addolorata Hospital; it is broadcast also in Fox Life, in a harsher version.
- Una notte con Zeus (A night with Zeus) – talk-show inspired to the Greek mythology, with Daniela Poggi.

==== For children ====
- Eppur si muuove by Sergio Manfio, first European series in live-action animation, showing the making of a cartoon; 3 seasons.
- Radio G.R.E.M. – sitcom for children, aimed to the learning of the English language.
- Farhat, il principe del deserto – by Giuseppe Laganà, fantasy cartoon with a young arabian prince as protagonist.
- Foot 2 rue, cartoon from Stefano Benni’s La compagnia dei Celestini, coproduced with France; 5 seasons.

=== Mediaset ===
==== Drama and comedy ====
- Il mio amico Babbo Natale by Franco Amurri, Christmas fable with Lino Banfi (as Santa Claus) and Gerry Scotti.
- La signora delle camelie by Ludovico Gasparini, with Francesca Neri; from Alexandre Dumas fils’ The lady of the camellias, the action is transferred from Paris to Milan.
- Gli occhi dell’amore – romantic comedy directed and interpreted by Giulio Base, with Michela Ramazzotti.
- I colori della vita (Colors of life) by Stefano Reali, with Nancy Brilli and Alessandra Martines; history of a troubled female friendship.
- Carasinieri: sotto copertura – by Raffaele Mertes, with Manuela Arcuri and Ettore Bassi; spin-off of Carabinieri.

===== Biopic =====
- Karol: A Man Who Became Pope by Giacomo Battiato, with Piotr Adamczyk in the title role; Italian-Polish coproduction.
- Sacco & Vanzetti by Fabrizio Costa, with Sergio Rubini (Nicola Sacco) and Ennio Fantastichini (Bartolomeo Vanzetti); coproduced wit Bulgaria.
- Imperia la grande cortigiana by Pier Francesco Pingitore, with Manuela Arcuri as Imperia Cognati.
- Callas e Onassis by Giorgio Capitani, with Luisa Ranieri (Maria Callas) and Gérard Damon (Aristotle Onassis).
- Dalida by Joyce Bunuel, biopic with Sabrina Felilli (in the title role) and Alessandro Gassmann (Luigi Tenco); coproduced with France.

==== Miniseries ====
- Ho sposato un calciatore by Stefano Sollima, Italian version of Footballers' wives, with Paolo Seganti, Jane Alexander and Edoardo Leo, 4 episodes.
- Padri e figli (Fathers and sons) by Gianfranco Albano and Gianni Zanasi, with Silvio Orlando and Marina Massironi; 6 episodes. Family stories revolving around a medical consulting center.
- Ricomincio da me (I restart from myself) by Rossella Izzo, with Barbara D’Urso and Ricky Tognazzi; 6 episodes. A divorced woman rebuilds her life and find again her first love.
- Grandi domani, Italian version of the Spanish series Un paso Adelante, by Vincenzo Terraciano, with Marco Giallini.

==== Sit-coms ====
- Il supermercato (The supermarket) – sitcom with Enrico Bertolino and Angela Finocchiaro.
- Call center – sit-com with Beatrice Luzzi; first Italian serial realized for a satellite channel (Happy Channel).

==== Variety ====
- Mio fratello è pakistano (My brother is a Pakistani) – with Teo Mammuccari, variety focused on the confrontation between Italians and immigrated.
- Il Piattoforte – cooking show with Iva Zanicchi.
- Sei un mito – impersonators' competition, Italian version of Performing Us, with Roberta Capua.
- Vero amore – Italian version of Temptation island, hosted by Maria De Filippi.
- Torte in faccia (Pies in the face) - variety with the Bagaglino troupe and an introducing Aida Yespica.
- Showgirls – sexy game show, aired on satellite (Happy Channel.)

==== News and educational ====
- Liberitutti, storie di italiani – talkshow with Irene Pivetti.
- Serie A - Il grande calcio – Mediaset version of 90° minuto, with Paolo Bonolis.

=== MTV Italia ===
- MTV Bathroom – sit-com set in bar WC, with Francesco Mandelli and Fabrizio Biggio.
- MTV Absolutely - show about the history of pop music in the Eighties and the Nineties, with Giorgia Surina.
- Pimp My Wheels – italian version of Pimp my ride, with Gemelli Diversi (MTV ).
- Viva Las Vegas – docu-reality about life in the gambling capital, with Alessandro Cattelan and Giorgia Surina .

=== Satellite ===
- Chicas – fashion show hosted by Ambra Angiolini (Fox life).
- Factory – docu-reality, showing the making of an artwork (Cult).
- Full metal otaku - daily magazine about manga, anime and Eastern cinema (Canal Jimmy).
- L'ost – cooking show with Alessandro Borghese (Real Time).
- Esodo (Exodus) – documentary by Nicolo Bongiorno about the Istrian-Dalmatian exodus (History ).

== Ending this year ==
- Amanti e segreti
- Cronache marziane
- La domenica del villaggio
- Dove osano le quaglie
- Elisa di Rivombrosa
- Finalmente soli
- Galà della pubblicità
- Galapagos
- Il maresciallo Rocca
- Melevisione e le sue storie
- Pets show
- Un posto tranquillo
- Sospetti
- Top of the kids

== Networks and services ==
=== Launches ===
Network	Type	Launch date	Notes	Source
Animal Planet	Cable and satellite	1 May		
Sportitalia 2	Cable and satellite	1 September		
MediaShopping	Cable and satellite	30 September		
Discovery Real Time	Cable and satellite	1 October		
AXN	Cable and satellite	29 October		
Fox Crime	Cable and satellite	31 October		
XXXX	Cable and satellite	30 November		

== Deaths ==
- 27 February: Franco Bracardi, musician and comic actor, 69
- 1 March: Alberto Castagna, journalist and presenter, 59.
- 2 March: Corrado Pani, actor, 68.
- 19 March: Jader Jacobelli, journalist, host of Tribuna politica, 86.
- 27 May: Franco Diogene, actor, 57.
- 15 June: Valeria Moriconi, actress, 73.
- 3 July: Alberto Lattuada, director, 90.
- 2 August: Sandro Bolchi, director, 80.
- 24 August: Ambrogio Fogar, explorer and author of travel programs, 64.
- 25 september: Fulvia Colombo, the first announcer in history of Italian television, 79
- 15 December: Giuseppe Patroni Griffi, director, 84.
- 25 December: Felice Andreasi, comic actor, 77.

== See also ==
- List of Italian films of 2005
