= Fox Animation (TV channel) =

International television channel

- Country: Italy

Programming
- Languages: Italian; English
- Picture format: 576i (SDTV); 1080i (HDTV)
- Timeshift service: Fox Animation +1; Fox Animation +2

Ownership
- Owner: Fox Networks Group Italy (Walt Disney Direct-to-Consumer & International)
- Sister channels: Fox, Fox Crime, Fox Life, Fox Comedy, Fox Retro

History
- Launched: 1 November 2014
- Closed: 1 October 2019 (4 years, 334 days)

Fox Animation was a television channel in Italy owned by Fox Networks Group Italy, dedicated to animated series by Fox. It began as a pop-up channel on Fox +2 from 15 December 2012 and 6 January 2013 and later around Christmas 2013. On 1 November 2014 it was launched as a standalone channel, replacing Fox +2.

Because of Sky Italia's deal with The Walt Disney Company Italy not being renewed, the channel was shut down on 1 October 2019, along with Disney XD, Disney in English, Fox Comedy and Nat Geo People.

== Programming ==
- American Dad!
- Archer
- Bob's Burgers
- Bordertown
- Brickleberry
- The Cleveland Show
- Family Guy
- Futurama
- King of the Hill
- The Real Ghostbusters
- Rick and Morty
- Robot Chicken
- The Simpsons
- Son of Zorn
