= Disney XD (Italy) =

Defunct Italian children's television channel

- Final logo used from 1 February 2016 to 1 October 2019
- Country: Italy
- Broadcast area: Nationwide
- Headquarters: Milan

Programming
- Language: Italian
- Picture format: HDTV 1080i
- Timeshift service: Disney XD +1; Disney XD +2 (2011–2018)

Ownership
- Owner: The Walt Disney Company Italy
- Sister channels: Disney Channel; Disney Jr. Disney in English

History
- Launched: 1 April 2000; 26 years ago
- Replaced: Jetix
- Closed: 1 October 2019; 6 years ago
- Former names: Fox Kids (2000–2005); Jetix (2005–2009)

Availability

Terrestrial
- Sky Italia: Channel 616 (HD); Channel 617 (+1); Channel 676 (SD)

Disney XD was an Italian subsciption television channel aimed primarily at children and teenagers, specifically boys. The channel was owned by Walt Disney Television Italia, a subsidiary of Disney. It was officially version of the United States original television channel of the same name launched exclusively on the Sky Italia platform on 28 September 2009, and closed on 1 October 2019.

The channel's official announcer was the voice actor Maurizio Merluzzo.

== History ==
=== Fox Kids/Jetix ===
The channel launched as Fox Kids in April 2000 on the Stream DTH platform, airing from 6:00am–7:00pm every day. By July 2001, the channel reached 650,000 subscribers.

On 19 July 2001, Fox Kids Italia announced the launch of a free-to-air programming strand under the name that would air on syndicated television stations such as Antenna 3, Lombardia and Super 3 every day 6pm-7pm, and launched on 1 September 2001. On 1 December 2001, the block was installed at the Bambino Gesù Children's Hospital in Rome.

In September 2002, the Fox Kids syndicated block was extended to start at 5:30pm, with a 6:45am-8am morning slot added. A one-hour timeshift was launched on July 31, 2003.

With the Jetix rebranding, Fox Kids launched a Jetix-branded primetime block that ran from 7pm-10:30pm every day in mid-2004. the syndicated Fox Kids block was separated and rebranded as K-2 in October 2004 In 2009, it was launched as its own digital terrestrial television channel, and the Fox Kids channel was rebranded as Jetix on 1 March 2005.

In May 2005, a sister channel aimed at a male teenage audience – GXT, was launched, exclusively for Sky Italia.

In October 2006, an Italian version of Jetix Magazine launched.

On 1 July 2009, K-2 re-launched as a standalone free-to-air television channel, and was rebranded as K2.

=== As Disney XD ===
On 15 July 2009, it was announced that the Italian subsidiary of Jetix Europe, Jetix Italy S.r.l., would undergo a management buyout under the name of Switchover Media, and would purchase the GXT and K2 networks and blocks from The Walt Disney Company. The company also agreed to operate Jetix Italy for Disney until its rebranding as Disney XD Italy would go to fruition.

On 7 September 2009, it was officially announced that the rebranding to Disney XD would occur on 28 September 2009, and on that date, channel operations transferred from Switchover Media to The Walt Disney Company Italia.

On 1 October 2011, Disney XD +2, a two-hour time shift of the channel, was launched. The channel also switched to the 16:9 widescreen ratio on 9 May 2012. On 15 September in the same year, a high definition simulcast was also launched.

From 8 to 21 June 2015, the channel's +2 timeshift temporarily rebranded to a pop-up channel solely airing Hannah Montana.

On 1 October 2019, due to Disney's failure to renew their contract with Sky, the channel, along with Disney in English, Fox Animation, Fox Comedy and Nat Geo People, was shut down.

In Switzerland, the Italian version of the channel would be replaced by the Italian version of Disney Junior starting from 27 November of that year, which would later close on 1 April 2020.

== Logos ==
1 April 2000 – 1 March 2005

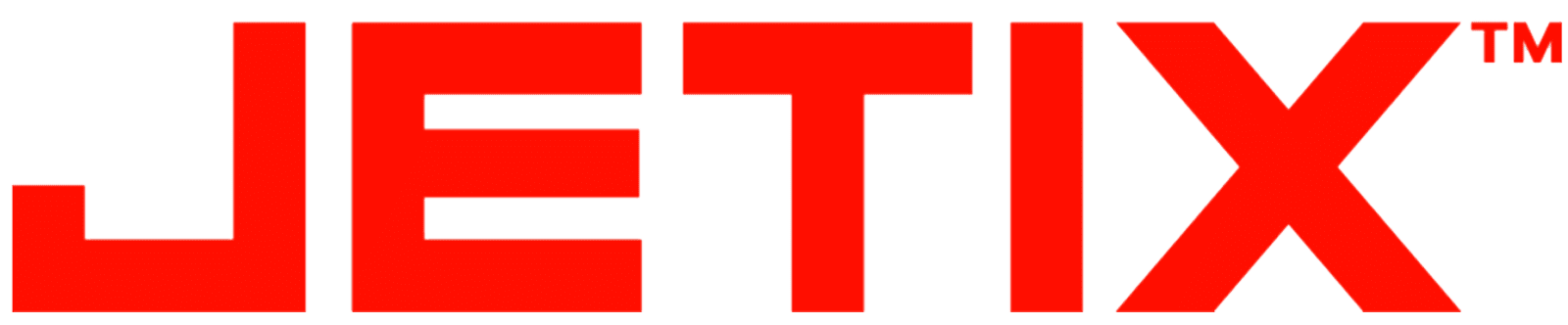
1 March 2005 – 28 September 2009

28 September 2009 – 1 February 2016

1 February 2016 – 1 October 2019
