= Atlantique Productions =

French drama production company

- Type: Subsidiary
- Industry: production de films et de programmes pour la télévision
- Founded: August 25, 2013; 13 years ago
- Headquarters: Paris, France
- Parent: Lagardère Studios (2016–2020); Mediawan (2020–present)
- Website: www.atlantiqueproductions.fr

Atlantique Productions is a French drama production company that specializes in producing international high-end drama series.

In 2008, Atlantique Productions was acquired by Largadère Entertainment.

In late-September 2013, Atlantique Productions announced that Klaus Zimmermann their co-CEO and managing director was stepping down as its co-CEO & managing director after working with Atlantique Productions for four years

In June 2020, French audiovisual production and distribution company Mediawan was in exclusive negotiations to acquire Largardère's entertainment production & distribution division Lagardère Studios that include its drama production subsidiary Atlantique Productions for €100 million in order to expand Mediawan's drama production output

== Filmography ==
Title	Years	Network	Notes
Borgia	2011–2014	Canal+ ZDF (Germany); ORF 2 (Australia); Sky Cinema 1/Sky Atlantic (Italy)	co-production with EOS Entertainment
Transporter: The Series	2012–2014	M6; RTL (Germany)	co-production with QVF
Jo	2013	TF1	co-production with Stromboli Pictures and The Mattawin Company
The Eddy	2020	Netflix	co-production with Fifty Fathoms, Endeavor Content, Augury, One Shoe Films and Boku Films
Django	2023	Canal+ Sky Atlantic (Italy)	co-production with Sky Studios and Cattleya
