= Sky Atlantic (Italy) =

Television channel

- Logo used since 2021
- Country: Italy
- Broadcast area: Italy; San Marino; Vatican City
- Affiliates: Sky Uno; Sky Arte

Programming
- Languages: Italian, English
- Picture format: 576i (SDTV); 1080i (HDTV)
- Timeshift service: Sky Atlantic +1 (2014-2025)

Ownership
- Owner: Sky Italia
- Sister channels: Sky Uno; Sky Investigation; Sky Serie; Sky Collection

History
- Launched: 9 April 2014; 12 years ago

Links
- Website: tg24.sky.it/spettacolo/sky-atlantic (in Italian)

Availability

Streaming media
- Sky Go: Sky Atlantic
- Now: Sky Atlantic

Sky Atlantic is an Italian-language pay television channel owned by Sky Italia that was launched on 9 April 2014.

== Programming ==
The channel relies heavily on screenings of US television programmes from HBO and Showtime.

=== Current ===
- Blocco 181 (2022)
- Call My Agent - Italia (2023)
- Gomorrah: The Origins (2026)
- Avvocato Ligas (2026)

=== Former ===
Series
Title	First broadcast	Last broadcast	Notes
Gomorrah	2014	2021	
Borgia (season 3) (Note: Seasons 1 and 2 originally aired on Sky Cinema 1 in 2011 and 2013, respectively.)	2014	2014	Co-production with Canal+, ZDF, and ORF
In Treatment (seasons 2–3) (Note: Season 1 originally aired on Sky Cinema 1 in 2013.)	2015	2017	
Dov'è Mario?	2016	2016	
The Generi	2018	2018	
Devils	2020	2022	Co-production with OCS
Petra	2020	2022	
Romulus	2020	2022	
Domina	2021	2023	Co-production with Sky Atlantic (United Kingdom) and MGM+ (season 2)
Christian	2022	2023	
The King	2022	2024	

Miniseries
Title	Broadcast	Notes
1992	2015	Co-production with La7
The Young Pope	2016	Co-production with HBO and Canal+
1993	2017	
The Miracle	2018	
Catch-22	2019	Co-production with Hulu
1994	2019	
The New Pope	2020	Co-production with HBO and Canal+
ZeroZeroZero	2020	Co-production with Canal+ and Amazon Studios
We Are Who We Are	2020	Co-production with HBO
I Hoped to Die First	2021	
Anna	2021	
The Big Game	2022	
Django	2023	Co-production with Canal+
One Summer Ago	2023	
Unwanted - Hostages of the Sea	2023	
Dostoevsky	2024	
Mussolini: Son of the Century	2025	
The Art of Joy	2025	
Rosa Elettrica	2026	
