= Jo (TV series) =

2013 French TV series

- TV poster
- Also known as: Le Grand
- Genre: Mystery; Police procedural Thriller
- Created by: René Balcer; Franck Ollivier; Malina Detcheva
- Written by: René Balcer; Franck Ollivier; Malina Detcheva; Diana Son; Ed Zuckerman
- Directed by: Charlotte Sieling; Kristoffer Nyholm; Stephan Schwartz; Sheree Folkson
- Starring: Jean Reno; Jill Hennessy; Tom Austen; Orla Brady; Heida Reed; Chris Brazier; Celyn Jones; Wunmi Mosaku; Sean Pertwee
- Theme music composer: Matei Bratescot (France & Belgium)
- Opening theme: Light Up (France & Belgium)
- Composer: Thomas Hass Christensen
- Country of origin: France
- Original language: English
- No. of seasons: 1
- No. of episodes: 8

Production
- Executive producer: René Balcer
- Producers: Klaus Zimmermann; Olivier Bibas; Alfred Lot
- Production location: Paris
- Cinematography: Jørgen Johansson; Tommaso Fiorilli; Jean-Max Bernard
- Editors: Stratos Gabrielidis; Joel Jacovella; Diane Logan; Patrick Zouzout
- Camera setup: Single-camera
- Running time: 45–47 minutes
- Production companies: Atlantique Productions; Stromboli Pictures; The Mattawin Company

Original release
- Network: Fox Crime (Italy); La Une (Belgium); TF1 (France); Sat.1 (Germany); ORF (Austria); RTS (Switzerland); 2BE (Belgium)
- Release: January 17 – March 7, 2013

Jo (previously known by the working title Le Grand) is an English-language French police procedural television series created by Canadian-American screenwriter René Balcer of Law & Order fame with French writing team Franck Ollivier and Malina Detcheva, known for the miniseries Lost Signs, and variously directed by Charlotte Sieling (The Killing), Kristoffer Nyholm (Taboo, The Vanishing), Sheree Folkson (Another Life), Stefan Schwartz (The Americans). It is co-produced by the French Atlantique Productions and the Belgian Stromboli Pictures companies in association with broadcast partners TF1, RTBF, Sat.1, ORF and RTS.

The series, shot entirely in Paris, is centered on Jo Saint-Clair, a cop played by French star Jean Reno in his first lead TV role. Along with his team, Jo attempts to solve murders taking place around some of the French capital's most famous locations.

Jo premiered in Italy on Fox Crime on January 17, 2013 where it was a ratings success, garnering twice the number of viewers as Borgia, and has since been broadcast in several other European countries and across Latin America and southern Africa, with its debut in an English-speaking country set for May 19 in the United Kingdom and Ireland. Among the partner channels, it premiered in Belgium on La Une on April 18, 2013 and a week later in France on TF1. A second season was initially expected with the first having been a ratings success and Jean Reno having signed for two seasons from the get-go, however it was later announced in early June 2013 that TF1 had cancelled the show.

== Plot ==
Commander Jo Saint-Clair, a veteran of Paris' homicide bureau, is experienced in solving the most mysterious murders. As brilliant as he is fearsome, Saint-Clair has the intelligence of serial killers, allowing him to solve a series a crimes plaguing the French capital's most iconic sights: the Eiffel Tower, Notre-Dame, the Catacombs, the Place Vendôme. In his private life, Saint-Clair also has known his share of problems. With the help of his confidant Karyn, an unorthodox nun working in the city's problem areas, he will try to reconnect with his estranged daughter Adèle.

== Cast ==
- Jean Reno as Joachim "Jo" Saint-Clair, the lead character, a brilliant cop with an intimate knowledge and love of Paris, who's known many problems throughout his life, notably involving alcohol, drugs and women but he's trying to put them behind him and become a better father to his estranged daughter Adèle. The son of a prostitute, he was given the name of the street he was born in, Saint-Clair. The character was initially known as Joachim Legrand when the project was first announced at the MIPTV Media Market, but was later revealed to be Saint-Clair later that year at the Mipcom.
- Jill Hennessy as Sister Karyn, an unorthodox nun who doesn't wear the traditional habit. As brave as she is vulnerable, she suffered a great loss at the age of 19, undertook theology studies, devoted her life to God and is now in charge of a refuge for prostitutes where she was like a second mother to Adèle, Jo's daughter, when she was living there. She met him through her and is now Jo's close friend and confidant, serving as a bridge between him and Adèle and sometimes helping out on his cases.
- Tom Austen as Marc Bayard, an enthusiastic and determined young Police Lieutenant who's quickly moved up the ranks of the Police force. He's been working with Jo for two years at the start of the series and shares a father-son relationship with him. As a young husband and father himself, he has trouble balancing his family life and professional duties.
- Orla Brady as Béatrice Dormont, Jo's superior officer and friend.
- Heida Reed as Adèle Gauthier, Jo's estranged daughter.
- Chris Brazier as Yannick Morin
- Celyn Jones as Nick Normand, the unit's expert in computers and numbers.
- Wunmi Mosaku as Angélique Alassane, the unit's person in charge of medical reports.
- Sean Pertwee as Charlie, Saint-Clair's nemesis, childhood friend and head of a crime syndicate.
- Eriq Ebouaney as Amadou.

=== Notable guest stars ===
- Sam Waterston as David Zifkin
- Geraldine Chaplin as Liliane Coberg
- Leslie Caron as Josette Lenoir
- Olivia d'Abo as Nicole Wallace
- Sienna Guillory as Claire
- Hugo Becker as Eddy
- Miranda Raison as Katie Miville
- Julie Cox as Sharon

== Production ==
=== Conception ===
Jo is one of several ambitious new shows commissioned by French channel TF1, along with Falco, No Limit and the English-language series Crossing Lines and Taxi Brooklyn that showcase the channel's desire to become a bigger player in the international market and a change in French channels' conception of TV shows. As such, production company Atlantique Productions already has considerable experience with such efforts, having been behind the English-language Borgia for Canal+ and Transporter: The Series for M6. The show was announced on March 28, 2012 under the title Le Grand (a nickname for Jean Reno's character) and was presented in more detail in the first few days of April at the MIPTV Media Market where it was sold on the strength of star Jean Reno and showrunner René Balcer's names.

Balcer had previously co-created the French cop show Mission Protection Rapprochée for TF1 in the late nineties and had participated in the development of Paris enquêtes criminelles, the French adaptation of his Law & Order: Criminal Intent. He co-produces the show through his The Mattawin Company.

=== Format ===
Producer Klaus Zimmermann described the show as a cop show where every episode is a "mini The Da Vinci Code". Jo's personal journey has a series-long arc, but each episode is centered on one case, linked to an iconic location of Paris. The city is considered by the creators like its own character, with director Charlotte Sieling stating "the main character is the cop and the second character is Paris". To make the show more appealing to international buyers, the typical episode lasts about 45 minutes, like American network "hour-long" dramas rather than French ones which last about 50 minutes.

=== Casting ===
Jo represents Jean Reno's first regular role in a TV series and his first role in a series overall since an episode of the anthology series Série Noire in 1985. He was attached to the project from the beginning, when his character was known as Joachim Legrand, and the series was sold in part of the strength of his name. While he's been regularly offered parts in TV shows, he accepted this one due to its international scope and the fact it would be shot in English, but also stated that he didn't see himself doing the show many years as it wasn't "[his] thing". While the 63-year-old actor has played many cops throughout his career, he differentiated this one by his softer side and his relationship with his daughter. Reno also provided his voice for the show's French dub, as he usually does.

Canadian actress Jill Hennessy was named the second regular as shooting began, playing a nun who is a close friend of Reno's character, making it her fourth lead role in a TV show. Hennessy appreciated that the show had "aspects of great television police drama but then it adds all these other mystical elements and personal elements as well" and felt that the show was hard to "put in a box".

British actor Tom Austen first heard of the project through his agent a month before filming, but at the time his part was meant for a 40-year-old actor of Middle-Eastern origin. Attracted by the idea of shooting in Paris with actors he admires, the 24-year-old was however able to get a meeting with director Charlotte Sieling, whose work on The Bridge was also among the reasons the project interested him, and along with her he managed to convince the producers that he was right for the part and began his gun training a few days later. Jo is Austen's second regular role in a television series after the short-lived Beaver Falls.

Apart from Reno, most of the main actors are native English speakers, all playing French characters. Actor David Coburn was brought in as a vocal coach to ensure all the actors spoke with the same General American accent, apart from Jean Reno whose accent was considered part of his charm and appeal.

=== Filming ===
Production began on the Île de la Cité at 4 a.m. on July 16, 2012 and lasted for 88 days in Paris and its suburbs until November 8, making it the first English-language show to be shot entirely in the French capital. Four directors each helmed two of the season's eight episodes. These include Danish filmmakers Charlotte Sieling and Kristoffer Nyholm (both known for their work on The Killing) as well as Stephan Schwartz and Sheree Folkson. Sieling was responsible for the show's look, having directed the pilot episode, and was particularly enthusiastic about the project stating the show would be something that had not been seen before, a hybrid of Scandinavian, French and English series, comparing it to the ever-changing patterns of a kaleidoscope. She brought in her usual cinematographer Jørgen Johansson for her episodes, while Nyholm and Folkson's episodes were handled by French cinematographer Tommaso Fiorilli, who's worked on several TV shows before, including Spiral, and Schwartz's by Jean-Max Bernard. The production designer for the season was Ambre Sansonetti, who's had considerable experience on police procedurals having held the same position on the TV show Braquo as well as the films 36 Quai des Orfèvres and MR 73.

The show was produced to be carbon neutral. Each episode was shot in about ten days, mostly in exteriors and budgeted at 2 million euros (or 16 million for the entire season), with TF1 contributing 900,000 per episode (or 7,200,000 overall). This represents twice the French average but is in line with other similar efforts such as Borgia or XIII: The Series. The show required the hiring of 85 technicians and 160 thespians, the construction of 32 sets per episode in Saint-Ouen, the renting of 51 vehicles and the cooking of 10,000 meals.

=== Post-production ===
Editors for the show include Stratos Gabrielidis for the Charlotte Sieling episodes, Joel Jacovella for the Kristoffer Nyholm episodes and Patrick Zouzout for the Stephan Schwartz episodes, all of whom have worked on several episodes of XIII: The Series. The Sheree Folkson episodes were edited by Diane Logan.

The show's score was composed by Thomas Hass Christensen, another collaborator of Sieling's.

== Reception ==
=== Critical response ===
Response to the show in France and Belgium was overwhelmingly negative. In Télérama, Samuel Douhaire found that the famous locations of Paris showcased in every episode were used very badly, that the cops looked like caricatures from American shows and that the series' worst aspect is its cliché-ridden exploration of Jo's private life. In the Belgian Le Vif, Guy Verstraeten was also turned off by the clichéd nature of the show, stating that the creators couldn't be bothered to create a single original thing. Writing for Le Nouvel Observateur, Mathieu Cantorné labeled the show as "unoriginal and conformist" but did concede that the atmosphere "could be somewhat appealing". Negative views also came from the website Onirik and the Belgian newspaper L'Avenir. Many outlets also singled out the poor quality of the French dub.

Positive opinions came from the tabloid Closer, which found the series to be a good mix between a French and American show; Le Parisien, which considered the show efficient and praised the actors; and Télé Loisirs, which was impressed with the directing.

International reception was equally mixed. In the Irish Independent, John Boland was baffled by the use of English, felt that the Paris locales brought nothing and wrote that the show "ends up like a diluted hybrid of Criminal Minds, Leverage, NCIS and any or all of the CSI spin-offs". Gabriel Tate called it a "truly scattershot affair" in Time Out, with Jean Reno its sole saving grace, and awarded it two out of five stars. Eurodrama called it "A visually arresting series with a tightly controlled central performance from Jean Reno, [that] takes us on a whistle-stop tour of Paris' most sensational locations, and its most depraved, but never shifts its focus from the story of a man who will always be enslaved by anguish.". ZombieHamster said: "There's plenty to enjoy within the eight episodes. Joe is wonderfully engrossing and thrilling with lavish set pieces, and is carried by a marvelous central performance by Reno who is at his surly and cantankerous best." Munya Vomo in the South African Independent Online labeled the series as "definitely something to look forward to".

=== Ratings ===
Jo episode rankings in the Belgian television market
Episode	Timeslot	Rank	Share	Viewers
1	Thursday 8:14 p.m.	#2	19.1%	319,300
2	Thursday 9:05 p.m.	#2	16%	267,800
3	Thursday 8:14 p.m.	#1	23%	353,600
4	Thursday 9:06 p.m.	#2	19.5%	302,200
5	Thursday 8:20 p.m.	#2	17.2%	280,600
6	Thursday 9:10 p.m.	#2	15.6%	260,900
7	Thursday 8:17 p.m.	#2	18.8%	310,800
8	Thursday 9:08 p.m.	#2	16.1%	278,000
Season 1 Average			18.2%	296,650

Jo episode rankings in the French television market
Episode	Timeslot	Rank	Share	Viewers
1	Thursday 8:50 p.m.	#1	30.3%	7,472,000
2	Thursday 9:40 p.m.	#1	27.8%	6,400,000
3	Thursday 8:50 p.m.	#1	23.8%	6,224,000
4	Thursday 9:40 p.m.	#1	23.9%	5,600,000
5	Thursday 8:50 p.m.	#1	22.5%	5,568,000
6	Thursday 9:40 p.m.	#1	23%	5,200,000
7	Thursday 8:50 p.m.	#1	22.1%	5,793,000
8	Thursday 9:40 p.m.	#1	22.4%	5,300,000
Season 1 Average			24.5%	5,944,625

Jo episode rankings in the Austrian television market
Episode	Timeslot	Share	Viewers
1	Wednesday 10:00 p.m.	12%	223,000
2	Wednesday 10:48 p.m.	13%	169,000
3	Wednesday 10:00 p.m.	10%	184,000
4	Wednesday 10:00 p.m.	—N/a	—N/a
5	Wednesday 10:00 p.m.	9%	153,000
6	Wednesday 10:00 p.m.	—N/a	—N/a
7	Wednesday 10:00 p.m.	—N/a	—N/a
8	Wednesday 10:00 p.m.	—N/a	—N/a
Season 1 Average		—N/a	—N/a

Jo episode rankings in the German television market
Episode	Timeslot	Share	Viewers
1/2	Thursday 10:15 p.m.	10.4%	1,740,000
3	Thursday 10:15 p.m.	9.2%	1,880,000
4	Thursday 10:15 p.m.	10.7%	1,780,000
5	Thursday 10:15 p.m.	8.9%	1,750,000
6	Thursday 10:15 p.m.	—N/a	—N/a
7	Thursday 10:15 p.m.	—N/a	—N/a
8	Thursday 10:15 p.m.	—N/a	—N/a
Season 1 Average		—N/a	—N/a

== Broadcast history ==
Season	Episodes	Originally released		DVD release date Region 2	Blu-ray release date Region B
Season	Episodes	First released	Last released	DVD release date Region 2	Blu-ray release date Region B
1	8	January 17, 2013	March 7, 2013	June 5, 2013 (France) / August 5, 2013 (United Kingdom) / August 16, 2013 (Germany)	August 16, 2013 (Germany)

Atlantique Productions entered in negotiations with the American Ion Television network at the MIPTV Media Market for what would be Ion's first original series. The agreement was finalized on July 19, 2012, the details of which include Ion paying 4 million dollars to license the 8 episodes and having English title, budget and final cut approval, among other things. Ion, however, never paid Atlantique what it was owed, citing their dissatisfaction with Jean Reno's accent and other creative concerns, further claiming in September that they had never entered in an agreement with Atlantique. As such, Atlantique filed a lawsuit against Ion for 4 million dollars in direct damages on October 9, 2012 in a California federal court.

The German ProSiebenSat.1 Media group and Italian RAI acquired the free-TV rights for the show on September 10 and September 25, 2012 respectively, prior to its presentation at the Mipcom in early October with Sat.1 additionally becoming a broadcast partner.

Jo premiered in Italy on Fox Crime on January 17, 2013 and completed its run in 8 weeks at a pace of one episode per week on Thursdays. It was later shown in Poland on Fox starting January 25, Spanish-speaking Latin American countries on FX from March 4 onwards, in Spain on Fox three days later and Brazil on FX starting March 10. In Belgium La Une started showing the series on April 18, 2013, and RTS Un in Switzerland the next day, where it completed its run in four weeks at a pace of two episodes per night. It began broadcasting a week later in France on TF1 at the same pace, also on Thursdays in prime time. Oddly, TF1 only showed the program dubbed in French, not giving the option to see the episodes in English as they do for their American shows. Following this, the show started airing in Portugal on Fox on May 6, before having its premiere in an English-speaking country, debuting in the United Kingdom and Ireland May 19 on Fox. RTL Klub started programming Jo two days later in Hungary and by May 27 it was showing in the African countries covered by Fox. More than a month later, the series had its German-language premiere, airing on its Austrian and German broadcast partners, ORF eins and Sat.1, starting July 3 and 4 respectively, with the first two episodes shown on the same night, but following episodes were shown at a one-per-week pace.

Broadcast rights for the show have so far been sold to 140 countries.

=== Overview ===
Country	Network(s)	Series premiere	Timeslot
Italy	Fox Crime	January 17, 2013	Thursdays at 9:00 pm
Poland	Fox	January 25, 2013	Fridays at 10:00 pm
Cyprus Greece Malta	Fox	February 27, 2013	Wednesdays at 9:30 pm
Argentina Bolivia Chile Colombia Costa Rica Dominican Republic Ecuador Honduras Mexico Panama Paraguay Peru Uruguay	FX	March 4, 2013	Mondays at 10:00 pm
Venezuela	FX	March 4, 2013	Mondays at 10:30 pm
Spain	Fox	March 7, 2013	Thursdays at 10:20 pm
Brazil	FX	March 10, 2013	Sundays at 11:00 pm
Belgium	La Une	April 18, 2013	Thursdays at 8:14 pm/9:05 pm
Switzerland	RTS Un	April 19, 2013	Fridays at 10:55 pm/11:40 pm
France	TF1	April 25, 2013	Thursdays at 8:50 pm/9:40 pm
Portugal	Fox	May 6, 2013	Mondays at 11:05 pm
Ireland United Kingdom	Fox	May 19, 2013	Sundays at 9:00 pm
Hungary	RTL Klub	May 21, 2013	Tuesdays at 9:25 pm
Czech Republic	Prima family	July 30, 2013	Tuesdays and Thursdays at 9:35 pm
Angola Mozambique South Africa	Fox	May 27, 2013	Mondays at 8:15 pm
Austria	ORF eins	July 3, 2013	Wednesdays at 10:00 pm
Germany	Sat.1	July 4, 2013	Thursdays at 10:15 pm
Russia and post-Soviet states (except the Baltic states)	Channel One Russia	August 20, 2013	Monday-Thursday at 00:30 am
Finland	Fox	October 7, 2013	Mondays at 10:00 pm
Netherlands	Fox NL	October 16, 2013	Wednesdays at 8:30 pm/9:25
Japan	WOWOW	October 22, 2013	Tuesdays at 11:00 pm
Slovakia	TV Doma	April 28, 2014	Mondays at 20:30
Cape Verde	RTC	October 1, 2014	Wednesdays at 8:12 pm

=== Episode order and alternate versions ===
Opening titles as seen in France, Belgium, Hungary and Switzerland (bottom) and across the world on the Fox channels (top). The two credit sequences also feature different theme music

Confusingly, the Fox International Channels in Africa, Greece, Ireland, Italy, Latin America, Netherlands, Poland, Portugal, Spain and the United Kingdom as well as RTL Klub in Hungary on one hand and La Une, RTS Un, TF1, ORF eins and Sat.1 in Belgium, France, Switzerland, Austria and Germany on the other have aired or plan to air the episodes of the series in two different orders, reflected in the following chart. According to Balcer, the Fox International Channels version and air order was the intended "official version", while the other version represented TF1's unilateral decision to re-edit the show as they felt it was too dark – changing the music, color and pacing. For example, according to Balcer, in addition to changing the theme music and the score, TF1 also changed source music – in the official version, the opening of Notre Dame featured an organist playing Mozart's Requiem on a digital organ, setting up the tone and the theme of the series as it relates to Jo Saint-Clair, but TFI changed this music to a lighter maudlin piano piece.

In addition, the orders also feature vastly different edits. In addition to the opening credits and music being changed, the Franco-Belgian-Swiss versions have several scenes cut or replaced, music tracks changed and different color grading. According to Balcer, scenes which had been cut from the official version because of poor performances or directing (for example, in Pigalle, the interview with a witness on the Eiffel tower and a search of the victim's apartment) were put back in by TF1. Again, according to Balcer, the TF1 changes created an imbalance between the procedural and personal scenes and wreaked havoc on the actors' performance. Balcer has disowned the TF1 version, which has not surprisingly been met with largely negative reviews.

Episode	Fox International/Hungarian order	Austrian/Belgian/French/German/Swiss order
Notre-Dame	1	1
Pigalle	2	4
Concorde	3	2
Invalides	4	3
Place Vendôme	5	5
Le Marais	6	6
Opera	7	7
Catacombs	8	8

=== Cancellation ===
TF1 announced the show's cancellation on June 7, 2013, shortly before filming on the second season was scheduled to begin, citing disappointing ratings and prohibitive costs. A few days later, co-creator René Balcer reacted to the news at the Monte-Carlo Television Festival, expressed hope that the series might still continue due to its international success and blamed TF1 and the changes they made to the show for its reception in France and wherever the TF1 version was shown. He pointed out that the official original version had met with greater success wherever it played.

Part of the show was financed through a deal with US-based Ion TV. Jo was allegedly going to be Ion's first foray into an original TV series, but things went awry, either because the network got cold feet or there was a terrible misunderstanding. When pressed for payment, Ion TV purportedly cited creative concerns, such as the "intelligibility" of Jean Reno's accent. Atlantique Productions now claims $4 million transatlantic breach-of-contract lawsuit in direct damages, plus alleges it has been further harmed by the "loss of value to the Series in the marketplace," since losing an American network distributor allegedly adversely affects the license fees that the producers can get in other territories. The producers also say that have been scrambling to find funding so it can meet contractual delivery obligations to other licensees. The loss of this American distributor led to the cancellation of the show.

== Episodes ==
The first four episodes of the series have so far been presented in two different orders depending on which country it has aired (see above). They are presented here in the official order they first premiered in, on Fox Crime in Italy, and are shown in most countries. Belgium and France airdates are also shown as the two countries co-produced the show.

No.	Title	Directed by	Written by	Italian release date	Belgian release date	French release date	Viewers/Share (Belgium)	Viewers/Share (France)
1	"Notre-Dame"	Charlotte Sieling	René Balcer	January 17, 2013	April 18, 2013	April 25, 2013	319,300 (19.1%)	7,472,000 (30.3%)
The lifeless body of famous organist Johan Van Vliet is found at the foot of the "Portal of the Last Judgement" of Notre-Dame. His eardrums were pierced and his face set towards the statue of the angel who plays the trumpet to sound the waking of the dead. An outstanding musician, Van Vliet was also an egocentric man known to be a womanizer. In making the victim symbolically deaf to the call of the angel, the killer seems to have wanted to prevent the victim from receiving divine mercy.
2	"Pigalle"	Charlotte Sieling	Story by : René Balcer & Diana Son; Teleplay by : Diana Son	January 24, 2013	April 25, 2013	May 2, 2013	302,200 (19.5%)	5,600,000 (23.9%)
During a Fashion Week show, a 38-year-old former model is hurled off the Eiffel Tower. Her lover's wife is initially suspected, but Jo then follows a trail back to 22-year-old Jasmine, a showgirl in Quartier Pigalle and the dead supermodel's abandoned illegitimate daughter.
3	"Concorde"	Kristoffer Nyholm	René Balcer	January 31, 2013	April 18, 2013	April 25, 2013	267,800 (16%)	6,400,000 (27.8%)
Mountaineer Bernard Lang's body is discovered with a broken neck in climbing gear at the foot of the Luxor Obelisk in the Place de la Concorde. Fascinated by the obelisk and its history, Jo knows that the monument is also a great vantage point of the surrounding area, including the suites at the Hôtel de Crillon. And in one of them, that evening, a well-bred young woman (Miranda Raison) was cheating on her husband.
4	"Invalides"	Stephan Schwartz	Story by : René Balcer, Franck Ollivier & Malina Detcheva; Teleplay by : Franck Ollivier & Malina Detcheva	February 7, 2013	April 25, 2013	May 2, 2013	353,600 (23%)	6,224,000 (23.8%)
Charlotte, a 35-year-old Mirage pilot, is found dead in front of Les Invalides, wearing a ring stolen a year earlier during the murder of a family in the south of France. Her lover, a mysterious mechanic, is quickly suspected, but while unearthing the details of that forgotten crime, Jo discovers a conspiracy.
5	"Place Vendôme"	Stephan Schwartz	Story by : René Balcer & Ed Zuckerman; Teleplay by : Ed Zuckerman	February 14, 2013	May 2, 2013	May 9, 2013	280,600 (17.2%)	5,568,000 (22.5%)
In a parking lot on Place Vendôme, firefighters uncover the charred body of Philip Roquin, an accountant for one of the square's many jewelry stores. His wife admits that he was kidnapped and that a ransom was requested. The investigation leads Jo Saint-Clair to a prison where a woman called Lisette was incarcerated.
6	"Le Marais"	Kristoffer Nyholm	Story by : René Balcer, Franck Ollivier & Malina Detcheva; Teleplay by : Franck Ollivier & Malina Detcheva	February 21, 2013	May 2, 2013	May 9, 2013	260,900 (15.6%)	5,200,000 (23%)
Marie-Eve Lambert, a young gallerist, is found lying on the Place des Vosges, killed by a violent blow to the head. Believing at first in a crime of passion, Jo discovers a mysterious message in the victim's hand which leads him to the Archives Nationales, where Marie-Eve was doing research on women in the French Resistance deported to Auschwitz.
7	"Opera"	Sheree Folkson	Story by : René Balcer, Franck Ollivier & Malina Detcheva; Teleplay by : René Balcer	February 28, 2013	May 9, 2013	May 16, 2013	310,800 (18.8%)	5,793,000 (22.1%)
Leaving the Palais Garnier where he had just dropped off his daughter for her dance class, Raymond Sittler is assaulted on the steps of the Opera. A few seconds later, he starts convulsing, collapses on the porch and dies. Initially suspected, his mistress is also murdered at the Barbès-Rochechouart station, through poison. The investigation leads Jo to the prestigious Sorbonne University and to the door of a troubled student and his ambitious girlfriend.
8	"Catacombs"	Sheree Folkson	Story by : René Balcer & Diana Son; Teleplay by : Diana Son	March 7, 2013	May 9, 2013	May 16, 2013	278,000 (16.1%)	5,300,000 (22.4%)
A young geneticist was stabbed in the Paris Catacombs, a Satanist symbol etched on her back. Jo is convinced that this is a crime of passion. But the case takes an unexpected turn when the team discovers that the victim was conducting experiments with plague bacteria recovered from skeletons of the catacombs. The trail leads to a mysterious woman who could well be a serial killer on the run. She seems to already have chosen her next victims: the family of a prominent politician. The killer turns out to be Nicole Wallace (played by Olivia d'Abo), the one-time nemesis of Det. Robert Goren in the series Law & Order: Criminal Intent (also created by René Balcer).

== Home video release ==
Region 2 DVD cover of the complete series showing Jean Reno, Tom Austen, Orla Brady, Celyn Jones and Wunmi Mosaku (left to right)

TF1 Video released the complete series on DVD on June 5, 2013. The eight episodes are spread over two discs, only available in dubbed French and the release is devoid of any special features. The original English sound track will be legally available on August 5, 2013, when UK distributor Arrow Films is set to release the Fox edits on DVD, also spread over two discs. Ten days later, the series will have its Blu-ray debut in Germany through StudioCanal, under the title The Cop: Crime Scene Paris. Both the original English and the dubbed German will be included in this release, which is spread across two discs, while the DVD version is spread across three.
