= Disney Jr. (Italy) =

Italian pay-television channel

- Logo used from 1 December 2025
- Broadcast area: Italy; Malta; San Marino; Vatican City
- Headquarters: Milan, Italy

Programming
- Language: Italian
- Picture format: HDTV 1080i; SDTV 576i (downscaled)
- Timeshift service: Disney Junior +1

Ownership
- Owner: The Walt Disney Company EMEA
- Parent: The Walt Disney Company Italia S.r.l.
- Sister channels: Disney Channel

History
- Launched: 1 May 2005; 21 years ago (original); 1 December 2025; 9 months ago (relaunch)
- Closed: 1 May 2020; 6 years ago (original)
- Former names: Playhouse Disney (2005–2011); Disney Junior (2011–2020)

Links
- Website: disneyjunior.it

Disney Jr. is an Italian pay television channel that was owned and operated by The Walt Disney Company Italy. It launched as Playhouse Disney on 1 May 2005 and was renamed Disney Junior on 14 May 2011. It was available on pay TV via Sky Italia and Mediaset Premium (until 30 September 2016). It ceased broadcasting on 1 May 2020, and relaunched on 1 December 2025.

== History ==
Initially, like in the United States, Playhouse Disney was a programming block on Disney Channel, airing from 8:30am to 12:30pm.

An independent Playhouse Disney channel launched on 1 May 2005, Sky (channel 611 of the Primo Sky package), becoming the fourth Disney-branded channel to launch. This coincided with the launch of four new channels on the platform that same day. During commercial breaks, the Bocconcini presenters announced the following program. In 2008, these segments were replaced by Ooh, Aah & You. At 9pm, the channel initially aired the Goodbye Song from Bear in the Big Blue House followed by a good night message. It was later replaced by a new song featuring the Playhouse Disney Europe characters Whiffle & Fuzz (Frù and Pelù), La canzone della buonanotte. These songs did not mean the nightly closedown of the channel, as programming continued at 9:10pm.

On 8 December 2008, the channel launched on Mediaset Premium through the Mediaset 1 multiplex as part of the new Premium Fantasy package of kids channels.

On 31 July 2009, Playhouse Disney + launched on Sky, as a 25-minute timeshift.

In 2010, it launched Playhouse Disney Live!, a stage show featuring the characters of the channel's key shows.

On 14 May 2011, as part of a global rebranding plan, the channel was renamed Disney Junior.

In October 2019, Disney Junior began broadcasting in Switzerland, replacing Disney XD, However on 1 April 2020, the channel would also stop airing in Switzerland.

Disney Junior and its timeshift ceased broadcasting on 1 May 2020, due to Disney failing to renew a deal with Sky Italy, with content moving to Disney+. The channel was relaunched on 1 December 2025, using the current Disney Jr. branding introduced in 2024.

== Logos ==
2005–2011

2019–2020

2025–present

== See also ==
- Disney Channel (international)
- Disney Jr. (international)
- Disney XD (international)
