= Sky Voices (TV channel) =

Italian television channel

- Country: Italy

Programming
- Language: Italian
- Picture format: 576i (SDTV); 1080i (HD)

Ownership
- Owner: Sky Italia

History
- Launched: 2 November 2026; 19 days ago

Availability

Streaming media
- Sky Go: Sky Voices
- Now: Sky Voices

Sky Voices is an Italian entertainment channel owned and operated by Sky Italia. The channel was launched on 2 November 2026 in Italy.
