= Fox Animation =

Fox Animation may refer to:

- 20th Century Animation, formerly 20th Century Fox Animation, an animation division of the Walt Disney Studios
  - Blue Sky Studios, a former subsidiary of 20th Century Fox Animation.
  - Fox Animation Studios, a former division of 20th Century Fox Animation
- Animation Domination, an animated programming block airing from 2005 to 2014 on the U.S. Fox TV network
- Fox Animation, a television channel in Italy owned by Fox Networks Group, dedicated to animated series
