= List of programmes broadcast by Fox (Italian TV channel) =

This is a list of television programs broadcast by Fox in Italy until it was shut down on July 1st 2022.

== Comedy ==
- 'Til Death
- According to Jim
- The Fresh Prince of Bel-Air
- Friends
- Glee
- How I Met Your Mother
- Less than Perfect
- Lincoln Heights
- New Girl
- The Office
- Sabrina, the Teenage Witch
- Scrubs

== Drama ==
- 24
- 24: Legacy
- 24: Live Another Day
- 7th Heaven
- 90210
- Burn Notice
- Dexter
- Dirty Sexy Money
- Friday Night Lights
- Greek
- Genius
- House
- The Hot Zone
- Last Resort
- Lie to Me
- The Listener
- Lost
- Mental
- The O.C.
- October Road
- Party of Five
- Prison Break
- Runaway
- The Secret Life of the American Teenager
- South of Nowhere
- Veronica Mars
- The Walking Dead
- The West Wing

== Science fiction ==
- The 4400
- Angel
- Battlestar Galactica
- Buffy the Vampire Slayer
- Charmed
- The Dead Zone
- Dollhouse
- The Dresden Files
- Eureka
- Falling Skies
- FlashForward
- The Gates
- Harper's Island
- Kyle XY
- No Ordinary Family
- Reaper
- Roswell
- Sleepy Hollow
- Smallville
- Stargate Atlantis
- Stargate SG-1
- Supernatural
- Teen Wolf
- Terra Nova
- Tru Calling
- True Blood
- The X-Files

== Animation ==
- American Dad!
- Bob's Burgers
- The Cleveland Show
- Clone High
- Family Guy
- Futurama
- King of the Hill
- The Simpsons (seasons 1-27)
