= Glob =

Glob may refer to:

== People ==
- Lotte Glob (born 1944), Danish ceramic artist living in Scotland
- Niels Glob (died 1498), Catholic prelate and Bishop of Viborg
- Peter Glob (1911–1985), Danish archaeologist
- Glob Herman (Robert Herman), a fictional mutant character in American comic books published by Marvel Comics

== Science and technology ==
- glob (programming), a mini-language used for pattern matching of file and folder paths
- Luna-Glob, a Moon-exploration program by the Russian Federal Space Agency (Roscosmos)
- Glob (visual system), millimeter areas in the brain that process color

== Media ==
- The Glob, a 1952 children's book concerning the evolution of man written by John O'Reilly and illustrated by Walt Kelly
- Glob (TV series), an Italian comedy series
- Glob (comics), multiple fictional characters in the Marvel Comics universe
- The Boston Globe, a Boston newspaper
- Glob, one of the heads of the four-faced deity Grob Gob Glob Grod from Adventure Time
