= Sky Collection =

Italian television channel

- Logo used since 2025
- Country: Italy

Programming
- Language: Italian
- Picture format: 576i (SDTV); 1080i (HD)

Ownership
- Owner: Sky Italia
- Sister channels: Sky Uno; Sky Atlantic; Sky Investigation; Sky Serie

History
- Launched: 1 November 2025; 12 months ago

Availability

Streaming media
- Sky Go: Sky Collection
- Now: Sky Collection

Sky Collection is an Italian entertainment channel owned and operated by Sky Italia. The channel was launched on 1 November 2025 in Italy.

== See also ==
- Sky Atlantic (Italy)
