= Fox Life (Italy) =

Defunct italian television channel

- Country: Italy

Programming
- Language: Italian
- Picture format: 576i (16:9 SDTV); 1080i (HDTV)
- Timeshift service: Fox Life +1; Fox Life +2

Ownership
- Owner: Fox Networks Group Italy (Walt Disney Direct-to-Consumer & International)
- Sister channels: Fox, Fox Crime, FX, Fox Retro

History
- Launched: 13 May 2004; 22 years ago
- Closed: 1 July 2020; 6 years ago

Links
- Website: FoxLife.it Defunct

Fox Life was a television channel in Italy that was owned by Fox Networks Group Italy. The channel primarily targets women.

Two time-shifted versions of the channel, called Fox Life +1 and Fox Life +2, broadcast the same programming an hour later or two hours later. On February 1, 2012, a high-definition simulcast called Fox Life HD premiered.

The channel closed on 1 July 2020.

== Programming ==
The schedule contained drama series, reality shows, lifestyle magazines and documentaries. Programmes were both foreign imports and Italian productions.

=== Final ===
Programmes that are shown upon closure include:

- Castle
- Grey's Anatomy
- Nina
- Outlander
- The Good Doctor
- The Resident
- This Is Us

=== Former ===
Programmes that are no longer shown include:

- 9-1-1
- Accidentally on Purpose
- Ally McBeal
- Army Wives
- The Big C
- Big Love
- Body of Proof
- Bones
- Brothers & Sisters
- The Carrie Diaries
- The Client List
- Close to Home
- Cold Case
- Cougar Town
- Crossing Jordan
- Desperate Housewives
- Dharma & Greg
- Drop Dead Diva
- ER
- Extreme Makeover (Dubbed in Italian)
- Ghost Whisperer
- Gilmore Girls
- The Good Wife
- Hope & Faith
- Hot in Cleveland
- In Plain Sight
- Judging Amy
- Lip Service
- Lipstick Jungle
- Medium
- The Millionaire Matchmaker (dubbed in Italian)
- Missing
- My Wife and Kids
- The Nanny
- Nanny 911
- Nashville
- Necessary Roughness
- Private Practice
- Revenge
- Samantha Who?
- Satisfaction
- Scandal
- Secret Diary of a Call Girl
- Sex and the City
- The Simple Life (dubbed in Italian)
- Ugly Betty
- Will & Grace
- Witches of East End
