= Sky TG24 =

- Logo used since 2021

Programming
- Picture format: 576i (SDTV); 1080i (HDTV)

Ownership
- Owner: Sky Italia
- Sister channels: Sky Meteo 24; Sky News; Sky TG24 Primo Piano

History
- Launched: 31 August 2003

Links
- Website: tg24.sky.it

Availability

Terrestrial
- Digital (Italy): LCN 50

Streaming media
- Sky.it: Free streaming on live
- Sky Go: Streaming
- Now: Sky TG24

Sky TG24 is an Italian all-news TV channel, owned by Sky Italia.

Launched on 31 August 2003, it provides non-stop rolling news, weather forecasts and sports stories with half-hourly updates.

== Overview ==
Some of Sky TG24's programming is available on the television channels Cielo and TV8.

In the United States, Sky TG24 is available on cable via RCN in Boston, Chicago, New York City, Philadelphia and Washington D.C.. From December 2004 to 7 December 2008 it was available via satellite on DirecTV. It was removed due to low subscriber levels.

The channel has been available in high definition since September 2013, making it the 63rd HDTV channel offered by Sky Italia.

=== Related Services ===
==== Sky TG24 Primo Piano ====
Sky TG24 Primo Piano
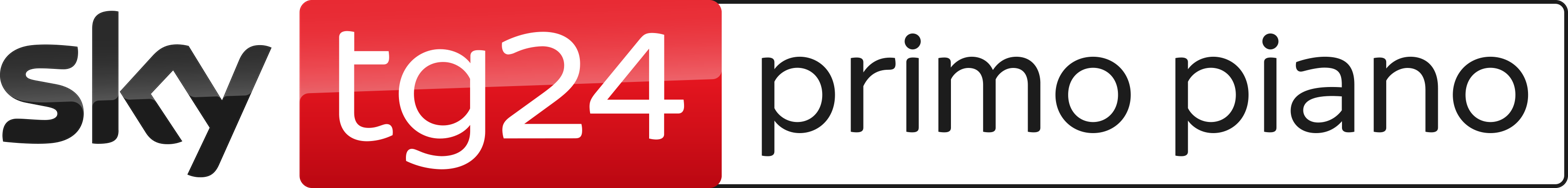
- Logo used since 2021

Programming
- Picture format: 576i (SDTV)

Ownership
- Owner: Sky Italia
- Sister channels: Sky TG24; Sky Meteo 24; Sky News

History
- Launched: 8 November 2010

Availability

Streaming media
- Sky Go: Streaming

Sky TG24 Primo Piano a 24-hour headline news service, featuring 10 most important news every 15 minutes. Live on channel 501.

==== Sky Meteo 24 ====
Sky Meteo 24 is a 24-hour weather forecast service, with national and European weather every 15 minutes. Live on channel 502.

=== Closed Services and Channels ===
A local Canadian version of Sky TG24 aired in Canada until 2018. It was owned by Telelatino Network Inc. Most of its content was simulcast with the Italian channel, with Canadian content.

Sky TG24 Active An interactive version of Sky TG24. It provided video on demand of news and sports news, the Sky TG24 live stream, and access to Sky Meteo 24 ACTIVE. The service at times included polls relating to important issues which viewers could vote on using their remote control.

Closed on September 16, 2019.

Sky TG24 Eventi The channel provided interviews and in-depth reports on the day's issues.

Closed on September 16, 2019.

Sky TG24 Rassegna The channel filled in the content of the main channel Sky TG24, with press reviews from 7am.

Closed on September 16, 2019.

== Editor-in-chief ==
- 2003-2011 - Emilio Carelli
- 2011-2018 - Sarah Varetto
- 2019-2025 - Giuseppe De Bellis
- 2025-present - Fabio Vitale

== Logos ==
2003–2010

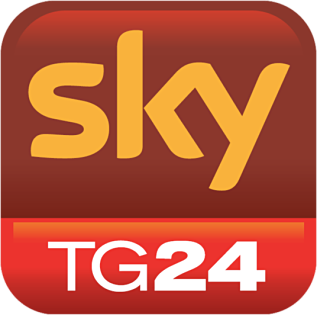
2010-2016 [(taken from the app) old version]

2016-2018

2018-2021

2021-current
