= Sky Cinema Stories =

- Logo used since 2025
- Country: Italy
- Broadcast area: Italy
- Headquarters: Rome

Programming
- Language: Italian
- Picture format: 1080i (HDTV)

Ownership
- Owner: Sky Italia
- Sister channels: List of Sky Cinema channels

History
- Launched: 1 May 1998 (as CNI); 1 January 2006 (as Cult); 1 September 2012 (as Sky Cinema Cult); 8 March 2019 (as Sky Cinema Due); 7 December 2025 (as Sky Cinema Stories)
- Former names: Cult Network Italia (1998–2005); Cult (2006–2012); Sky Cinema Cult (2012–2019); Sky Cinema Due (2019–2025)

Links
- Website: Channel guide

Availability

Streaming media
- Sky Go: Sky Cinema Stories
- Now: Sky Cinema Stories

Sky Cinema Stories is a high-definition satellite television channel on the Sky Italia platform in Italy.

Sky Cinema Due was originally called Cult Network Italia (CNI); in 2006, the name was shortened to Cult. In 2012, the channel was rebranded to Sky Cinema Cult, in 2019 to Sky Cinema Due and in 2025 to Sky Cinema Stories.

Following its launch in 1998, Cult Network Italia was twice named Best Thematic Cultural Arts Channel in Europe at the Annual European Satellite Awards.

== History ==
Cult Network Italia debuted on 1 April 1998 on the commercial pay-TV television platform Stream TV, positioning itself as a cultural channel aimed at an educated audience. In 1999 and 2002 it won the Hot Bird TV Awards as the best thematic channel in Europe in the culture category.

Since 1 August 2011, Cult has been managed directly by Sky Cinema rather than by Fox International Channels Italy.

From 1 September 2012, Cult became Sky Cinema Cult and began broadcasting in high definition under the name Sky Cinema Cult HD, moving to channel position 314.

== See also ==
- Sky Cinema
- Television in Italy
