= Sky Classica =

Italian classical music television channel

- Type: Classical music
- Country: Italy

Programming
- Language: Italian
- Picture format: 1080i (HDTV)

Ownership
- Owner: Sky Italia and Italia Classica S.r.l.
- Key people: Piero Maranghi (director)

History
- Launched: 1997
- Former names: Classica (1997–2013); Classica HD (2013–2025)

Links
- Website: piuclassica.it

Sky Classica is an Italian television channel dedicated to classical music. It broadcasts on channel 121 of the Sky Italia platform, including Sky Glass and Sky Stream. The channel broadcasts 24 hours a day, with programming consisting of opera, concerts, chamber music, classical and contemporary dance, documentaries, interviews, films, jazz and other music-related content.

== History ==
On 5 December 2012, Classica broadcast a live high-definition performance of Giuseppe Verdi's La traviata from the Teatro di San Carlo in Naples.

On 14 June 2013, the channel broadcast a live high-definition performance of Verdi's Aida from the Arena di Verona.

On 10 October 2013, the channel became available to all Sky subscribers and switched permanently to high-definition television, adopting a new logo and on-screen graphics. It was also moved to channel 131. The standard-definition version ceased broadcasting on the same date.

On 1 February 2025, Classica HD was renamed Sky Classica, becoming part of Sky's portfolio of branded television channels. The rebranding also saw the channel move to channel 124 on Sky Italia and channel 125 on Sky Glass and Sky Stream.

== Logos ==
The channel has used several logos under its successive names:

22 June 2017 – 31 January 2025

Since 1 February 2025

== See also ==
- Stingray Classica
- Sky Italia
