= Next:HD =

Ownership
- Owner: Fox International Channels Italy

History
- Launched: July 10, 2006
- Closed: June 30, 2009

Next:HD was an Italian high-definition satellite TV channel available in Italy as part of the SKY HD package on the SKY Italia satellite service. The channel launched on July 10, 2006 and closed on June 30, 2009, replaced by FOX HD.
