= Sky Meteo 24 =

- Logo used since 2021

Programming
- Picture format: 16:9 (576i, SDTV)

Ownership
- Owner: Sky Italia (Sky)
- Sister channels: Sky TG24; Sky TG24 Primo Piano; Sky News

History
- Launched: 1 August 2004

Links
- Website: meteo.sky.it

Sky Meteo 24 is the first Italian television channel dedicated exclusively to weather forecasts, it was launched on 1 August 2004, owned by Sky Italia. It airs quarter-hourly full forecasts.

== Products during bulletin ==
Segment title	Description
Previsioni nazionali	A look up at Italian weather forecasts. First (start bulletin) is 3-day forecast (for national), then followed by 5-day forecast (for each cities).
Temperature massime	Maximum temperatures’ forecast of the day.
Mappe meteo	Viewing from the satellite.
Il tempo in montagna	5-day outlook for all mountains across Italy.
Coste italiane	5-day outlook for all beach resorts across Italy.
Previsioni mondiali	World’s 5/7-day forecast.
Previsioni europee	Europe's 5-day forecast.
Eventi meteo	World weather stories.

== Logos ==
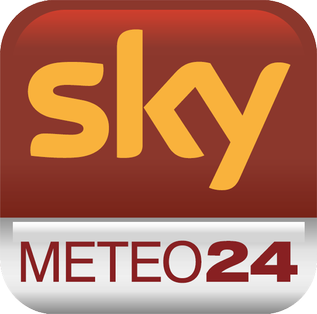
1 August 2004 - 27 June 2010	28 June 2010 - 14 June 2016 (taken from the app)	15 June 2016 - 1 July 2018	2 July 2018 - 14 June 2021	14 June 2021 - present
