= Fox Crime (Italy) =

Defunct Italian television station

- Country: Italy

Programming
- Languages: Italian; English
- Picture format: 1080i HDTV
- Timeshift service: Fox Crime +1

Ownership
- Owner: Fox Networks Group Italy (Walt Disney Direct-to-Consumer & International)
- Sister channels: Fox, Fox Life, FX, Fox Retro, National Geographic Channel, NatGeo Wild, NatGeo Adventure, NatGeo Music

History
- Launched: 31 October 2005; 20 years ago
- Closed: 1 July 2021; 4 years ago

Links
- Website: FoxCrime.it

Fox Crime was an Italian pay television channel owned by Fox Networks Group Italy, dedicated to broadcast crime series.

A time-shift channel called Fox Crime +1, which broadcast the same programmes an hour later, was launched on 1 May 2007. On 1 June 2009, a HD simulcast called Fox Crime HD was launched. In November 2010, a second time-shift channel, Fox Crime +2, was introduced. On 1 July 2021, the channel closed.

== Programming ==
The main staples were major American crime series, most of which could be seen on the channel, including many series from the Law & Order and CSI franchise. The channel also featured older cult series, British crime series and original Italian, French, and German productions.

Programmes shown include:

- Bull
- Columbo
- Criminal Minds
- CSI: Crime Scene Investigation
- CSI: Miami
- CSI: NY
- Derrick
- Death in Paradise
- Family Law
- Fast Forward
- Law & Order
- Law & Order: Criminal Intent
- Law & Order: Special Victims Unit
- Law & Order: UK
- Major Crimes
- Midsomer Murders
- Murder, She Wrote
- N.C.I.S.
- N.C.I.S.: Los Angeles
- New Tricks
- Numbers
- Perry Mason
- Prime Suspect
- The Blacklist
- The Body Farm
- The Killing
- The Protector
- Unforgettable
- Without a Trace
