= Tom Mockridge =

- Born: July 1955; New Zealand

Thomas Mockridge (born July 1955 in New Zealand) is the chairman and chief executive officer of Virgin Fibra. Prior to founding the italian-based broadband operator, he has been CEO of Virgin Media until June 2019, CEO of News International until December 2012, and the foundation CEO of Sky Italia until July 2011.

== Career ==
=== Early days ===
Mockridge began his career in his native New Zealand; starting in 1977 as a reporter for the New Plymouth-based Taranaki Daily News in the small central North Island town of Taumarunui.

He moved to Australia in 1980, working first for the Sydney Morning Herald as economics correspondent, then as an adviser for the Australian Treasurer Paul Keating. He also worked for The Australian. He joined News Limited in January 1991, where he was assistant CEO to Ken Cowley until 1996. He then became CEO of Foxtel, a post which he held for three years. Mockridge then moved to Hong Kong.

Appointed managing director of Independent Newspapers in 2001, New Zealand's largest newspaper publisher and a subsidiary of News Corporation, he was also appointed Chairman of pay TV group Sky New Zealand.

=== Sky Italia ===
In 2002, Mockridge led the merger between Stream TV and Tele+, which resulted in the creation of Sky Italia. On completion of the merger, he was appointed CEO of Sky Italia. In 2008 Mockridge was appointed managing director of European Television (all News Corps TV assets outside the UK), reporting to James Murdoch. He was later appointed to the board of British Sky Broadcasting, a position he still holds.

He was head of Sky Italia when he replaced Rebekah Brooks as chief executive of News International after she had resigned on 15 July 2011.

=== News International ===
On 17 January 2012 he appeared before the Leveson Inquiry into media ethics. He eventually backed Lord Justice Brian Leveson's recommendation that the UK set up a regulatory system for reining in the British media's worst excesses.

In December 2012 he resigned from his position as head of Murdoch's UK newspapers.

=== Virgin Media ===
In June 2013 he took up the post of chief executive of Virgin Media, following the completion of the takeover by Liberty Global and leaving in 2019 to be replaced by Lutz Schuler.

=== Virgin Fibra ===
Returning to Italy, in August 2020 he founded Virgin Fibra with two other partners, and was later joined by other entrepreneurs and businessmen. After two years of startup activity, the business launched on 17 August 2022 and is now part of the Virgin Group, becoming the third company ever in Italy to carry the brand of Richard Branson.

Virgin Fibra runs as a fixed broadband operator in the Italian telco industry, specialising in exclusively FTTP broadband service in partnership with Open Fiber. Its services are available throughout the country to both private customers and SMEs.

== Personal life ==
His wife is an Italian citizen. They have two children.

Business positions
Preceded by Neil Berkett	Chief Executive of Virgin Media; June 2013 - June 2019	Succeeded by Lutz Schuler
Preceded by Rebekah Brooks	Chief Executive of News UK; September 2011 - December 2012	Succeeded by Mike Darcey
Preceded by New company	Chief Executive of Sky Italia; 2003 - 2011	Succeeded by
Preceded by	Managing Director of Independent Newspapers; 2001 - 2002	Succeeded by
Preceded by	Chief Executive of Foxtel; 1997 - 2000	Succeeded by
