= 2010 Acre time zone referendum =

Acre state time zone referendum
- 31 October 2010
- Are you in favor of the recent change of legal time zone promoted in your state?
- Outcome: Time zone in the state of Acre and part of Amazonas returned to UTC-05:00.; Federal Law no. 11,662/2008 repealed.

Results
Choice	Votes	%
Yes	139,891	43.13%
No	184,478	56.87%
Valid votes	324,369	96.56%
Invalid or blank votes	11,552	3.44%
Total votes	335,921	100.00%
Registered voters/turnout	470,560	71.39%

Time in Brazil, since 25 April 2019. Time in Brazil: ACT / Acre Time / UTC−5 / (BRT–2); AMT / Amazon Time / UTC−4 / (BRT−1); BRT / Brasília Time / UTC−3 / (BRT); FNT / Fernando de Noronha Time / UTC−2 / (BRT+1)

The 2010 Acre referendum consisted of a decision regarding maintaining the time zone change for the Brazilian state of Acre, as the state had an 1-hour difference from Brasília Time (UTC-03:00) in 2008, when the original time zone had minus 2 hours from Brasília.

== History ==
In 1913, Executive Order 2,784 was signed, which instituted the first time zones in Brazil. According to paragraph d, in joint interpretation with paragraph c, Acre and the area west of the line which connects the municipalities of Tabatinga and Porto Acre, was incorporated as part of the "fourth zone", characterized by GMT-5 (current UTC-05:00). Almost a century after the change, Federal Law no. 11,662 of 2008 was signed, which, along with another change in the state of Pará (inserting it totally in the Brasília Regional Time), made the state of Acre and southwest Amazonas advance the time by one hour, to the UTC-04:00 time zone, on 23 June 2008.

== Reasons for change ==
The time zone change was proposed by then Senator Tião Viana (PT-AC), who defended the change by stating that the time difference between Acre and nearby states jeopardized the state economically and culturally. After the referendum, the Abert (Brazilian Association of Radio and Television Broadcasters) opposed the return to the previous time, owing to scheduling adjustments that would be required after the institution of the Brazilian advisory rating system by the Ministry of Justice in 2007.

== The referendum and its effects ==
The referendum was held on 31 October 2010, on the same day of the second round of the 2010 presidential election. The majority of the population decided to choose to return to the previous time zone, which had a 2-hour difference from Brasília Regional Time.

The provisions of the referendum did not immediately commence due to doubts of the validity of the referendum by certain political elements and pressure from TV broadcasters that stalled its implementation for almost three years after the referendum had taken place. The change was finally approved by the Federal Senate committees in September 2013.

As consequence, the Federal Law no. 12,876/2013 reestablished the previous time in Acre and southwest Amazonas, repealing the Federal Law no. 11,662/2008. The regions covered by the change returned to the old time zone at midnight on Sunday, 10 November 2013.

== Result ==
As officially published by Electoral Justice, the result of Acre referendum was the following:

2010 Acre time zone referendum
Choice	Votes	%
For	139,891	43.13
Against	184,478	56.87
Total	324,369	100.00
Valid votes	324,369	96.56
Invalid/blank votes	11,552	3.44
Total votes	335,921	100.00
Registered voters/turnout	470,560	71.39
Source: Superior Electoral Court

Acre time zone referendum results
No: 184,478 (57%)	Yes: 139,891 (43%)
▲
