= Sky Cinema (Italian TV channel) =

- Logo used since 2020
- Country: Italy
- Broadcast area: Italy; Vatican City; San Marino

Programming
- Language: Italian
- Picture format: 576i (16:9 SDTV); 1080i (HDTV)

Ownership
- Owner: Sky Italia
- Sister channels: Sky Primafila

Sky Cinema is an Italian set of premium movie channels owned by Sky Italia.

== Channels ==
The Sky Cinema package includes ten Sky Italia-branded channels.

EPG	Logo	Channel name	History
110, 301		Sky Cinema Uno	Sky Cinema Uno started July 31, 2003. Until November 4, 2016, it was called Sky Cinema 1.
302		Sky Cinema Stories	Sky Cinema Stories, formerly known as Sky Cinema Due, Sky Cinema Cult, Cult and Cult Network Italia, it has been under Sky management since August 2011.
303		Sky Cinema Collection	Sky Cinema Collection start on March 1, 2008, as Sky Cinema Hits, replacing Sky Cinema 16:9. From July 20, 2009, it is also available in HD.
304		Sky Cinema Family	Sky Cinema Family started on December 20, 2008. On April 1, 2010, it started to broadcast in HD.
305		Sky Cinema Action	Formerly Sky Cinema Max, transmission started on July 20, 2009.
306		Sky Cinema Suspense	—
307		Sky Cinema Romance	Formerly Sky Cinema Passion, started airing March 1, 2011.
308		Sky Cinema Drama	—
309		Sky Cinema Comedy	Started airing on March 1, 2011, replacing Sky Cinema Italia.
310		Sky Cinema Uno +24	Currently a timeshift channel, until December 20, 2008, it was called Sky Cinema 3 and then Sky Cinema +24.

=== Sky Cinema Uno ===
Sky Cinema Uno is the flagship channel. This channel shows the first viewing of films after there time in cinema that Sky have the rights to. Until November 4, 2016, it was called Sky Cinema 1.

==== Sky Cinema Uno +24 ====
Sky Cinema Uno +24 retransmits the schedule of the Sky Cinema Uno channel 24 hours after the main channel. Until December 20, 2008, it was called Sky Cinema 3, later becoming Sky Cinema +24. Following the Sky #IoRestoACasa initiative, from April 4 to May 26, 2020, the channel is renamed to Sky Cinema #IoRestoACasa 1 and from May 27 to June 30, 2020, it was renamed to Sky Cinema per te 1.

=== Sky Cinema Stories ===
Sky Cinema Stories, formerly known as Sky Cinema Due, Sky Cinema Cult, Cult and Cult Network Italia, is the channel dedicated to cinema d'author and to independent productions. It has been managed by Sky Cinema since August 2011.

==== Sky Cinema Due +24 ====
Sky Cinema Due +24, born on March 8, 2019, retransmits the schedule of the Sky Cinema Due channel postponed by 24 hours. Following the Sky #IoRestoACasa initiative, from April 4 to May 26, 2020, the channel is renamed to Sky Cinema #IoRestoACasa 2 while from May 27 to June 30, 2020, it will be renamed to Sky Cinema per te 2.

From August 12, to September 17, 2020, the channel became Sky Cinema per te.

From 7 December, 2025, Sky Cinema Due +24 now closed.

=== Sky Cinema Collection ===
Sky Cinema Collection was born on March 1, 2008, as Sky Cinema Hits. It was also formerly Sky Cinema 16:9 which broadcast in the then new 16:9 ratio.

Under the current name, the channel is dedicated to film reviews and collections/ franchises including:

- Sky Cinema Christmas each year for Christmas, it broadcasts Christmas-themed films.
- Sky Cinema 007 started for the 50th anniversary of the first James Bond film (Agent 007 – License to kill) and subsequently revived each year each, it broadcasts all James Bond films.
- Sky Cinema Oscars each year around the Night of the Oscars, broadcasts films that have received at least one Oscar.

And occasionally becomes:

- Sky Cinema Star Wars, films and documentaries.
- Sky Cinema Princesses broadcasts films related to Disney Princess.
- Sky Cinema Wedding
- Sky Cinema Saga of the Ring, broadcasts The Lord of the Rings and The Hobbit saga films.
- Sky Cinema Heroes broadcasts superhero films Marvel and DC.
- Sky Cinema Disney Pixar broadcasts Disney Pixar movies.
- Sky Cinema David di Donatello On the occasion of the David di Donatello, it broadcasts all the winning films of the David di Donatello.
- Sky Cinema 3D Vintage broadcast the 22 most important films in the history of cinema.
- Sky Cinema Rocky broadcasts all films in the Rocky film series.
- Sky Cinema Planet of the Apes
- Sky Cinema Shrek broadcasts all the films of the saga of Shrek.
- Sky Cinema Disney Pirates of the Caribbean
- Sky Cinema Women Collection
- Sky Cinema Agatha Christie with films based on the novels of the British writer.
- Sky Cinema Sergio Leone with a review of films directed by the director thirty years after his death.
- Sky Cinema Back to the Future
- Sky Cinema Spider-Man
- Sky cinema Men in Black broadcasts Men in Black films.
- Sky Cinema DreamWorks broadcasts DreamWorks Animation films.
- Sky Cinema Sci-Fi broadcasts films of sci-fi genre.

=== Sky Cinema Family ===
Sky Cinema Family started airing on December 20, 2008, broadcasting films of different genres each day including: comedies, animated films, teen-comedies, blockbusters and films from the eighties and nineties. There will be a female audience each Friday in prime time and cycles focusing on the stars of Hollywood. From April 1, 2010, broadcasts in HD begin. From December 3, 2011, to June 30, 2019, each weekend broadcast, the channel time shared with Disney Cinemagic.

=== Sky Cinema Action ===
Sky Cinema Action, formerly Sky Cinema Max, is the channel that mainly offering action films. These include science fiction, horror, espionage, thriller in themed cycles. From July 20, 2009, is also available in HD.

=== Sky Cinema Suspense ===
Sky Cinema Suspense is the channel dedicated to thriller, crime, horror and noir films.

=== Sky Cinema Romance ===
Sky Cinema Romance, formerly Sky Cinema Passion, is the channel dedicated mainly to films of love, romance and passion, which started on March 1, 2011.

=== Sky Cinema Drama ===
Sky Cinema Drama is the channel dedicated to dramas and biographies.

=== Sky Cinema Comedy ===
Sky Cinema Comedy is the channel dedicated to comedies, from international cult, Italian, American and British Comedy. The channel is started broadcasting on March 1, 2011, replacing Sky Cinema Italia.
