= Nat Geo People =

Global pay television channel

- Country: Singapore, India
- Broadcast area: International
- Headquarters: Asia: New Delhi; America: New York City; Europe: London

Programming
- Language: English
- Picture format: 1080i HDTV

Ownership
- Owner: National Geographic Partners (Walt Disney Television)
- Sister channels: National Geographic; Nat Geo Wild; National Geographic Abu Dhabi

History
- Launched: 1 November 1999; 27 years ago 1 June 2011; 15 years ago (Malaysia); 1 February 2014; 12 years ago (Turkey); March 1, 2014; 12 years ago (Italy); 5 April 2014; 12 years ago (Germany); 31 August 2015; 11 years ago (Malaysia); 1 September 2015; 11 years ago (Romania, 1st launch); 1 October 2015; 11 years ago (Poland); 18 February 2020; 6 years ago (Romania, 2nd launch)
- Closed: 12 September 2017; 9 years ago (Germany); 1 March 2018; 8 years ago (Australia); 1 July 2018; 8 years ago (Romania, 1st launch); 1 October 2019; 7 years ago (Italy); 31 May 2020; 6 years ago (Turkey); 2 July 2020; 6 years ago (SD, Brunei); 1 October 2021; 5 years ago (Middle East and Asia); 1 October 2026; 46 days ago (Romania, 2nd launch)
- Replaced by: Nat Geo Wild (Europe)
- Former names: Adventure One Channel (1999-2003); Adventure One (A1) (2003–2007); Nat Geo Adventure (2007–2014)

Links
- Website: MENA:

Nat Geo People (short for National Geographic People) is an international pay television channel owned by National Geographic Partners, a joint venture between the Walt Disney Company (73%) and the National Geographic Society (27%). Targeted at female audiences, with programming focusing on people and cultures, the channel is available in 50 countries in both linear and non-linear formats.

== History ==
The channel originally launched in the United Kingdom on 1 November 1999 as Adventure One Channel by the NGC-UK Partnership, a joint venture between the National Geographic Society and British Sky Broadcasting (BSkyB). The channel was later launched by National Geographic across Europe, Asia, Africa, and Australasia, and was rebranded in 2003 to simply Adventure One (A1).

On 7 December 2006, it was announced that the channel would be replaced in the United Kingdom by Nat Geo Wild from 1 March 2007. The channel was replaced as planned, and was also replaced in most European territories as well. On 2 April 2007, National Geographic announced the launch of National Geographic Adventure, which replaced Adventure One in Asia, Africa, Australasia, and Italy, and as a block in Spain, Portugal, and Latin America. It was officially relaunched on 1 May 2007. Under its new name, the channel retained its focus on a younger audience, providing programming based around outdoor adventure, travel, and stories that involve people having fun while exploring the world. Nat Geo Adventure is also a global adventure travel video and photography portal, which launched worldwide in 2009.

In early 2008, National Geographic Adventure Australia and Italy launched a new video sharing feature on their website called Blognotes.

In 2010, Nat Geo Adventure launched its own HD feed in Asia via AsiaSat 5.

Nat Geo Adventure Italy upgraded to HD on Sky Italia on 1 February 2012, At the time of launch (0500 UTC).

On 30 September 2013, it was announced that Nat Geo Adventure would be replaced by Nat Geo People on 1 March 2014. This would see Nat Geo People launch in HD where currently available, as well as in linear and non-linear formats, in 50 countries internationally. The rebrand saw the channel become more female-focused, with programming focusing on people and cultures.

Nat Geo People was replaced by Nat Geo Wild in Germany and Austria on 12 September 2017. The channel was closed down in Australia on 1 March 2018, together with FX, with all popular TV shows moving to the National Geographic Channel. Nat Geo People in Italy closed on 1 October 2019, along with the Italian versions of Disney XD, Disney in English, Fox Comedy and Fox Animation, due to Sky Italia's deal with The Walt Disney Company Italy not being renewed. In Romania, the channel closed on 1 July 2018, but it was available again in 2020 until it closed again on October 1, 2026. The channel closed in Turkey on 31 May 2020. On April 27, 2021, for the 21 years of television broadcasting history, Disney and Fox Networks Group announced that Nat Geo People will be closing down and will be merging with National Geographic Asia (which would also ceased its broadcasting two years later) on 1 October 2021, as well as a part of its winddown of traditional cable/satellite networks across Southeast Asia and Hong Kong in favor of Disney+ (in Singapore, Hong Kong, Taiwan and the Philippines) and Disney+ Hotstar (in Southeast Asia outside Singapore and the Philippines), thus the channel space once occupied by Adventure One Channel ceased to exist. The final program aired was an episode of Airport Below Zero.

As of October 1, 2026, Poland is the only country where Nat Geo People is still active.

Adventure One (A1) logo used from 2003 until 30 April 2007

Nat Geo Adventure logo used from 1 May 2007 until 28 February 2014

Nat Geo People logo used since 1 March 2014

== Nat Geo People around the world ==
Channel	Country or region	Formerly	Launch year	Replacement / rebrand	Shutdown / rebrand date
Nat Geo People (Italy)	Italy	Nat Geo Adventure	March 1, 2014	discontinued	October 1, 2019
Nat Geo People (Turkiye)	Turkey	Nat Geo Adventure	February 1, 2014	discontinued	May 31, 2020
Nat Geo People (Poland)	Poland	Nat Geo Adventure	October 1, 2015	-	-
Nat Geo People (Romania)	Romania	Nat Geo Adventure	September 1, 2015 (1st launch) February 18, 2020 (2nd launch)	discontinued (1st and 2nd launch)	July 1, 2018 (1st launch) October 1, 2026 (2nd launch)
Nat Geo People (Middle East)	Middle East	Nat Geo Adventure	March 1, 2014	discontinued	October 1, 2021
Nat Geo People (Southeast Asia)	Southeast Asia	Nat Geo Adventure	March 1, 2014	discontuined	July 5, 2020 (Brunei) October 1, 2021
Nat Geo People (Germany)	Germany, Switzerland and Austria	Nat Geo Adventure	March 1, 2014	Nat Geo Wild	September 12, 2017
Nat Geo People (Australia)	Australia	Nat Geo Adventure	March 1, 2014	discontinued	March 1, 2018

== Programmes ==
- 62 Days at Sea
- Adventure Wanted
- Amazing Adventures of a Nobody
- Around the World for Free
- Art of Walking
- Banged Up Abroad
- The Best Job in the World
- Bite Me with Dr. Mike Leahy
- Bluelist Australia
- Bondi Rescue
- By Any Means
- Calcutta or Bust
- Chasing Che: Latin America on a Motorcycle
- Chasing Time
- City Chase
- City Chase Marrakech
- Cooking the World
- Cruise Ship Diaries
- Cycling Home from Siberia with Rob Lilwall
- Danger Men
- David Rocco's Amalfi Getaway
- David Rocco's Dolce Vita
- Deadliest Journeys
- Departures
- Delinquent Gourmet
- Destination Extreme
- Dive Detectives
- Don't Tell My Mother
- Earth Tripping
- Eccentric UK
- Endurance Traveller
- Exploring the Vine
- Extreme Tourist Afghanistan
- Finding Genghis
- First Ascent
- Food Lovers Guide to the Planet
- Food School
- The Frankincense Trail
- Geo Sessions
- Going Bush
- Gone to Save the Planet
- Graham's World
- The Green Way Up
- Into the Drink
- Keeping up with the Joneses
- Kimchi Chronicles
- Lonely Planet: Roads Less Travelled
- Long Way Down
- Madagascar Maverick
- Madventures
- Making Tracks
- Market Values
- Meet the Amish
- Meet the Natives
- Miracle on Everest
- Motorcycle Karma
- The Music Nomad
- Naked Lentil
- Nomads
- On Surfari
- On the Camino de Santiago
- One Man & His Campervan
- Perilous Journeys
- Pressure Cook
- Race to the Bottom of the Earth
- Racing Around the Clock
- Racing to America
- Reverse Exploration
- The Ride
- Sahara Sprinters
- Solo
- Somewhere in China
- The Surfer's Journal
- The Surgery Ship
- Travel Madness
- Treks in a Wild World
- Ultimate Traveller
- Warrior Road Trip
- Wedding Crasher: The Real Deal
- Weird and Wonderful Hotels
- Wheel2Wheel
- Which Way To
- Wild Ride
- Word Travels
- Word of Mouth
- A World Apart
- Young Global Hotshots

== See also ==
- National Geographic Channel
- National Geographic Channel Australia
