= Sky Primafila =

Italian telechannel

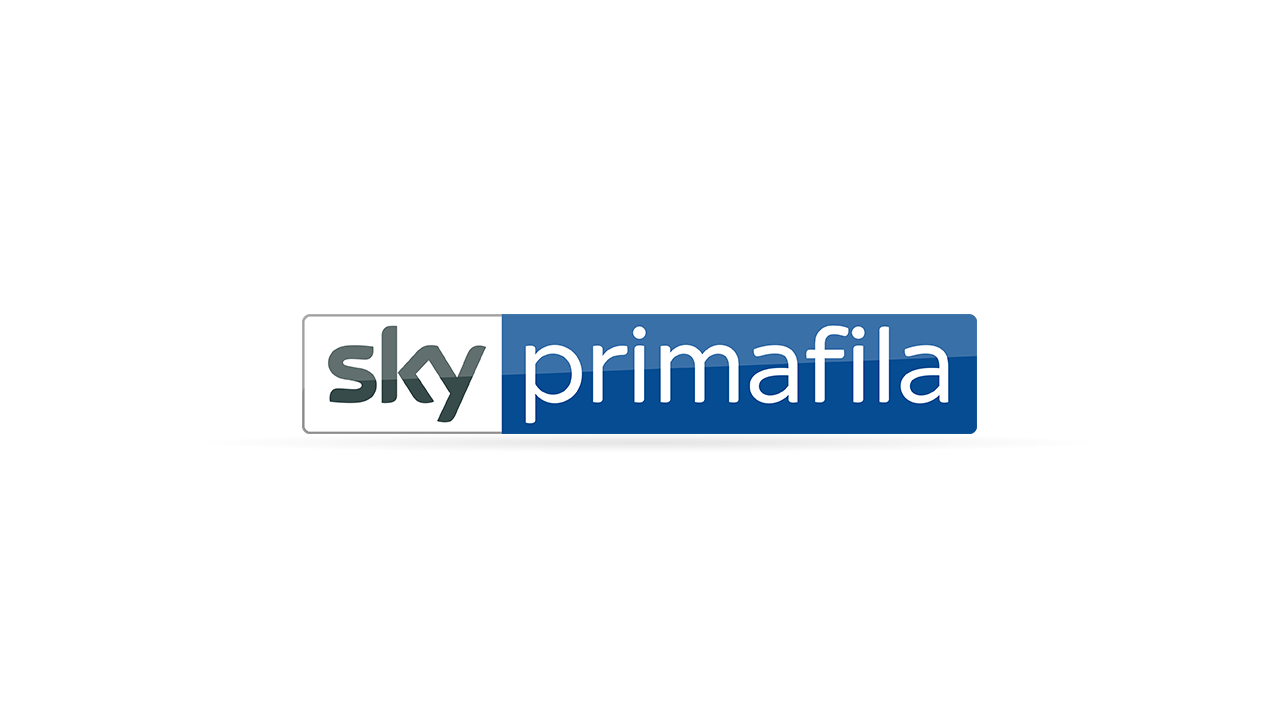

Sky Primafila is an Italian language Pay-Per-View Near Video On Demand service owned by Sky Italia and carried on its Satellite Pay TV service.

Launched in July 2003 with 17 channels, now counts 28 channels all offered in 16:9 Widescreen format. An HDTV service was launched on 3 April 2009 for 8 channels.
