= Glob (TV series) =

Glob is an Italian television comedy, airing on Rai 3 produced by Enrico Bertolino which addresses the language of communication used by the mass media and other such topics. The show offers numerous observations on the poor communication of television journalists. While the original run ended in 2010, it was revived in 2012 under the name Glob Spread.

== Sources and notes ==
- GLOB the obscene one of the village
- Glob - the Obscene one of the Village
