= Fox Retro =

- Country: Italy

Programming
- Language: Italian
- Picture format: 576i (4:3/16:9 SDTV)

Ownership
- Owner: Fox International Channels Italy (Fox International Channels Europe)

History
- Launched: 1 August 2009; 16 years ago
- Closed: 31 December 2014; 11 years ago

Links
- Website: foxretro.it

Fox Retro was an Italian television channel owned by Fox International Channels Italy. It feature older American television series from the 1970s, 1980s and 1990s. It was available with a Sky Italia subscription. It launched on August 1, 2009 and shut down on December 31, 2014.

== Programming ==
- All in the Family
- Alice
- Arsène Lupin
- Batman
- Baywatch
- Beverly Hills, 90210
- Cagney & Lacey
- Charles in Charge
- Charlie's Angels
- CHiPs
- Columbo
- Diff'rent Strokes
- Eight Is Enough
- Ellery Queen
- Family Affair
- Family Matters
- Family Ties
- Get Smart
- Gimme a Break!
- Growing Pains
- Happy Days
- Hawaii Five-O
- I Dream of Jeannie
- Knight Rider
- Lou Grant
- MacGyver
- Magnum, P.I.
- Man from Atlantis
- Miami Vice
- Mission: Impossible
- Mission: Impossible (1988 TV series)
- Moonlighting
- Mork & Mindy
- Perry Mason
- Police Woman
- Quincy, M.E.
- Remington Steele
- Rosie
- Scarecrow and Mrs. King
- Space: 1999
- Star Trek
- Starsky & Hutch
- T. J. Hooker
- The A-Team
- The Alfred Hitchcock Hour
- The Dukes of Hazzard
- The Facts of Life
- The Fresh Prince of Bel-Air
- The Golden Girls
- The Incredible Hulk
- The Jeffersons
- The Kidz Bop Kids
- The Love Boat
- The Lucy Show
- The Mary Tyler Moore Show
- The Nanny
- The Odd Couple
- The Persuaders!
- The Streets of San Francisco
- Three's Company
- UFO
- Wonder Woman
