= Sky Italia =

Italian satellite pay-television platform

Sky Italia S.r.l.
- Type: Subsidiary
- Industry: Telecommunications
- Founded: 31 July 2003; 23 years ago
- Founder: Rupert Murdoch
- Headquarters: Milan, Italy
- Area served: Italy; San Marino; Vatican City
- Key people: Andrea Duilio (CEO)
- Products: Direct-broadcast satellite OTT streaming television broadband provider MVNO
- Parent: Sky Group
- Subsidiaries: NOW S.r.l. Vision Distribution (joint venture with Cattleya, Wildside, Lucisano Media Group, Palomar and Indiana Production)
- Website: www.sky.it

Sky Italia S.r.l., trading as Sky, is an Italian satellite television platform owned by the American media conglomerate Comcast, via the British media conglomerate Sky Group. Sky Italia also broadcasts three national free-to-air television channels: TV8, Cielo, and Sky TG24. Pay TV services on the Sky Italia satellite platform are broadcast on the Hot Bird satellites at 13.0°E and are encrypted in NDS VideoGuard.

== History ==
Sky Italia was founded on 31 July 2003 by the merger of TELE+ and Stream TV. On 28 June 2010, Sky Italia changed its brands and logos, making them identical to the BSkyB ones. On 1 October 2010, Sky activated its first 3D channel, Sky Sport 3D, available without any extra cost to the Sport pack subscribers. The very first event Sky Sport 3D aired was the 2010 Ryder Cup. On 25 December 2010, Sky launched another 3D channel: Sky Cinema 3D, airing 3D movies, available for free for Cinema pack subscribers. These channels were replaced by Sky 3D on 6 September 2011, and then closed on 16 January 2018. Tom Mockridge, the then head of Sky Italia, replaced Rebekah Brooks as chief executive of News International after she resigned on 15 July 2011.

Andrea Zappia replaced Tom Mockridge as CEO on 1 August 2011. On 7 October 2011, Sky Italia announced it reached the 5 million subscribers benchmark. Following News Corporation's split into two on 28 June 2013, to create two separate companies, 21st Century Fox (the re-branded News Corporation), and the spin-off company New News Corp, the 100% stake held by News Corporation in Sky Italia was retained by the re-branded 21st Century Fox. Following media speculation, on 12 May 2014, Sky Italia's sister company, BSkyB, confirmed it was in talks with its largest shareholder, 21st Century Fox, about acquiring 21st Century Fox's 57.4% stake in Sky Deutschland and its 100% stake in Sky Italia. The enlarged company would likely be called "Sky Europe" and would consolidate 21st Century Fox's European digital TV assets into one company. The sale was announced on 25 July 2014, which was subject to regulatory and shareholder approval. The acquisition was completed on 13 November.

In 2016, Sky Italia created Vision Distribution, a film distribution venture with five Italian production companies: Wildside (owned by Fremantle), Cattleya (backed by ITV Studios), Lucisano Media Group, Palomar and Indiana Production. Since the beginning of August 2019, Universal Pictures, Sky's corporate cousin via NBCUniversal, has handled theatrical distribution for Vision's releases in Italy. On 20 January 2020, Vision launched their international sales arm, Vision Distribution International.

Since October 2018, Sky Italia, as well as Sky UK, Sky Ireland and Sky Deutschland, has been controlled by Comcast. On 1 October 2019, Maximo Ibarra replaced Andrea Zappia as CEO. Maximo Ibarra, however, left Sky Italia on 30 June 2021. On 16 June 2020, Sky Italia launched Sky Wifi, its ultra-broadband service. On 6 September 2021, Andrea Duilio started as the new CEO of Sky Italia.

== Timeline ==
=== 1998 ===
- December: Miro Allione, Stream's CEO, stated that News Corp signed a preliminary deal with Telecom Italia to buy 80% of Stream, but the introduction of a bill limiting the acquisition of soccer pay TV rights has made the company reconsider its plans.

=== 1999 ===
- April: 35% of Stream is acquired by News Corp.

=== 2002 ===
- June: TELE+ is acquired by News Corp.

=== 2003 ===
- March: the European Commission approves the merger between TELE+ and Stream TV.
- 31 July: Sky Italia is founded.
- 31 August: Sky TG24 is launched as a rolling news channel.

=== 2004 ===
- April: Sky Italia abandons SECA encryption system to switch to the NDS, managed by the News Corporation.
- 1 August: Sky launches weather news channel, Sky Meteo 24.
- November: Sky's subscribers reach 3 million.

=== 2005 ===
- May: Sky Italia are awarded the broadcast rights to the 2006 FIFA World Cup.
- November: Sky Italia launches the My Sky decoder with PVR functionality.

=== 2006 ===
- May: Sky launches its first high definition channels: Sky Cinema HD, Sky Sport HD, National Geographic Channel HD and Next:HD.
- December: Sky's subscribers reach 4 million.

=== 2007 ===
- April: Fox airs the first TV drama created by an Italian pay television channel, Boris.
- May: Sky are awarded the broadcast rights for Formula One for two and a half years.
- May: Cooltoon anime programming is launched.
- November: A selection of Sky channels become available via IPTV on Telecom Italia, Fastweb and Wind.

=== 2008 ===
- February: Sky are awarded the broadcast rights for the 2012 Summer Olympics.
- May: Sky launches My Sky HD.
- 30 August: Sky launches sports news channel, Sky Sport 24.
- December: VAT on subscriptions is increased from 10% to 20%.

=== 2009 ===
- January: Sky are awarded the broadcast rights for the FIFA Confederations Cup and the Six Nations Championship.
- April: Sky launches Sky Uno and Sky Primafila HD.
- August: Sky increases its high-definition offering to 12 channels.
- September: Sky announces the Sky Digital Key, a USB Key with terrestrial decoder functions.
- December:
  - Sky On Demand service launches.
  - Sky launches free-to-air channel Cielo.

=== 2010 ===
- January: All Serie A matches begin transmitting in high-definition.
- April: Sky launches three Sky Movies channels in high-definition, bringing the total number of HD channels to 25.
- June:
  - Sky changes its brand identity with a new logo, similar to that used by BSkyB.
  - Mondiali 1–4 launch for the 2010 FIFA World Cup.
- August: The number of high-definition channels reaches 36.
- October: The 2010 Ryder Cup final is the first sports event to be broadcast in 3D.
- November:
  - Sky's subscribers reach 4.8 million.

=== 2011 ===
- January: Avatar is the most watched film on Italian pay TV, with an audience of 1.3 million viewers.
- February: Sky are awarded the broadcast rights for the 2011 Copa América, 2011 and 2012 Copa Sudamericana and 2012 Copa Libertadores.
- March: Sky Cinema Passion and Sky Cinema Comedy launch.
- May: Sky are awarded the broadcast rights for X Factor.
- August: Sky launches Sky Go, an app which allows a number of Sky channels to be viewed on smartphones and tablets.
- September: Sky launches Sky 3D, the first 3D channel in Italy.
- October:
  - Sky's subscribers reach 5 million.
  - Sky Uno begins broadcasting in HD for the premiere of X Factor.
- December:
  - Sky's HD channels reach 40 with the launch of Eurosport 2 HD.

=== 2012 ===
- February:
  - 12 new HD channels are launched, Fox Life HD, Real Time HD, Extreme Sports Channel HD, ESPN America HD, Discovery Science HD, Discovery Travel & Living HD, History HD, Nat Geo Wild HD, Nat Geo Adventure HD, Gambero Rosso Channel HD, Disney Channel HD and MTV Live HD, bringing the total number of HD channels to 52.
  - Sky changes the operating system of My Sky HD.
- March: Sky Go becomes free and is made available for PC, OS X, iPhone and Android.
- May: Sky are awarded the broadcast rights for the Grand Prix motorcycle racing for the 2014, 2015, 2016, 2017 and 2018 seasons of MotoGP, Moto2 and Moto3 series.
- June:
  - Sky is awarded the broadcast rights for the Formula One and its feeder series (GP2, GP3 and Porsche Supercup) for the 2013, 2014 and 2015 seasons, with an option for the 2016 and 2017 seasons.
  - The launch of Sky Arts is announced.
- July:
  - Sky updates the On Demand service.
  - Sky are awarded the broadcast rights for the UEFA Champions League for the 2012–13 and 2013–14 seasons.
  - Sky adds 12 extra channels for the 2012 Summer Olympics.
- August: Sky's subscribers reach 4.9 million.
- September:
  - Sky TG24 receives an on-screen rebrand.
  - Sky adds two more high definition channels: DeA Sapere HD and Disney XD HD.
- October: Planet Kids, a new channel for kids, is launched.
- November:
  - 1: Sky Arts launches in HD, bringing the total number of HD channels to 58.
  - Sky Go is updated to include three more channels and Sky On Demand.

=== 2013 ===
- February: Sky's subscribers fall to 4.83 million.
- March: Sky are awarded the broadcast rights for the Bundesliga for two seasons. Sky launches the Sky Sport F1.
- 3 April: Cielo launches in HD.
- May: Sky's subscribers fall to 4.78 million.
- July: Sky are awarded the broadcast rights for 2014 Winter Olympics, but transfers the rights for the 2016 Summer Olympics to RAI.
- 9 August: Fox Sports launches on Sky and Mediaset Premium, broadcasting the Premier League, the FA Cup, La Liga and Ligue 1.
- September: Sky TG24 launches in high-definition, bringing the total number of HD channels to 63.
- October: Classica and MTV launch in high-definition, bringing the total number of HD channels to 65.
- November: Sky's subscribers fall to 4.76 million.
- December: Sky Go launches on Windows Phone.

=== 2014 ===
- February: Sky are awarded the broadcast rights for Italia's Got Talent and the UEFA Europa League for 3 seasons.
- 10 March: Sky Sport MotoGP launches.
- 9 April: Sky Atlantic launches, broadcasting American, Italian and European TV series.

=== 2015 ===
- August: Sky are awarded the broadcast rights for the Lega Basket Serie A for 2 seasons.
- December: Sky are awarded the broadcast rights for the Premier League for the 2016–17, 2017–18 and 2018–19 seasons.

=== 2016 ===
- May: Sky are awarded the broadcast rights for the EuroBasket 2017, EuroBasket Women 2017, 2018 FIBA Women's Basketball World Cup, 2019 FIBA Basketball World Cup, EuroBasket Women 2019, EuroBasket 2021, AfroBasket 2021, AmeriBasket 2021, 2021 FIBA Asia Cup and EuroBasket Women 2021.
- October:
  - Sky are awarded the broadcast rights for the NBA for the 2016–17 and 2017–18 seasons.
  - Sky's subscribers rise to 4.67 million.
- November: Cartoon Network HD is launched, bringing the number of HD channels to 66.

=== 2017 ===
- June:
  - Sky is awarded the broadcast rights for the 2017 FIFA Confederations Cup.
  - Sky is awarded the broadcast rights for the UEFA Champions League and UEFA Europa League for the 2018/19, 2019/20 and 2020/21 seasons, and for the 2018, 2019 and 2020 UEFA Super Cup.
- November: Sky launches Sky Q Platinum.

=== 2018 ===
- April: Mediaset Premium's cinema channels start broadcasting on Sky.
- June: Mediaset Premium's TV series channels start broadcasting on Sky.
- July: Channel logos became identical to the Sky UK ones. Sky launches Sky Q Black.
- December: Sky's subscribers reach 5,2 million.

=== 2019 ===
- February: Discovery Travel & Living and Animal Planet close.
- July: Mediaset Premium's TV series channel Premium Joi closes.
- September: Sky launches Sky Q Fiber.
- October: Disney XD, Disney in English, Fox Animation, Fox Comedy and Nat Geo People close.

=== 2020 ===
- May: Bike Channel, Disney Channel, Disney Junior, Teennick, MTV Rocks and MTV Hits close.
- July: Fox Life, Lei, Dove TV and Man-ga close.
- September:
  - Due to the COVID-19 pandemic, Sky's subscribers fall to 4.6 million.
  - The logos became identical to the Sky UK ones.
- December: GINX Esports TV close.

=== 2021 ===
- July: Fox Crime and Roma TV close, and Sky Documentaries, Sky Investigation, Sky Nature and Sky Serie are launched.

=== 2022 ===
- January: Premium Action, Premium Stories, Premium Crime, Premium Cinema, Paramount Network and Spike close.
- April: End of the digital terrestrial offer.
- July: Fox closed.
- October: National Geographic, National Geographic Wild, and Baby TV close and Lazio Style Channel is upgraded to HD.

=== 2023 ===
- August: Blaze closed.
- August: Sky Italia acquired the national broadcast rights to Serie C for the 2023–24 and 2024–25 seasons, with matches shown on Sky channels and streamed thorugh NOW.
- November: Crime & Investigation rebranded as Sky Crime.

=== 2024 ===
- April: Eurosport 4K, 3, 4, 5, 6, 7, 8 and 9 launch on the occasion of the Roland Garros and Paris 2024.
- December: Garante fine for telemarketing activities and GDPR violations

=== 2025 ===
- February: Classica rebranded Sky Classica.
- July: Removal of the Warner Bros. Discovery channels from the platform except for Cartoon Network and Boomerang. The two Eurosport channels were replaced by Sky Sport Mix and Sky Sport Legend and Discovery Channel was replaced by Sky Adventure.
- November: Sky Collection was launched.
- December: Disney Jr. was relaunched, Sky Cinema Due rebranded Sky Cinema Stories and MTV Music closed.

=== 2026 ===
- November: Sky Voices was launched.

== Sky HD and 4K HDR ==
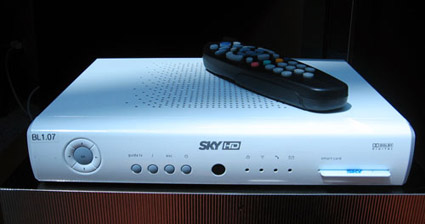
Sky Box HD (Pace)

Sky HD is the brand name of the HDTV service launched by Sky Italia on 20 April 2006 in Italy – during the 2006 FIFA World Cup – to enable high definition channels on Sky Italia to be viewed. The service requires the user to have a Sky Box HD (distributed by Sky Italia), and an HDTV with HDCP enabled.

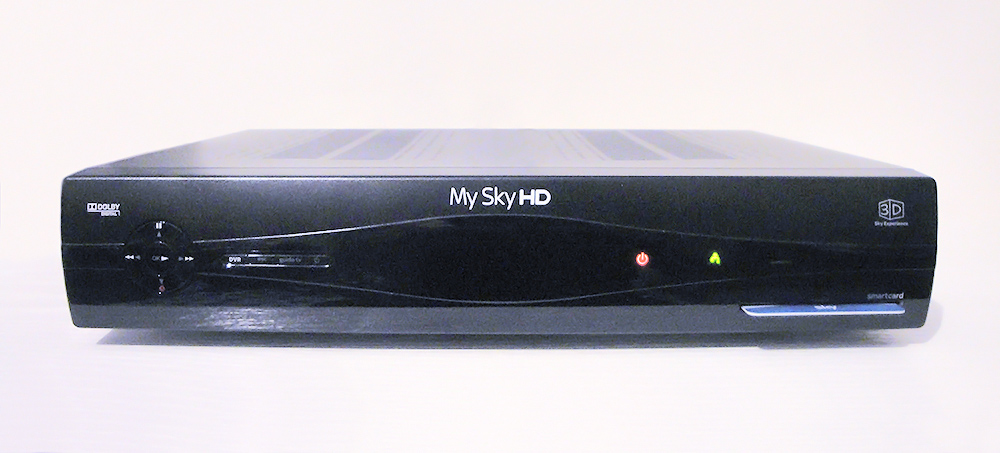
My Sky HD (Amstrad)

A HD PVR decoder called My Sky HD was launched on 26 May 2008 (on 20 December 2008 was sold a particular edition designed by Fendi in favour of the international organisation Child Priority).

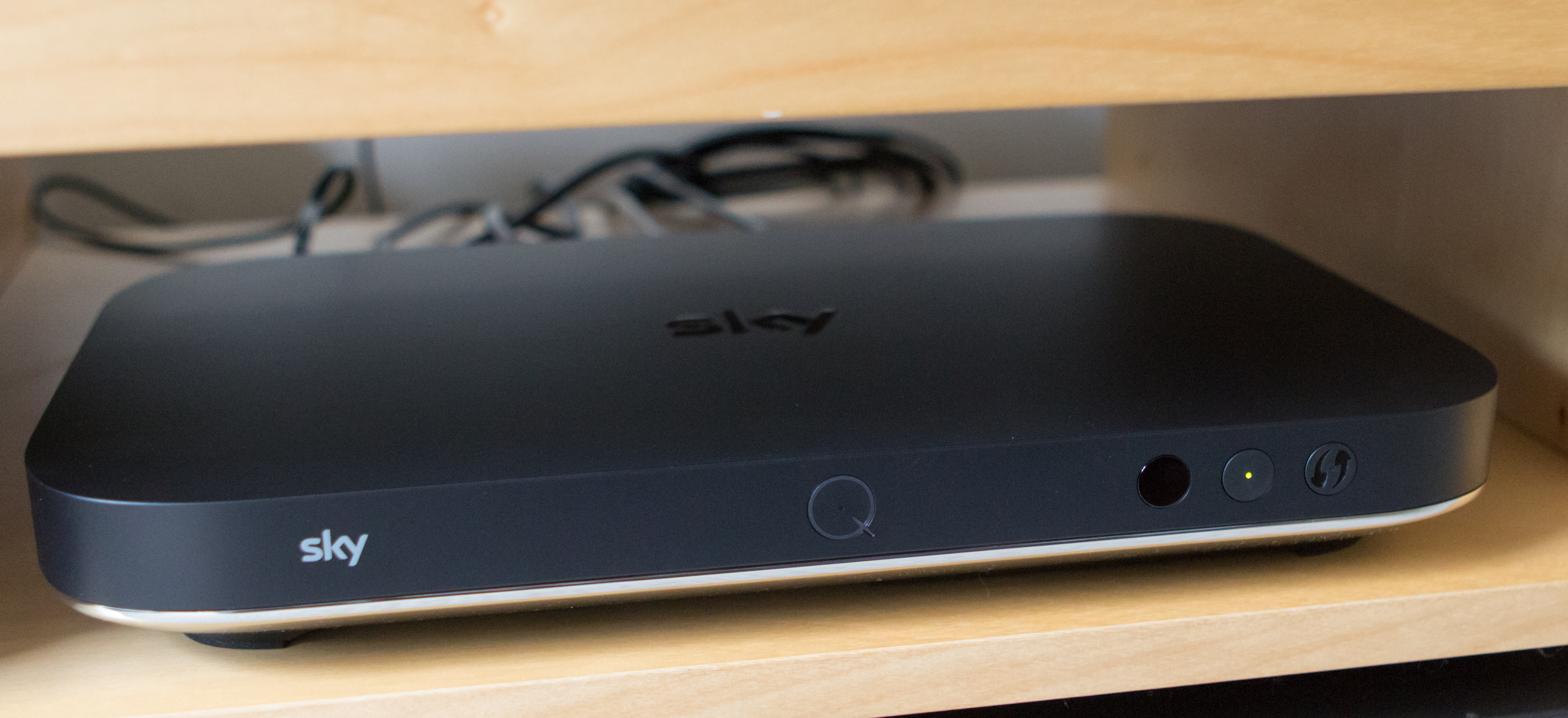
Sky Q Platinum

On 29 November 2017, Sky launched Sky Q Platinum, a set-top box enabled to view programmes in 4K HDR and to use the multiscreen wireless service.

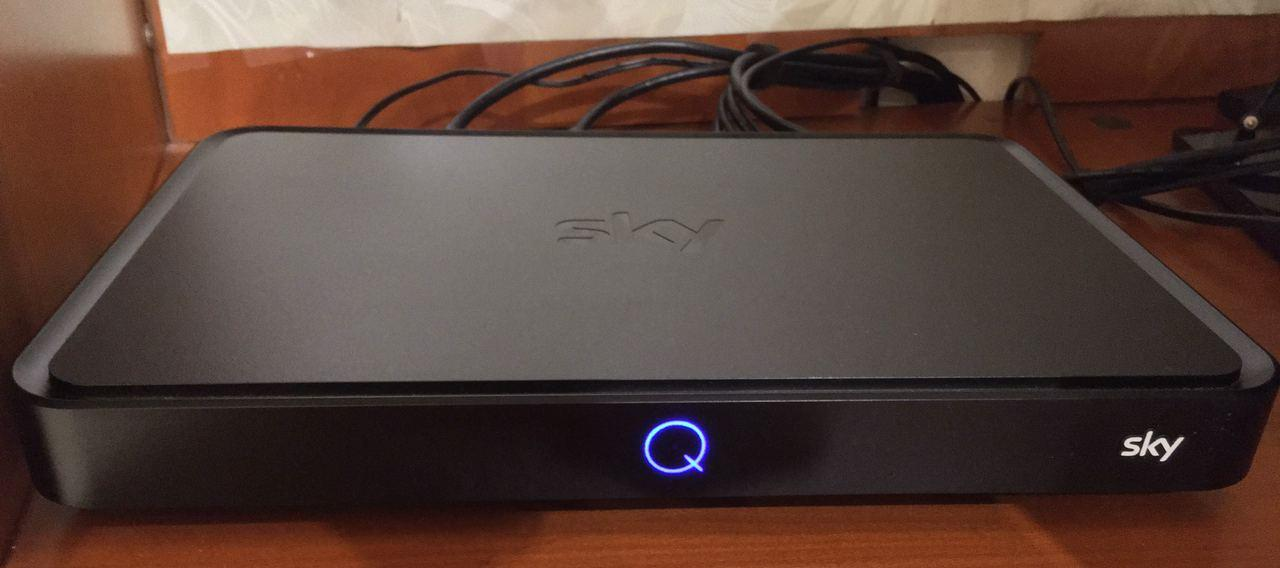
Sky Q Black

On 2 July 2018, Sky launched Sky Q Black, a set-top box identical to the Sky Q Platinum, which enables the 4K HDR service but not the multiscreen wireless.

Here are the channels available in HD:

TV	30 channels	Sky TG24 HD, Rete 4 HD, Canale 5 HD, Italia 1 HD, Sky Uno HD, Sky Uno + HD, Sky Serie HD, Sky Atlantic HD, Sky Collection HD, Sky Investigation HD, Sky Crime HD, Sky Arte HD, TV8 HD, NOVE HD, MTV HD, Sky Classica, 20 Mediaset HD, Discovery HD, Cielo HD, 27 Twentyseven HD, Real Time HD, Horse TV HD, Gambero Rosso Channel HD, Food Network HD, HGTV HD, Sky Adventure HD, Sky Nature HD, Sky Documentaries HD, History HD, Sky Voices HD
Cinema	9 channels	Sky Cinema Uno HD, Sky Cinema Stories HD, Sky Cinema Collection HD, Sky Cinema Family HD, Sky Cinema Action HD, Sky Cinema Suspense HD, Sky Cinema Romance HD, Sky Cinema Drama HD, Sky Cinema Comedy HD
Sport	11 channels	Sky Sport 24 HD, Sky Sport Uno HD, Sky Sport Arena HD, Sky Sport Max HD, Sky Sport Tennis HD, Sky Sport Basket HD, Sky Sport F1 HD, Sky Sport MotoGP HD, Sky Sport Legend HD, Sky Sport Mix HD, Sky Sport HD (channels from 251 to 257 depending on which event)
Calcio	11 channels	Sky Sport 24 HD, Sky Sport Calcio, Sky Sport HD (channels from 251 to 257 depending on which event)
Kids	2 channels	Cartoon Network HD, Disney Jr.
Primafila	7 channels	Sky Primafila 1 HD, Sky Primafila 2 HD, Sky Primafila 4 HD, Sky Primafila 6 HD, Sky Primafila 8 HD, Sky Primafila 10 HD, Sky Primafila 12 HD
Optional Channels	4 channels	DAZN 1, DAZN 2, DAZN 3, Milan TV, Inter TV
Business	4 channels	Sky Sport Business 1, Sky Sport Business 2, Sky Sport Business 3, Prime Video Sportsbar

== Logos ==
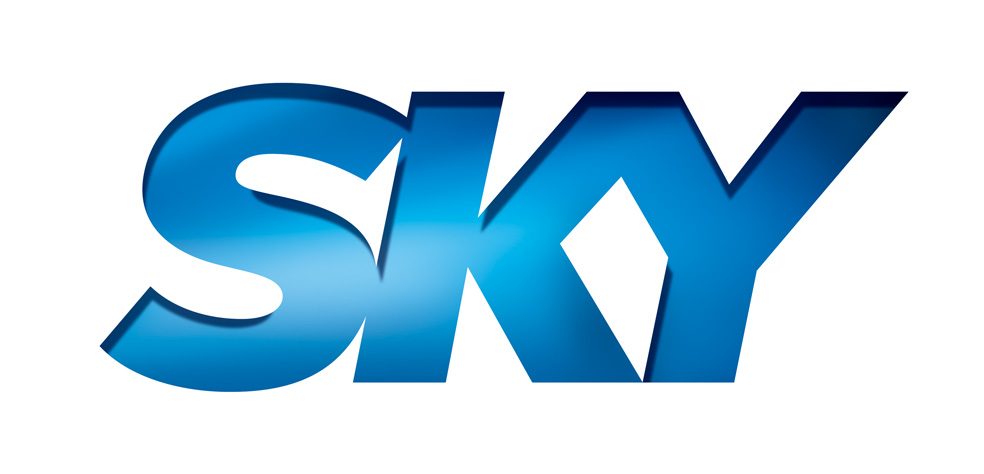
31 July 2003 – 3 September 2005	4 September 2005 – 27 June 2010	28 June 2010 – 25 September 2013	28 March 2015 – 1 July 2018	2 July 2018 – 13 September 2020	14 September 2020 – 7 January 2026	in use from 7 January 2026

== Channel Packs ==
Sky Italia offers a range of channels that are grouped into:

- Sky TV – Entertainment, TV series, news, documentaries and music;
- Entertainment plus – Adds Netflix to the Sky TV package;
- Sky Cinema – Sky's, and some other companies', film channels;
- Sky Sport and Sky Calcio (Football) – Sports and football channels;
- Sky Kids – Programmes for Children, most notably Cartoons.
- Sky Business - Adds Sky Sport's business channels for exclusive view of 7 Serie A matches every matchweek for public venues and Prime video Sportsbar in some offers to view the exclusive Wednesday night Champions League match. It can also include the Sky Sport and Sky Calcio (Football) channels.

=== Sky TV ===
- Rai 1
- Rai 2
- Rai 3
- Rete 4
- Canale 5
- Italia 1
- La7
- Sky Uno (Sky One, Sky Uno + available)
- Sky Serie
- Sky Atlantic
- Sky Crime
- Sky Arte (Sky Arts)
- TV8
- NOVE
- Comedy Central
- MTV
- Sky Classica
- Discovery
- 20 Mediaset
- Rai 4
- Rai 5
- Cielo
- 27 Twentyseven
- La5
- Real Time
- Mediaset Extra
- TOPcrime
- Giallo
- Sky Investigation
- Mediaset Italia 2
- DMAX
- Horse TV
- Gambero Rosso Channel
- Rai News 24
- Sky TG24 (Sky News Italy)
- Sky TG24 Primo Piano
- Sky Meteo 24 (Sky Weather 24)
- Sky News
- Mediaset TGCom24
- History
- Sky Documentaries
- Sky Nature
- Focus
- Food Network
- Discovery Turbo
- HGTV
- Sky Adventure
- Sky Collection
- Rai Storia
- Italiana
- Sky Voices

=== Sky Kids ===
- DeA Kids
- Rai Gulp
- Nick Jr.
- Nickelodeon
- Super!
- Disney Jr.
- Cartoon Network (+1 closed)
- Boomerang (+1 closed)
- DeA Junior

=== Sky Sport and Sky Calcio ===
- Sky Sport 24 (Sky Sports News)
- Sky Sport Uno (Sky Sports Main Event)
- Sky Sport Calcio (Sky Sports Football)
- Sky Sport Arena
- Sky Sport Max
- Sky Sport Tennis (Sky Sports Tennis)
- Sky Sport Basket
- Sky Sport F1 (Sky Sports Formula 1)
- Sky Sport MotoGP
- Sky Sport Legend
- Sky Sport Mix
- Sky Sport 4K
- Sky Sport (channels from 251 to 259)
- Rai Sport

=== Sky Cinema ===
- Sky Cinema Uno
- Sky Cinema Stories
- Sky Cinema Collection
- Sky Cinema Family
- Sky Cinema Action
- Sky Cinema Suspense
- Sky Cinema Romance
- Sky Cinema Drama
- Sky Cinema Comedy
- Iris
- Cine34
- La7 Cinema

=== Sky Business ===
- Sky Sport Business (channels from 215 to 217)
- Sky Sport 24 (Sky Sports News)

It can also include:

- Sky Sport Uno (Sky Sports Main Event)
- Sky Sport Calcio (Sky Sports Football)
- Sky Sport Arena
- Sky Sport Max
- Sky Sport Tennis (Sky Sports Tennis)
- Sky Sport Basket
- Sky Sport F1 (Sky Sports Formula 1)
- Sky Sport MotoGP
- Sky Sport Legend
- Sky Sport Mix
- Sky Sport 4K
- Sky Sport (channels from 251 to 259)
- Prime Video Sportsbar

=== Optional Channels ===
- DAZN (channels from 214 to 216)
- Milan TV
- Inter TV
- Caccia e Pesca
