= Sky Go =

British online television service

- Original author: Sky UK Limited
- Developer: Sky UK Limited
- Initial release: 11 January 2006 (as Sky by Broadband)
- Operating system: Windows; macOS; PlayStation 3 (Stopped working as of Mid-January 2021, named TV from Sky); PlayStation 4; PlayStation 5; Xbox Series X and Series S; Xbox One; Apple TV; iOS; Android
- Type: Television
- Website: www.sky.com/watch/sky-go/

Sky Go (formerly known as Sky Player, TV from Sky, Sky Anytime on PC and Sky By Broadband) is a streaming television service from Sky Group provided free for Sky TV subscribers in the United Kingdom and Ireland. It complements Sky TV by allowing subscribers to watch live and on demand Sky TV via an internet connection on the go. The Sky Go app is available on Windows and Mac computers and also on Android and iOS devices.

== Overview ==
On demand content comprises sports highlights, latest news, movies and TV programmes. Content is viewable for a limited amount of time and is protected by digital rights management software provided by Microsoft and the NDS Group, and therefore cannot be copied to disc or viewed beyond the date carried by its licence. The service is available at no extra cost to existing Sky TV customers, with accessible content depending on the subscriber's Sky package. Non-Sky TV customers can access the service by subscribing on a pay-per-view basis.

Sky Go is viewable on up to two devices, with the ability to increase this to four devices with Sky Go Extra for a monthly fee. The now-deprecated Microsoft Silverlight 3.0 browser plug-in is required to play content on computers. Due to viewing rights, certain programmes are not available to watch via Sky Go, and are 'blacked out' from the schedule. To have access to the full selection of live TV channels available on Sky Go, users will need a subscription to the relevant Sky TV packages that correspond to the available channels.

== History ==
Sky Player on Windows Media Center (2010)

It originally launched on 11 January 2006 as Sky by Broadband. On 25 November 2006 Sky announced that Sky By Broadband had been rebranded as Sky Anytime on PC. The rebranding also coincided with an update to the client, which included a new interface and a pay-per-view service for movies and US television shows. On 16 May 2008, Sky Anytime on PC was rebranded as Sky Player, along with updated software to include live simulcasts of Sky News and Sky Sports.

On 29 October 2009, the Sky Player service expanded on to the Xbox 360. An Xbox Live Gold subscription is required, and users need to register via the Sky Go website. Features include a party system which allows multiple users to watch content at the same time, with users represented by their Xbox 360 Avatars in a virtual room. Due to the high level of demand, the launch of the service was troublesome and technical issues caused the entire Sky Go platform to become unavailable. To rectify this, Sky decided to open up Sky Go on Xbox 360 to users incrementally over the following days. On 19 November 2009, Sky Player was also made available to Windows Media Center-equipped Windows 7 computers.

Users of 3G phones on Vodafone, Orange, and T-Mobile could subscribe to a service called Sky Mobile TV. The service consisted of three packages —-Sky News, Sport and Factual Pack; Sky Entertainment Pack; and Sky Music Pack—-which include a mixture of live and made-for-mobile channels of broadcasters’ channels. Originally Sky Mobile TV launched for 3G Vodafone live! customers in November 2005. The first live football match from Sky Sports was streamed to mobile at the start of the 2007-08 season.

On 6 July 2011, Sky Player and Sky Mobile TV services were merged and rebranded as Sky Go. Key changes include the ability to watch live channels in line with your Sky TV subscription at no additional cost, limited to two simultaneous devices. Support for Windows Media Center was dropped, however an app was released for Apple's iOS operating system, used on the iPad, iPhone and iPod Touch. A Sky Go app for Android devices was released on 20 February 2012. Sky Go for Android does not work on rooted phones and was initially only available on a selection of Android phones from HTC and Samsung. On 11 December 2012, Sky Go added support for Jelly Bean and additional devices, including those from Google, LG and Sony.

As of 2013, Sky Go is not in development for other platforms such as BlackBerry 10, Windows Phone 8 or Windows RT, as Sky believes that the market is too small to justify the cost of development.

On 22 January 2013, a download service called Sky Go Extra was added, allowing up to four users to download content to their computers, smartphones and tablets to view offline for an additional monthly fee. The download feature was previously available for free in the Sky Go Desktop client.

On 1 May 2014, Sky announced the PlayStation 3 and PlayStation 4 will be receiving Sky Go by the end of 2014. The PlayStation 4 received the service on 3 December 2014, through an application named "TV from Sky" and on 29 January 2015 Sky launched this application on the PlayStation 3.

Since 2019, Sky Mobile customers can use Sky Go including Sky Cinema and Sky Sports without a mobile data charge.

== International versions ==
Previous Sky Go logo for Germany

Separate Sky Go services are also operated by Sky Italia and Sky Deutschland.
