= Timeshift channel =

Time-delayed rebroadcast of a TV channel

A timeshift channel or time-shift channel (sometimes referred to as a +1 channel) is a television channel carrying time-delayed reruns of its "parent" channel's programming. This channel runs alongside its parent: the term timeshift does not refer to a network broadcasting at a later time to reflect a local time zone, unless the parent is also available. Often the timeshift channel's branding and advertising will be the same as that of the parent, with the channel number and respective timing being the only distinction between the two, but some, such as Channel 4 +1 in the United Kingdom and TVNZ 1+1 in New Zealand, will overlay a different digital on-screen graphic to distinguish the two channels. A few channels, like Film4 +1 in the United Kingdom, do not carry a digital on-screen graphic on its regular channel or its timeshift channel.

== Australia ==
In Australia, timeshifted Foxtel pay-TV channels typically carry a time delay of two hours, making the timeshift channels run on local time in Western Australia when daylight saving time is not in effect. These channels may accordingly be described as +2, such as on Arena, although the timeshift for W. is branded as W2. More than 20 timeshift channels exist, most of the entertainment channels. On 10 August 2026, Network 10 will launch 10+1, a free-to-air timeshift channel which broadcasts the main Channel 10 schedule with a one-hour delay.

== New Zealand ==
In New Zealand, Sky Movies 2 was formerly a two-hour delayed timeshift channel of Sky Movies 1 between 2007 and 2013. MediaWorks launched an hour-delayed timeshift channel of the TV3 feed with Auckland regional advertising on 30 March 2009. In 2012, TVNZ replaced TVNZ 7 with an hour-delayed timeshift channel of the TVNZ 1 feed with Auckland regional advertising. In late August 2013, U was also replaced, with an hour-delayed timeshifted version of TV2. Mediaworks launched an hour-delayed timeshifted version of Four on 27 June 2014 and replaced it with an hour-delayed timeshifted version of Bravo on 3 July 2016. Sky Network Television launched an hour-delayed timeshifted version of Prime on 1 February 2017.

On 1 July 2019, MediaWorks launched an hour-delayed timeshift version of ThreeLife, replacing The Edge TV which went online only.

== Europe ==
=== Bulgaria ===
In Bulgaria, the terrestrial versions of bTV Lady, Ring BG, and Diema Family are shifted by an hour, with the normal versions are only available on cable and satellite.

=== Ireland ===
Ireland has access to many of the UK's timeshift channels through satellite and cable services. Some are also available via spillover transmissions from Northern Ireland such as UTV's timeshift service UTV +1. RTÉ provides two timeshift service for RTÉ One and RTÉ Two, RTÉ One +1 and RTÉ Two +1 respectively. RTÉ One +1 used to be part-time, starting each night at 7 p.m. after the close of RTÉjr, though since the launch of RTÉ Two +1 in 2019, it became full-time, with RTÉjr now time sharing with RTÉ Two +1 since then. TV3 launched its timeshift service in April 2015, though is only available on satellite and cable. TG4 (the Irish language broadcaster) launched its timeshift channel TG4 +1 on 8 September 2023, coinciding with the launch of the Cúla4 channel, with which TG4 +1 timeshares with.

=== Italy ===
In Italy the main Timeshift channels provider is Sky and most of their channels have a time delay of one hour. In the past, some channels like Sky Uno, Fox and Fox Crime had two-hours delay channels but all of them were closed.

=== Poland ===
In Poland, there are two timeshift channels. Private, commercial TVN HD +1 was launched on May 1, 2010, and regional TVS HD +1 on April 30, 2010.

=== United Kingdom (UK) ===
In the United Kingdom, most timeshift channels have a time delay of one hour, and are thus described as a +1 channel – for instance, U&Gold has a timeshift channel known as U&Gold +1. Not all channels are named like this, for example the timeshift channel of U&Dave is named U&DaveJaVu, and the timeshift channel of High Street TV 1 is named High Street TV 3. +2 channels, with a delay of two hours, also used to exist. The most notable of these was Fox, formerly known as FX. However, there are currently no more +2 channels on air, with the last remaining +2 channel, TLC +2, being shut down on 27 April 2018. Most timeshift channels are available only via pay television, though a fair number also have availability through the digital terrestrial television Freeview platform, with some Freeview +1 networks limited in availability by a region's transmitter station reach (such as London/Crystal Palace or Manchester/Winter Hill). 50 timeshift channels are carried over Sky, whilst 31 are available through Virgin Media. National Geographic +1 is no longer available on Sky in the UK

== The Americas ==
=== United States ===
In the United States, timeshift channels typically carry a time delay of three hours (in line with the time difference between the east and west coasts of the U.S.); the main channel feed is generally identified as the "East" feed and is programmed for Eastern Time Zone viewers, while the corresponding timeshift channel is generally identified as the "West" feed and is programmed for viewers in the Pacific Time Zone. For conventional broadcast networks, a timeshift channel is a network affiliate from a market in another time zone (such as New York City-based stations WCBS-TV, WNBC, WABC-TV and WNYW as Eastern Time Zone feeds, and Los Angeles-based stations KCBS-TV, KNBC, KABC-TV and KTTV as Pacific Time Zone feeds for CBS, NBC, ABC and Fox, respectively); for cable-only outlets, a timeshift channel is simply the original programming feed retransmitted at a later time, as is the case with timeshift channels in other countries. (Many cable systems in the Mountain states transmit a mix of timeshift channels as the originating network feed, split by the network between the "East" and "West" feed as opposed to offering uniform feeds of each channel that is aligned to the feed intended for distribution in the corresponding locale.) CBS also uses its streaming news service CBS News as a timeshift channel, carrying select CBS News programs on a half-hour delay from their original airings.

The major U.S. terrestrial television networks broadcast without delay in the Eastern and Central time zones (UTC−5 and UTC−6, respectively), but delayed programs by one and three hours respectively for the Mountain (UTC−7) and Pacific (UTC−8) time zones. The start of U.S. evening prime time programs is typically announced in the form of "8, 7 Central" (often written as "8/7c") or "8 Eastern and Pacific" (often written as "8 ET/PT").

Many cable television channels do not timeshift (or offer timeshift feeds to all viewers across the country), though there are several exceptions. As an alternative, many cable channels, including cable news outlets such as Fox News Channel, CNN and HLN repeat most of their prime time programs on their main channel in late night time slots, so that they will air during prime time in both the Eastern and Pacific time zones, though it is subject to pre-emption because of later breaking news.

Premium channels such as HBO, Showtime and Starz commonly air three-hour delayed feeds of the main channel and their multiplex channels, though typically digital cable providers only simultaneously carry the East and West coast feeds of the main channel while the multiplex channels are a singular feed (the "East" feed for the Central and Eastern time zones, and the "West" feed for the Pacific and Mountain zones); this allows subscribers to watch a movie, series or special three hours behind or ahead of its original airing in their area (in the case of The Movie Channel, many cable systems only carry the respective coastal feed of the main channel and its multiplex channel The Movie Channel Xtra, rather than airing the East and West feeds of the primary channel or both channels).

Many children's television channels, such as Disney Channel, Nickelodeon, and Cartoon Network also have timeshift services; however, most digital cable providers will only provide the East or West coast feed in the basic package and the opposite feed, if available, is often in a higher package tier (satellite subscribers will often receive both the East and West feed as part of their service package). The Nick Jr. Channel notably only maintained a single Eastern Time feed until 2013, which led to controversy when the channel launched its adult-oriented NickMom programming block, which had started at 7:00 p.m. in the Pacific Time Zone and earlier in Alaska and Hawaii, at times when preschoolers would still be awake in those regions; Nick Jr. would later launch a West Coast feed due to complaints from some parents about the content featured on the NickMom block.

Sporting events, including the Super Bowl, have been broadcast live in all U.S. time zones simultaneous with the primetime schedule of the Eastern time zone, for decades, resulting in announcements such as "4 Eastern, 1 Pacific" (generally shown as "4 ET/1 PT"). In the event of a sporting event leading into prime time on the East Coast, the following programs are often said to be "coming up next, except on the West Coast," as additional programming is shifted around to fill the time between the end of the event and the start of prime time on the West Coast. Many times, this is the programming that was preempted by the effectively earlier time slot in the western zones. Live nationwide U.S. airings of international sporting events like the FIFA World Cup on Fox and the Olympic Games on NBC, beginning in the late 2010s, are simultaneous with the actual live global broadcast regardless of the hosting nation, resulting in adjustments by networks as most of their games may fall outside the primetime slots of any of the U.S. time zones at the time of the event (and, on occasion, televise live during daytime with primetime encores when the hosting nation is located outside the Americas).

Until the mid-2000s, several awards shows were routinely tape-delayed for viewers on the West Coast while being transmitted live east of the Rockies. However, by the late 2000s, with the rise of social media like Twitter and Facebook around discussion of television programming, many of them now choose to air their ceremonies live all across the mainland U.S., especially those held in the Los Angeles area where tape-delayed broadcasts had been conducted by the networks in the past. The transition was ushered in 2009 by NBC with the Golden Globe Awards, primarily aiming to prevent spoilers for western viewers previously relying on telecasts delayed until local prime time. In the past, the only way to find out winners in advance was through radio news and print wire reports summarizing the ceremonies in progress, before the Internet and social media and their more widely-reaching and immediate reports effectively made tape delay a pointless endeavor.

The Academy Awards regularly air live on ABC across mainland North America for decades before expanding to full live telecasts for all U.S. territories in 2019. Since 2016, CBS mandates all of its affiliates across all U.S. time zones in and out of mainland North America to air the Grammy Awards live simultaneously with the East Coast primetime airing with corresponding local primetime encores for each U.S. time zone outside the Eastern and Central time zones. The Primetime Emmy Awards, on rotation among ABC, CBS, Fox, and NBC, joined the Grammys in airing completely live all across the U.S., including Hawaii, starting with CBS' telecast turn in 2017 to resolve the complaints of tape-delaying live American TV shows outside the mainland continent. In its resumption with physical show staging since the beginning of the COVID-19 pandemic in 2022, the Tony Awards completed the shift of major U.S. entertainment awards shows to live coast-to-coast U.S. telecasts with its respective broadcast transition.

The Billboard Music Awards began its live coast-to-coast U.S. telecast with ABC in 2016 and has since juggled between West Coast-delayed and live coast-to-coast U.S. broadcasts in its transfer to NBC beginning in 2018. Meanwhile, the MTV Video Music Awards have regularly aired live all across U.S. territories simultaneously with The CW as part of its post-COVID-19 pandemic adjustments since 2020. In particular, network-timeshifting of live U.S. television broadcasts has since steadily declined amidst the rise of social media and online streaming services, simultaneous with the increasing trend of U.S. entertainment shows towards live coast-to-coast American broadcasting that earned renewed importance for they are "DVR-proof" in terms of ratings and social purposes.

Now more rarely, lesser ceremonies continue to air live in the Eastern and Central time zones while tape-delayed for all other U.S. territories, as their airtime is often purchased as a brokered programming arrangement, and as disruption for those ceremonies (often on weekdays) is much less tolerated by their airing network's affiliate base west of the Rockies. Other ceremonies that do not air live are taped in advance, including those broadcast on weekend nights in the U.S., to allow standards and practices to watch the ceremony in advance and determine cuts for profanity or content to insert a bleep censor or cut-away, and the producers can make cuts for time and superfluous items such as longer walks than expected by an award winner to the stage or a rare botched performance with the replacement of dress rehearsal footage.

=== Canada ===
In Canada, digital television services typically offer network stations from at least Toronto and Vancouver as timeshift channels, and may also offer stations from other markets as well. Most English-language programming is transmitted without delay in the Atlantic time zone (UTC−4) and delayed in most of the rest of the country. This results in the effective existence of, for example, +1, +2, +3, and +4 channels of the broadcast networks for viewers in the Atlantic time zone and −4, −3, −2, and −1 channels for Pacific viewers. French programming is transmitted without delay on Montreal's CBFT-DT in the Eastern zone and delayed only in Western Canada. In Newfoundland, CBNT-DT, which has its own time zone half an hour ahead of Atlantic time, programming airs at the same time as in the Atlantic, with special time announcements (thus, for instance, The National on CBC will be said to air at 10:00, 10:30 in Newfoundland).

In practice, only the CBC delays its entire prime time schedule for each time zone; the commercial networks typically schedule programs to maximize their ability to claim simultaneous substitution rights (which allows local broadcast stations to require U.S. broadcast stations' signals on television providers to be overridden with their own, if they are airing the exact same program in simulcast), resulting in programs often being scheduled in pattern with an airing from the Eastern or Pacific zones. In Alberta, programs may sometimes be aired earlier or later than normal than in other parts of the country in order to achieve a simsub with either coast, as stations from Spokane (which is located in Pacific time, one hour behind local Mountain time) are typically carried on cable in the province. An exception are network affiliates in Saskatchewan; although most of the province (aside from Lloydminster, which follows Alberta time year-round) observes Central time, it does not observe daylight saving time. While local time in the province matches Mountain time during the spring and summer months, local stations continue to schedule their programs in pattern with their sister stations in Manitoba.

Several Canadian cable channels have separate feeds for the Eastern and Pacific time zones, such as YTV, Teletoon, Family, History, UNIS, CTV Comedy Channel, and W Network, though sometimes their high definition feeds are only available in eastern feeds. Crave operates its west coast feeds on Mountain time instead of Pacific time, a holdover from the former Alberta-based service Movie Central.

=== Latin America ===
In Latin America, Spanish-language pay television programming used to be broadcast without delay in Argentina and Uruguay, and delayed in most countries; this situation was common in networks that broadcast one video feed for distribution to the rest of Latin American countries, as it centred their schedule using the Argentine time zone (HBO, Moviecity). However, this stopped being the case on basic-tier subscription TV with the launch of different regional feeds centred on local time zones, either based on Mexico, Colombia, Peru or Chile. Networks that are known to employ this practice are Star Channel, MTV, ESPN, Cartoon Network, Nickelodeon, among others. In cases of live programming, all events are broadcast in all feeds live without delay.

Portuguese-language programming in Brazil is transmitted in broadcast and cable networks without delay throughout the country in all time zones, except for broadcast stations in Acre, which is the only state 2 hours behind Brasília time.

A 2007 Ministry of Justice ordinance require broadcasters to respect local time zones in their scheduling of age-limited content, which is sustained in a 2014 ordinance. This includes the Daylight savings time, which is only observed in some states. Fuso networks (Note: The "Fuso Network" originally referred to Rede Globo's system, but it has also come to refer to similar systems by other broadcasters.) were created on 2008 that timeshifted programs to different regions. This created difficulties with live programs for viewers and additional expenses for the broadcasters. The difficulties led to time zone reforms that gradually reduced the number and the time gap of time zones in Brazil, sometimes with controversy due to disruptions they could cause to daily schedules. For example, a 2008 bill that would have unified Brazil's time zones was made at request of a television network owner, but it was withdrawn after criticisms citing a lack of public cosultation. The 2010 Acre time zone referendum that brought the state's original time zones were also opposed by broadcasters, taking until 2013 to be approved. The broadcasters have fought in court since 2011 to remove the penalties for not following age restriction schedule. The Supreme Federal Court ruled in 2016 that the rule was an illegal form of censorship. Therefore, there is no longer a legal obligation for a concrete time-based limit on age-restricted content broadcasting. In 2017, Globo closed its Fuso Network, thus removing delays on its programs, and Amazon Network Acre reduced the delay to 1 hour.

XEW-TV (the flagship of Canal de las Estrellas) in Mexico has two timeshift feeds: Canal de las Estrellas −1 and Canal de las Estrellas −2, delayed one and two hours respectively from the main Mexico City feed. These timeshift feeds are broadcast on terrestrial television in the Mountain and Pacific time zones and are available on pay television in various parts of the country.

== See also ==
- Time shifting
- Effects of time zones on North American broadcasting
- Place shifting (also known as "space shifting")
