= Fox (Italian TV channel) =

Italian TV channel

- Country: Italy
- Broadcast area: Italy
- Headquarters: Rome, Italy

Programming
- Languages: Italian and English
- Picture format: 1080i (HDTV)
- Timeshift service: Fox +1 & Fox +2

Ownership
- Owner: Fox Networks Group Italy (Disney Media and Entertainment Distribution/Disney Italia)

History
- Launched: 31 July 2003
- Replaced: Next:HD (HD)
- Closed: 1 July 2022 (18 years, 11 months and 1 day)

Links
- Website: www.foxtv.it

Availability

Terrestrial
- Sky Italia: LCN 457 (SD)

Fox was an Italian television channel, owned by Fox Networks Group Italy and broadcast in Italy by Sky Italia on Channel 112. Launched on 31 July 2003, coinciding with the launch of Sky Italy, it broadcast its programs in Italian and English. In 2009, it started broadcasting in HD.

On 20 March 2019, Disney acquired Fox Network Group's owner, 21st Century Fox. The channel ceased broadcasting on 1 July 2022, with Nat Geo/Wild and Baby TV remaining on air, until these channels closed on 1 October 2022, ending Disney Italia's distribution of networks through cable and satellite. Most of the channel's programming moved to Disney+'s Star hub.

The Simpsons is the last program of Fox before the channel is shut down permanently.
