= Maurizio Lombardi =

Italian actor (born 1973)

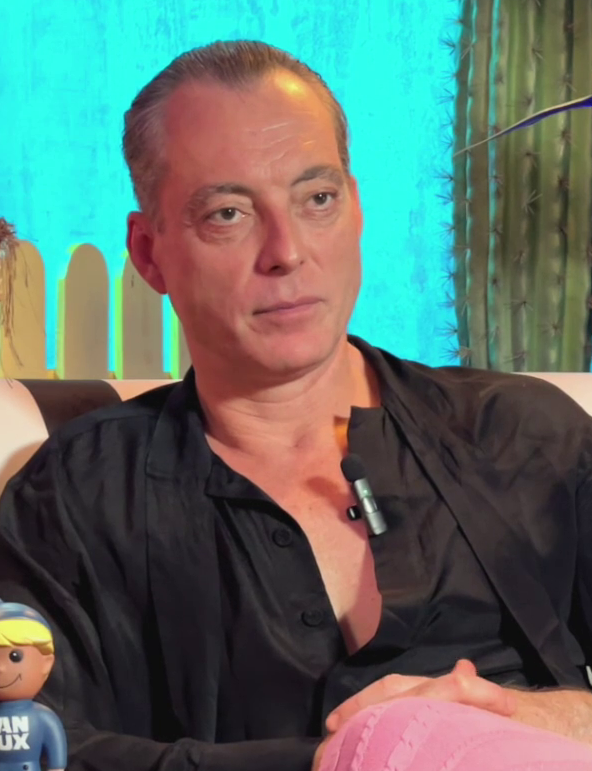
- Lombardi in 2024
- Born: 17 November 1973 (age 52); Florence, Italy
- Occupation: Actor

Maurizio Lombardi (born 17 November 1973) is an Italian actor, playwright and stage director.

== Life and career ==
Lombardi started his career in the stage company of Ugo Chiti, where he stayed ten years. He later formed the “Piccoli Briganti” stage company together with Nicola Magnini, specializing in comedy plays retelling old fables and children's novels such as Peter Pan and Snow White.

Lombardi made his playwriting debut with Stile Libero and in 2013 won the Florence Fringe Festival with the drama Fists of Sulfur ("Pugni di Zolfo"), which was later staged at the Edinburgh Festival Fringe. In the mid-2010s he had his breakout with the theatrical hit The Pride, directed by Luca Zingaretti, which got him a Le Maschere Award nomination, and later with the role of Cardinal Mario Assente in Paolo Sorrentino's series The Young Pope. In 2024, he won a Nastro d'Argento for best actor in a comedy film for Romeo Is Juliet.

== Filmography ==
=== Film ===
Year	Title	Role	Notes
2000	Up at the Villa	English Lord	
2010	L'occasione	Alberto	Short film
2011	Some Say No	Teacher	
2011	10 ragazze	Camillo	
2011	The First on the List	Officer Palazzi	
2013	La terra e il vento	Erasmo	
2013	Cha cha cha	Dancer	Uncredited
2015	I calcianti	Veleno	
2016	L'Universale	Egisto Tamburini	
2017	Chi m'ha visto	Don Julio	
2017	Metti una notte	Renato	
2017	All the Money in the World	Mammoliti's Doctor	
2018	Soledad	Parodi	
2018	The Invisible Boy: Second Generation	Commissioner	Cameo appearance
2018	Put Grandma in the Freezer	Marshal Rambaudo	
2018	Non è vero ma ci credo	Michel De Best	
2019	Tutta un'altra vita	Manuel	
2019	The Nest	Dr. Christian	
2019	The Bears' Famous Invasion of Sicily	De Ambrosiis	Voice role
2019	Pinocchio	Tuna	
2020	Tigers	Galli	
2021	School of Mafia	Salvo Svizzero	
2021	On Our Watch	De Spuches	
2022	Tapirulàn	Fabio	
2022	Princess	The Rich Client	
2022	Robbing Mussolini	Camillo Serbelloni	
2022	Across the River and into the Trees	Guido	
2022	Amusia	Ferdinando Bonazza	
2023	Mi fanno male i capelli	Ugo	
2023	Vangelo secondo Maria	Herod the Great	
2024	Romeo Is Juliet	Lorenzo	
2024	Casi el Paraíso	Francesco De Antis	
2024	Beautiful Rebel	Danilo Nannini	
2025	40 Seconds	Chef Tocai	
2026	At the Revolutionary Festival	Gabriele D'Annunzio	
2026	Roma Elastica	Andrea	
2026	God Laughs	Friar Monaldo	

=== Television ===
Year	Title	Role	Notes
2008	Don Matteo	Danilo Quaresima	Episode: "La stanza di un angelo"
2010	Romanzo criminale – La serie	Canna	Episode: "Episodio 6"
2013, 2015	Murders at Barlume	Rocco / Mago Atlante	2 episodes
2014	Mario	Steve Mozzafiato	Main role (season 2)
2014	Il candidato	Alessandro Lana	Episode: "Discorso emozionante"
2015	L'Oriana	Il Moro	Two-parts television movie
2015	1992	Paolo Pellegrini	Recurring role; 6 episodes
2016	Thou Shalt Not Kill	Sergio Avigliano	Episode: "Episode 12"
2016	Dov'è Mario?	Fulvio	2 episodes
2016	The Young Pope	Cardinal Mario Assente	Recurring role; 5 episodes
2017	1993	Paolo Pellegrini	2 episodes
2018	Medici	Andrea Foscari	Recurring role; 3 episodes
2019	The Name of the Rose	Berengar of Arundel	Main role
2019	1994	Paolo Pellegrini	Recurring role; 3 episodes
2020	The New Pope	Cardinal Mario Assente	Main role
2020	Riviera	Luca Aliperti	Episode: "La Dolce Vita"
2022	Non mi lasciare	Ernesto Fortin	Main role
2022	L'Ora – Inchiostro contro piombo	Marcello Grisanti	Main role
2022–2023	Monterossi	Il Socio	Main role
2024	Ripley	Inspector Piero Ravini	Main role
2024	Citadel: Diana	Ettore Zani	Main role
2025	Mussolini: Son of the Century	Emilio De Bono	Main role
2026	Blade Runner 2099 †	TBA	Upcoming series
