= Gaetano Bruno =

Italian actor (born 1973)

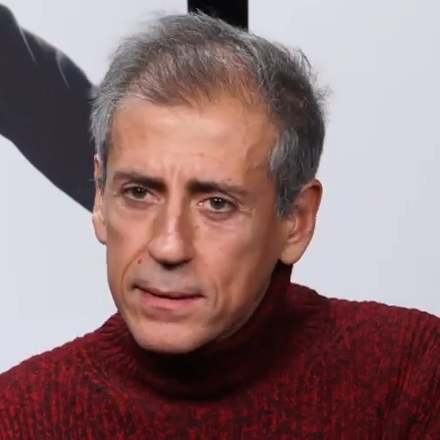
- Bruno in 2025
- Born: 26 July 1973 (age 53); Palermo, Italy
- Education: Scuola del Biondo
- Occupation: Actor
- Years active: 2000–present
- Website: gaetanobruno.com

Gaetano Bruno (Italian pronunciation: [ɡaeˈtaːno ˈbruːno]; born 26 July 1973) is an Italian actor.

== Biography ==
Bruno was born in Palermo. He studied economics at university, but never graduated. He later attended the Scuola del Biondo drama school at the Teatro Biondo.

He has a daughter with actress Elena Radonicich.

== Filmography ==
=== Film ===
Year	Title	Role	Ref.
2004	The Consequences of Love	Nicolò	
2007	The Sweet and the Bitter	Mimmo	
2007	Miss F	Peppino	
2009	Baaria	Gino Artale	
2009	The White Space	Giovanni Berti	
2009	The Double Hour	Riccardo	
2010	Gorbaciof	The Arab	
2010	Angel of Evil	Fausto	
2012	The Lithium Conspiracy	Kerr	
2016	Indivisible	Marco Ferrari	
2017	Moglie e marito	Cristian	
2017	It's the Law	Marshal	
2018	The Stolen Caravaggio	Diego Spadafora	
2019	Martin Eden	Judge Mattei	
2021	House of Gucci	Franco	
2023	Mission: Impossible – Dead Reckoning Part One	Magistrate	
2024	Il giudice e il boss	Cesare Terranova	
2024	Ho visto un re	Federale Trocca	
2025	Afrodite	Rocco	
2025	Make a Wish	Vinicio	
TBA	Il cileno		
TBA	Lo scambio		

=== Television ===
Year	Title	Role	Notes	Ref.
2007	Men of Corleone	Placido Rizzotto	Television film	
2010	Squadra antimafia – Palermo oggi	Michele Liguori	3 episodes	
2012	A fari spenti nella notte	Leonardo Parenti	Television film	
2012	Never for Love	Rizzato	1 episode	
2014	L'oro di Scampia	Nicola	Television film	
2014	Le due leggi	Giacomo Pratelli	Television film	
2015	1992	Luigi Brancato	2 episodes	
2016	Luisa Spagnoli: Queen of Chocolate	Arnaud	Television film	
2016	Il sistema	Salvo Diamanti	1 episode	
2016	The Mafia Kills Only in Summer	Antonio Ayala	12 episodes	
2016	Lampedusa	Valente	2 episodes	
2017–2023	The Red Door	Diego Paoletto	16 episodes	
2017	Thou Shalt Not Kill	Father Alessandro	1 episode	
2017	1993	Luigi Brancato	6 episodes	
2019	1994	Luigi Brancato		
2019	Made in Italy	Walter Albini	3 episodes	
2020–2021	Cacciatore: The Hunter	Pietro Aglieri	7 episodes	
2020	Fargo	Constant Calamita	8 episodes	
2022	Doc – Nelle tue mani	Edoardo Valenti	16 episodes	
2022	The Net	Maurizio Corridori	6 episodes	
2023	Noi siamo leggenda	Giuseppe Liberati	1 episode	
2025	Mussolini: Son of the Century	Giacomo Matteotti	8 episodes	
2025	The Leopard	Governor Leonforte	4 episodes	
