= 1993 (TV series) =

Italian television series

- Genre: Political drama; Political thriller
- Created by: Alessandro Fabbri; Ludovica Rampoldi; Stefano Sardo
- Based on: an original idea by Stefano Accorsi
- Written by: Alessandro Fabbri; Ludovica Rampoldi; Stefano Sardo
- Directed by: Giuseppe Gagliardi
- Starring: Stefano Accorsi; Guido Caprino; Miriam Leone; Domenico Diele; Tea Falco; Antonio Gerardi
- Composer: Davide Dileo
- Country of origin: Italy
- Original language: Italian
- No. of episodes: 8

Production
- Executive producers: Lorenzo Mieli; Mario Gianani; Nils Hartmann; Roberto Amoroso; Sonia Rovai; Guido De Laurentiis
- Production locations: Rome; Milan
- Cinematography: Michele Paradisi
- Editor: Francesca Calvelli
- Camera setup: Single-camera
- Running time: 50 minutes
- Production companies: Wildside; BETA

Original release
- Network: Sky Atlantic
- Release: 16 May – 6 June 2017

Related
- 1992; 1994

1993 is an Italian political drama television series created by Alessandro Fabbri, Ludovica Rampoldi, Stefano Sardo for Sky Atlantic, and based on an idea by Stefano Accorsi. A sequel to the 2015 series 1992, it premiered on 16 May 2017 on pay-tv Sky Italia channels Sky Atlantic and Sky Cinema 1.

1993 is set in Rome and Milan. The TV series follows the stories of six people whose lives are intertwined with the rapidly changing political landscape in the early 1990s, during which Italy was gripped by the Mani pulite investigation into political corruption. Subsequently, this led to the end of the "First Republic". It is followed by 1994.

The series stars Stefano Accorsi, Guido Caprino, Miriam Leone, Domenico Diele, Tea Falco, Antonio Gerardi. Laura Chiatti is introduced in the recurring cast as Arianna Rosato, the new partner of Leonardo Notte.

== Plot ==
The series continues with the story of the characters started in 1992, having in background the main Italian events of 1993: the ENIMONT trial, the political fall of Bettino Craxi and PSI, the mafia attacks of Florence, Rome and Milan, the end of the First Republic and the rise of Silvio Berlusconi.

== Cast and characters ==
=== Main ===
- Stefano Accorsi as Leonardo Notte. Having become very faithful to Silvio Berlusconi, he continues his path to persuade him to rise himself into politics; he left Bibi Mainaghi and he's now engaged with physiotherapist Arianna Rosato, mother of a small child, to whom the man is very attached. Arianna is, however, the ex-wife of Rocco Venturi, father of her son, the corrupt cop killed by Leo. He is arrested for being found guilty of the murder but will be pulled out by Luigi Brancato. Being abandoned by Berlusconi goes to the other side as he begins to attend the PdS but in fact he's just studying the moves to return to Berlusconi, but he must also see him with Arianna, who, not believing in his innocence about Rocco's death, will shoot him gunshot.
- Guido Caprino as Pietro Bosco. Always alcoholic and under the influence of narcotics, he is first moved away from the Lega Nord but then rehabilitated following his plentiful gesture in parliament against the Italian Socialist Party, after which he succeeds in gaining a place in the RAI supervisory board against Bortolotti (who leaves his post as a deputy to return to Milan, as tired of the unscrupulous and corrupt life of the capital); through his new position he will unsuccessfully try to get closer to Veronica, but not in the meantime, meanwhile, to finish in bed with her sister, the journalist Giulia. Cutting off Gianfranco Miglio can regain Umberto Bossi.
- Miriam Leone as Veronica Castello. She managed to enter the TV tour that counts as the first ballerina of Bagaglino. She has a personal agent who provides frequent interviews, covers and hosts of prestigious television. But she has a traumatic event and a meeting with Davide Corsi, a gossip journalist who dreams of becoming a writer. He loves her and he will make her reconsider all her life. At the end she decides to enter politics alongside Silvio Berlusconi.
- Domenico Diele as Luca Pastore. Parallel to Mani Pulite investigation continues his personal investigation of malevolence. The meeting with Eve, a HIV-positive girl, will convince him to start looking at his situation under a different perspective. He will be able to uncover the scandal of the infected blood, because of which he has become sick, then decides to leave Italy with Eva, and to go to Panama to spend there the little time he has to live on.
- Tea Falco as Beatrice "Bibi" Mainaghi. At the top of the family business, close to the prosecutor's inquiries on one side and his mafia business partners on the other. She will decide to leave this situation when she knows that her father Michele did not actually commit suicide but was assassinated by order of Luigi Brancato, the mafia boss of the holding Mainaghi's occult partner, deciding to become a collaborator of justice, but the betrayal of his brother Zeno (who seeks to get the job) will be fatal.
- Antonio Gerardi as Antonio Di Pietro. He continues Mani Pulite's investigation with the constant thought of wanting to capture Bettino Craxi. He is in his most popular moment thanks to the Enimont Process.

=== Recurring ===
- Elena Radonicich as Giulia Castello
- Flavio Parenti as Davide Corsi
- Gianfelice Imparato as Gaetano Nobile
- Teco Celio as Gianni Bortolotti
- Giulio Brogi as Alberto Muratori
- Vinicio Marchioni as Massimo D'Alema
- Giovanni Ludeno as Dario Scaglia
- Camilla Semino Favro as Eva
- Gaetano Bruno as Luigi Brancato
- Irene Casagrande as Viola Notte
- Silvia Degrandi as Rachele Manni
- Eros Galbiati as Zeno Mainaghi
- Giuseppe Gandini as Piercamillo Davigo
- Pietro Ragusa as Gherardo Colombo
- Flavio Furno as Roberto Fenati
- Maurizio Lombardi as Paolo Pellegrini
- Thomas Trabacchi as Attilio Arnaldi
- Antonio Piovanelli as Gianfranco Miglio
- Andrea Purgatori as Niccolò Pizzetti
- Benedetta Buccellato as Teresa
- Chiara Conti as Simona Merenda
- Antonio Petrocelli as Francesco De Lorenzo
- Laura Chiatti as Arianna Rosato. Physiotherapist, is the new partner of Leonardo Notte. She is the ex-wife of Rocco Venturi from whom he had a son, to whom Leonardo was very fond of. Having come to know the truth about the death of her ex-husband, she will not believe in Notte's innocence, and when the man gets exonerated, he decides to do justice alone, knocking a gunshot and then fleeing.
- Paolo Pierobon as Silvio Berlusconi. Famous entrepreneur all over the country, he prepares to enter into politics alongside the faithful Marcello Dell'Utri and Leonardo Notte.
- Astrid Casali as Maddalena
- Pia Lanciotti as Baroness Lavagnini
- Luigi Di Fiore as Lucio Corradi

=== Guest ===
- Pamela Villoresi as Leonardo Notte's mother
- Dario Cantarelli as Gustavo Adolfo Rol
