= Antonio Gerardi =

Italian actor

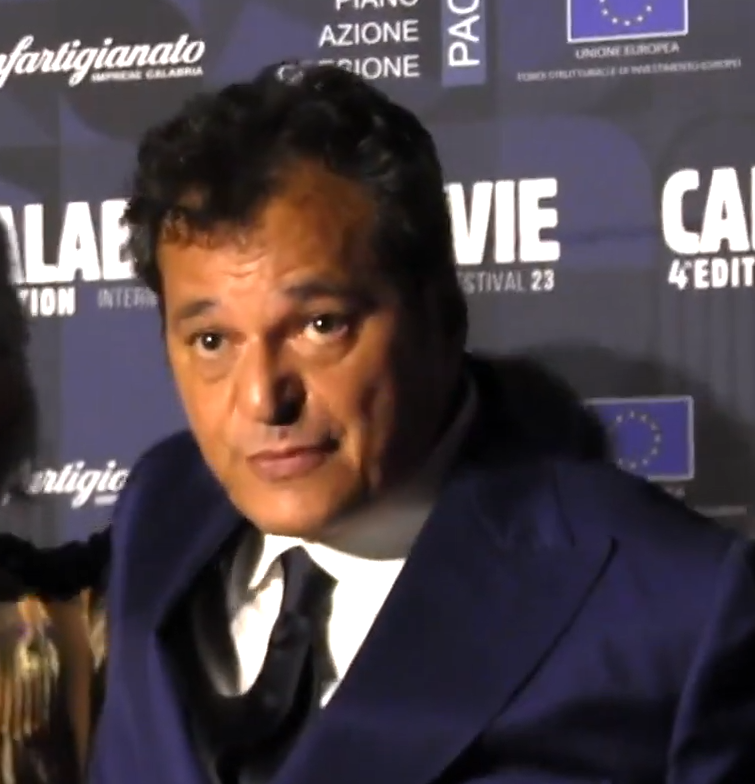
- Gerardi in 2023
- Born: 8 March 1968 (age 58); Potenza, Basilicata, Italy
- Occupations: Actor; radio presenter
- Years active: 1981–present

Antonio Gerardi (born 8 March 1968) is an Italian actor and radio presenter.

== Biography ==
Gerardi was born in Potenza, Basilicata, and grew up in the neighboring municipality of Avigliano. At thirteen, he started as a radio presenter for "Radio Sud", a local radio station in Potenza, and joined "Radio Norba" in 1988. Later, he began working for national stations like "RTL 102.5" and "Radio Kiss Kiss". After several years as a reporter for the TV show Le Iene, in 2007 he made his acting debut with Il rabdomante, directed by Fabrizio Cattani, who discovered him after an argument between Gerardi and a driver over a parking space in Trastevere, Rome, thinking Gerardi had the right skills for acting.

Since then, he has worked in many films and television series. He starred in comedies and dramas such as Basilicata Coast to Coast, Qualunquemente, Diaz – Don't Clean Up This Blood, Balancing Act, Io sono Mia, Padrenostro, The Last Paradise, and Last Night of Amore. On television, he appeared mostly in crime and political series; his most notable roles include "Il sardo" in Romanzo criminale – La serie, Stefano Rambelli in La porta rossa, and Antonio Di Pietro in 1992 and its sequels 1993 and 1994. In 2019, he was recognized as a Paul Harris Fellow by Rotary International. In 2020, he started his own web radio, "Good Fellas Music Station", specializing in the soul, funk, and R&B genres.

== Filmography ==
=== Film ===
Year	Title	Role	Notes
2007	Il rabdomante	Tonino	
2007	The Trial Begins	Donati	
2008	The Past Is a Foreign Land	Lieutenant	Cameo appearance
2009	Questo piccolo grande amore	Chief Reggiani	
2010	20 Cigarettes	The producer	
2010	Tutto l'amore del mondo	Xavier	
2010	Basilicata Coast to Coast	Carmine	
2011	Qualunquemente	Lieutenant Cavallaro	
2011	Il paese delle spose infelici	Vito	
2012	Diaz – Don't Clean Up This Blood	Achille Faleri	
2012	Balancing Act	Pietro	
2012	The Mongrel	Camorrist	Cameo appearance
2013	Tutti contro tutti	Antonio	
2013	Long Live Freedom	Bodyguard	Uncredited
2015	Storie sospese	Ermanno	
2015	Io che amo solo te	Franco Torres	
2016	La cena di Natale	Franco Torres	
2017	Friends by Chance	Alessandro's father	
2017	The Girl in the Fog	Giorgio Levi	
2018	Reckless	Mr. Leonardi	
2019	Io sono Mia	Alberigo Crocetta	
2020	Padrenostro	Francesco	
2020	The Predators	Flavio Vismara	
2021	The Last Paradise	Cumpa' Schettino	
2021	Appunti di un venditore di donne	Tano Casale	
2021	Io sono Babbo Natale	Mauro	
2023	The First Day of My Life	Daniele's father	
2023	Last Night of Amore	Cosimo	
2025	Fuori	Albert	
2025	Make a Wish	Dino	

=== Television ===
Year	Title	Role	Notes
2003–2007	Le Iene	Himself – Reporter	Satirical reportage program
2008–2010	Romanzo Criminale: The Series	Il Sardo	Main role
2010	Crimini	Franco Catalano	Episode: "Mork and Mindy"
2010	Squadra antimafia – Palermo oggi	Ciruzzo Pace	Episode: "Il summit"
2011	La nuova squadra	Michele Malinconico	Main role
2012	Paolo Borsellino: I 57 giorni	Gaspare Mutolo	Television film
2015	1992	Antonio Di Pietro	Main role
2015	Thou Shalt Not Kill	Mauro	Episode: "Episodio 5"
2015	Sotto copertura	Inspector Izzo	Main role (season 1)
2016	Boris Giuliano - Un poliziotto a Palermo	Bruno Contrada	Television film
2016–2018	Non dirlo al mio capo	Rocco Tancredi	Main role (season 2); guest star (season 1)
2017	1993	Antonio Di Pietro	Main role
2017–2019	La porta rossa	Stefano Rambelli	Main role (seasons 1–2)
2019	Imma Tataranni: Deputy Prosecutor	Don Mariano	Recurring role
2019	1994	Antonio Di Pietro	Main role
2019	I ragazzi dello Zecchino d'Oro	Vincenzo	Television film
2020	Vivi e lascia vivere	Renato Ruggero	Main role
2021	La fuggitiva	Giuseppe Mannara	3 episodes
2022	Bang Bang Baby	Nereo Ferraù	Main role
2023	The Lions of Sicily	Prince Filangeri	Recurring role
2023	Noi siamo leggenda	Nunzio Parini	Main role
2024	This Is Not Hollywood	Chief Persichella	Main role
2025	Hotel Costiera	Bignè	Main role
2025	Sara: Woman in the Shadows	Tarallo	Main role
