= Ludovica Rampoldi =

Italian screenwriter (born 1979)

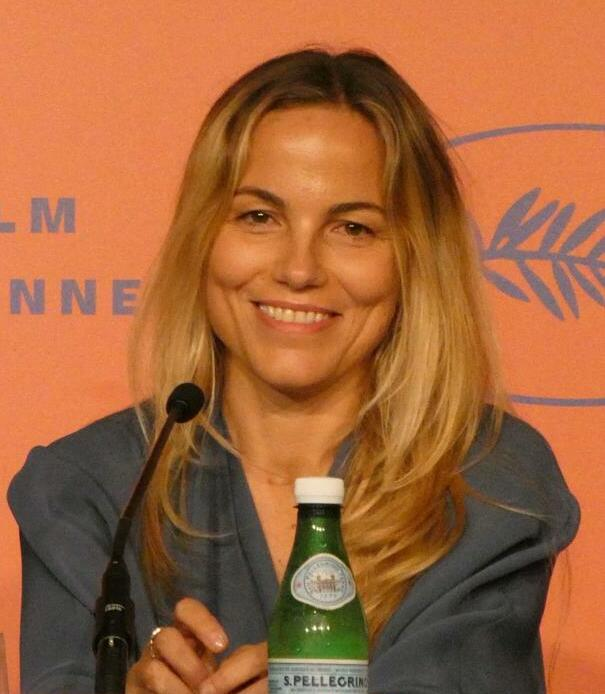
In a press conference at the Cannes Film Festival 2019.

Ludovica Rampoldi (born 1979) is an Italian screenwriter and writer. In 2025 she also directed A Brief Affair. She sometimes teaches at the Centro Sperimentale di Cinematografia in Rome, the Scuola Holden in Turin and the MA in storytelling at the Università IULM in Milan.

== Life ==
=== 2000s ===
Born in Rome, she began her career as one of the writers for The Girl by the Lake, which won a David di Donatello. In 2007, she, Alessandro Fabbri and Stefano Sardo received a special mention at the Premio Solinas - Storie per il Cinema for the synopsis entitled Il cuore della notte. In 2009 the film The Double Hour was released based on that subject and directed by Giuseppe Capotondi. At the 66th Venice International Film Festival its female lead Ksenija Rappoport won the Coppa Volpi and it was nominated for best first film at the European Film Awards.

=== 2010s ===
In 2011 she and Gabriele Romagnoli wrote the synopsis and screenplay for The Jewel, directed by Andrea Molaioli and inspired by the Parmalat collapse. The same year she, Ivan Cotroneo and Monica Rametta wrote the synopsis and screenplay for Kryptonite!, presented at the Festa del Cinema di Roma.

In 2014, she, Sardo and Fabbri collaborated again to produce the synopsis and screenplay for The Invisible Boy, directed by Gabriele Salvatores, which won the European Film Academy Young Audience Award 2015. The same year she and Francesco Bruni wrote the screenplay for Slam, directed by Andrea Molaioli and presented at the Torino Film Festival (2016).

In 2018 she, Bernardo Bertolucci and Ilaria Bernardini wrote the screenplay for Bertolucci's last film The Echo Chamber. In 2019 she, Marco Bellocchio, Valia Santella and Francesco Piccolo wrote the screenplay for The Traitor, directed by Bellocchio himself and part of the official competition selection at the 2019 Cannes Festival. It won the silver nastro for best screenplay and a David di Donatello for best original screenplay, along with many other prizes.

=== TV work ===
For television she, Sardo and Fabbri created 1992, 1993 and 1994 for Sky, all directed by Giuseppe Gagliardi. It debuted at the Berlin Festival in 2015, running to nine seasons.

She wrote for the first three seasons of Gomorrah, alongside Stefano Bises, Leonardo Fasoli and Maddalena Ravagli and for the three seasons of Sky's In Treatment alongside Ilaria Bernadini, Giacomo Durzi, Stefano Sardo, Alessandro Fabbri and Nicola Lusuardi. She, Maurizio Braucci and Massimiliano Virgilio also wrote the TV film Due soldati, directed by Marco Tullio Giordana and presented at the Festival di Locarno in 2017.

=== 2020s ===
In 2022 she, Bellocchio, Stefano Bises and Davide Serino wrote the six episodes of Exterior Night, a miniseries directed by Bellocchio and presented in the Cannes Premiere official selection. Also in 2022 she, David Serino and Giuseppe G. Stasi created and wrote the series The Bad Guy, directed by Stasi and Giancarlo Fontana for Amazon Prime Video.

In 2025 she directed her first feature film, A Brief Affair, and collaborated again with Bellocchio on the screenplay for Primavera.

== Filmography as screenwriter ==
=== Cinema ===
- The Girl by the Lake, directed by Andrea Molaioli (2006)
- The Double Hour, directed by Giuseppe Capotondi (2009)
- The Jewel, directed by Andrea Molaioli (2011)
- Kryptonite!, directed by Ivan Cotroneo (2011)
- The Invisible Boy, directed by Gabriele Salvatores (2014)
- Slam, directed by Andrea Molaioli (2017)
- The Invisible Boy: Second Generation, directed by Gabriele Salvatores (2018)
- The Traitor, directed by Marco Bellocchio (2019)
- Exterior Night, directed by Marco Bellocchio (2022)
- Una storia nera, directed by Leonardo D'Agostini (2024)
- My Tennis Maestro, directed by Andrea Di Stefano (2025)
- A Brief Affair, directed by Ludovica Rampoldi (2025)
- Primavera, directed by Damiano Michieletto (2025)
- No Pain, directed by Gianni Amelio (2026)

=== TV series ===
- In Treatment (2013-2017)
- Gomorra - La serie (2014-2017)
- 1992, directed by Giuseppe Gagliardi (2015)
- 1993, directed by Giuseppe Gagliardi (2017)
- 1994, directed by Giuseppe Gagliardi and Claudio Noce (2019)
- Corpo libero, directed by Cosima Spender and Valerio Bonelli – Paramount+ (2022)
- The Bad Guy, directed by Giancarlo Fontana and Giuseppe G. Stasi – Prime Video (2022)
- The Lions of Sicily, directed by Paolo Genovese – Disney+ (2023)

=== TV films ===
- Due soldati, directed by Marco Tullio Giordana – film TV (2017)
