= Roma Elastica =

2026 film by Bertrand Mandico

- Theatrical release poster
- Directed by: Bertrand Mandico
- Screenplay by: Bertrand Mandico
- Produced by: Thomas Verhaeghe; Mathieu Verhaeghe; Marco Alessi; Daniele Segre
- Starring: Marion Cotillard; Noémie Merlant; Martina Scrinzi; Agnese Claisse; Isabella Ferrari; Maurizio Lombardi; Milutin Dapcevic; Josephine Thiesen; Michele Bravi; Alessio Gallo; Ondina Quadri; Tea Falco; Zlatko Burić; Ornella Muti; Franco Nero
- Cinematography: Nicolas Eveilleau
- Edited by: Laure Saint-Marc
- Music by: Pierre Desprats
- Production companies: Atelier de Production; Redibis Film; Dugong Films; Rai Cinema
- Distributed by: Condor Distribution (France); Europictures (Italy)
- Release dates: 21 May 2026 (Cannes); 23 December 2026 (France)
- Running time: 107 minutes
- Countries: France; Italy
- Languages: English; French; Italian

Roma Elastica is a 2026 surrealist fantasy comedy-drama film written and directed by Bertrand Mandico, starring Marion Cotillard and Noémie Merlant, with Isabella Ferrari, Tea Falco, Maurizio Lombardi, Ornella Muti, Martina Scrinzi and Franco Nero in supporting roles. The film is a co-production between France and Italy and was shot at the Cinecittà Studios in Rome, and also in Nice and La Gaude in France between 26 May and 18 June 2025. It is described as "a tribute to some of the great masters and legends of Italian cinema", as it follows an actress who is going to shoot what may be her last film in Rome in 1982.

The film had its world premiere at the Midnight Screenings section of the 2026 Cannes Film Festival on 21 May, where it competed for the Queer Palm. It won the Best Director award at the 2026 Fantastic Fest. It will be released theatrically in France by Condor Distribution on 23 December 2026.

== Premise ==
In 1982, Eddie, a French actress on the verge of collapse, goes to Rome to shoot a science-fiction film that may also be her last one.

== Cast ==
- Marion Cotillard as Eddie
- Noémie Merlant as Valentina
- Martina Scrinzi as Lilia
- Agnese Claisse as Viva
- Isabella Ferrari as Claudia
- Maurizio Lombardi as Andrea
- Milutin Dapcevic as Marco
- Josephine Thiesen as Verde
- Michele Bravi as Rosso
- Alessio Gallo as Grigio
- Ondina Quadri as Azzurro
- Tea Falco as Pupi
- Zlatko Burić as The old actor
- Ornella Muti as TV host
- Franco Nero as The old filmmaker
- Martina La Manna as Young Eddie
- Coco Labbée
- Michelangelo Dalisi
- Toni Pandolfo
- Christophe Bier
- Simone Zambelli
- PierGiuseppe Di Tanno
- Maziar Firouzi

== Production ==
=== Development ===
Bertrand Mandico wrote and directed the film, a co-production between France's Atelier de Production and Italy's Redibis Film and Dugong Films, in collaboration with Rai Cinema and with support from the Italian Ministry of Culture. In December 2023, it was reported that the film had been granted €25.000 in funding from CNC's commission for assistance for the co-development and co-production of Franco-Italian cinematographic and audiovisual works. On 19 May 2024, producers Thomas and Mathieu Verhaeghe told French magazine Le Film français that they were going to produce the film.

On 28 May 2025, Variety reported that the film's plot details are being kept under wraps, and Cinecittà's CEO Manuela Cacciamani announced during a press conference that Roma elastica "is a tribute to some of the great masters and legends of Italian cinema."

Mandico's frequent collaborator Nicolas Eveilleau serves as director of photography. The costumes were designed by Pauline Jacquard. The score was composed by Pierre Desprats.

=== Casting ===
On 20 December 2024, Vogue France announced that Marion Cotillard will play the film's lead, an actress who is going to shoot her latest film in Rome in the 1980s, and that Alba Rohrwacher and Jasmine Trinca were also in the cast. On 25 April 2025, Noémie Merlant joined the cast. On 28 May 2025, Maurizio Lombardi, Ornella Muti, Martina Scrinzi, Franco Nero and Isabella Ferrari joined the cast. While Trinca was no longer in the cast according to Cinecittà's website.

In July 2025, Cinecittà's website added Agnese Claisse, Milutin Dapcevic, Zlatko Burić, Josephine Thiesen, Michele Bravi, Alessio Gallo, Ondina Quadri, Tea Falco, Coco Labbée, Michelangelo Dalisi, Toni Pandolfo, Christophe Bier, Martina La Manna, Simone Zambelli, PierGiuseppe Di Tanno, and Maziar Firouzi to the ensemble, while Rohrwacher was no longer in the cast.

=== Filming ===
Filming was originally scheduled to begin in January 2025, but it was later postponed to the end of May 2025. Filming took place in Nice and La Gaude in France, and at Cinecittà studios in Rome, Italy. Shooting began on 26 May 2025, and wrapped on 18 June 2025.

French cinematographer Nicholas Eveilleau shot the production in 35mm film.

== Release ==
The film had its world premiere at the 2026 Cannes Film Festival in the Midnight Screenings section on 21 May. It will be released theatrically in France by Condor Distribution on 23 December. Europictures will release the film in Italy. The film made its North American premiere in main competition at the Fantastic Fest on 18 September 2026, where it won the award for Best Director. Rapid Eye Movies will release the film in Germany on 11 March 2027.

== Reception ==
=== Critical response ===
Amber Wilkinson of Screen International wrote: "Mandico's excess all areas approach may not be for everyone but Marion Cotillard's fully committed performance at the heart of Roma Elastica has just about enough magnetism to pull the film back from the unruly brink."

Martin Kudlac of ScreenAnarchy wrote that Roma Elastica "is a cinephile phantasmagoria that, despite Mandico's deliriously transgressive "incoherent" style and strange humor, turns out to be fairly accessible, even to non-Mandico aficionados."

=== Accolades ===
Award / Film Festival	Date of ceremony	Category	Recipient(s)	Result	Ref.
Cannes Film Festival	23 May 2026	Queer Palm	Bertrand Mandico	Nominated	
Fantastic Fest	24 September 2026	Best Film	Bertrand Mandico	Nominated	
Fantastic Fest	24 September 2026	Best Director	Bertrand Mandico	Won	
Strasbourg European Fantastic Film Festival	4 October 2026	Crossovers Competition - Feature Film	Bertrand Mandico	Nominated	
Strasbourg European Fantastic Film Festival	4 October 2026	Special Jury Mention	Bertrand Mandico	Won	
