= Put Grandma in the Freezer =

2018 Italian comedy film

- Film poster
- Italian: Metti la nonna in freezer
- Directed by: Giancarlo Fontana; Giuseppe Stasi
- Written by: Fabio Bonifacci; Nicola Giuliano
- Starring: Fabio De Luigi; Miriam Leone
- Cinematography: Valerio Azzali
- Edited by: Giancarlo Fontana
- Music by: Francesco Cerasi
- Distributed by: 01 Distribution
- Release date: 15 March 2018 (Italy)
- Running time: 100 minutes
- Country: Italy
- Language: Italian

Put Grandma in the Freezer (Italian: Metti la nonna in freezer) is a 2018 black comedy film directed by Giancarlo Fontana and Giuseppe Stasi.

== Plot ==
Claudia, a young woman who runs a financially strapped company specializing in art restoration, lives with her elderly grandmother, Birgit, whose pension is her primary source of income. When Birgit unexpectedly dies of natural causes, a desperate Claudia hides the corpse in a freezer and resorts to a series of elaborate deceptions to keep up the charade that her grandmother is alive so she can continue to receive pension payments. This makes her the target of Simone Recchia, an overzealous police detective specializing in fraud (and who happens to also be romantically interested in her).

== Cast ==
- Fabio De Luigi as Simone Recchia
- Miriam Leone as Claudia Maria Lusi
- Lucia Ocone as Rossana
- Marina Rocco as Margie
- Francesco Di Leva as Gennaro
- Susy Laude as Marta
- Carlo De Ruggieri as Palumbo
- Maurizio Lombardi as Rambaudo
- Eros Pagni as Augusto
- Barbara Bouchet as Grandma Birgit
- Giovanni Esposito as the corrupt politician
- Paolo Bessegato as the General
- Nando Irene as Giorgio / Ugo Lavecchia
