= Guido Caprino =

Italian film, television, and theater actor

- Caprino in 2026
- Born: 3 January 1974 (age 52); Taormina, Italy
- Occupation: Actor

Guido Caprino (born 3 January 1974) is an Italian stage, film and television actor.

== Life and career ==
Born in Taormina, Caprino grew up in Nizza di Sicilia and graduated as a dental technician in Messina. He then moved to Milan, where he worked as an advertising model.

After attending several drama courses, Caprino got his first roles on stage and on television in the mid-2000s. He had his breakout in 2007, with the title role in the RAI TV-series Il commissario Manara.

== Filmography ==
=== Films ===
| Year | Title | Role(s) | Notes |
|---|---|---|---|
| 2006 | The Wedding Director | Bodyguard | Cameo appearance |
| 2007 | I Viceré | Giovannino | |
| 2008 | Sono viva | Adriano Resti | |
| 2008 | Un amore di Gide | Filippo Baiamonte | |
| 2009 | The White Space | Pietro | |
| 2009 | Meno male che ci sei | Giovanni | |
| 2010 | We Believed | Felice Orsini | |
| 2012 | Breve storia di lunghi tradimenti | Giulio Rovedo | |
| 2015 | I calcianti | Filippo "Bimbo" | |
| 2016 | Sweet Dreams | Massimo's father | |
| 2017 | Redoubtable | Bernardo Bertolucci | |
| 2020 | Tutti per 1 - 1 per tutti | Cyrano | |
| 2021 | The Guest Room | Giulio | |
| 2021 | Il mio corpo vi seppellirà | Colonel Romano | |
| 2021 | With or Without You | Tommaso | |
| 2022 | Per niente al mondo | Bernardo | |
| 2025 | In the Hand of Dante | Guido Cavalcanti | |
| 2026 | A Common Story | Mauro | |

=== Television ===
| Year | Title | Role(s) | Notes |
|---|---|---|---|
| 2003–2004 | Vento di ponente | Alessandro | Main role (season 2); 15 episodes |
| 2005 | Una famiglia in giallo | Guido | Episode: "Biscotti al veleno" |
| 2005 | Matilde | Nicola | Television movie |
| 2006 | L'ultima frontiera | Elias Satta Pintore | Miniseries |
| 2007 | Medicina generale | Andrea Lecci | Episodes: "La scelta di Anna"; "Madri" |
| 2007, 2010 | Crimini | Cristiano Malavasi / Fabio Porzio | Episodes: "Disegno di sangue"; "Little Dream" |
| 2008 | Amiche mie | Giorgio | Recurring role; 8 episodes |
| 2008 | L'ultimo padrino | Michele Doni | Television movie |
| 2009–2011 | Il commissario Manara | Luca Manara | Lead role; 24 episodes |
| 2012 | A farsi spenti la notte | Stefano De Luca | Television movie |
| 2013 | In Treatment | Dario | Main role (season 1); 8 episodes |
| 2015 | 1992 | Pietro Bosco | Main role; 10 episodes |
| 2015 | Sotto copertura | Antonio Iovine | Miniseries |
| 2016–2018 | Medici | Marco Bello | Main role (season 1), guest star (season 2); 10 episodes |
| 2017 | 1993 | Pietro Bosco | Main role; 8 episodes |
| 2018 | Il miracolo | Fabrizio Pietromari | Lead role; 8 episodes |
| 2018 | Romanzo familiare | Agostino Pagnotta | Main role; 12 episodes |
| 2019 | 1994 | Pietro Bosco | Main role; 7 episodes |
| 2022 | That Dirty Black Bag | Bronson | Main role; 8 episodes |
| 2025 | The Art of Joy | Carmine | |
