= The Double Hour =

- The Double Hour DVD cover
- Directed by: Giuseppe Capotondi
- Written by: Alessandro Fabbri; Ludovica Rampoldi; Stefano Sardo
- Produced by: Francesca Cima; Nicola Giuliano
- Starring: Filippo Timi; Kseniya Rappoport
- Cinematography: Tat Radcliffe
- Edited by: Guido Notari
- Music by: Pasquale Catalano
- Distributed by: Medusa Film
- Release dates: September 10, 2009 (Venice); October 9, 2009 (Italy)
- Running time: 102 minutes
- Country: Italy
- Language: Italian
- Budget: €2.8 million $4.3 million
- Box office: $2,848,165

The Double Hour (Italian: La doppia ora) is a 2009 Italian romantic thriller film. It is directed by Giuseppe Capotondi, produced by Francesca Cima and Nicola Giuliano, and stars Filippo Timi and Kseniya Rappoport. Principal photography began in October 2008 in Turin, Italy. The film opened in Italy on October 9, 2009, after premiering in competition at Venice Film Festival in September 2009, where it eventually won the Volpi Cup award for Best Actress for Rappoport. It was also screened at the 2009 Toronto Film Festival. Samuel Goldwyn Films released The Double Hour in the US on April 15, 2011.

== Plot ==
Sonia, a maid in a hotel in Turin, is cleaning a guest's bathroom when the guest apparently jumps out the bedroom window to her death.

Later, Sonia attends a speed dating event where she meets Guido, a former policeman who now works as a security guard. They strike up a friendship, and spend some time together after the event. As they part, Guido notices that the time is 23:23 - a double hour, when the hour and minute are the same. He believes that at such times, one may make a wish and it will be granted - although he admits to Sonia that it doesn't always work.

Some days later, Guido takes Sonia to the country villa where he works. The villa has an elaborate security system, but Guido disables part of the system so that the two of them can go for a walk in the grounds.

In the woods, they are ambushed by an armed man and Guido is knocked unconscious. Waking up in the villa, he is forced by armed men in balaclava to disable the security system. The robbers systematically loot the villa of its art treasures and other valuables. As they leave, the leader of the gang menaces Sonia, suggesting he is about to rape her. Enraged, Guido launches himself at him. They struggle, and a shot is fired, but it is not clear what happened next.

Sonia is shown back at work, then visiting Guido's grave-site. She is distracted at work, frequently seeing glimpses of Guido's face, sometimes at a double hour. She is questioned by Dante, a policeman and former colleague of Guido, who suspects the robbery at the villa may have been an inside job. Dante gives her a photograph which appears to show her with Guido in Buenos Aires, although she has never been there.

Sonia feels her sanity slipping away as her visions of Guido become more frequent and elaborate. Finally she is devastated when she hears that her friend and workmate, Margherita, has committed suicide by jumping out a window.

At Margherita's funeral, Sonia is distraught when the officiating priest names the deceased as Sonia instead of Margherita. Bruno, a regular guest at the hotel, takes Sonia away in his car. He gives her a flask which he says contains coffee and a hint of liqueur. Sonia drinks, and is drugged. Bruno drives to a wooded area and drags Sonia out of the car, wrapping her in a plastic sheet and burying her in a shallow grave. Sonia blacks out, and is at the point of death when Guido digs her up and rescues her.

Actually, Sonia is recovering from unconsciousness in a hospital. She learns that only three days have elapsed since the robbery, and everything she experienced since was only her imagination, as she lay in coma. She was wounded in the head by that gunshot. And Guido and Margherita are both alive and well.

Guido is made aware when Dante tells him that Sonia has a criminal past, when 12 years earlier she helped her boyfriend rob her father's home, but Guido asks they be left in peace. Guido goes to see the speed-dating organizer to tell her he no longer needs her events, but when she tells him that Sonia specifically asked to meet him, Dante's suppositions are confirmed to Guido. He goes to her apartment and has sex with her, but the next morning she tells him she has to go see Margherita. He, knowing she is leaving him as Dante had suggested she would, follows her surreptitiously, and, in the airport garage, sees her meet the robbery gang leader, whom she embraces and kisses, and who bears a resemblance to Guido. He eavesdrops on their conversation with a shotgun microphone, and learns that he was not supposed to have survived the robbery. As the couple get into an elevator, Sonia sees Guido, sitting in his car, who is in the process of calling Dante. Guido looks at Sonia, and she looks at him, unsure. The elevator door closes, and Guido hangs up, not reporting anything to Dante.

Nervously, Sonia boards a flight to Buenos Aires using a false identity. She notices that the boarding time is 20:20 - a double hour, and dwells to think for a moment.

In the final scenes, Guido is forlorn, and back speed-dating, while Sonia and the gang leader are shown being photographed together in Buenos Aires.

== Cast ==
- Filippo Timi as Guido
- Kseniya Rappoport as Sonia
- Antonia Truppo as Margherita
- Gaetano Bruno as Riccardo
- Fausto Russo Alesi as Bruno
- Michele Di Mauro as Dante
- Lorenzo Gioielli as a hotel manager
- Lidia Vitale as Rossa (speed dating)
- Giampiero Judica as a man (speed dating)
- Roberto Accornero as a man (speed dating)
- Lucia Poli as Marisa
- Giorgio Colangeli as an elderly priest

== Reception ==
=== Critical response ===
On review aggregator website Rotten Tomatoes, the film holds 82% approval rating, based on 67 reviews with an average rating of 7.1/10. The website's critical consensus states: "Rich in atmosphere and cunningly told, The Double Hour is a pleasurable puzzle that will keep audiences guessing throughout". On Metacritic, The Double Hour holds a 72 out of a 100 rank based on 22 critics, indicating "generally favorable reviews".

Stephen Holden of The New York Times wrote "With its extremely tight editing and breakneck pace, The Double Hour is strung through with small jolts that may or may not be leads in a circuitous pursuit of the truth". Natasha Senjanovic of The Hollywood Reporter had praised Giuseppe Capotondi, calling his debut feature "a smart psychological thriller" citing that "the one fatal, [and stereotypical] flaw that Slavic women in Italian television and cinema must be dark, tormented characters who hardly ever smile".

According to Lisa Schwarzbaum of Entertainment Weekly: "Nothing in this enjoyably twisty, cool/hot, genre-grafting Italian psychological thriller by Giuseppe Capotondi is what it seems". Adding that "the more you try to solve the narrative puzzle, the more you may want to watch it again — or at least argue about what’s real".

Beth Accomando of KPBS Public Media called The Double Hour "[a] sleek Euro thriller", while Peter Galvin of Australia-based SBS wrote "The Double Hour has the visceral impact of, say, mystery TV. Not very memorable at all, really".

Walter Addiego of the San Francisco Chronicle praised the film also, but mentioned of one caveat: "Ultra-teasing narratives" which he also calls "gimmickry" and "a problem" with the film.

The film also received praise from Slant Magazine's Jesse Cataldo who compared the film to The Postman Always Rings Twice, and from Boyd van Hoeij of Variety who called the film a "pic" that "showcases the acting chops and engaging screen presence of Ksenia Rappoport".

=== Awards and nominations ===
- 66th Venice International Film Festival:
  - Won: Best Actress (Kseniya Rappoport)

== Remake ==
In 2009, the producer of the film Nicola Giuliano announced that there are a lot of requests from the US to buy the rights to produce an English-language remake.

During the Venice Film Festival the cast and director joked with journalists about the possibility of an American remake with Clive Owen and Naomi Watts in the main roles.
