= Mario Chiesa (politician) =

Italian politician

Mario Chiesa (Italian pronunciation: [ˈmaːrjo ˈkjɛːza]; born 12 December 1944, Milan) is an Italian former politician and member of the Italian Socialist Party. In 1992, Chiesa was arrested on charges of corruption, leading to the mani pulite trials and, eventually, to a restructuring of Italian politics. In 2009, he was arrested again, under charges related to waste treatment in Milan.
