= Miriam Leone =

Italian actress and beauty queen (born 1985)

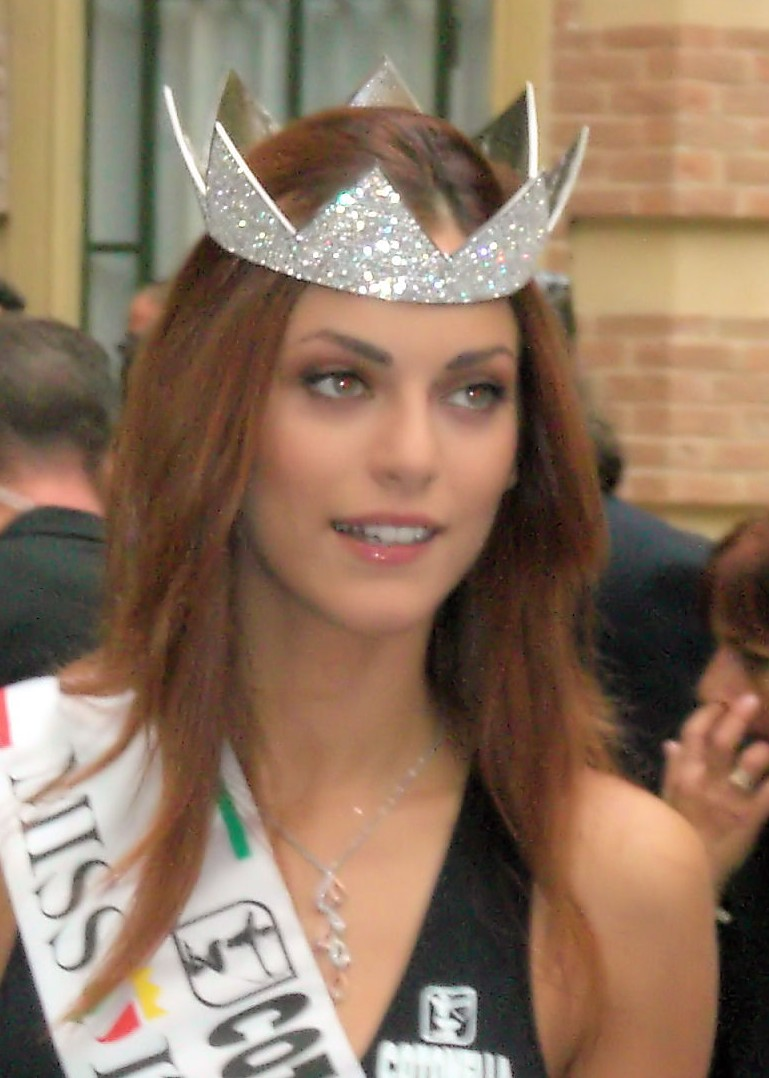
- Leone in 2008
- Born: 14 April 1985 (age 41); Catania, Italy
- Occupation: Actress
- Years active: 2008–present
- Title: Miss Italia 2008
- Spouse: Paolo Carullo (m. 2021)
- Children: 1

Miriam Leone (born 14 April 1985) is an Italian actress and beauty queen. She was crowned Miss Italia 2008.

== Early life ==
Born in Catania, Italy, Leone lived her youth in Acireale, the daughter of a literature teacher, Ignazio Leone, and Gabriella Leotta, employed in the municipality of Aci Catena. She has a younger brother named Sergio. She attended the "Gulli e Pennisi" classical high school in Acireale and at the end of her high school studies enrolled in the Faculty of Letters and Philosophy at the University of Catania, but did not finish her studies.

== Career ==
Leone participated in the Miss Italia contest in 2008 with the title of "Miss Prima dell'anno". After being initially eliminated during the program, she was subsequently reinstated in the competition and won it in the final, as well as the title of "Miss Cinema" awarded by Anna Strasberg of the Actors Studio, who also awarded a scholarship.

Leone co-presented Unomattina estate from 1 June to 11 September on Rai Uno. In 2010 Leone was a judge on Ciak! Si Canta. Since 2010, she has been co-hosting Mattina in famiglia on the channel. She also hosted the Nastro d'Argento award ceremony in 2011.

Leone began her acting career with small roles before obtaining the lead role in television series Distretto di Polizia (2011–12), La dama velata (2015) and Non uccidere (2015–18). She played the main role of Veronica Castello in the Sky Atlantic trilogy 1992, 1993 and 1994. In 2018 she starred as the lead in the black comedy film Put Grandma in the Freezer.

Leone starred as Eva Kant in the Diabolik film trilogy based on the comics series Diabolik. She plays the lead role of Oriana Fallaci in the 2024 TV series Miss Fallaci.

Leone co-hosted the third night of the Sanremo Music Festival 2025 alongside Elettra Lamborghini, Katia Follesa and Carlo Conti.

== Personal life ==
Leone is married to businessman and DJ Paolo Carullo since September 2021. They have a son together.

== Filmography ==
Film
| Year | Title | Role | Notes |
|---|---|---|---|
| 2010 | Parents and Children: Shake Well Before Using | Luigi's girlfriend | Cameo appearance |
| 2010 | Il ritmo della vita | Lizabeth | Television film |
| 2011 | I soliti idioti: Il film | TV reporter | Cameo appearance |
| 2014 | Unique Brothers | Sofia | |
| 2014 | La scuola più bella del mondo | Margherita Rivolta | |
| 2016 | An Almost Perfect Town | Anna | |
| 2016 | At War with Love | Flora Guarneri | |
| 2016 | Sweet Dreams | Agnese | |
| 2018 | Put Grandma in the Freezer | Claudia Maria Lusi | |
| 2018 | The Invisible Witness | Laura Vitale | |
| 2019 | A Cup of Coffee with Marilyn | Oriana Fallaci | Short film |
| 2019 | Love Under House Arrest | Anna | |
| 2021 | Marilyn's Eyes | Clara Pagani | |
| 2021 | Diabolik | Eva Kant | |
| 2022 | Corro da te | Chiara | |
| 2022 | Diabolik: Ginko Attacks! | Eva Kant | |
| 2022 | War - La guerra desiderata | Lea | |
| 2023 | Diabolik: Who Are You? | Eva Kant | |

Television
| Year | Title | Role | Notes |
|---|---|---|---|
| 2011 | Camera Café | Herself | Episode: "Constatazione amichevole" |
| 2011–2012 | Distretto di Polizia | Mara Fermi | Main role (season 11); 26 episodes |
| 2012 | Un passo dal cielo | Astrid | Recurring role (season 2); 7 episodes |
| 2014 | Il tredicesimo apostolo | Miriam | Episode: "Il pianto del demonio" |
| 2015 | La dama velata | Countess Clara Grandi | Lead role; 12 episodes |
| 2015 | 1992 | Veronica Castello | Main role; 10 episodes |
| 2015–2018 | Non uccidere | Valeria Ferro | Lead role; 36 episodes |
| 2016 | Medici | Bianca | Episode: "Original Sin" |
| 2017 | In arte Nino | Erminia Ferrari | Television film |
| 2017 | 1993 | Veronica Castello | Main role; 8 episodes |
| 2019 | 1994 | Veronica Castello | Main role; 8 episodes |
| 2023 | The Lions of Sicily | Giulia Portalupi | Main role |
| 2024 | Miss Fallaci | Oriana Fallaci | Lead role, also co-writer |

== Television ==
| Year | Title | Network | Role |
|---|---|---|---|
| 2008 | Miss Italia | Rai 1 | Contestant, winner |
| 2025 | Sanremo Music Festival | Rai 1 | Co-host |
