= There's No Place Like Home (film) =

2018 Italian comedy-drama film by Gabriele Muccino

- Film poster
- Italian: A casa tutti bene
- Directed by: Gabriele Muccino
- Screenplay by: Gabriele Muccino; Paolo Costella
- Story by: Gabriele Muccino
- Produced by: Marco Belardi
- Starring: Stefano Accorsi; Carolina Crescentini; Elena Cucci; Pierfrancesco Favino; Claudia Gerini; Massimo Ghini; Sabrina Impacciatore; Gianfelice Imparato; Ivano Marescotti; Giulia Michelini; Sandra Milo; Giampaolo Morelli; Stefania Sandrelli; Valeria Solarino; Gianmarco Tognazzi
- Cinematography: Shane Hurlbut
- Edited by: Claudio Di Mauro
- Music by: Nicola Piovani
- Production companies: Lotus Production; Leone Film Group; Rai Cinema; 3 Marys Entertainment
- Distributed by: O1 Distribution
- Release date: 14 February 2018
- Running time: 105 minutes
- Country: Italy
- Language: Italian

There's No Place Like Home (Italian: A casa tutti bene) is a 2018 Italian comedy-drama film directed by Gabriele Muccino.

== Cast ==
- Stefano Accorsi as Paolo
- Carolina Crescentini as Ginevra
- Elena Cucci as Isabella
- Tea Falco as Arianna
- Pierfrancesco Favino as Carlo
- Claudia Gerini as Beatrice
- Massimo Ghini as Sandro
- Sabrina Impacciatore as Sara
- Gianfelice Imparato as the priest
- Ivano Marescotti as Pietro
- Giulia Michelini as Luana
- Sandra Milo as Maria
- Giampaolo Morelli as Diego
- Stefania Sandrelli as Alba
- Valeria Solarino as Elettra
- Gianmarco Tognazzi as Riccardo
