= Tea Falco =

Italian actress

- Born: Teresa Falsone; August 11, 1986 (age 39); Catania, Italy
- Occupation: Actress
- Years active: 2007–present

Tea Falco (born Teresa Falsone; August 11, 1986) is an Italian actress. Her credits include Me and You, Sotto una buona stella and the television show The Young Montalbano. In 2015, she also starred as Beatrice Mainaghi in 1992.

== Filmography ==
=== Film ===
Year	Title	Role(s)	Notes
2012	Me and You	Olivia	
2014	Sotto una buona stella	Lia Picchioni	
2015	La solita commedia: Inferno	Jesus / Sionia / Vigilessa / Maria	
2018	There’s No Place Like Home	Arianna	
2018	Magical Nights	Veronica	
2025	Dangerous Game	Alba Moretti	

=== Television ===
Year	Title	Role(s)	Notes
2012	The Young Montalbano	Grazia	Episode: "Ferito a morte"
2015	1992	Beatrice "Bibi" Mainaghi	Main role
2017	1993	Beatrice "Bibi" Mainaghi	Main role
2018	Thou Shalt Not Kill	Azzurra Castellani	2 episodes
2021	Il pastore	Fabricia Bianchi	Television movie
2021	Maradona: Blessed Dream	Cristiana Sinagra	4 episodes
2024–2025	The Sea Beyond	Loredana Di Meo	Recurring role, 8 episodes
