= Marilyn's Eyes =

- Directed by: Simone Godano
- Screenplay by: Giulia Steigerwalt
- Produced by: Matteo Rovere
- Starring: Stefano Accorsi; Miriam Leone
- Cinematography: Matteo Carlesimo
- Edited by: Gianni Vezzosi
- Music by: Andrea Farri
- Distributed by: 01 Distribution
- Release date: 2021
- Language: Italian

Marilyn's Eyes (Italian: Marilyn ha gli occhi neri) is a 2021 Italian romantic comedy-drama film directed by Simone Godano and starring Stefano Accorsi and Miriam Leone.

== Cast ==
- Stefano Accorsi as Diego
- Miriam Leone as Clara Pagani
- Thomas Trabacchi as Paris
- Mariano Pirrello as Sosia
- Orietta Notari as Susanna
- Marco Messeri as Aldo
- Andrea Di Casa as Chip
- Ariella Reggio as Adelaide
- Valentina Oteri as Gina
- Astrid Meloni as Diana

== Release ==
The film premiered at the 2021 Bari International Film Festival, and was released theatrically by 01 Distribution on 14 October 2021.

== Reception ==
The film won the Globo d'oro for best comedy film. For his performance, Stefano Accorsi was awarded the Ciak D'Oro for best actor. The theme song "Nei tuoi occhi", written by Andrea Farri and Francesca Michielin and performed by Michelin, was nominated as best original song both at David di Donatello and Nastro d'Argento awards.
