= Sotto una buona stella =

2014 Italian comedy film

- Film poster
- Directed by: Carlo Verdone
- Written by: Maruska Albertazzi; Gabriele Pignotta; Pasquale Plastino; Carlo Verdone
- Produced by: Luigi De Laurentiis; Aurelio De Laurentiis
- Starring: Carlo Verdone; Paola Cortellesi; Tea Falco; Lorenzo Richelmy; Eleonora Sergio; Simon Blackhall
- Cinematography: Ennio Guarnieri
- Edited by: Claudio Di Mauro
- Music by: Umberto Scipione; Michele Bravi
- Release date: February 13, 2014 (Italy)
- Running time: 110 minutes
- Country: Italy
- Language: Italian

Sotto una buona stella (lit. 'Under a lucky star') is a 2014 Italian comedy film directed by Carlo Verdone.

== Cast ==
- Carlo Verdone as Federico Picchioni
- Paola Cortellesi as Luisa Tombolini
- Tea Falco as Lia Picchioni
- Lorenzo Richelmy as Niccolò Picchioni
- Eleonora Sergio as Gemma
- Simon Blackhall as Richard
- Guia Zapponi as Margherita
- Fausto Sciarappa as Duilio Tombolini
- Sonia Scotti as Luisa e Duilio's mother
