= A Common Story (film) =

2026 Italian drama film

- Theatrical release poster
- Italian: Una storia
- Directed by: Anna Foglietta
- Screenplay by: Anna Foglietta; Tania Pedroni; Matteo Ferri
- Produced by: Viola Prestieri; Valeria Golino; Nicola Giuliano; Moreno Zani; Malcom Pagani; Anna Foglietta; Paolo Sopranzetti
- Starring: Alba Rohrwacher; Guido Caprino; Caterina Casini; Elio De Capitani
- Cinematography: Andrea Benjamin Manenti
- Edited by: Riccardo Giannetti
- Music by: Rodrigo D’Erasmo
- Production companies: HT Film; Indigo Film; Tenderstories; Blu One Film; Rai Cinema; HBO MAX
- Distributed by: BiM Distribuzione
- Release dates: 8 September 2026 (Venice); 24 September 2026 (Italy)
- Running time: 107 minutes
- Country: Italy
- Language: Italian

A Common Story (Italian: Una storia) is a 2026 Italian romantic drama film directed by Anna Foglietta, in her feature debut, and co-written with Tania Pedroni and Matteo Ferri. It stars Alba Rohrwacher, Guido Caprino, Caterina Casini, and Elio De Capitani.

The film had its world premiere in the Orizzonti section of the 83rd Venice International Film Festival on 4 September 2026. It will be theatrically released in Italy by BiM Distribuzione on 24 September.

== Synopsis ==
Erika and Mauro live a quiet life in the countryside with their daughter, Irene. Their days are built around simple routines and familiar habits. When Irene leaves home to study abroad, the house suddenly feels empty, and the couple's peaceful life begins to change. Erika struggles to find meaning in her new life. Mauro, shaped by a strict and authoritarian father, tries to cope with the emptiness. As they struggle with this new reality, old wounds and forgotten desires come back to the surface. The crisis makes Erika and Mauro realise the truth that they must learn to truly see and understand each other and rebuild their relationship and their love.

== Cast ==
Cast and Crew of the film at the 83rd Venice International Film Festival

- Alba Rohrwacher as Erika
- Guido Caprino as Mauro
- Caterina Casini
- Elio De Capitani

== Production ==
The film was produced with the support of the Italian Ministry of Culture’s Film and Audiovisual Investment Fund and with the contribution of the Lazio Region - Lazio Cinema Lab Call for Submission. Filming ended in March 2026.

== Release ==
A Common Story had its world premiere in the Orizzonti section of the 83rd Venice International Film Festival on 8 September 2026. It had its International Premiere in 'Discovery' at the 2026 Toronto International Film Festival on 14 September 2026.

Subsequently it was released in Italian cinemas by BiM Distribuzione on 24 September 2026.

It also competed in the First Feature Competition at the 2026 BFI London Film Festival on 11 October 2026, and on 20 October at the 62nd Chicago International Film Festival.

Italian sales company True Colours acquired the international sales rights to the film before its world premiere in Orizzonti.

== Reception ==
=== Critical response ===
Reviewing at Venice International Film Festival for Cineuropa, Susanne Gottlieb praised the film for its nuanced portrayal of a marriage unsettled by the departure of the couple's daughter, particularly its viewing of a woman who has sacrificed her own identity for her family. Gottlieb appreciated Anna Foglietta's refusal to provide easy solutions and the emotional performances of Alba Rohrwacher and Guido Caprino, writing, "it is the raw emotion of the leading couple that keeps one fully locked in until the credits roll," but felt that the film's slow pacing and observational style could test "viewers' engagement."

=== Accolades ===
Award	Date of ceremony	Category	Recipient(s)	Result	Ref.
Venice Film Festival	12 September 2026	Orizzonti Award for Best Film	A Common Story	Nominated	
BFI London Film Festival	18 October 2026	Sutherland Award	Anna Foglietta	Nominated	
Chicago International Film Festival	25 October 2026	Golden Hugo (New Directors Competition)	Anna Foglietta	Pending	
