= Stefano Accorsi =

Italian actor (born 1971)

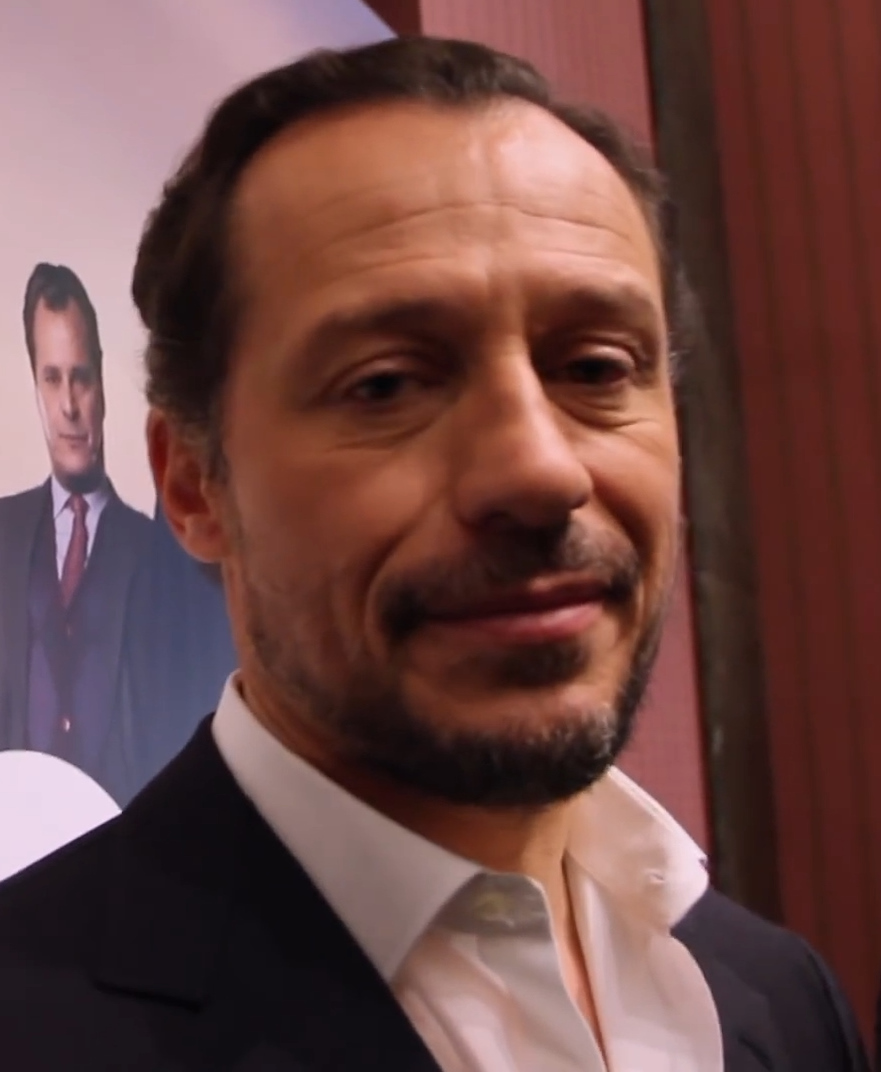
- Accorsi in 2017
- Born: Stefano Lelio Beniamino Accorsi; 2 March 1971 (age 55); Bologna, Emilia-Romagna, Italy
- Occupation: Actor
- Children: 4

Stefano Lelio Beniamino Accorsi (Italian pronunciation: [ˈsteːfano akˈkorsi]; born 2 March 1971) is an Italian actor.

== Early life and background ==
Accorsi was born in Bologna. He graduated from Bologna's Theatrical School in 1993, and acted in the theatre for several years before moving to cinema.

== Career ==
In 1995 he starred in Jack Frusciante è uscito dal gruppo, one of his early breakthrough roles.

In 1998 he appeared in Daniele Luchetti in I Piccoli Maestri, which competed for the Golden Lion at the Venice International Film Festival. In the same year, he received several awards for his performance in Luciano Ligabue's Radiofreccia, including the David di Donatello for Best Actor.

Accorsi subsequently starred in films including L'ultimo bacio (The Last Kiss 2001), Ferzan Özpetek's Le fate ignoranti (His Secret Life 2001) and Nanni Moretti's The Son's Room (2001). Le fate ignoranti was screened in competition at the Berlin International Film Festival and earned Accorsi the Nastri d’Argent for Best Actor for his role.

In 2002, he portrayed poet Dino Campana in Un viaggio chiamato amore (A Journey Called Love), which was presented at the Venice International Film Festival, where Accorsi received the Volpi Cup for Best Actor.

During the 2000s, Accorsi also appeared in several international productions, including Les Brigades du Tigre (2005), La Faute à Fidel with Julie Depardieu, and Emmanuel Mouret’s Un baiser s'il vous plaît (2007). He later reprised his role in Baciami ancora (2010), the sequel to ''L'ultimo bacio''.

Accorsi also appeared in David Blair’s Tabloid TV and Marco Ponti’s Santa Maradona. He later starred in the television film Il giovane Casanova, directed by Giacomo Battiato. After a brief hiatus from filmmaking, Accorsi served on the jury of the Venice International Film Festival in 2003. In 2004, he appeared in Michele Placido’s Ovunque sei and Carlo Mazzacurati’s L'amore ritrovato.

== Personal life ==
Accorsi was engaged to Corsican supermodel Laetitia Casta. They have one son and one daughter together, Orlando, born on 21 September 2006 and Athena, born on 29 August 2009.

He is an agnostic.

== Filmography ==
=== Films ===
Year	Title	Role(s)	Notes
1992	Brothers and Sisters	Matteo	
1992	Un posto	Antonio	
1994	Weird Tales	Trasgressive man	Cameo appearance
1995	Facciamo paradiso	Student	Cameo appearance
1996	Jack Frusciante Left the Band	Alex	
1996	Vesna Goes Fast	The waiter	
1996	My Generation	Agent Bonoli	
1997	Naja	Tonino	
1997	Little Teachers	Gigi	
1998	Radiofreccia	Ivan "Freccia" Benassi	
1999	Outlaw	Horst Fantazzini	
1999	A Respectable Man	Raffaele Della Valle	
2000	April Captains	Salgueiro Maia	
2001	The Last Kiss	Carlo	
2001	The Ignorant Fairies	Michele	
2001	The Son's Room	Tommaso	
2001	Santa Maradona	Andrea Straniero	
2001	Tabloid	Lorenzo	
2002	A Journey Called Love	Dino Campana	
2004	An Italian Romance	Giovanni	
2004	Ovunque sei	Matteo	
2005	Provincia meccanica	Marco Battaglia	
2005	Romanzo Criminale	Inspector Nicola Scialoja	
2006	The Tiger Brigades	Achille Bianchi	
2006	Blame It on Fidel	Fernando	
2007	Saturn in Opposition	Antonio	
2007	Shall We Kiss?	Claudio	
2007	Les deux mondes	Antoine Geller	
2008	Baby Blues	Fabrizio	
2009	Je ne dis pas non	Matteo	
2010	Kiss Me Again	Carlo	
2010	Nous Trois	Philippe Martin	
2011	The Perfect Life	Luca	
2011	Une nuit dans Paris	Dr. Minutillo	Short film
2011	Tous les soleils	Alessandro	
2011	Ruggine	Adult Sandro	
2011	The Dirty Picture	Abraham (voice)	Italian voice-over
2013	L'arbitro	Cruciani	
2013	A Five Star Life	Andrea	
2013	Io non ti conosco	Massimo	Short film; also director
2014	Mafia and Red Tomatoes	Filippo	
2015	The Little Prince	The Fox (voice)	Italian voice-over
2016	Italian Race	Loris De Martino	
2017	Fortunata	Patrizio	
2018	Made in Italy	Riko	
2018	There's No Place Like Home	Paolo	
2019	The Goddess of Fortune	Arturo	
2019	The Champion	Valerio Fioretti	
2020	You Came Back	Marco	
2021	Marilyn's Eyes	Diego	
2022	Hypersleep	David Damiani	
2024	50 Km all'ora	Guido	
2024	The Children's Train	Amerigo	
2024	Despicable Me 4	Maxime Le Mal (voice)	Italian voice-over
2024	Diamonds	Lorendo	
2025	Una figlia	Pietro Battisti	
2025	Amata	Luca	
2025	Primavera	Sanfermo	
2025	La lezione	Professor Walder	
2026	Le cose non dette	Carlo Ristuccia	
2026	Il rumore delle cose nuove	TBA	Post-production

=== Television ===
Year	Title	Role(s)	Notes
1995	Voci notturne	Rinaldo	4 episodes
1998	Più leggero non basta	Marco Crescioni	Television movie
1999	Come quando fuori piove	Lidio	Miniseries
2002	Il giovane Casanova	Giacomo Casanova	Television movie
2009	2009 Cannes Film Festival	Himself / Presenter	Annual ceremony
2012	Mafiosa	Enzo	Main role (season 4); 8 episodes
2013	Il clan dei camorristi	Andrea Esposito	Lead role
2015	1992	Leonardo Notte	Lead role
2016	The Young Pope	Italian Prime Minister	Episode: "Episodio 6"
2017	1993	Leonardo Notte	Lead role
2019	1994	Leonardo Notte	Lead role
2021	Celebrity Hunted - Caccia all'uomo	Himself / Contestant	Reality show (season 2)
2021	È andata cosí	Himself	Docuseries
2022	Vostro onore	Vittorio Pagani	Lead role
2023	Call My Agent - Italia	Himself	Season 1, episode 5
2024	Marconi: L'uomo che ha connesso il mondo	Guglielmo Marconi	Miniseries
2024	The Bad Guy	Stefano Testanuda	Main role (season 2)

=== Music videos ===
Year	Title	Artist(s)	Notes
1995	"Senza averti qui"	883	
1995	"Una canzone d'amore"	883	
2000	"L'ultimo bacio"	Carmen Consoli	
2007	"Passione"	Neffa	
2010	"Baciami ancora"	Jovanotti	

== Awards ==
	Year	Nominated work	Award	Category	Result	Ref
Ciak d'oro	1999	Radiofreccia	Ciak d'oro	Best Actor	Won	
Ciak d'oro	2001	Le fate ignoranti and The Last Kiss	Ciak d'oro	Best Actor	Won	
Ciak d'oro	2013	A Five Star Life	Ciak d'oro	Best Supporting Actor	Nominated	
Ciak d'oro	2020	The Goddess of Fortune	Ciak d'oro	Best Actor	Won	
Ciak d'oro	2022	Marilyn ha gli occhi neri	Ciak d'oro	Best Actor	Won	
David di Donatello	1999	Radiofreccia	David di Donatello	Best Actor	Won	
David di Donatello	2000	Ormai è fatta!	David di Donatello	Best Actor	Nominated	
David di Donatello	2001	L'ultimo bacio	David di Donatello	Best Actor	Nominated	
David di Donatello	2005	Provincia meccanica	David di Donatello	Best Actor	Nominated	
David di Donatello	2013	A Five Star Life	David di Donatello	Best Supporting Actor	Nominated	
David di Donatello	2017	Veloce come il vento	David di Donatello	Best Actor	Won	
European Film Awards	2001	Le fate ignoranti	Audience Award	Best Actor	Nominated	
Flaiano Film Festival	2007	Saturn in Opposition	Flaiano Prize	Best Actor	Won	
Italian National Syndicate of Film Journalists	2001	Le fate ignoranti	Nastro d'Argento	Best Actor	Won	
Italian National Syndicate of Film Journalists	2006	Provincia meccanica	Nastro d'Argento	Best Actor	Nominated	
Venice Film Festival	2002	Un viaggio chiamato amore	Volpi Cup	Best Actor	Won	
