= No Pain =

2026 Italian drama film

- Italian theatrical release poster
- Italian: Nessun dolore
- Directed by: Gianni Amelio
- Written by: Gianni Amelio; Ludovica Rampoldi
- Produced by: Simone Gattoni; Mattia Guerra
- Starring: Alessandro Borghi; Valeria Golino; Valerio Mastandrea
- Cinematography: Diego García
- Edited by: Stefano Mariotti
- Music by: Luan Amelio
- Production companies: Kavac Films; Be Water; Rai Cinema
- Distributed by: 01 Distribution (Italy)
- Release dates: 3 September 2026 (Venice); 23 September 2026 (Italy)
- Running time: 96 minutes
- Country: Italy
- Language: Italian

No Pain (Italian: Nessun dolore) is a 2026 Italian drama film directed by Gianni Amelio, co-written with Ludovica Rampoldi. It stars Alessandro Borghi, Valeria Golino and Valerio Mastandrea.

The film had its world premiere out of competition at the 83rd Venice International Film Festival on 3 September 2026. It was theatrically released in Italy by 01 Distribution on 24 September.

== Cast ==
- Alessandro Borghi as Davide
- Valeria Golino as Elsa
- Valerio Mastandrea

== Production ==
The film was produced by Kavac Films and Be Water, in association with Rai Cinema. It was shot between Rome, Ostia, and Orvieto. Principal cinematography started in February 2026.

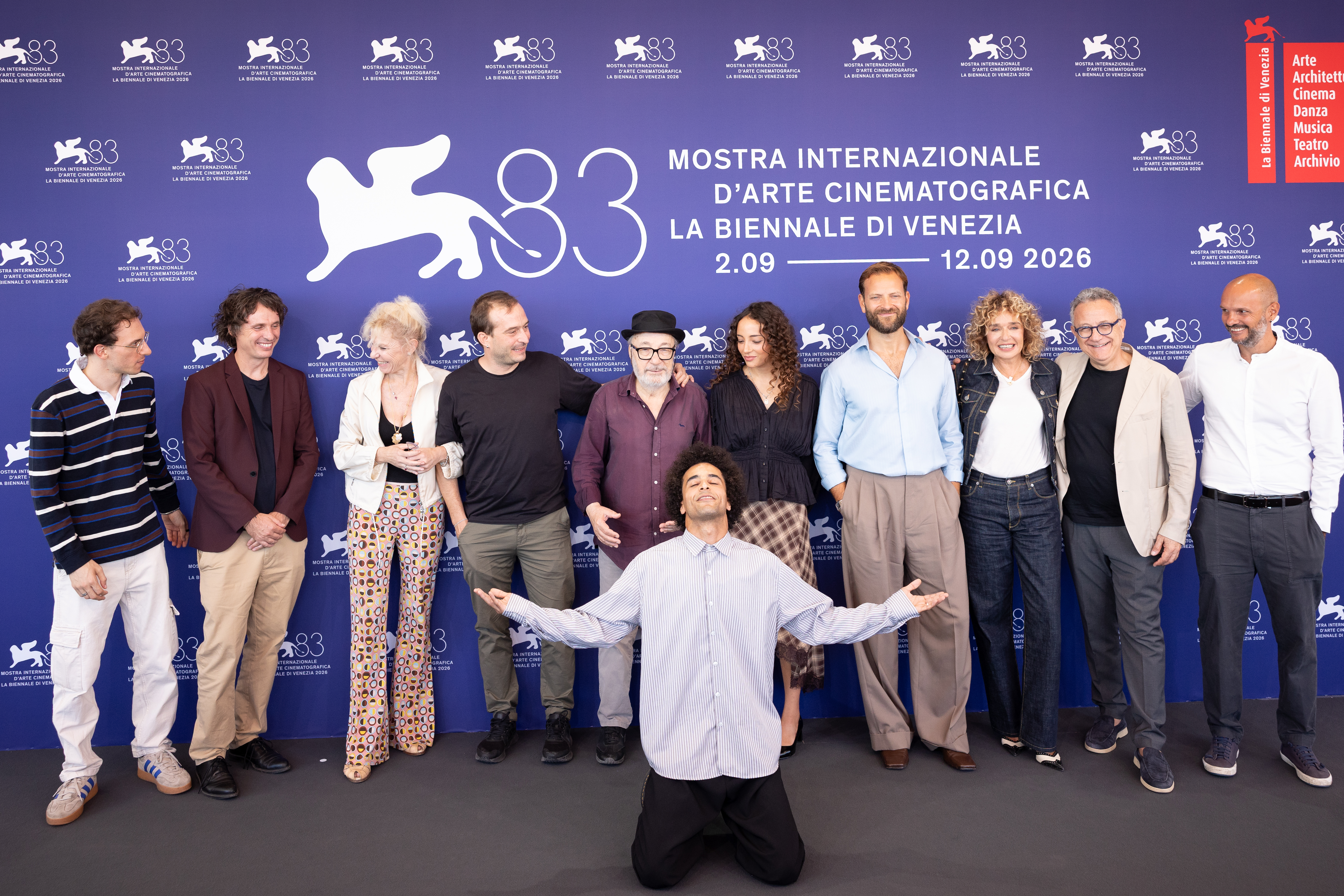
Cast and crew during the 83rd Venice International Film Festival

== Release ==
The film had its world premiere out competition at the 83rd Venice International Film Festival. It was theatrically released in Italy by 01 Distribution on 24 September 2026.

== Reception ==
Frank J. Avella from The Contending called the film one of Amelio's best, and described it as "a compelling, sometimes absurd, look at how humans treat and mistreat one another and how people tend to look away from those in need". Cineuropa 's critic Camillo De Marco criticized the screenplay, lacking "the rhetorical resources needed to make the plot plausible or compelling." Davide Turrini from Il Fatto Quotidiano described it as "one of those classic minimalist, tragically poignant works with a typical Amelio touch, full of silent glances, suspensions of meaning and time".

Alberto Crespi from la Repubblica noted: "Amelio is not interested in immigration as a social issue, but he is deeply interested in immigrants as people who live in our cities as invisible figures.[...] He is interested in the emotional impact that, in our lives and theirs, can be produced by the encounter between human worlds that do not understand each other".
