= The Young Pope =

2016 religious drama TV miniseries

- Promotional poster
- Genre: Drama
- Created by: Paolo Sorrentino
- Written by: Paolo Sorrentino; Stefano Rulli; Tony Grisoni; Umberto Contarello
- Directed by: Paolo Sorrentino
- Starring: Jude Law; Diane Keaton; Silvio Orlando; Javier Cámara; Scott Shepherd; Cécile de France; Ludivine Sagnier; Toni Bertorelli; James Cromwell; Stefano Accorsi
- Opening theme: "Watchtower" (Instrumental) prod. by Labrinth
- Composer: Lele Marchitelli
- Countries of origin: Italy; France; Spain
- Original languages: English; Italian
- No. of episodes: 10

Production
- Executive producers: Lorenzo Mieli; Mario Gianani; Viola Prestieri; Paolo Sorrentino; Caroline Benjo; Carole Scotta; Simon Arnal; Jaume Roures; Javier Méndez; Tony Grisoni; John Lyons; Ron Bozman (pilot); Nils Hartmann; Sonia Rovai; Roberto Amoroso
- Producers: Jude Law; Ben Jackson
- Production locations: Rome; Venice; New York City; Los Angeles; South Africa
- Cinematography: Luca Bigazzi
- Editor: Cristiano Travaglioli
- Camera setup: Single-camera
- Running time: 46–60 minutes
- Production companies: Wildside; Haut et Court TV; Mediapro

Original release
- Network: Sky Atlantic (Italy); HBO (US); Canal+ (France)
- Release: 21 October – 18 November 2016

Related
- The New Pope

The Young Pope is a satirical drama television series created and directed by Paolo Sorrentino for Sky Atlantic, HBO, and Canal+. The series stars Jude Law as the disruptive Pope Pius XIII and Diane Keaton as his confidante, Sister Mary, in a Vatican full of intrigues. The series was co-produced by the European production companies Wildside, Haut et Court TV and Mediapro.

The world premiere of The Young Pope was on 3 September 2016 at the 73rd Venice International Film Festival, where the first two episodes were screened out of competition, the first time in the history of the festival that a TV series has been a part of the program. The series premiered on television on 21 October 2016 on Sky Atlantic in Italy.

The Young Pope was originally designed as a limited series, and was marketed as such, especially in the United States. However, it was later followed by The New Pope, with Law returning and joined by John Malkovich. Production began in Italy in late 2018.

On 14 July 2017, The Young Pope received two nominations for the 69th Primetime Creative Arts Emmy Awards, becoming the first Italian TV series to be nominated for a Primetime Emmy Award.

== Plot ==
A young cardinal from New York City, Lenny Belardo, becomes the pope, the head of the Catholic Church, and the youngest since John Paul II, when the leading contenders of the papal conclave fail to win election. Installed as a compromise candidate, Belardo takes the papal name Pius XIII and immediately proceeds to challenge the established traditions and practices of the Vatican and of the modernist-oriented Second Vatican Council. In one of his first acts he decrees that common people are not worthy to gaze upon the pope's face, and appears to the public on the balcony of St Peter's Basilica shrouded in darkness. Next, during a meeting with the Cardinal Secretary of State, the pope states he will now become directly involved in the political affairs of the Vatican, effectively assuming control of the Secretariat of State of the Holy See.

Alarmed by his radical changes to the Church, several senior cardinals begin a plan to try to control the pope and dissuade him from even more ideas dangerous to the Church. In response the pope installs Sister Mary, the nun who raised him in an orphanage, to serve as his chief adviser, and he publicly denounces several cardinals. He likewise threatens to confiscate all the property of various religious orders, in particular the Franciscans, if they do not accept his unquestioned leadership. Following this, the pope directs that the papal tiara of Pope Paul VI is to be removed from the Basilica of the National Shrine of the Immaculate Conception in Washington, D.C. and returned to the Vatican as his personal crown.

In a last-ditch effort to rein in the pope, the cardinals arrange a meeting between him and the prime minister of Italy, who is subsequently bullied by the pope and threatened with an archaic papal procedure allowing the Church to direct Italian Catholics not to vote in general elections. Amidst fears that at this point the pope is trying to restore the Papal States, it is then discovered he is suffering from massive depression and that all his actions have been driven by his desire to confront his parents, who abandoned him as a boy.

== Cast ==
=== Main ===
- Jude Law as Pope Pius XIII (born Lenny Belardo), the newly elected pope and former archbishop of New York
- Diane Keaton as Sister Mary, an American religious sister, who raised Belardo and Dussolier in an orphanage, has helped him throughout his career and is appointed personal secretary to the Pope
- Silvio Orlando as Cardinal Angelo Voiello, Camerlengo and Cardinal Secretary of State
- Javier Cámara as Monsignor (later Cardinal) Bernardo Gutierrez, Master of Ceremonies of the Holy See
- Scott Shepherd as Cardinal Andrew Dussolier, a missionary, Archbishop of San Pedro Sula, Belardo's longtime friend and a fellow orphan
- Cécile de France as Sofia Dubois, in charge of marketing for the Holy See
- Ludivine Sagnier as Esther, the wife of a member of the Pontifical Swiss Guard
- Toni Bertorelli as Cardinal Caltanissetta, an elderly and powerful master of Vatican politics with inscrutable motives
- James Cromwell as Cardinal Michael Spencer, former archbishop of New York and Belardo's mentor
- Stefano Accorsi as the Prime Minister of Italy

=== Recurring ===
- Gianluca Guidi as Father Federico Amatucci, Cardinal Voiello's confidant
- Ignazio Oliva as Father Valente, one of the Pope's assistants
- Sebastian Roché as Cardinal Michel Marivaux, Prefect of the Congregation for the Causes of the Saints
- Marcello Romolo as Don Tommaso Viglietti (later created a Cardinal), the Pope's and the cardinals' confessor
- Vladimir Bibic as Cardinal Ozolins, President of the Governorate of Vatican City
- Ramón García as Cardinal Aguirre, Ozolins's successor
- Nadee Kammellaweera as Sister Suree, a secretarial worker at the Vatican
- Maurizio Lombardi as Cardinal Mario Assente, Dussolier's predecessor as Prefect of the Congregation of the Clergy
- Daniel Vivian as Domen, the Pope's butler
- Biagio Forestieri as Peter, a member of the Pontifical Swiss Guard and Esther's husband
- Giancarlo Fares as Franco, Girolamo's caregiver
- Unknown actor as Girolamo, Voiello's best friend who has a severe disability
- Carolina Carlsson as the Prime Minister of Greenland
- Camilla Diana as the Virgin Mary
- Franco Pinelli as Tonino Pettola, a charlatan who claims that he can see the Virgin Mother among his sheep flock
- Madalina Bellariu as Elena, an escort
- Tony Plana as Carlos García, a Honduran drug dealer and Maribeth's husband
- Monica Cetti as Contessa Meraviglia, a hedonistic Italian noblewoman
- Rayna Tharani as Maribeth, Cardinal Dussolier's married girlfriend
- Alessia Giulia Trujillo Alva as Blessed Juana
- Andre Gregory as Elmore Coen, a writer
- Guy Boyd as Archbishop Kurtwell, a suspected child molester
- Kevin Jackson as Pete Washington, a potential witness of Kurtwell's crimes
- Jan Hoag as Rose, the manager of a hotel in New York City
- Alex Esola as Freddy Blakestone, an aspiring tennis player that was involved in the Kurtwell case

==== Flashbacks ====
- Allison Case as young Sister Mary
- Frank Gingerich as young Lenny Belardo
- Olivia Macklin as Lenny Belardo's mother
- Jack McQuaid as young Andrew Dussolier
- Collin Smith as Lenny Belardo's father
- Ann Darlington Carr as the Custodian's wife, miraculously cured by Balardo's prayer
- Brian Keane as the Custodian

=== Guests ===
- Massimiliano Gallo as Captain Becchi, a Carabinieri officer
- Emilio Dino Conti as the Italian Prime Minister's advisor
- Marcos Franz as Ángelo Sanchez, a young man whose application to become a priest has been rejected
- Milvia Marigliano as Sister Antonia, a missionary nun serving in Africa
- Nicolas Coster as an American journalist
- Todd Grinnell as Archbishop Kurtwell's assistant
- Troy Ruptash as David Tanistone, Archbishop Kurtwell's secret son

== Episodes ==
No.	Title	Directed by	Written by	Original release date	Italian viewers (millions) (Note: Combined viewers of simulcast on Sky Atlantic and Sky Cinema 1.)
1	"Episode 1"	Paolo Sorrentino	Paolo Sorrentino	21 October 2016	0.743; 0.953 (o.n.)
Lenny Belardo becomes the first American Pope and takes the name of Pius XIII. Shortly after his election, he causes upheaval in the Vatican with his desire to reject both publicity and the liberal philosophy of his predecessor. Sister Mary, the nun who raised Lenny, is brought in as his personal secretary, and immediately establishes herself as the chief rival of the powerful Cardinal Voiello, the Vatican's Secretary of State. Cardinal Spencer, Lenny's mentor and the original favourite for the papacy, is distraught over his loss in the Papal election.
2	"Episode 2"	Paolo Sorrentino	Paolo Sorrentino	21 October 2016	0.743; 0.953 (o.n.)
Lenny shocks the world with his first address, in which he demands Catholics worldwide devote themselves body and soul to God, no matter the consequences. Sister Mary and Cardinal Voiello struggle to control Lenny, who admits that his conservative religious views result from his parents' decision to place him in a Catholic orphanage so they could pursue a hedonistic lifestyle.
3	"Episode 3"	Paolo Sorrentino	Paolo Sorrentino and Stefano Rulli	28 October 2016	0.517
Lenny plans to lead a resurgence of conservative Christianity despite the efforts of Spencer and Voiello. Lenny forces Voiello to reveal that liberal forces in the College of Cardinals blocked the conservative Spencer's election as Pope, resulting in an agreement between the two men to use Lenny as a puppet. When Lenny threatens to excommunicate Voiello, the liberal cardinal is forced to swear loyalty to him. Later, during a chance encounter with Esther, the wife of a Pontifical Swiss Guard, Lenny collapses.
4	"Episode 4"	Paolo Sorrentino	Paolo Sorrentino and Stefano Rulli	28 October 2016	0.517
Lenny arranges for a nun's sister to be brought to the Vatican for burial, then berates the nun at the funeral for crying, accusing her of not believing in God. At Voiello's instigation, Spencer attempts to manipulate Lenny, who then denies him a promotion and severs ties with him. Voiello arranges for Esther to work as an assistant to the Pope in the hope that they will develop a sexual relationship that he can exploit to his advantage. However, Lenny is not tempted and prays to God to help her conceive a child with her lover. Lenny's comments about the gay aide to the attractive female prime minister of Greenland and the fact that the cardinals ignore her lead him to threaten to expel homosexuals from the Vatican, which horrifies Voiello. Lenny is also suspicious of the intentions of Sofia, head of the Vatican's marketing branch and his closest ally outside the priesthood.
5	"Episode 5"	Paolo Sorrentino	Paolo Sorrentino	4 November 2016	0.508
Lenny sidesteps Esther's sexual advances, thwarting Voiello's persistent machinations to bring him down with an illicit sex scandal. Lenny reveals that he already knows everyone's secrets, including those of Voiello, Gutierrez, and Tommaso. The papal tiara arrives, and Lenny finally addresses the cardinals. He controversially announces that the Catholic Church will no longer compromise merely to appease its followers, but will instead become more hard-line and inflexible, dedicating itself to the service of God.
6	"Episode 6"	Paolo Sorrentino	Paolo Sorrentino	4 November 2016	0.508
Six months later, after the birth of Esther's baby, and nine months into his papacy, Voiello warns Lenny that the Church is losing followers. Lenny finally grants an audience with the Prime Minister of Italy, a man of similar age and attractiveness as Lenny. He gives the prime minister a list of shocking and preposterous demands to favour the Church using political blackmail, but the prime minister rejects Lenny's demands. Lenny forces Cardinal Dussolier, his childhood friend and now the cardinal in charge of approving new priests, to block the entrance of new priests who do not adhere to clerical celibacy, regardless of their sexual persuasion. A young seminarian is denied admittance and distraught, he commits suicide in St. Peter's Square.
7	"Episode 7"	Paolo Sorrentino	Paolo Sorrentino and Tony Grisoni	11 November 2016	0.490
Voiello and Dussolier desperately try to make Lenny see the disaster he is unleashing by marginalising the Church. Sister Mary seeks Voiello's support to save the Church, deeply impressing him. Lenny is shocked and excited by the prospect of reuniting with his parents after receiving a gift indicating that they wish to see him, but he exposes them as fakes. The cardinals cut a deal with Spencer, who has a heart-to-heart with Lenny who agrees to resign. Racked by guilt, Dussolier returns to Honduras, but he is killed by a drug lord who felt disrespected because Dussolier had sex with his wife.
8	"Episode 8"	Paolo Sorrentino	Paolo Sorrentino and Tony Grisoni	11 November 2016	0.490
Lenny prays for Dussolier's soul while Sister Mary weeps bitter tears. Sofia counsels the Pope to visit Sister Antonia, a well-publicized missionary in Africa, and surprisingly he agrees. En route, the press are frustrated at Lenny's failure to appear and a journalist asks a pointed question which indicates to Voiello that Kurtwell might be blackmailing the Pontiff. In Africa, the Pope becomes suspicious of Sister Antonia's professed piety and her support for the country's dictator. After his failed confession to an African priest who does not understand English, the priest passes Lenny a note accusing Sister Antonia of controlling and manipulating the water supply. Now aware of local injustices, Lenny delivers an inspiring speech to the country's populace about war and peace, with pointed warnings to its dictator and Sister Antonia. As the Pope's entourage departs, Antonia dies after she drinks from her personal water supply.
9	"Episode 9"	Paolo Sorrentino	Umberto Contarello and Paolo Sorrentino	18 November 2016	0.550
In New York City, Cardinal Gutierrez is convinced of Kurtwell's guilt and desperately tries to convince his former victims to testify, but without success. Meanwhile, as Spencer lies dying in the Vatican, Lenny agrees to relate the miracle he performed as a teenager, successfully imploring God to save a friend's mother from certain death. Back in New York, Gutierrez resorts to unsavoury tactics, entrapping Kurtwell in a compromising homosexual situation. In desperation, Kurtwell releases his blackmail material on Lenny, love letters to a young woman. Kurtwell's overconfidence proves his undoing as Lenny never sent the letters. However, they are so beautiful that after they are published they become an instant sensation. Gutierrez unceremoniously bundles Kurtwell back to the Vatican.
10	"Episode 10"	Paolo Sorrentino	Umberto Contarello and Paolo Sorrentino	18 November 2016	0.550
Impressed with his new conviction and sense of maturity, Lenny asks Gutierrez to take over as his personal secretary, prepared to overlook his homosexuality; however, he banishes Kurtwell to Alaska for his sins against children. Lenny reconciles with Sister Mary and sends her to Africa to take Antonia's place and to be with orphans again. After learning that he himself may be considered for sainthood one day, Lenny agrees to spend Christmas in Guatemala among the patients of Beata Juana. At the last minute, however, Lenny decides to face his demons and heads for Venice instead. At the Basilica San Marco, the Pope finally reveals his face, appearing before thousands of people in the piazza using Beata Juana's words to deliver a homily that touches the crowds and the cardinals alike. However, after seeing a couple in the crowd that looks like his parents, the young pope collapses, leaving his future and that of the Church uncertain.

== Production ==
The Young Pope, the first TV series by Paolo Sorrentino, was produced by Lorenzo Mieli and Mario Gianani, together with the French company Haut et Court TV and the Spanish company Mediapro. The project was financed by Sky, Canal+ and HBO, which contributed 40 million euros, with part of the money coming from the European Regional Development Fund. Production took three years between 2014 and 2016.

The script was written by Sorrentino, Stefano Rulli, Tony Grisoni and Umberto Contarello. The cast, announced between July and August 2015, includes Jude Law as the young pope; Diane Keaton as Sister Mary; James Cromwell, Silvio Orlando, Scott Shepherd, Javier Cámara and Toni Bertorelli. It also includes Cécile de France, Ludivine Sagnier, Guy Boyd, Andre Gregory, Sebastian Roché, Marcello Romolo, Ignazio Oliva, Vladimir Bibic, Daniel Vivian and Nadie Kammalaweera. The main character is almost always seen only from the waist up, to give the impression that he might be soaring. Sorrentino said he inherited this technique from Spike Lee.

Principal photography, which took seven months, started in August 2015 and took place mainly in the Cinecittà studios, where the interior of the Vatican was recreated. Exterior shots and garden scenes were taken at a number of villas, primarily Villa Lante (Bagnaia), Villa Medici, and Orto Botanico dell'Università di Roma "La Sapienza", while some interior shots were also taken inside Palazzo Venezia. Parts of the last episode were shot in piazza San Marco in Venice.

== Broadcast ==
The series premiered on 21 October 2016 on Sky Atlantic in Italy and Sky Atlantic in Germany and Austria, on 27 October 2016 on Sky Atlantic in the United Kingdom and Ireland, on 28 October 2016 on HBO Europe in various European countries, and on 15 January 2017 on HBO and HBO Canada in the United States and Canada. It premiered in Australia on SBS Television on 29 April 2017. In India it was telecast on ZeeCafe.

== Reception ==
The Young Pope received positive reviews in the UK, Ireland, and Italy, and Jude Law's performance garnered praise from Jasper Rees of The Daily Telegraph. However, the Italian weekly Catholic magazine Famiglia Cristiana objected to "caricature-like characters created to appeal to an American audience".

On US review aggregator Metacritic, it has a rating of 68, indicating "generally favorable reviews". The show also gained an 80% positive rating from review aggregator Rotten Tomatoes combining 89 reviews. Its "Critics Consensus" stated: "The Young Pope's original premise and stylish blend of over-the-top melodrama with profane comedy helps overcome an occasionally muddled plot."

Some Catholic reviewers were put off by what they perceived as the series' anti-Catholic stance. Such critics took issue with a presentation of the Church they found to be caricatural and "cartoonish". Other reviewers complained about anti-Catholicism in the entertainment industry more broadly. Some conservative reviewers and traditionalist Catholics praised the show for its portrayal of tradition and authentic religious devotion.

=== Audience viewership ===
In Italy, the two-hour premiere drew the highest rating ever for the pay TV network Sky. With 953,000 viewers overnight, it beat the initial release of Gomorrah and the Italian release of Game of Thrones.

=== Awards and nominations ===
Year	Ceremony	Category	Recipient(s)	Result	Ref.
2017	69th Primetime Creative Arts Emmy Awards	Outstanding Cinematography for a Limited Series or Movie	Luca Bigazzi, Director of Photography	Nominated	
2017	69th Primetime Creative Arts Emmy Awards	Outstanding Production Design for a Narrative Contemporary or Fantasy Program (One Hour or More)	Ludovica Ferrario, Production Designer; Alexandro Maria Santucci, Art Director; Laura Casalini, Set Decorator	Nominated	
2017	75th Golden Globe Awards	Best Actor – Miniseries or Television Film	Jude Law	Nominated	

== Home media release ==
DVD release date			Blu-ray release date	
Region 1	Region 2	Region 4	Region A	Region B
6 June 2017	26 December 2016	28 June 2017	6 June 2017	26 December 2016
