= Citadel: Diana =

2024 Italian spy action television series

- Amazon Prime Video poster
- Genre: Action; Drama; Spy thriller
- Based on: Citadel
- Developed by: Alessandro Fabbri
- Showrunner: Gina Gardini
- Written by: Alessandro Fabbri; Ilaria Bernardini; Laura Colella; Gianluca Bernardini; Giordana Mari
- Directed by: Arnaldo Catinari
- Starring: Matilda De Angelis; Lorenzo Cervasio; Maurizio Lombardi; Julia Piaton; Thekla Reuten; Daniele Paoloni; Bernhard Schütz; Filippo Nigro
- Composer: Mokadelic
- Country of origin: Italy
- Original languages: Italian; English; French
- No. of seasons: 1
- No. of episodes: 6

Production
- Executive producers: Gina Gardini; Riccardo Tozzi; Marco Chimenz; Giovanni Stabilini; Anthony Russo; Joe Russo; Mike Larocca; Angela Russo-Ostot; Scott Nemes; David Weil
- Producer: Alessandra Maman
- Cinematography: Diego Dussuel
- Editor: Patrizio Marone
- Running time: 35–50 minutes
- Production companies: Amazon MGM Studios; AGBO; Midnight Radio; Super Epic; Cattleya

Original release
- Network: Amazon Prime Video
- Release: 10 October 2024

Related
- Citadel; Citadel: Honey Bunny (India)

Citadel: Diana is an Italian spy action television miniseries developed by Alessandro Fabbri, based on the American television series Citadel. It was released on Amazon Prime Video on 10 October 2024 and was cancelled after one season.

== Cast ==
- Matilda De Angelis as Diana Cavalieri
- Lorenzo Cervasio as Edo Zani
- Maurizio Lombardi as Ettore Zani
- Julia Piaton as Cécile Martin
- Thekla Reuten as Julia Ward Zani
- Bernhard Schütz as Wolfgang Klein
- Filippo Nigro as Gabriele
- Giordana Faggiano as Sara Cavalieri
- Daniele Paoloni as Matteo Spadaro
- Marouane Zotti as Luca Pavan
- Jun Ichikawa as Giada
- Maxim Mehmet as Rainer Weber
- Carlo Sciaccaluga as Enrico Zani
- Sonia Bonny as Agathe

== Episodes ==
No.	Title	Duration	Original release date
1	"Split in Two" (Divisa in Due)	50 min	10 October 2024
2	"War" (Guerra)	47 min	10 October 2024
3	"Together" (Insieme)	48 min	10 October 2024
4	"The Zanis" (Gli Zani)	35 min	10 October 2024
5	"Attack" (Assalto)	45 min	10 October 2024
6	"Jupiter" (Giove)	42 min	10 October 2024

== Production ==
Filming for the series began in October 2022 and was completed in May 2023. It was filmed in Italy, as well as Lugano, Mendrisio, and Saint-Gotthard Massif in Switzerland. Mokadelic composed the score, which includes the main title theme by Alex Belcher, arranged and produced by the band. The soundtrack was released by Milan Records.

== Release ==
The series was released on Amazon Prime Video on 10 October 2024. In April 2025, the series was canceled after one season with the intention to integrate some of its storylines into Citadel's second season.
