= 1994 (Italian TV series) =

Italian television series

- Genre: Drama
- Created by: Alessandro Fabbri; Ludovica Rampoldi; Stefano Sardo
- Based on: an original idea by Stefano Accorsi
- Directed by: Giuseppe Gagliardi; Claudio Noce
- Starring: Stefano Accorsi; Guido Caprino; Miriam Leone; Giovanni Ludeno; Antonio Gerardi; Paolo Pierobon
- Country of origin: Italy
- No. of episodes: 8

Production
- Running time: 60 minutes

Original release
- Network: Sky Atlantic
- Release: October 4 – October 25, 2019

1994 is an Italian television series. It is the third and final installment of the Sky Atlantic TV series trilogy centered on the birth of the so-called "Second Republic", preceded by 1992 and 1993. It largely covers Silvio Berlusconi's first term in office as Prime Minister.

== Cast ==
=== Main ===
- Stefano Accorsi as Leonardo Notte
- Guido Caprino as Pietro Bosco
- Miriam Leone as Veronica Castello
- Giovanni Ludeno as Dario Scaglia
- Antonio Gerardi as Antonio Di Pietro
- Paolo Pierobon as Silvio Berlusconi

== See also ==
- List of Italian television series
