= Mani pulite =

Italian political corruption scandal in the 1990s

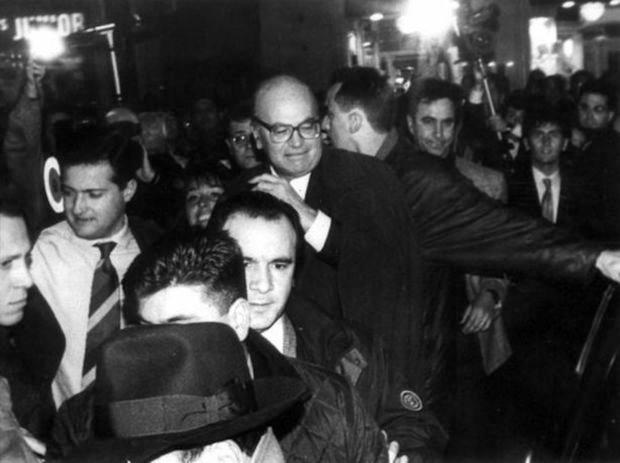
- Former prime minister Bettino Craxi greeted by a salvo of coins as a sign of loathing by protesters in Rome on 30 April 1993
- Country: Italy
- Started: 17 February 1992
- Magistrates: Antonio Di Pietro; Gherardo Colombo; Piercamillo Davigo

Mani pulite (Italian: [ˈmaːni puˈliːte]; lit. 'clean hands') was a nationwide judicial investigation into political corruption in Italy held in the early 1990s, resulting in the demise of the First Italian Republic and the disappearance of many political parties. In some accounts, as many as 5,000 public figures fell under suspicion. At one point, more than half of the members of the Italian Parliament were under indictment, while more than 400 city and town councils were dissolved because of corruption charges. The estimated value of bribes paid annually in the 1980s by Italian and foreign companies bidding for large government contracts reached US$4 billion (6.5 trillion lire). Some politicians and industry leaders committed suicide after their crimes were exposed. Antonio Di Pietro was the main judicial figure in charge of the investigation.

The corrupt system uncovered by the investigation was referred to as Tangentopoli (Italian pronunciation: [tandʒenˈtɔːpoli]). The term derives from Italian tangente, which means "kickback", and in this context refers to kickbacks given for public works contracts, and Greek polis meaning "city"; it is thus sometimes translated as "Bribesville" or "Kickback City". (Note: Since this scandal, the suffix -(o)poli is used as a generic suffix for a scandal (e.g. Calciopoli and Scommessopoli), much like -gate in the English language (i.e. Zippergate and Russiagate).) Former Italian prime minister Bettino Craxi became the main figure of the scandal and defended himself by saying that all parties did what he was accused of; Craxi, who fled to Hammamet, Tunisia, in 1994, was convicted twice for corruption and illicit financing to political parties and had four more trials pending by the time of his death in 2000. The Italian Communist Party (PCI) and some of its former members, mainly of its right wing, were also investigated but were acquitted.

The media impact and the climate of public indignation that followed were so great that they triggered the collapse of the then political system and the beginning of the Second Italian Republic, as historical parties, such as Christian Democracy (DC) and the Italian Socialist Party (PSI), dissolved, being replaced in Parliament in subsequent elections by newly formed parties, or those that had previously been in the minority or opposition, such as the Federation of the Greens (FdV) and Lega Nord (LN). Even without a formal change of regime, there was a profound change in the party system and a turnover of part of its national representatives. Eventually, all four parties in the 1992 government disappeared, at different times in different ways: the DC, the PSI, the Italian Democratic Socialist Party (PSDI), and the Italian Liberal Party (PLI). Conversely, the Democratic Party of the Left (PDS), the Italian Republican Party (PRI), and the Italian Social Movement (MSI) were the only surviving national parties; the PRI is the only one that maintained its name since.

== Arrest of Mario Chiesa ==
Tangentopoli, as the scandal came to be called, began on 17 February 1992 when Antonio Di Pietro, the magistrate who became most associated with the investigation, had Mario Chiesa, a member of the PSI, arrested for accepting a bribe from a Milan cleaning firm. The PSI distanced themselves from Chiesa, with party leader Bettino Craxi calling him mariuolo, or "villain", a "wild splinter" of an otherwise clean party. Upset over this treatment by his former colleagues, Chiesa began to give information about corruption implicating them. This marked the beginning of the Mani pulite investigation; news of political corruption began spreading in the Italian press. Tangentopoli itself refers to a series of judicial investigations conducted by various judicial prosecutors' offices, in particular that of Milan, which revealed a fraudulent or corrupt system that colluded with politics and Italian entrepreneurship.

== Extension of anti-corruption investigations ==
In the 1992 Italian general election, the DC held on to power when its coalition government kept a small majority, while leftist opposition parties gained support. The PCI split after the fall of the Soviet Union, depriving the opposition of leadership. Many votes went to the regionalist LN, which was not inclined to form alliances with other parties at the time. The resulting Parliament was therefore weak and difficult to bring to an agreement.

In April 1992, many industrial figures and politicians from both the government and the opposition were arrested on charges of corruption. While the investigations started in Milan, they quickly spread to other areas as more politicians confessed. Fundamental to this increased exposure was the general attitude of the main politicians to drop support for subordinates who got caught; this made many of them feel betrayed, and they often implicated many other figures, who in turn would implicate even more. On 2 September 1992, the PSI politician Sergio Moroni, who had been charged with corruption, killed himself, leaving behind a letter declaring that his crimes were not for his personal gain but for the party's benefit.

== Effect on national politics ==
In local elections in December 1992, held in eight comuni (municipalities), the DC lost half of their votes. The following day, Bettino Craxi was officially accused of corruption; he eventually resigned as leader of the PSI. On 5 March 1993, the government of Giuliano Amato (PSI) and his justice minister Giovanni Conso (independent) tried to find a solution with a decree, which allowed criminal charges for several bribery-related crimes to be replaced by administrative charges instead; according to popular opinion at the time, that would have resulted in a de facto amnesty for most corruption charges. Amid public outrage and nationwide rallies, the then Italian president Oscar Luigi Scalfaro (DC) refused to sign the decree, deeming it unconstitutional. The following week, a US$250 million scandal involving Eni, the government-controlled energy company, was revealed. The stream of accusations, confessions, and jailing continued.

On 25 March 1993, the Parliament changed municipal electoral law in favor of a majoritarian system. Later on 18 April 1993, the public overwhelmingly backed the abrogation of the existing proportional representation system in a referendum (mixed-member proportional representation was introduced that August), causing Amato to resign three days later. Still shocked by the recent events, the Parliament was unable to produce a new government. Carlo Azeglio Ciampi (independent), former governor of the Bank of Italy, was appointed head of the government; he appointed a technical government without political influences. Meanwhile, the Parliament blocked the investigation into Craxi, causing several cabinet ministers including Francesco Rutelli (FdV) and Vincenzo Visco (independent) to resign in protest after three days at their posts. In new local elections on 6 June 1993, the DC lost half of its votes once again; the PSI virtually disappeared. Instead, LN became the strongest political force in northern Italy.

== Cusani trial ==
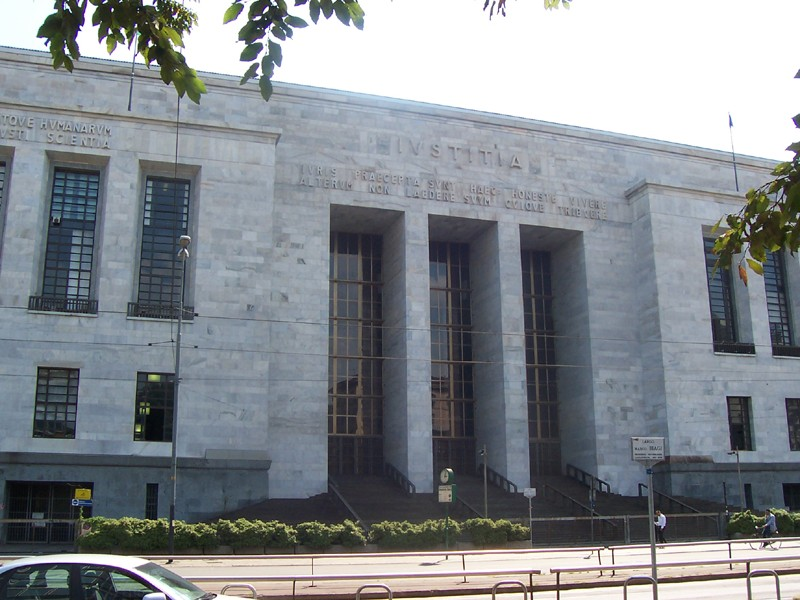
Milan's Palace of Justice, where the investigation began and the Cusani trial took place between 1993 and 1997

On 20 July 1993, the former Eni president Gabriele Cagliari committed suicide in jail. His wife later gave back US$3 million of illegal funds. Meanwhile, Sergio Cusani faced trial and was accused of crimes connected to Enimont, a joint venture between Eni and another energy company, Montedison. The trial was broadcast on national television and was a sort of showcase of the old politics being held accountable for their actions. While Cusani himself was not a major figure, the connection of his crimes to the Enimont affair called in all the nation's major politicians as witnesses.

A high note was reached in the Cusani trial when former head of government Arnaldo Forlani (DC), answering a question, simply said: "I don't remember." He happened to be very nervous and did not notice that perspiration was accumulating on his lips, and that image was by many considered symbolic of the people's disgust for the corrupt system. Instead, Craxi admitted that his party received $93 million of illegal funds, defending his actions by saying that "everyone was doing this". Even the LN was implicated in the trial; secretary Umberto Bossi and former treasurer Alessandro Patelli were convicted for receiving 200 million lire of illegal funding (approximately $100,000 at the time).

A bribe to the PCI was alleged but who had committed the offence was never established. A number of Milanese members of the PDS, mainly of the migliorista wing, were charged with corruption during their time as members of the PCI but were acquitted. Prosecutor Antonio Di Pietro stated: "Penal responsibility is personal, I cannot bring here a person with the first name Party and last name Communist." The Enimont trial itself was carried out after the Cusani trial, with much less public interest.

== Investigations on other fronts ==
In the meantime, the investigation expanded outside the political range. On 2 September 1993, the Milan judge Diego Curtò was arrested. On 21 April 1994, 80 financial regulators and 300 industry personalities were charged with corruption. A few days later, the secretary of Fiat admitted corruption with a letter to a newspaper. Media tycoon Silvio Berlusconi entered politics later that year and won the 1994 Italian general election in what many thought was a move to shield his many business concerns from possible scrutiny. This suspicion was reinforced on 11 February 1994, when his brother, Paolo Berlusconi, admitted to corruption crimes. On 29 July 1994, his brother was again arrested and immediately released.

== Lottizzazione ==
The term lottizzazione, meaning allotment in the way a terrain is divided up in minor parts or lotti, came to indicate the procedure of awarding top positions in important state conglomerates, such as IRI, Enel, or Eni to political figures, or at least managers with a clear political orientation. This usually trickled down to lower levels, creating power centres depending on political parties that controlled a significant part of the production system. The available seats were usually awarded so that government parties and opposition parties like the PCI would get a share of power corresponding to their perceived influence in the government.

== Impact ==
A 2020 study found that

local politicians withdraw support from incumbents in parties hit by Clean Hands – inducing early government dissolutions in such municipalities ... local politicians from the implicated parties exhibit lower re-running rates and higher rates of party switching in the short term. In the medium term, we find that corruption and voter turnout are lower in competitive municipalities 'treated' with a mayor from the implicated parties during Clean Hands. Moreover, medium-term upward career mobility of local politicians from the implicated parties benefited from party switching.

== In modern culture ==
In 2005, artist Gianni Motti created an artwork in the form of a bar of soap, named Mani pulite, based on the scandal. This piece was claimed to have been created out of the fat from a liposuction of Silvio Berlusconi. It was sold at the 36th edition of Art Basel for €15,000. A 2015 television series titled 1992 is based on the events of Mani pulite.

== See also ==
- Bancopoli
- List of -gate scandals and controversies
