= Alessandro Fabbri (screenwriter) =

Italian screenwriter and author (born 1978)

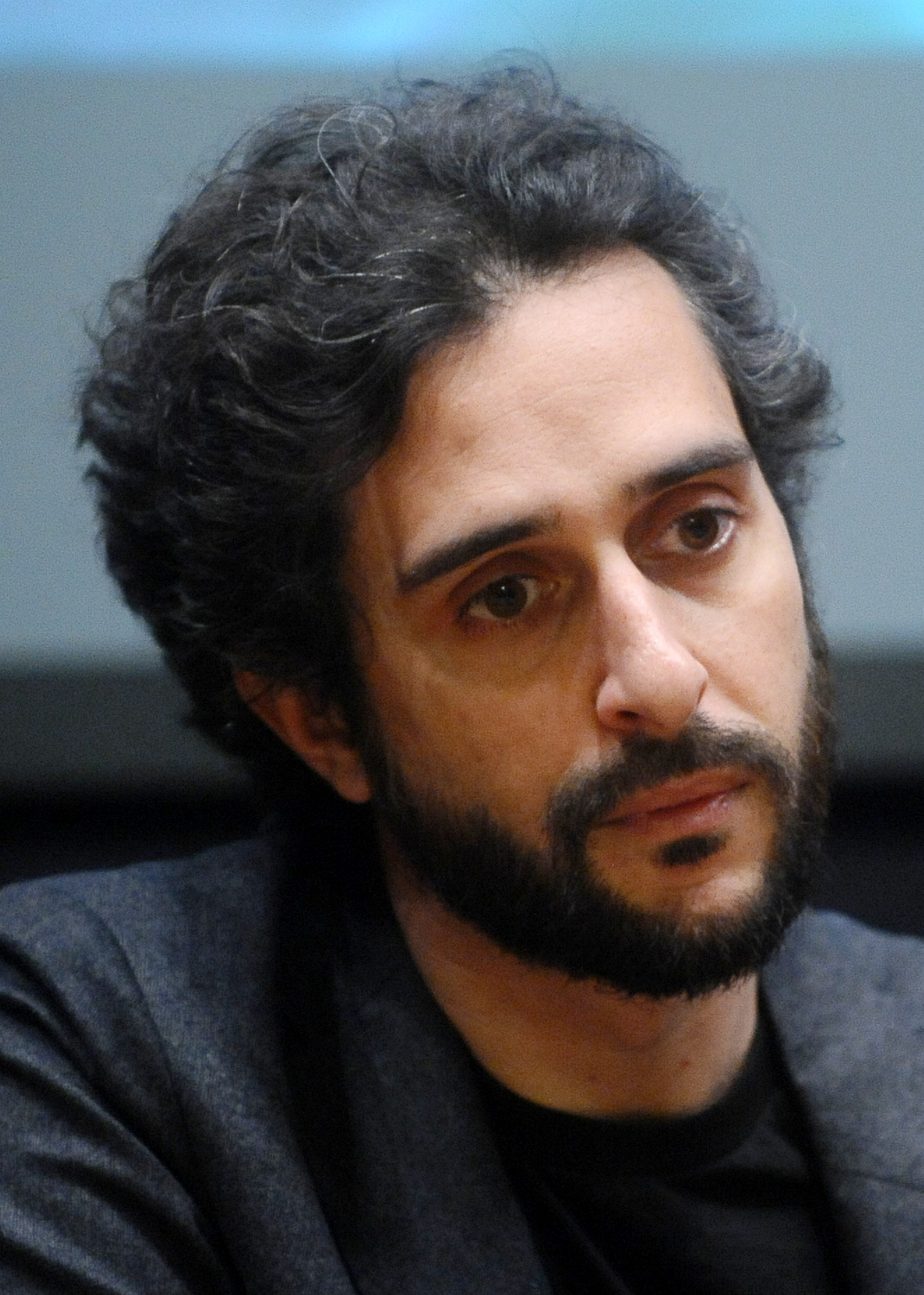
- Fabbri in 2015
- Born: 3 August 1978 (age 48); Ravenna, Italy
- Occupations: Screenwriter; author
- Years active: 1997–present

Alessandro Fabbri (Italian pronunciation: [a.lesˈsan.dro ˈfab.bri]; born 3 August 1978) is an Italian screenwriter and author.

== Biography ==
Fabbri was born in Ravenna. At the age of 18, he won the Premio Campiello Giovani for his short novel Mai fidarsi di un uomo che indossa un trench blu. His 2000 novel, Mosche a Hollywood, was adapted into a film, Hollywood Files, in 2005.

With Stefano Sardo and Ludovica Rampoldi, he co-wrote the films The Double Hour (2009) and The Invisible Boy (2014). They also created the television series 1992 (2015), 1993 (2017), and 1994 (2019). In 2024, he co-wrote the series Il re.

== Bibliography ==
- Mai fidarsi di un uomo che indossa un trench blu (1997)
- Mosche a Hollywood (2000)
- Quell'estate di sangue e di luna (2008) (Note: With Eraldo Baldini)
- Il re dell'ultima spiaggia (2010)
- Il ragazzo invisibile (2014) (Note: With Ludovica Rampoldi and Stefano Sardo)
- Il ragazzo invisibile - Seconda generazione (2018)

== Filmography ==
=== Film ===
- Hollywood Files (2005)
- The Double Hour (2009)
- The Invisible Boy (2014)
- The Invisible Boy: Second Generation (2018)

=== Television ===
Year	Title	Creator	Developer	Writer	Notes
2011	Distretto di Polizia	No	No	Yes	1 episode
2013	In Treatment	No	No	Yes	35 episodes
2015	Catturandi - Nel nome del padre	No	No	Yes	1 episode
2015	1992	Yes	No	Yes	10 episodes
2017	1993	Yes	No	Yes	8 episodes
2019	1994	Yes	No	Yes	8 episodes
2019	The Trial	Yes	No	Yes	8 episodes
2022	Devotion, a Story of Love and Desire	No	No	Yes	6 episodes
2024	Il re	No	No	Yes	1 episode
2024	Citadel: Diana	No	Yes	Yes	6 episodes
2025	Carême	No	No	Yes	1 episode
