= Gherardo Colombo =

Italian magistrate and judge

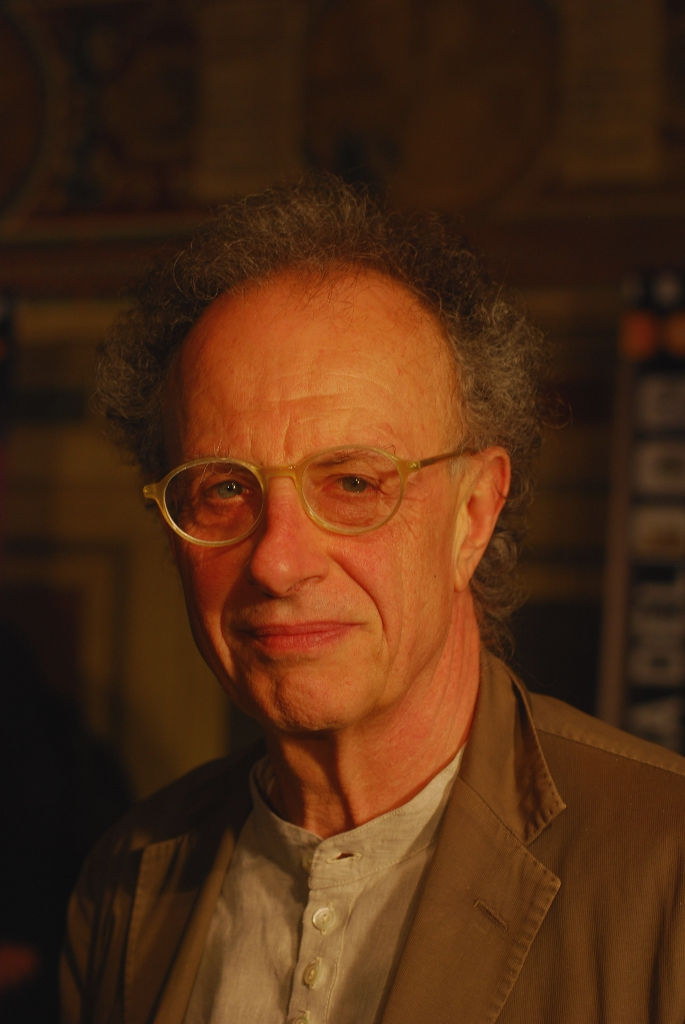
Gherardo Colombo in 2010

Gherardo Colombo (born 23 June 1946) is an Italian former magistrate and judge specialized in political corruption cases. He was a member of the Court of Cassation between 2005 and 2007.

== Career ==
Colombo was born on 23 June 1946 in Briosco. He obtained a degree in Jurisprudence from the Università Cattolica del Sacro Cuore in Milan in 1971.

Colombo had a 33-year-long career as a magistrate in Milan. He worked amongst others on the cases of the 1979 murder of advocate Giorgio Ambrosoli, the Propaganda Due Freemason lodge, and off-the-books money at the Istituto per la Ricostruzione Industriale. Together with Giuliano Turone he investigated the finances of Michele Sindona. In the 1990s Colombo was one of the judges in the Mani pulite political corruption investigation in Italy.

He resigned from the judiciary in 2007, even though he could have continued sitting as a judge for another fourteen years. As a reason for his resignation, he explained that he felt the fight against corruption should not take place solely in the legal arena.

== Books ==
- On rules, Amsterdam University Press, 2017, ISBN 978 94 6298 1942
