= Ilda Boccassini =

Italian magistrate (born 1949)

Ilda Boccassini (born 7 December 1949) is an Italian retired magistrate. She is sometimes known as "Ilda la rossa" (transl. Ilda the Redhead).

== Life and career ==
Boccassini was born in Naples on 7 December 1949. Boccassini obtained her law degree at the University of Naples Federico II in 1979, and she began working at the Brescia and Milan public prosecutor's offices the same year. Much of Boccassini's career involved the prosecution of organized crime in Italy, prominently working alongside Giovanni Falcone. Her first major case was the Duomo Connection investigation in which she and Falcone prosecuted Mafia connections in Northern Italy. When Falcone and fellow judge Paolo Borsellino were assassinated in the 1992 Capaci bombing, Boccassini requested a transfer to the region so that she could investigate the attack. She was appointed deputy public prosecutor at the Court of Milan in 2009. In this capacity, she was heavily involved in the proceedings during the 2011–2013 prostitution trial of then-incumbent Prime Minister Silvio Berlusconi. Boccassini retired in 2019. In 2021, Boccassini published a book about her career, La stanza numero 30 (transl. Room Number 30).
