= Antonio Di Pietro =

Italian politician and lawyer

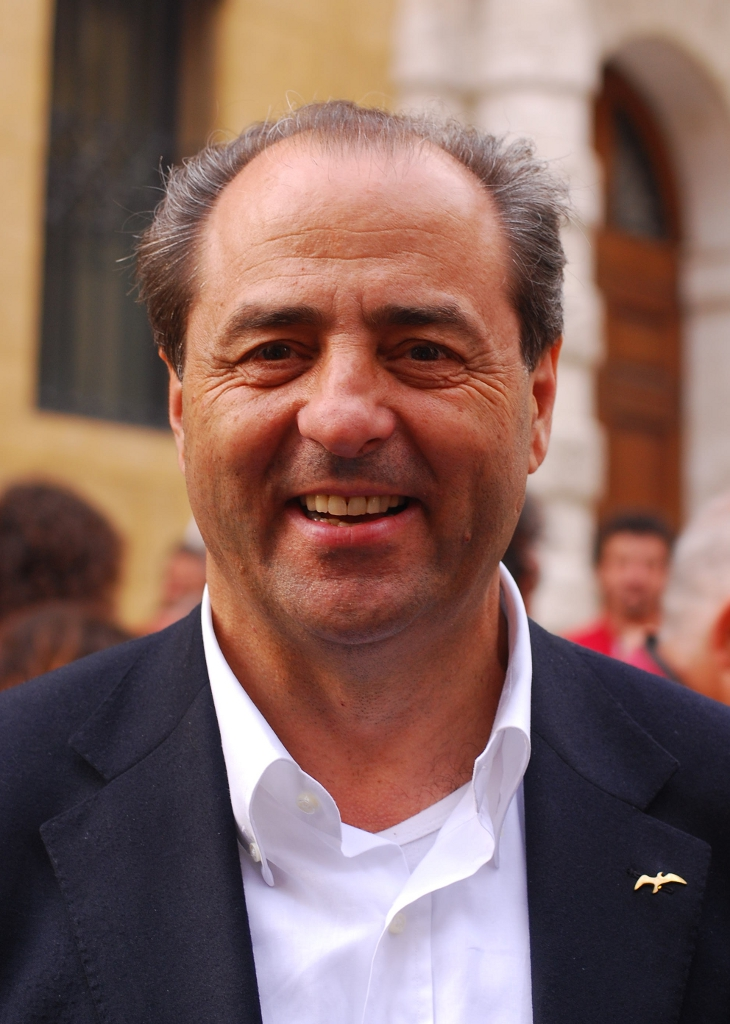

Minister of Infrastructure
- In office 17 May 2006 – 8 May 2008
- Prime Minister: Romano Prodi
- Deputy: Angelo Capodicasa
- Preceded by: Pietro Lunardi
- Succeeded by: Altero Matteoli

Minister of Public Works
- In office 17 May 1996 – 20 November 1996
- Prime Minister: Romano Prodi
- Deputy: Antonio Bargone; Gianni Francesco Mattioli
- Preceded by: Paolo Baratta
- Succeeded by: Paolo Costa

Member of the Chamber of Deputies
- In office 28 April 2006 – 14 March 2013

Member of the European Parliament
- In office 20 July 1999 – 27 April 2006

Member of the Senate
- In office 18 November 1997 – 29 May 2001

Personal details
- Born: 2 October 1950 (age 75) Montenero di Bisaccia, Italy
- Party: Independent (since 2014)
- Other political affiliations: Italy of Values (1998; 2001–2014); The Democrats (1999–2001)
- Children: Cristiano, Antonio Giuseppe and Anna
- Education: University of Milan
- Profession: Politician, lawyer, magistrate

Antonio Di Pietro (Italian pronunciation: [anˈtɔːnjo di ˈpjɛːtro]; born 2 October 1950) is an Italian politician, lawyer and magistrate. He was a minister in government of Romano Prodi, a Senator, and a Member of the European Parliament. He was a prosecutor in the Mani pulite corruption trials in the early 1990s.

== Prosecutor ==
Di Pietro was born in Montenero di Bisaccia, a comune in the province of Campobasso, in the Southern Italian region of Molise, to a poor rural family. As a young man he travelled to Germany, in the city of Böhmenkirch (Baden-Württemberg), where he worked in a factory in the mornings and in a sawmill in the afternoons to pay for his studies. He graduated from night school in Italy with a degree in law in 1978 and became a police officer. After a few years, he started a judicial career as a prosecutor.

=== Mani pulite ===
In February 1992, Di Pietro began investigating Milan's politicians and business leaders for corruption and kickbacks. Together with other well-known magistrates such as Francesco Saverio Borrelli, Ilda Boccassini, Gherardo Colombo, and Piercamillo Davigo, he worked on the Mani pulite ("Clean Hands") team, which investigated political corruption. As part of this team, he investigated hundreds of local and national politicians, all the way up to the most important national political figures, including Bettino Craxi. The Italian press named the investigation "Tangentopoli" ("Bribesville").

He soon became the most popular of the Mani pulite judges due to his peculiar way of speaking, characterised by a pronounced Molisan accent and frequent use of vernacular expressions, and his resolute and straightforward attitude. However, Di Pietro was accused by Craxi of having provoked a "false Revolution", and of investigating only some politicians, ignoring the opposition parties. Only in 2012, Di Pietro admitted that Craxi was right when during the Enimont trial he accused the Italian Communist Party of having received illegal funding from the Soviet Union. Craxi's sentences seemed to him "criminally relevant", but Di Pietro omitted to investigate that crime.

When the Tangentopoli investigation focused on Prime Minister Silvio Berlusconi, Di Pietro became the focus of a slander campaign and strong political pressure, leading him to resign from the judiciary.

=== Use of technology ===
Di Pietro was also known for being one of the first Italian prosecutors to use digital technologies in his work, using computers and visual presentations, which raised some protests (for example, by lawyer Guido Spazzali). Di Pietro soon became interested in information technology (IT), and used it actively in his work. Instead of studying the classics—the usual high-school education for lawyers in Italy—he had trained to become an electronics technician (though he has never taken a computer course). He still maintains an interest in IT, with his blog and YouTube conferences.

Once he uttered a famous sentence to describe his own behaviour: "As a bricklayer I tried to build my walls straight, as a policeman I tried to arrest criminals, and as a judge I tried to bring people to trial when there was good reason to do so".

== Minister ==
After the Mani pulite investigations resulted in the disbandment of the previous ruling parties (first of all, Christian Democracy), Di Pietro was called into Romano Prodi's new governing team as minister for Public Works, with responsibility for the areas most affected by bribery—all the initiatives financed by the state. Here he tried to impose a controversial project which would have doubled the main national motorway between Bologna and Florence. It provoked violent opposition by inhabitants of the interested areas. Ecologists, who had supported Prodi's coalition, protested the plan, which would have destroyed Apennine valleys and woods.

Romano Prodi had previously been the subject of an investigation run by Di Pietro, but the charges had been dropped before any trial.

Di Pietro came under investigation himself in 1997 for his activities both in the police and as a judge. It was later found that the main prosecutor handling Di Pietro's case, Fabio Salamone from Brescia, was the brother of a man that Di Pietro himself had prosecuted, and who had been sentenced to 18 months of jail for various corruption charges. Di Pietro was accused of corruption for receiving money from banker Pierfrancesco Pacini Battaglia in exchange of favours. Although it took some time for the authorities to realize this, Salamone was eventually allocated other duties and, after years of trials, Di Pietro was eventually cleared of all charges.

== Political career ==
After being cleared, Di Pietro started a political career, something he had previously excluded on the grounds that he did not want to exploit the popularity he had gained while doing what he perceived to be just his duty. He was elected to the Italian Senate in a by-election caused by the resignation of a senator, and defeated right-wing journalist Giuliano Ferrara in the Mugello constituency, a left wing stronghold.

He later founded his own movement, Italy of Values (Italia dei Valori), making its main theme the fight against political corruption in Italy. As a protest against the growing tolerance of corruption in most Italian political parties, and the complacent attitude of left-wing politicians like Massimo D'Alema towards Berlusconi, he did not run alongside the left-wing coalition in the Italian general election of 2001, which was won by Silvio Berlusconi's coalition.

Di Pietro's movement collected just short of the nationwide four-percent limit necessary for entry to the Lower Chamber of the Parliament under proportional representation, and gained a single senator—who immediately defected to Berlusconi's party.

Running alongside the former leader of the Italian Communist Party and founder of the Democratic Party of the Left, Achille Occhetto, he received two seats in the European Elections of 2004. The other seat is currently taken by Giulietto Chiesa, a journalist.

Di Pietro was one of seven candidates for leader of the left-wing coalition The Union for the general election held on 16 October 2005 — eventually won by Romano Prodi — in which he obtained 3.3 percent of the votes, ranking fourth.

On 17 May 2006 Di Pietro was appointed Minister of Infrastructures by Romano Prodi, as part of his new government.

He was a member of the Bureau of the Alliance of Liberals and Democrats for Europe and sit on the European Parliament's Committee on Legal Affairs. He was also a substitute for the Committee on Civil Liberties, Justice and Home Affairs and chaired the Delegation for relations with South Africa.

On 30 January 2006 he published a letter in the Italian newspaper l'Unità, in which he promised to work for a law that will prohibit anyone from being elected more than twice consecutively (although he has been an MP since 1996), and prohibiting anyone who has received a definitive sentence from becoming a candidate in elections.

In September 2010, Di Pietro harshly criticized Berlusconi and the parliament for approving a controversial tax amnesty bill.

In late October 2012 Antonio Di Pietro came under examination in an inquiry by the Italian national television program "Report" who questioned the alleged spending of IDV funds for personal use. Di Pietro has denied wrongdoing.

In 2013 he was found guilty of defamation of Totò Cuffaro by the tribunal of Palermo.

At the end of 2014, he left Italy of Values and became an independent.

== Vidcast ==
In December 2006, Di Pietro started a vidcast on YouTube. In the vidcast, issued weekly from January 2007, Di Pietro talked about the issues discussed in the weekly Government Cabinet. Other prominent politicians, such as Angela Merkel of Germany, had released one-off vidcasts, but this was perhaps the first time that a minister of a government in office had a regular vidcast.

== Career ==
- 1978: Graduate in law
- 1978–1979: specialisation in administrative law
- 1980: qualification for court work
- 1981: magistrate
- 1996: Minister of Public Works in the 12th legislature
- 1997: Senator
- since 1998: Chairman of the 'Italia dei Valori' party
- since 1999: Member of the European Parliament
- 1999–2002: Chairman of the Delegation for relations with South America and Mercosur
- 2002–2004: Chairman of the Delegation for relations with Central Asia—Kazakhstan, Kyrgyzstan, Uzbekistan, Tajikistan, Turkmenistan, and Mongolia
- Honorary degree from the University of Thrace (Greece)
