= Thou Shalt Not Kill (TV series) =

Italian television series

- Italian logo for Season 1
- Non uccidere
- Genre: Crime drama
- Created by: Claudio Corbucci
- Starring: Miriam Leone; Matteo Martari; Thomas Trabacchi; Riccardo Lombardo; Luca Terraciano; Monica Guerritore; Davide Iacopini
- Composers: Corrado Carosio; Pierangelo Fornaro
- Country of origin: Italy

Original release
- Network: Rai 3 RaiPlay
- Release: September 11, 2015 – December 21, 2018

Thou Shalt Not Kill (Italian: Non uccidere) is an Italian crime drama television series starring Miriam Leone. The first season aired in Italy on Rai 3 in 2017, while the second season premiered on Rai's streaming service RaiPlay. Each season consists of 12 episodes. In the U.S. and U.K., the series is available on Walter Presents. This series aired on American PBS stations in fall 2019, and again in 2021.

== Synopsis ==
Thou Shalt Not Kill is an Italian detective drama set in Turin. The series follows Valeria Ferro, who investigates murders with the help of her colleagues in the police department, while also uncovering secrets from her own family's past. Valeria's mother was imprisoned for killing her husband when Valeria was a child.

The show also explores Valeria's complex relationships with her family and colleagues, which often intersect, especially since her mother was arrested by the same police department in which Valeria works.

== Cast ==
- Miriam Leone as Valeria Ferro
- Monica Guerritore as Lucia Ferro
- Matteo Martari as Andrea Russo
- Thomas Trabacchi as Giorgio Lombardi
- Riccardo Lombardo as Gerardo Mattei
- Luca Terracciano as Luca Rinaldi
- Davide Iacopini as Giacomo Ferro
- Viola Sartoretto as Michela Ferro
- Gigio Alberti as Giulio Ferro
- Crystal De Glaudi as Costanza Ferro

== Broadcast ==
This was first broadcast on Rai 3 in Italy for seasons one and two, with each season containing 12 episodes, starting in 2017. Season two premiered on Rai's streaming service RaiPlay. In the U.S. and U.K., the series is available on Walter Presents. The show debuted on American PBS stations in the fall of 2019, airing in Italian with English subtitles.
