= Pellegrini (surname) =

Pellegrini (Italian: [pelleˈɡriːni]) is an Italian surname.

== Geographical distribution ==
As of 2014, 65.8% of all known bearers of the surname Pellegrini were residents of Italy (frequency 1:1,381), 10.1% of Argentina (1:6,286), 8.5% of Brazil (1:35,648), 8.4% of the United States (1:64,188) and 1.8% of Switzerland (1:6,918).

In Italy, the frequency of the surname was higher than national average (1:1,381) in the following regions:

1. Tuscany (1:346)
2. Trentino-Alto Adige/Südtirol (1:615)
3. Umbria (1:674)
4. Lazio (1:820)
5. Marche (1:880)
6. Lombardy (1:1,096)
7. Friuli-Venezia Giulia (1:1,296)
8. Abruzzo (1:1,353)

== People ==
- Ada Pellegrini Grinover, Brazilian lawyer
- Alain Pellegrini, French general
- Alberto Pellegrini, former Italian paralympic fencer
- Aldo Pellegrini (general), Italian general
- Aldo Pellegrini (poet), Argentine poet, essayist and art critic
- Alfred Heinrich Pellegrini, Swiss muralist
- Amalia Pellegrini, Italian actress
- Angelo Pellegrini, Italian-American food writer
- Ann Pellegrini, American professor
- Antonio Snider-Pellegrini, French geographer
- Armando Pellegrini, Italian racing cyclist
- Bob Pellegrini, American football player
- Carlo Pellegrini (disambiguation), several people
- Carlos Alberto Pellegrini, Argentine-American surgeon
- Carlos Pellegrini, Argentine 19th-century politician; president of the country from 1890 to 1892
- Charles Pellegrini, Argentine painter
- Claudio Pellegrini, Italian physicist
- Dan Pellegrini, American politician
- Daniella Pellegrini, South African TV presenter
- Diego Pellegrini, Italian footballer
- Domenico Pellegrini (painter), Italian painter
- Ernesto Pellegrini, Italian catering businessman and football executive
- Federica Pellegrini, Italian swimmer
- Georgia Pellegrini, American author
- Giacomo Pellegrini, Roman Catholic prelate
- Gino Pellegrini, Italian set designer and painter
- Gino Pellegrini (musician), Italian American mandolinist and composer
- Giovanni Antonio Pellegrini, Italian painter
- Giovanni Angelo Pellegrini, Roman Catholic prelate
- Glauco Pellegrini, Italian screenwriter
- Graziella Pellegrini, Italian stem cell biologist
- Guillermo Pellegrini, Argentine equestrian
- Héctor Pellegrini, Argentine film actor
- Ida Einaudi (1885–1968) born Countess Ida Pellegrini, First Lady of Italy (May 12, 1948 – May 11, 1955)
- Ines Pellegrini, Italian actress
- Jacopo Pellegrini, Italian professional footballer
- Joe Pellegrini, American football player
- Jorge Pellegrini, Argentine footballer
- Lorenzo Pellegrini, Italian footballer
- Luca Pellegrini (disambiguation), several people
- Lucas Pellegrini, French footballer
- Lucio Pellegrini, Italian director
- Luigi Pellegrini Scaramuccia, Italian painter
- Manuel Pellegrini, Chilean football manager and former player
- Marco Pellegrini, Dominican friar
- Marco Pellegrini (politician), Italian politician
- Massimo Pellegrini, Italian footballer
- Margaret Pellegrini, American actress
- Maria Pellegrini, Canadian operatic soprano
- Matías Pellegrini, Argentine footballer
- Maurizio Pellegrini, Italian painter
- Nicola Pellegrini, Italian artist
- Nicolino Pellegrini, Italian musician
- Norman Pellegrini, American radio executive
- Paolo Pellegrini, Roman Catholic prelate
- Peter Pellegrini, Slovak president
- Robert Pellegrini, American psychologist
- Riccardo Pellegrini, Italian painter
- Sara Pellegrini, Italian cross-country skier
- Stefano Pellegrini (footballer, born 1953), Italian footballer
- Stefano Pellegrini (footballer, born 1967), Italian footballer
- Thalia Pellegrini, British TV presenter
- Tassilo Pellegrini, professor at the University of St.Pölten, Austria
- Tobias Pellegrini, Austrian footballer
- Valeriano Pellegrini, Italian soprano castrato
- Vincenzo Pellegrini, Italian painter
- Walter Pellegrini, Swiss footballer

== See also ==
- Eddie Pellagrini, American baseball player and coach
- Pellegrini (disambiguation)
