= 1982–83 Inter Milan season =

Inter Milan
1982–83 season
- President: Ivanoe Fraizzoli
- Manager: Rino Marchesi
- Stadium: Giuseppe Meazza
- Serie A: 3rd (in UEFA Cup)
- Coppa Italia: Semifinals
- UEFA Cup Winners' Cup: Quarterfinals
- Top goalscorer: League: Altobelli (15); All: Altobelli (22)
- Highest home attendance: 77,392 vs. Juventus (19 December 1982)
- Lowest home attendance: 28,360 vs. Catanzaro (9 January 1983)
- Average home league attendance: 45,134
Home colours	Away colours

During the 1982–83 season Inter Milan competed in Serie A, Coppa Italia and UEFA Cup Winners' Cup.

== Summary ==
During the summer in his 14th campaign as chairman, Fraizzoli appointed a new manager Rino Marchesi replacing Bersellini after 5 seasons with the club. The defensive line of the team was reinforced with defender Fulvio Collovati a 1982 FIFA World Cup champion player in exchange with AC Milan for three players Pasinato, Canuti and Serena. Also, the President transferred out Prohaska to Roma. The club discarded the transfer in of Platini despite a pre-agreement signed with the French midfielder in February 1978 then, he was transferred in by Juventus, instead Inter chose to buy Hansi Müller from VfB Stuttgart and Juary from Avellino. During the campaign future club legend Zenga arrived to the squad, along with Massimo Pellegrini who made his debut on 12 December 1982, being the second youngest player ever lining-up in field for Inter after Edgardo Rebosio.

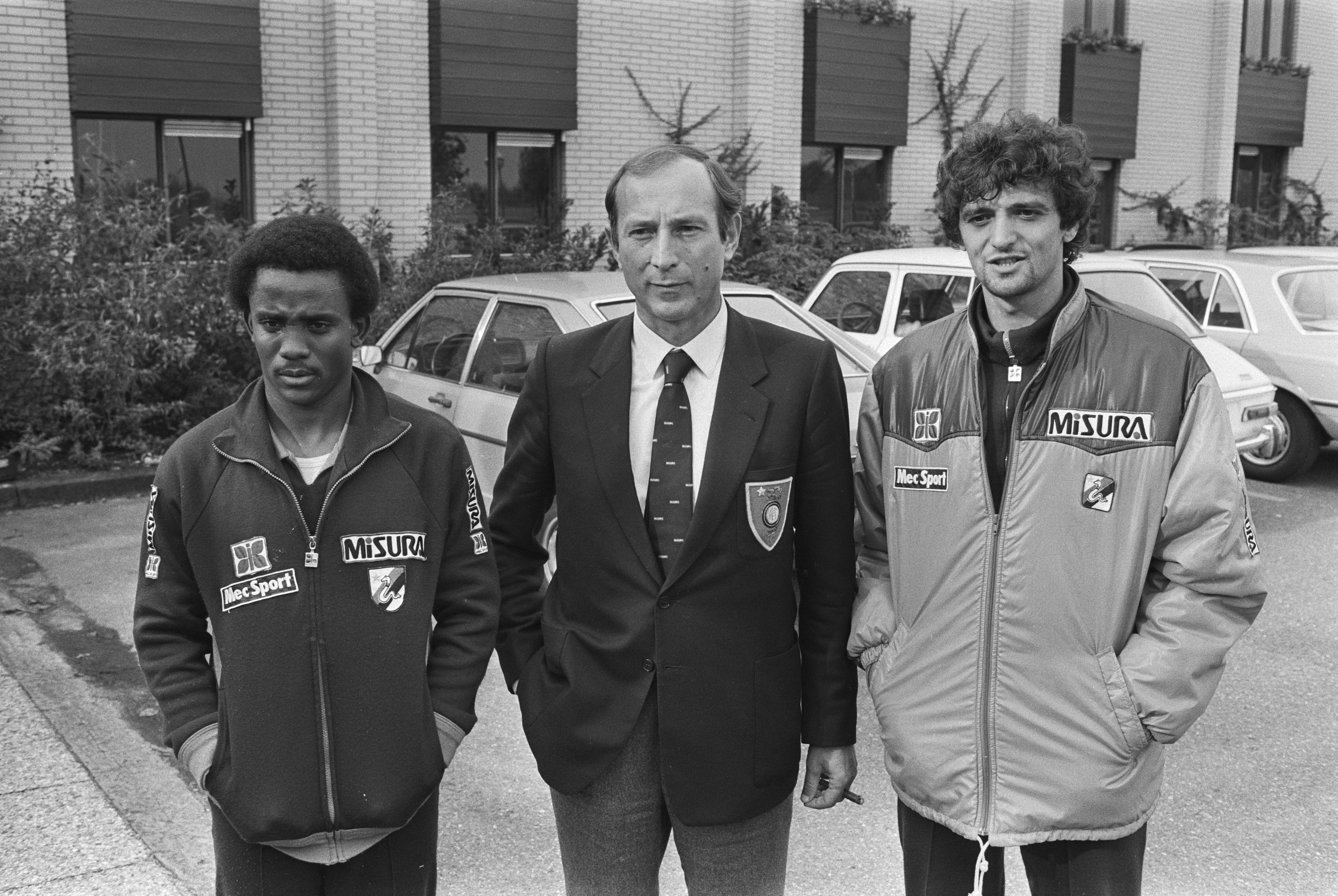
Newly arrived Brazilian Forward Juary, along manager Rino Marchesi (left) and Altobelli (right).

The team advanced to the UEFA Cup Winner's Cup quarterfinals stage only to be defeated by Real Madrid. Meanwhile, in the league, the squad finishes in third position several points behind Roma and Juventus. Also, in Coppa the club was eliminated in the semifinals by Juventus.

== Squad ==
Note: Flags indicate national team as defined under FIFA eligibility rules; some limited exceptions apply. Players may hold more than one non-FIFA nationality.

Pos.	Nation	Player
GK	ITA	Ivano Bordon
GK	ITA	Walter Zenga
DF	ITA	Giuseppe Baresi
DF	ITA	Giuseppe Bergomi
DF	ITA	Graziano Bini
DF	ITA	Fulvio Collovati
DF	ITA	Walter Dondoni
DF	ITA	Riccardo Ferri
MF	ITA	Salvatore Bagni
MF	ITA	Evaristo Beccalossi

Pos.	Nation	Player
MF	ITA	Roberto Bergamaschi
MF	ITA	Daniele Bernazzani
MF	ITA	Gianpiero Marini
MF	FRG	Hansi Müller
MF	ITA	Gabriele Oriali
MF	ITA	Giancarlo Pasinato
MF	ITA	Massimo Pellegrini
MF	ITA	Antonio Sabato
FW	ITA	Alessandro Altobelli
FW	BRA	Juary

=== Transfers ===
In
Pos.	Name	from	Type
GK	Walter Zenga	Sambenedettese	loan ended
MF	Hansi Muller	VfB Stuttgart	
DF	Fulvio Collovati	Milan	co-ownership
MF	Roberto Bergamaschi	Pisa	loan ended
MF	Antonio Sabato	Catanzaro	
FW	Juary	Avellino	
FW	Carlo Muraro	Udinese	

Out
Pos.	Name	to	Type
MF	Herbert Prohaska	Roma	
GK	Angelo Pizzetti	Modena	
DF	Klaus Bachlechner	Bologna	
DF	Nazzareno Canuti	Milan	co-ownership
MF	Claudio Lombardo	Vogherese	co-ownership
MF	Giancarlo Pasinato	Milan	co-ownership
MF	Luigi Rocca	Siena	loan ended
MF	Giancarlo Centi	Avellino	
FW	Claudio Fermanelli	Como	
FW	Aldo Serena	Milan	co-ownership

== Competitions ==
=== Serie A ===
==== League table ====
Pos	Team	Pld	W	D	L	GF	GA	GD	Pts	Qualification or relegation
1	Roma (C)	30	16	11	3	47	24	+23	43	Qualification to European Cup
2	Juventus	30	15	9	6	49	26	+23	39	Qualification to Cup Winners' Cup
3	Internazionale	30	12	14	4	40	23	+17	38	Qualification to UEFA Cup
4	Hellas Verona	30	11	13	6	37	31	+6	35	Qualification to UEFA Cup
5	Fiorentina	30	12	10	8	36	25	+11	34	

Source: Panini
Rules for classification: 1) points; 2) Head-to-head points; 3) goal difference; 4) number of goals scored.
(C) Champions

==== Results by round ====
Round	1	2	3	4	5	6	7	8	9	10	11	12	13	14	15	16	17	18	19	20	21	22	23	24	25	26	27	28	29	30
Ground	H	A	H	A	H	A	H	A	H	A	A	H	H	A	H	A	H	A	H	A	H	A	H	A	H	H	A	A	H	A
Result	W	L	W	D	D	D	D	W	D	W	W	L	D	D	W	D	D	W	D	L	D	L	D	W	W	W	D	W	D	W
Position	1	6	2	4	4	5	5	3	4	4	2	4	4	4	3	3	3	3	3	3	4	4	4	4	3	3	3	2	3	3

Source: Competitive matches
A = Away; H = Home; W = Win; D = Draw; L = Loss; P = Postponed; = Leader, 1981–82 European Cup; = 1981–82 UEFA Cup; = 1981-82 Serie B; R = 1981-82 UEFA Cup Winners' Cup

==== Matches ====
12 September 1982 1	Hellas Verona	1–2	Inter Milan	Verona
	Volpati 35'	Report	19' Altobelli; 22' Müller	Stadium: Stadio Marcantonio Bentegodi; Referee: Carlo Longhi

19 September 1982 2	Inter Milan	1–2	Sampdoria	Milan
	Müller 34'	Report	11' Francis; 56' Mancini	Stadium: Giuseppe Meazza; Referee: Lo Bello

26 September 1982 3	Cagliari	0–2	Inter Milan	Cagliari
		Report	44' Altobelli; 60' (o.g.) Loi	Stadium: Stadio Sant'Elia; Referee: Pairetto

3 October 1982 4	Inter Milan	0–0	Fiorentina	Milan
		Report		Stadium: Giuseppe Meazza; Referee: Agnolin

10 October 1982 5	Torino	0–0	Inter Milan	Turin
		Report		Stadium: Comunale; Referee: Bergamo

17 October 1982 6	Inter Milan	2–2	Napoli	Milan
	Oriali 56'; Altobelli 67' (pen.)	Report	86' Criscimanni; 90' Marino	Stadium: Giuseppe Meazza; Referee: Barbaresco

24 October 1982 7	Pisa	1–1	Inter Milan	Pisa
	Berggreen 69'	Report	82' Bagni	Stadium: Arena Garibaldi; Referee: Pieri

31 October 1982 8	Inter Milan	2–0	Ascoli	Milan
	Scorsa 5' (o.g.); Beccalossi 63'	Report		Stadium: Giuseppe Meazza; Referee: Carlo Longhi

7 November 1982 9	Cesena	2–2	Inter Milan	Cesena
	Garlini 12'; Piraccini 38'	Report	3' Bergamaschi; 86' Bini	Stadium: La Fiorita; Referee: Egidio Ballerini

21 November 1982 10	Inter Milan	2–1	Genoa CFC	Milan
	Altobelli 6'; Bergamaschi 88'	Report	84' Faccenda	Stadium: Giuseppe Meazza; Referee: Maurizio Mattei

28 November 1982 11	Avellino	1–2	Inter Milan	Avellino
	Vignola 75'	Report	71' Marini; 87' Altobelli	Stadium: Partenio; Referee: Menicucci

12 December 1982 12	AS Roma	2–1	Inter Milan	Rome
	Falcão 34'; Iorio 67'	Report 1 Report 2	89' Altobelli	Stadium: Olimpico; Referee: Bergamo

19 December 1982 13	Inter Milan	0–0	Juventus	Milan
		Report		Stadium: Giuseppe Meazza; Referee: Longhi

2 January 1983 14	Udinese	0–0	Inter Milan	Udine
		Report		Stadium: Friuli; Referee: Claudio Pieri

9 January 1983 15	Inter Milan	5–0	Catanzaro	Milan
	Bagni 34'; Altobelli 37'; Müller 49'; Oriali 53'; Juary 87'	Report		Stadium: Giuseppe Meazza; Referee: Pairetto

16 January 1983 16	Inter Milan	1–1	Hellas Verona	Milan
	Bergomi 80'	Report	9' Guidetti	Stadium: Giuseppe Meazza; Referee: D'Elia

23 January 1983 17	Sampdoria	0–0	Inter Milan	Genoa
		Report		Stadium: Luig Ferraris; Referee: Enzo Barbaresco

30 January 1983 18	Inter Milan	2–0	Cagliari	Milan
	Bogoni 9' (o.g.); Altobelli 81'	Report		Stadium: Giuseppe Meazza; Referee: Romeo Paparesta

6 February 1983 19	Fiorentina	0–0	Inter Milan	Florence
		Report		Stadium: Comunale; Referee: Pieri

20 February 1983 20	Inter Milan	1–3	Torino	Milan
	Altobelli 90' (pen.)	Report	28' Borghi; 71' Selvaggi; 89' Torrisi	Stadium: Giuseppe Meazza; Referee: Paolo Bergamo

27 February 1983 21	Napoli	1–1	Inter Milan	Naples
	Dal Fiume 87'	Report	10' Altobelli	Stadium: San Paolo; Referee: Giancarlo Redini

6 March 1983 22	Inter Milan	0–1	Pisa	Milan
		Report	72' (o.g.) Marini	Stadium: Giuseppe Meazza; Referee: Luigi Agnolin

13 March 1983 23	Ascoli	0–0	Inter Milan	Ascoli Piceno
		Report		Stadium: Cino e Lillo Del Duca; Referee: Gino Menicucci

20 March 1983 24	Inter Milan	3–1	Cesena	Milan
	Altobelli 35' (pen.), 55', 85'	Report	9' Schachner	Stadium: Giuseppe Meazza; Referee: Carlo Longhi

27 March 1983 25	Genoa CFC	2–3	Inter Milan	Genoa
	Briaschi 48'; Iachini 75' (pen.)	Report	14' Altobelli; 56' Bini; 85' Bagni	Stadium: Luigi Ferraris; Referee: Pairetto

10 April 1983 26	Inter Milan	2–0	Avellino	Milan
	Bagni 49', 89'	Report		Stadium: Giuseppe Meazza; Referee: Lanese

24 April 1983 27	Inter Milan	0–0	AS Roma	Milan
		Report 1 Report 2		Stadium: Giuseppe Meazza; Referee: Bergamo

1 May 1983 28	Juventus	0–2	Inter Milan	Turin
	Platini 44', 69'; Bettega 77'		27' Altobelli; 37' Oriali; 55' Müller	Stadium: Comunale; Referee: Barbaresco (Cormons)
Note: Italian Court awarded Match to Inter Milan (0–2)

8 May 1983 29	Inter Milan	1–1	Udinese	Milan
	Juary 53'	Report	3' Gerolin	Stadium: Giuseppe Meazza; Referee: Pieri

15 May 1983 30	Catanzaro	1–2	Inter Milan	Catanzaro
	Marini 16' (o.g.)	Report	34' Altobelli; 68' Müller	Stadium: Stadio Militare; Referee: Menicucci

=== Coppa Italia ===
==== First round-Group 8 ====
Group 8
Pos	Team	Pld	W	D	L	GF	GA	GD	Pts
1	Bari	5	4	1	0	9	3	+6	9
2	Internazionale	5	4	0	1	9	3	+6	8
3	Udinese	5	3	0	2	7	5	+2	6
4	Vicenza	5	1	2	2	11	8	+3	4
5	Rimini	5	0	2	3	5	9	−4	2
6	Foggia	5	0	1	4	4	17	−13	1

===== Matches =====
18 August 1982 1	Rimini	0–1	Inter Milan	Rimini
			89' Müller	Stadium: Romeo Neri; Referee: Carlo Longhi

22 August 1982 2	Lanerossi	1–3	Inter Milan	Vicenza
	Donà 40'		15', 87' Altobelli; 67' Bini	Stadium: Romeo Menti; Referee: Maurizio Mattei

29 August 1982 3	Inter Milan	0–1	A.S. Bari	Bergamo
			33' Baldini	Stadium: Comunale; Referee: Egidio Ballerini

1 September 1982 4	Inter Milan	3–0	Foggia	Como
	Altobelli 3'; Juary 54'; Beccalossi 89' (pen.)			Stadium: Giuseppe Sinigaglia; Referee: Claudio Pieri

5 September 1982 5	Udinese	1–2	Inter Milan	Udine
	De Giorgis 75'		68' Bergomi; 86' Beccalossi	Stadium: Friuli; Referee: Paolo Bergamo

==== Eightfinals ====
16 February 1983	Inter Milan	2–0	Varese	Milan
	Misuri 20' (o.g.); Oriali 68'			Stadium: Giuseppe Meazza; Referee: Lanese

5 April 1983	Varese	1–0	Inter Milan	Varese
	Di Giovanni 73'			Stadium: Franco Ossola; Referee: Pezzella

==== Quarterfinals ====
18 May 1983	Inter Milan	3–2	Pisa	Milan
	Collovati 1'; Altobelli 23'; Müller 60' (pen.)		85' Garuti; 86' Berggreen	Stadium: Giuseppe Meazza; Referee: Pairetto

4 June 1983	Pisa	0–0	Inter Milan	Pisa
				Stadium: Arena Garibaldi; Referee: Agnolin

==== Semifinals ====
11 June 1983	Juventus	2–1	Inter Milan	Turin
	G. Baresi 5' (o.g.); Galderisi 8'		63' Bini	Stadium: Comunale; Referee: Menegali

15 June 1983	Inter Milan	0–0	Juventus	Milan
				Stadium: Giuseppe Meazza; Referee: Pieri

=== UEFA Cup Winners' Cup ===
==== Round of 32 ====
15 September 1982	Inter (Italy)	2–0	(Czechoslovakia) Slovan Bratislava	Milan
	Altobelli 78'; Sabato 83'			Stadium: Giuseppe Meazza; Referee: (Portugal) Graça Oliva

29 September 1982	Slovan Bratislava (Czechoslovakia)	2–1	(Italy) Inter	Bratislava
	Takac 25'; Bobek 78'		5' (pen.) Müller	Stadium: Tehelné pole Referee: (France) Konrath

==== Eightfinals ====
20 October 1982	AZ Alkmaar (Netherlands)	1–0	(Italy) Inter	Alkmaar
	Tiktak 5'			Stadium: Alkmaarderhot Stadion; Referee: (East Germany) Prokop

3 November 1982	Inter (Italy)	2–0	(Netherlands) AZ Alkmaar	Milan
	Juary 3'; Altobelli 67'			Stadium: Giuseppe Meazza; Referee: (Poland) Jarguz

==== Quarterfinals ====
2 March 1983	Inter (Italy)	1–1	(Spain) Real Madrid	Milan
	Oriali 16'		59' Gallego	Stadium: Giuseppe Meazza; Referee: (Turkey) Tokat

16 March 1983	Real Madrid (Spain)	2–1	(Italy) Inter	Madrid
	Salguero 51'; Santillana 55'		20' Altobelli	Stadium: Santiago Bernabeu; Referee: (Czechoslovakia) Christov

== Statistics ==
=== Squad statistics ===
Competition	Points	Home						Away						Total						GD
Competition	Points	G	V	N	P	Gs	Ga	G	V	N	P	Gs	Ga	G	V	N	P	Gs	Ga	GD
1982-83 Serie A	38	15	6	6	3	22	12	15	6	8	1	18	11	30	12	14	4	40	23	17
1982-83 Coppa Italia	–	5	3	1	1	8	3	5	3	0	2	7	5	10	6	1	3	15	8	7
1982-83 UEFA Cup Winners' Cup	–	3	2	1	0	5	1	3	0	0	3	2	5	6	2	1	3	7	6	1
Total		23	11	8	4	35	16	23	9	8	6	27	21	46	20	16	10	62	37	25

=== Players statistics ===
No.	Pos	Nat	Player	Total		1982-83 Serie A	
No.	Pos	Nat	Player	Apps	Goals	Apps	Goals
	GK	(Italy) ITA	Ivano Bordon	30	-23	30	-23
	DF	(Italy) ITA	Gabriele Oriali	25	2	25	2
	DF	(Italy) ITA	Giuseppe Baresi	27	0	25+2	0
	DF	(Italy) ITA	Giuseppe Bergomi	28	1	28	1
	DF	(Italy) ITA	Fulvio Collovati	28	0	27+1	0
	MF	(Italy) ITA	Gianpiero Marini	25	1	24+1	1
	MF	(Italy) ITA	Salvatore Bagni	28	5	28	5
	MF	(Italy) ITA	Evaristo Beccalossi	26	1	23+3	1
	MF	(West Germany) FRG	Hansi Müller	22	4	22	4
	MF	(Italy) ITA	Antonio Sabato	22	0	18+4	0
	FW	(Italy) ITA	Alessandro Altobelli	30	15	30	15
	GK	(Italy) ITA	Walter Zenga	0	0	0	0
	DF	(Italy) ITA	Graziano Bini	18	2	17+1	2
	MF	(Italy) ITA	Roberto Bergamaschi	25	2	16+9	2
	FW	(Brazil) BRA	Juary	21	2	11+10	2
	DF	(Italy) ITA	Riccardo Ferri	12	0	5+7	0
	MF	(Italy) ITA	Daniele Bernazzani	11	0	1+10	0
	MF	(Italy) ITA	Massimo Pellegrini	1	0	0+1	0

- Source: http://calcio-seriea.net/presenze/1982/881/

== See also ==
- "Almanacco illustrato del calcio" (in Italian). Modena. Panini Editore. 1983. p. 572. ISSN 1129-3381.
- Filippo Grassia; Gianpiero Lotito (2008). "INTER - Dalla nascita allo scudetto del centenario". Edit Vallardi. Antonio Vallardi Editore. p. 239. ISBN 978-88-95684-11-6.
