= Roberto Bergamaschi =

Roberto Bergamaschi may refer to:

- Roberto Bergamaschi (footballer) (born 1960), Italian footballer
- Roberto Bergamaschi (professor), professor and colorectal surgery specialist
