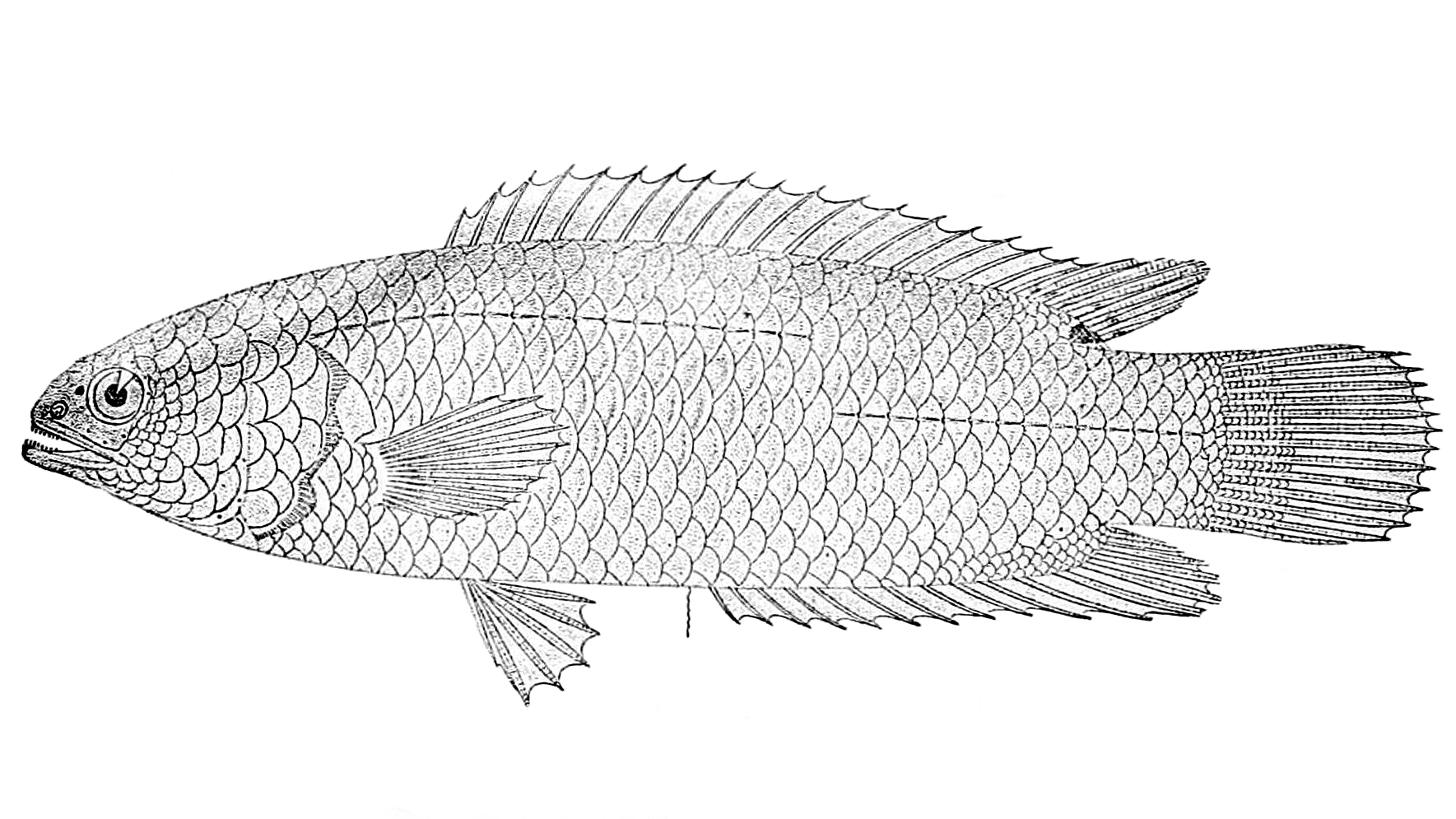

Conservation status
- Least Concern (IUCN 3.1)

Scientific classification
- Kingdom: Animalia
- Phylum: Chordata
- Class: Actinopterygii
- Order: Anabantiformes
- Family: Anabantidae
- Genus: Ctenopoma
- Species: C. multispine

Binomial name
- Ctenopoma multispine W. K. H. Peters, 1844

= Ctenopoma multispine =

Species of fish

Ctenopoma multispine, known as the many-spined ctenopoma or climbing perch, is an African freshwater fish. It is up to 14 cm (5.5 in) long and occurs in the Lufira River, Lualaba River, Upemba River, Luapula-Moero in the Democratic Republic of the Congo, Upper Zambezi in Zambia and Okavango River-Lake Ngami in Angola and Botswana. It is also known from the Kafue, rivers of coastal Mozambique, Cuanza River in Angola, and southern tributaries of the Congo River system.

It may be found in well-vegetated riverine backwaters, floodplain lagoons, swamps, and isolated pans. This cryptically coloured species feeds on a wide range of prey, including smaller fish, crustaceans, and insects, and hunts by slow stalking. Adults gather in large groups to breed, after which eggs are scattered in suitable places, with no further parental care. The species is capable of surviving in warm, shallow water and may move across high ground in search of better sites in wet weather or at night. This can occur in some numbers and in the Zambezi this species has been observed leaving the river out into freshly flooded grasslands in relatively large numbers, for example 62 specimens were counted from a single mat of vegetation which had been grounded on the riverbank. A study in the Okavango Delta of Botswana this species, and another Anabantid species Microctenopoma intermedium, were found to be the hosts of five species of Trichodinid ectoparasites, four of which were new to science.

This species was formally described by the German naturalist Wilhelm Peters in 1844 with the type locality given as Quellimane, Mozambique. It is the type species of the genus Ctenopoma.
