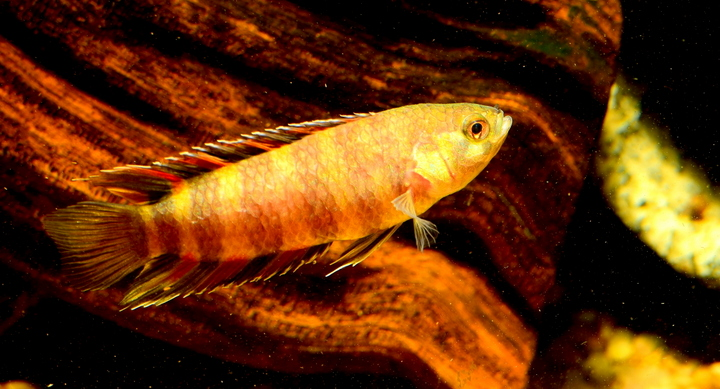

Conservation status
- Least Concern (IUCN 3.1)

Scientific classification
- Kingdom: Animalia
- Phylum: Chordata
- Class: Actinopterygii
- Order: Anabantiformes
- Family: Anabantidae
- Genus: Microctenopoma
- Species: M. ansorgii

Binomial name
- Microctenopoma ansorgii (Boulenger, 1912)

Synonyms
- Anabas ansorgii (Boulenger, 1912); Anabas davidae (Poll, 1939); Ctenopoma ansorgei (Boulenger, 1912); Ctenopoma ansorgii (Boulenger, 1912); Ctenopoma davidae (Poll, 1939); Microctenopoma ansorgei (Boulenger, 1912)

= Microctenopoma ansorgii =

Species of fish

Microctenopoma ansorgii is a small freshwater fish, known in the aquarium trade as the ornate ctenopoma, orange ctenopoma, ornate climbing perch, pretty ctenopoma, or rainbow ctenopoma. It is related to the more familiar spotted climbing perch (Ctenopoma acutirostre), but looks very different. Its body is more elongated and rounded, with fins with red and black stripes; the color intensifies when the fish are displaying, with black bars becoming visible on the body. The ornate ctenopoma spawns at night, laying its eggs on a floating bubble nest like its relatives in the osphronemidae. It lives in the slow-flowing forest streams of the Congo Basin, where it feeds on worms, insect larvae, and other aquatic invertebrates. It is the most common member of its genus in the aquarium trade, where it is known for being a shy, easily bullied fish that needs live or frozen foods and which benefits from the presence of smaller dither fish to encourage it to come out of hiding.

This species was described by George Albert Boulenger in 1912 from a type locality of some lagoons near Luali River at Lundo in the Democratic Republic of Congo. The collector of the type, the explorer William John Ansorge (1850–1913).
