= Chamarrita =

Two types of music and dance

Chamarrita can refer to two different types of music and dance, one from the Azores in Portugal and one from the Rio de la Plata littoral region in northern Argentina, Uruguay, and southern Brazil.

== Azorean Chamarrita ==
The chamarrita from the Azores is a dance to a 3/4 rhythm traditionally played on the fiddle with or without accompaniment.

Though its origin is based in the Azores and Madeira, the Chamarrita is also prevalent in Brazil thanks to Azorean settlers who came to Brazil in the eighteenth century. However, it is often recognized as Chimarrita by Brazilians in Rio Grande de Sul. The vowel change is suspected to be an unintentional error by natives. The dance is also popular in Santa Catarina, Paraná, and São Paulo where it has gained new reformations influenced by the waltz.

Instruments often include the guitar, harmonica and accordion. Dancers, usually in pairs, wear authentic gaucho clothes reflecting Azorean culture. The dance itself is a lively dance done in a circle. There is a caller who sings out directions to all the dancers. The pairs of dancers gather in opposite rows, approaching and moving away as the music progresses. The following is an example of a Chamaritta verse with the English translation.

A moda da Chamarrita

Nã tem nada que aprender,

E andar comum pé no ar

E outro no chão a bater

Quero cantar e bailar

Com a moça mais bonita

Bater o pé no terreiro

Dar voltas a Chamarrita

The old Chamarrita dance

Is really easy to learn

Just lift a foot in the air

And stamp the other on the floor

I want to sing and dance

With the prettiest gal

Stamp my foot on the ground

In a Chamarrita round

=== Chamarrita in the Guinness World Records ===
In 2015, the Câmara Municipal da Madalena, a government office on the Azorean island of Pico, organized the largest Portuguese folk dance in hopes to promote their hometown and their traditions. 544 people participated in the paired dance forming a gigantic circle located in the city's stadium. A member of the City Hall of Madalena said, “It’s with great pride that we celebrate the achievement of this record. Proud to know that in this way our traditions are respected, renewed and projected into the future.”

== Chamarrita in California ==
The chamarrita was brought to California by Azorean immigrants. Musicologist Sidney Robertson Cowell collected two chamarritas in 1939 for the WPA Folk Music Project, one in Richmond played on two violas de arame, and the other in Oakland played on "English guitar." In 1947, Portuguese American musician Anthony Sears recorded his tune "A Chamarrita Nova" in Oakland with the help of two Italian Americans; it was arranged by mandolinist Rudy Cipolla of San Francisco and conducted by violinist Vincent di Bianca of Berkeley. Old Time musician Kenny Hall, who grew up in the San Francisco Bay Area and moved to Fresno later in life, played two chamarritas as part of his repertoire, though he called them "chamaritzas." Chamarritas are such a large part of Portuguese American festas in both Pescadero and Sausalito that the festivals are often called "chamarritas" by non-Portuguese. The chamarrita is also danced at other California festas including those in Manteca and at the San Joaquin Portuguese Festival in Turlock.

== Littoral Chamarrita ==
The chamarrita from the Rio de la Plata region has been suggested to descend from the Azorean chamarrita, but there is no conclusive evidence of this.

== See also ==
- Fandango
- Bolero
- Sevillanas
- Waltz
- Milonga (music)
- Milonga (dance)
- Tango music
- Tango (dance)
