= Bergamaschi =

Bergamaschi is an Italian surname. Notable people with the surname include:

- Arianna Bergamaschi (born 1975), Italian singer, songwriter, stage actress and television presenter
- Emiliano Bergamaschi (born 1976), Argentine rugby union coach and former player
- Franco Bergamaschi (born 1951), Italian footballer
- Mario Bergamaschi (1929–2020), Italian footballer
- Roberto Bergamaschi (born 1960), Italian footballer
- Roberto Bergamaschi, Professor and colorectal surgery specialist
- Valentina Bergamaschi (born 1997), Italian footballer
- Vasco Bergamaschi (1909–1979), Italian cyclist
