= Bachlechner =

Bachlechner is a German surname. Notable people with the surname include:

- Klaus Bachlechner (born 1952), Italian footballer
- Thomas Bachlechner (born 1980), Italian footballer, son of Klaus
