= Microctenopoma ocellifer =

Conservation status
- Least Concern (IUCN 3.1)

Scientific classification
- Kingdom: Animalia
- Phylum: Chordata
- Class: Actinopterygii
- Order: Anabantiformes
- Family: Anabantidae
- Genus: Microctenopoma
- Species: M. ocellifer

Binomial name
- Microctenopoma ocellifer (Nichols, 1928)

Synonyms
- Anabas muriei ocellifer Nichols, 1928: Ctenopoma muriei ocellifer (Nichols, 1928)

Species of fish

Microctenopoma ocellifer is a fish in the family Anabantidae. It is found in the upper Congo River basin in the Democratic Republic of Congo and in Zambia. It grows to 5.4 cm in total length.
