= Microctenopoma nigricans =

Conservation status
- Least Concern (IUCN 3.1)

Scientific classification
- Kingdom: Animalia
- Phylum: Chordata
- Class: Actinopterygii
- Order: Anabantiformes
- Family: Anabantidae
- Genus: Microctenopoma
- Species: M. nigricans

Binomial name
- Microctenopoma nigricans S. M. Norris, 1995

Species of fish

Microctenopoma nigricans is a fish in the family Anabantidae. It is found in the Lulua and Sankuru River drainages, tributaries of the Kasai River (Congo River system) in south-central Democratic Republic of Congo. It grows to 6.8 cm in standard length.
