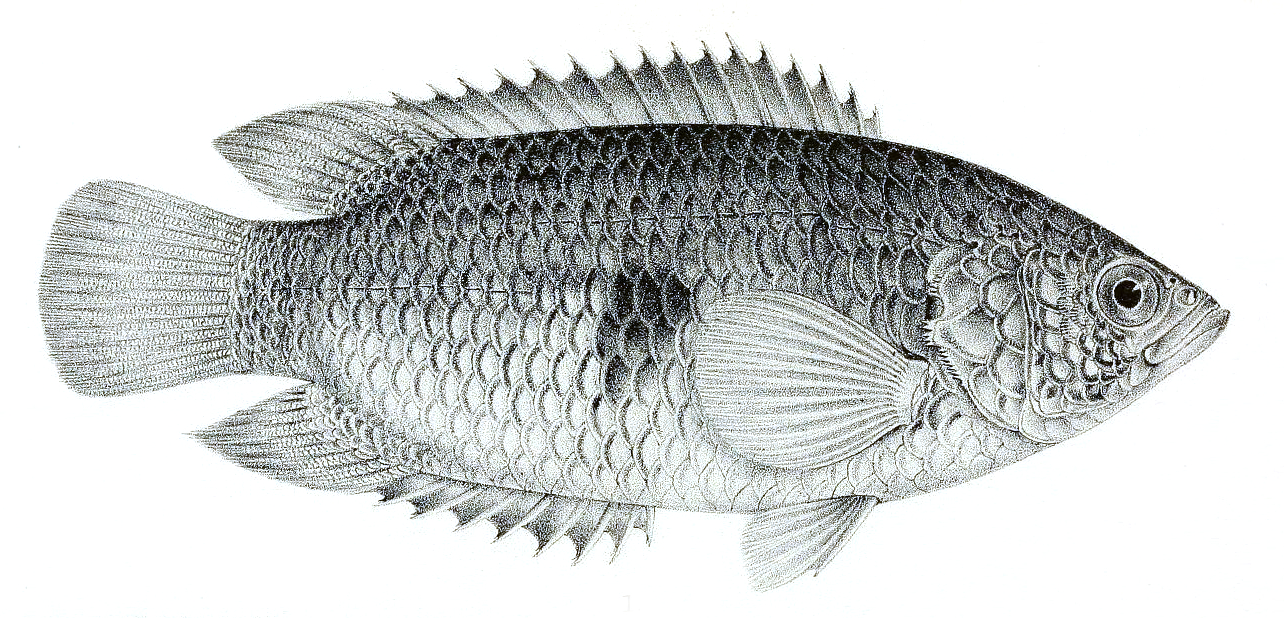

Conservation status
- Least Concern (IUCN 3.1)

Scientific classification
- Kingdom: Animalia
- Phylum: Chordata
- Class: Actinopterygii
- Order: Anabantiformes
- Family: Anabantidae
- Genus: Ctenopoma
- Species: C. maculatum

Binomial name
- Ctenopoma maculatum Thominot, 1886

= Ctenopoma maculatum =

Species of fish

Ctenopoma maculatum is a fish in the family Anabantidae found in the coastal rivers from South Cameroon to the Democratic Republic of the Congo in the Chad, Ogoué, and Congo River basins. They grow to 20.0 cm in total length.
