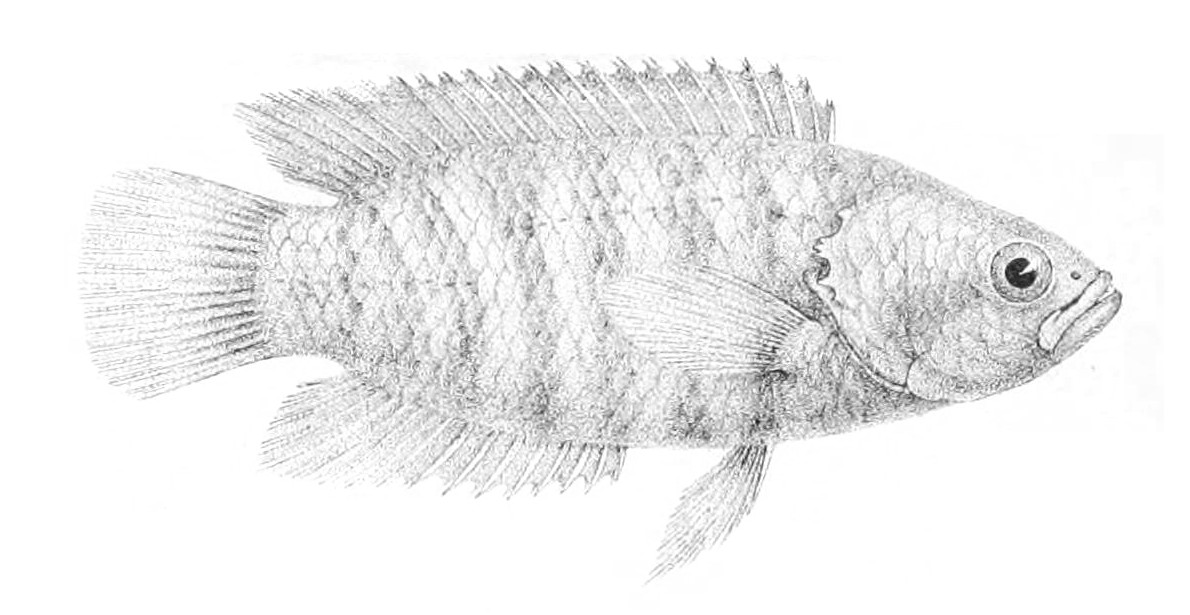

Conservation status
- Least Concern (IUCN 3.1)

Scientific classification
- Kingdom: Animalia
- Phylum: Chordata
- Class: Actinopterygii
- Order: Anabantiformes
- Family: Anabantidae
- Genus: Microctenopoma
- Species: M. nanum

Binomial name
- Microctenopoma nanum (Günther, 1896)

Synonyms
- Ctenopoma nanum Günther, 1896; Anabas nanus (Günther, 1896); Anabas brunneus Ahl, 1927

= Microctenopoma nanum =

Species of fish

Microctenopoma nanum, the dwarf ctenopoma, is a fish in the family Anabantidae found in southern Cameroon, Gabon, and the Congo Basin of Africa. It grows to 8.0 cm in total length.
