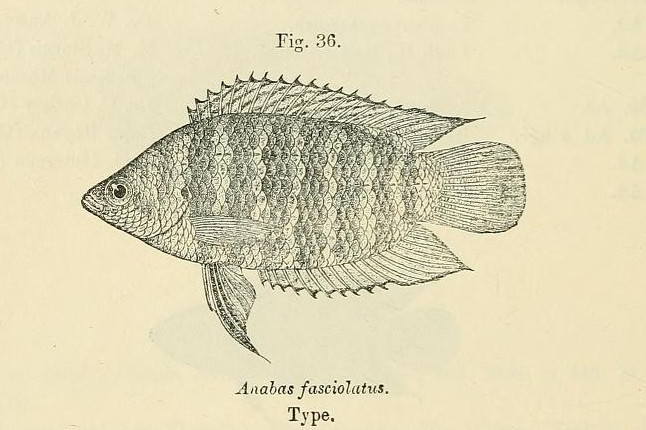

Conservation status
- Least Concern (IUCN 3.1)

Scientific classification
- Kingdom: Animalia
- Phylum: Chordata
- Class: Actinopterygii
- Order: Anabantiformes
- Family: Anabantidae
- Genus: Microctenopoma
- Species: M. fasciolatum

Binomial name
- Microctenopoma fasciolatum (Boulenger, 1899)

Synonyms
- Ctenopoma fasciolatum Boulenger, 1899; Ctenopoma fasciolatum (Boulenger, 1899)

= Microctenopoma fasciolatum =

Species of fish

Microctenopoma fasciolatum or the banded bushfish is an Anabantoid fish of the genus Microctenopoma. It is native to the Republic of Congo, the Democratic Republic of Congo and a few rivers in Cameroon, occurring in the lower and central parts of the Congo River. This species has numerous irregular dark stripes running vertically across its body, with a horizontal lighter stripe separating them. The banding becomes more pronounced as the fish ages. In males, the dorsal and annal fins are more pointed, and - in some populations - have bright iridescent blue spots. This species, like many related anabantoids lays its approximately 1000 eggs into a bubble nest. This fish grows to a size of 9 cm (3.5 in).

== In the aquarium ==
This anabantoid rarely appears in the aquarium hobby; when it does it is noted for being somewhat shy and retiring, but not particularly challenging to keep. Males can be territorial, especially in small aquaria. It prefers a pH of 6.5 - 7.5 and a temperature of 24 to 28 °C (75 to 82 °F), along with a water hardness of 50 mgl.
