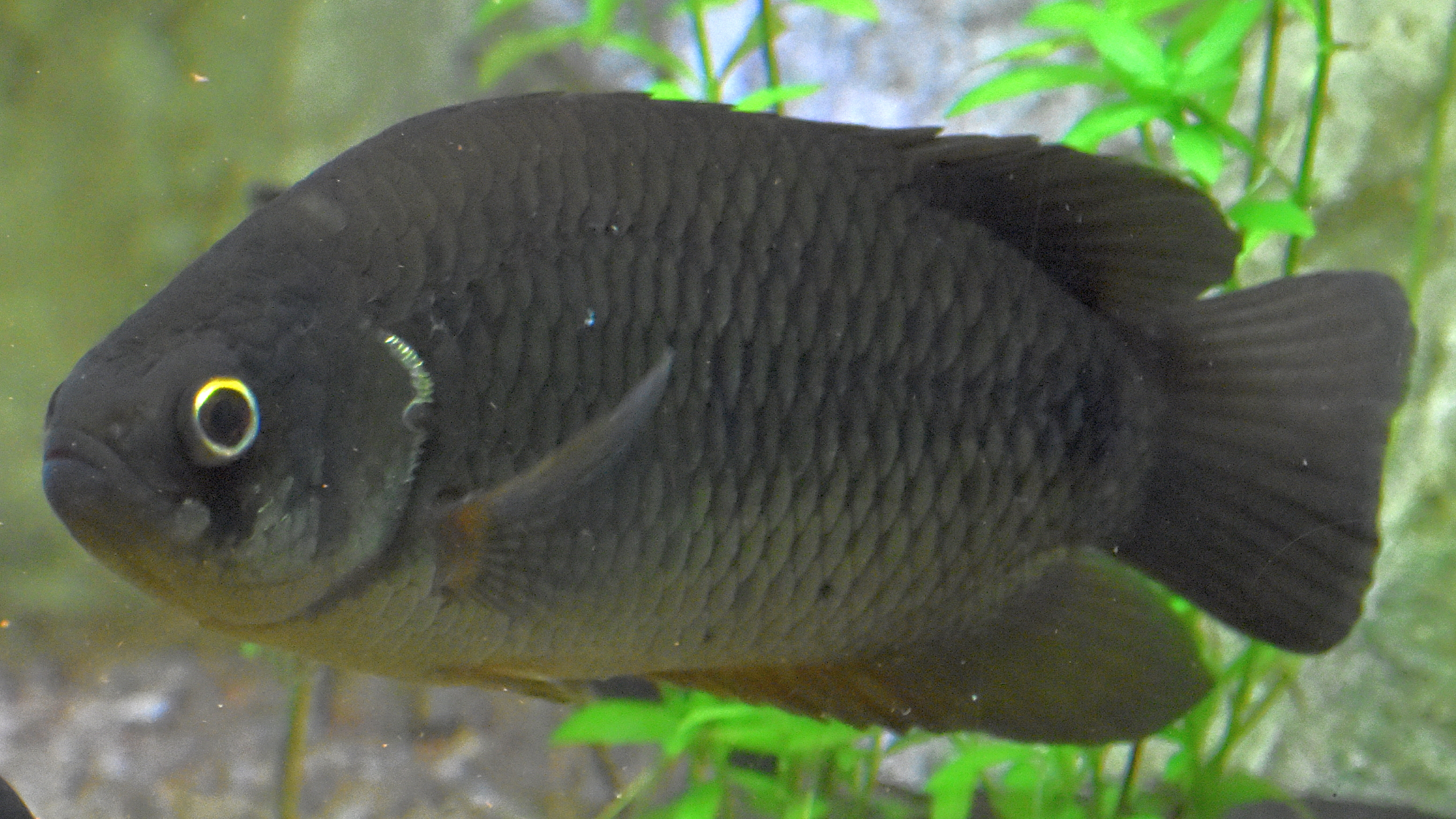

Conservation status
- Least Concern (IUCN 3.1)

Scientific classification
- Kingdom: Animalia
- Phylum: Chordata
- Class: Actinopterygii
- Division: Teleostei
- Order: Anabantiformes
- Family: Anabantidae
- Genus: Ctenopoma
- Species: C. kingsleyae

Binomial name
- Ctenopoma kingsleyae Günther, 1896

= Ctenopoma kingsleyae =

Species of fish

Ctenopoma kingsleyae is a fish in the family Anabantidae found in the coastal rivers from Senegal to the Democratic Republic of the Congo, including the Senegal, Volta, Niger, and Congo River basins.
