= Microctenopoma damasi =

Conservation status
- Least Concern (IUCN 3.1)

Scientific classification
- Kingdom: Animalia
- Phylum: Chordata
- Class: Actinopterygii
- Order: Anabantiformes
- Family: Anabantidae
- Genus: Microctenopoma
- Species: M. damasi

Binomial name
- Microctenopoma damasi (Poll & Damas, 1939)

Synonyms
- Anabas damasi Poll & Damas, 1939; Ctenopoma damasi (Poll & Damas, 1939)

Species of fish

Microctenopoma damasi is a species of fish in the family Anabantidae. It is found in the Democratic Republic of the Congo and Uganda. Its natural habitat is rivers. This species was formally described in 1939 as Anabas damasi by the Belgian ichthyologist Max Poll, the type locality given was Semliki River at Ishango in the Democratic Republic of Congo. The type was collected by Hubert Damas (1910–1964) of the University of Liège and when he described the species Poll named Damas as co-author, this meant that Damas was the co-author of a specific name which honoured himself.
