= Rebosio =

Rebosio is an Italian surname from Lombardy and Liguria. Notable people with the surname include:

- Edgardo Rebosio (1914–?), Italian footballer
- Miguel Rebosio (born 1976), Peruvian footballer
