= Pellegrini =

Pellegrini may refer to:

== People ==
- Pellegrini (surname), an Italian surname; includes a list of notable people with the surname

== Places ==
=== Cities ===
- Carlos Pellegrini, Santa Fe, a city in Santa Fe Province, Argentina
- Pellegrini, Buenos Aires, a city in Buenos Aires Province, Argentina

=== Political entities ===
- Pellegrini Department, an administrative division in Santiago del Estero Province, Argentina
- Pellegrini Partido, an administrative subdivision in Buenos Aires Province, Argentina

== Species of fish ==
- Ctenopoma pellegrini, a species of fish
- Cyprinus pellegrini, a species of cyprinid fish
- Eleotris pellegrini, a species of fish
- Labeo pellegrini, a species of fish
- Labeobarbus pellegrini, a species of ray-finned fish
- Rheocles pellegrini, a species of rainbow fish
- Trachinus pellegrini, a species of fish commonly known as the Cape Verde weever

== Transportation ==
- Carlos Pellegrini (Buenos Aires Metro), a metro station in Buenos Aires, Argentina
- Pellegrini station, a light rail station in Mendoza, Argentina

== Other uses ==
- Escuela Superior de Comercio Carlos Pellegrini, a high school in Argentina
- Gran Premio Carlos Pellegrini, an Argentine horse race
- Pellegrini Avenue (Rosario), an avenue in Rosario, Argentina
- Pellegrini Lake, an artificial lake located on the Argentine Patagonia
- Pellegrini Quartet, a string quartet formed in Germany in 1989
- Pellegrini's Espresso Bar, a café in Melbourne, Australia
