= Marcello Provenzale =

Italian painter

- Self-portrait, oil on canvas, c. 1620, Rome, Galleria Borghese
- Born: 1586; Cento, Papal States
- Died: 4 June 1639 (aged 52–53); Rome, Papal States
- Education: Paolo Rossetti da Cento
- Known for: Painting; Mosaic
- Movement: Baroque
- Patrons: House of Borghese

Marcello Provenzale (1575 – 4 June 1639) was an Italian Baroque painter and mosaicist. He had an important role in the mosaic decoration of St. Peter's Basilica.

== Biography ==
Marcello Provenzale was born in Cento, near Ferrara, to Melchiorre and Maria Conforti. His family was well-off and had aristocratic origins. After receiving his initial training in his hometown, he moved to Rome, where he became a pupil of Paolo Rossetti, a fellow native of Cento and an expert in mosaic art.

Provenzale's first documented work was on the pendentives of the main dome of St. Peter's Basilica, where, in 1600, with Rossetti and Lodovico Martinelli, he executed some of the putti and decorative elements around the roundels representing the Evangelists, working from cartoons by Pomarancio. It must have been on that project, and not on the decoration of the Clementine Chapel, that Provenzale learned from Rossetti the art of mosaics.

In the Clementine Chapel, Provenzale emerged as an independent and wholly proficient mosaicist. Alone, he made the pendentive mosaic representing Saint Ambrose and the lunette mosaic with Daniel in the lions' den; he also contributed to the decorations in the vault. In the vault of the main dome of the basilica, he executed the figures of saints Philip, Andrew, and John the Evangelist, as well as portions of the frieze in the drum.

Between 1603 and 1612, Provenzale collaborated with his master, Rossetti, on the decorations on the vault of the main dome of St. Peter's Basilica. The cartoons for the decorations were designed by the Giuseppe Cesari. From 1617 to 1618, he oversaw the restoration of Giotto's Navicella. The Navicella occupied a large part of the wall above the entrance arcade, facing the main façade of the basilica across the courtyard. It had remained in place until 1610, when the courtyard was torn down to make room for the new building. After Provenzale's restoration, it was placed over a fountain near a door that gave access to the Vatican Palace. Provenzale's restoration was a great success, and earned him praise from Giovanni Baglione. In recognition for his work, Pope Paul V appointed him Knight of the Golden Spur (cavaliere aurato).

St. John the Evangelist, executed the by Provenzale on the vault of the main dome of St. Peter's Basilica

From 1619 to 1621 Provenzale is named as munizioniere of the Fabric of Saint Peter, which connects him with the making and distribution of smalti and tesserae for mosaics. Although he lived until 1639, this seems to have been his last association with Saint Peter's. Provenzale was renowned as a master of small-scale, easel-sized mosaics, intended for high-ranking patrons. Beginning in 1600, he experimented with the use of tiny glass tesserae and was among the first to create micromosaics. Colored enamels, melted into extremely thin glass rods, were cut into minute segments and arranged with great precision, achieving tonal transitions and graphic details far more nuanced than those found in traditional mosaics.

The members of the House of Borghese were Provenzale's principal patrons, and for them he executed a portrait of Pope Paul V and many small panels, such as the mosaic of an owl and other small birds in a landscape with the Acqua Paola and the façade of Saint Peter's, signed and dated 1616, which Scipione Borghese sent as a gift to Ferdinando II de' Medici. In 1600, Provenzale gifted the cardinal with his painting Madonna and Child (now in the Galleria Borghese, Rome). Provenzale maintained strong ties to his hometown. In the collegiate church of San Biagio in Cento, he painted an altarpiece depicting the Transfiguration, signed and dated 1606. While in Cento, he formed a close friendship with the young, promising artist Giovanni Francesco Barbieri, better known as Guercino. In 1619, Provenzale commissioned Guercino Erminia Tending to the Wounded Tancred (Rome, Galleria Doria Pamphilj), the first work by the Emilian painter to reach Rome. Provenzale gifted the canvas to Cardinal Stefano Pignatelli, a close confidant of Cardinal Scipione Borghese, introducing Guercino to the Roman aristocratic milieu.

In 1638, the year before his death, Porvenzale created a bronze self-portrait bust, (Cento, Collegiate Church of San Biagio). He died on 4 June 1639 at the Palazzo Borghese in Rome. His best-known pupil was Giovanni Battista Calandra, who inherited the responsibility for mosaics at St. Peter's Basilica.

== Gallery ==
Orpheus, 1618, Galleria Borghese, Rome

Owl and Other Birds, 1616, Galleria Borghese

Madonna and Child, 1600, Galleria Borghese, Rome

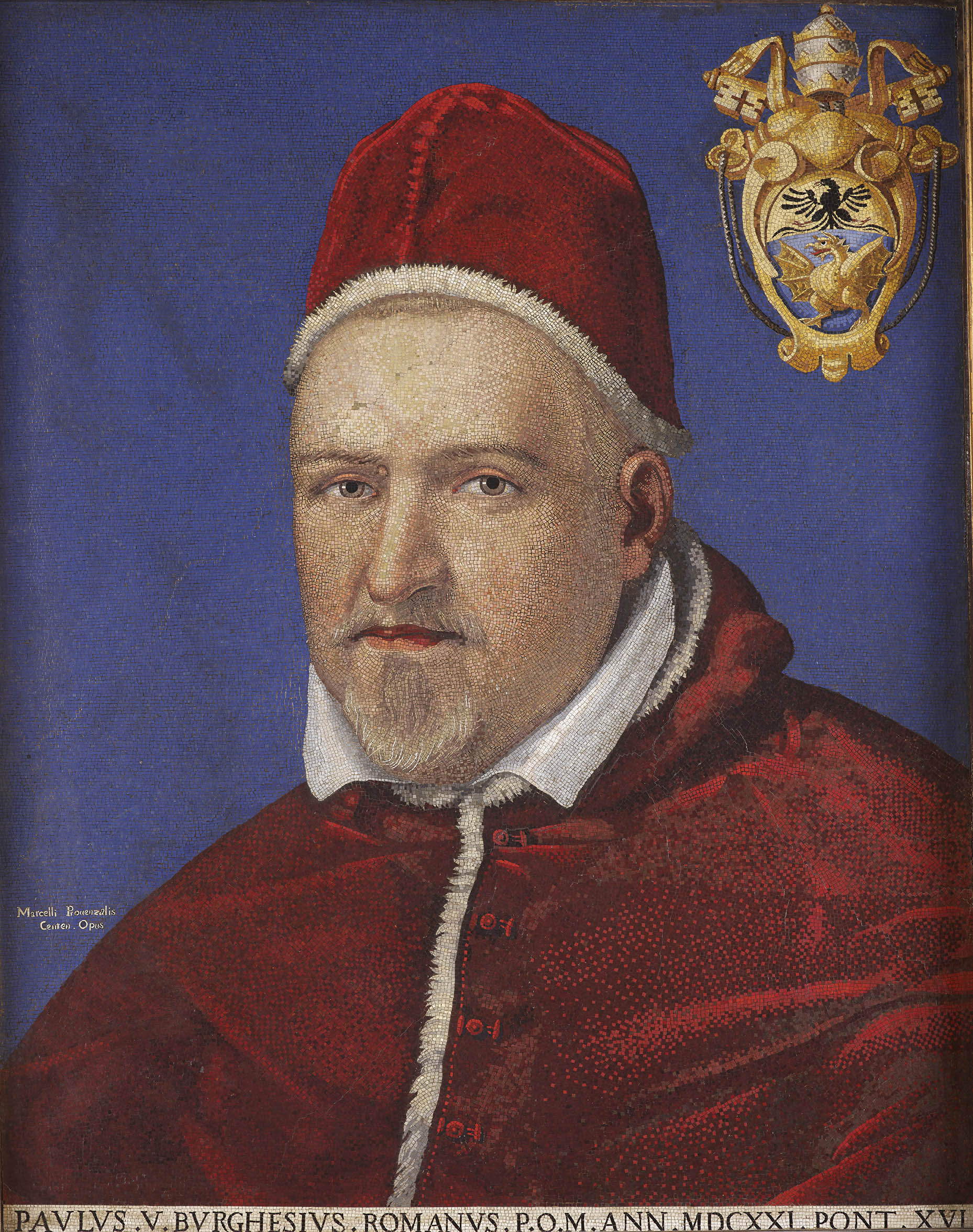
Portrait of Pope Paul V, 1621, Galleria Borghese, Rome

St. John the Evangelist. Mosaic on the pendentives of the main dome of St. Peter's Basilica

One of the putti realized by Provenzale on the pendentives of the main dome of St. Peter's Basilica

Jesus Christ, Cento, collezione Grimaldi Fava

== Bibliography ==
- Baglione, Giovanni (1642). Le vite de' pittori scultori et architetti dal pontificato di Gregorio XIII. Rome: Andrea Fei. pp. 349–50.
- Bryan, Michael (1889). Walter Armstrong; Robert Edmund Graves (eds.). Dictionary of Painters and Engravers, Biographical and Critical. Vol. II L-Z. London: George Bell and Sons. p. 326.
- DiFederico, Frank R. (1983). The Mosaics of Saint Peter's Decorating the New Basilica. University Park: Penn State University Press.
- L'Occaso, Stefano (2016). "PROVENZALE, Marcello". Dizionario Biografico degli Italiani (in Italian). Vol. 85: Ponzone–Quercia. Rome: Institute of the Italian Encyclopaedia. ISBN 978-88-12-00032-6.
