= Giovanni Battista Calandra =

Italian painter (1586 - c. 1644)

- The Baptism of Christ (1620), based on cartoons by Jacopo Ligozzi, Palazzo Pitti, Florence
- Born: 1586; Vercelli, Duchy of Savoy
- Died: 27 October 1644 (aged 57–58); Rome, Papal States
- Resting place: Santa Maria in Traspontina
- Education: Marcello Provenzale
- Known for: Mosaic
- Movement: Baroque

Giovanni Battista Calandra (1586 – 27 October 1644) was an Italian Baroque mosaicist who worked mostly for St. Peter's Basilica. He is considered one of the greatest mosaic artists active in the early 1600s in Rome.

== Biography ==
Giovanni Battista Calandra was born at Vercelli in 1586 to Francesco Calandra, a tailor, and Andrietta Crevola. He began his artistic career at an early age, probably under the guidance of the painter Raffaello Giovenoni, who was a family friend. His will, dated 29 February 1640, reveals that he moved to Rome in 1602 following his father's death. There, he studied under the mosaicist Marcello Provenzale, and soon began collaborating with his master on projects at the Vatican and St. Peter's Basilica.

His earliest documented work dates to 1618: the mosaic of St. Peter and St. Paul in the new courtyard near the main entrance to the Apostolic Palace, based on cartoons by Giovanni Battista Ricci. The following year, he worked for the Aldobrandini family at their villa in Frascati.

In the 1620s, Calandra continued working as a mosaicist at St Peter's, but also undertook commissions for private patrons, such as a mosaic depicting St. Maurice, created in 1627 for Cardinal Maurice of Savoy (untraced). In 1628, he created a mosaic depicting St. Michael to decorate the altar dedicated to the Archangel in St. Peter's Basilica. The cartoons for this piece were realized by Giuseppe Cesari based on a painting by Guido Reni, In 1759 Calandra's mosaic was replaced by a copy to prevent it from being damaged by humidity. The original work is now located in Macerata Cathedral.

The mosaic was a great success, and on 12 November 1629, Calandra was appointed overseer of all mosaic projects within St Peter's Basilica. Between 1630 and 1635, he decorated the pediments in the Cappella della Colonna with mosaics depicting St. Thomas Aquinas and St. John of Damascus (based on cartoons by Andrea Sacchi), and St. Bonaventure and St. Cyril (based on cartoons by Giovanni Lanfranco). During this period, he also completed the restoration of an ancient mosaic from the Temple of Fortuna Primigenia in Palestrina.

Meanwhile, Calandra was working on the mosaics for the Filomarino Chapel in the church of Santi Apostoli, Naples. The mosaics, depicting the Annunciation and the Four Virtues, were based on cartoons by Guido Reni and were completed in 1636. From 1637 to 1639, he returned to work at St Peter's Basilica, decorating the pediments of the Chapel of St. Michael with mosaics depicting St. Leo the Great (based on a cartoon by Andrea Sacchi), St. Bernard (based on a cartoon by Carlo Pellegrini), Dionysius the Areopagite (based on a cartoon by Guido Abbatini), and St. Gregory Thaumaturgus (based on a cartoon by Giovanni Francesco Romanelli).

Portrait of Camillo Rospigliosi, 1630–40, Getty Center, Los Angeles

Dating to 1641–42 are two portraits of Filomarino, created for the Filomarino Chapel and based on cartoons by Guido Reni. Calandra frequently received commissions of this kind, as evidenced by the portraits Camillo Rospigliosi, brother of Pope Clement IX and Knight Commander of the Order of Saint Stephen (1630–40; Getty Center, Los Angeles) and of Cardinal Fausto Poli (Collegiate Church of Santa Maria della Visitazione, Cascia).

In 1643, Calandra became the principe of the Accademia di San Luca, of which he had been a member since 1630. That same year, he resumed work on the Cappella della Colonna in St. Peter's Basilica. He had only just begun the mosaics for the lunettes, based on designs by Romanelli, when he died on 27 October 1644. He was buried in the Church of Santa Maria in Traspontina.

== Bibliography ==
- Pascoli, Lione (1736). Vite de' pittori, scultori, ed architetti moderni. Vol. II. Rome: Antonio de' Rossi. pp. 23–34.
- Bryan, Michael (1886). Graves, Robert Edmund (ed.). Dictionary of Painters and Engravers, Biographical and Critical. Vol. I: A-K. London: George Bell and Sons. p. 209.
- Mazzola, Ludovica (1973). "CALANDRA, Giovanni Battista". Dizionario Biografico degli Italiani (in Italian). Vol. 16: Caccianiga–Caluso. Rome: Institute of the Italian Encyclopaedia. ISBN 978-88-12-00032-6.
