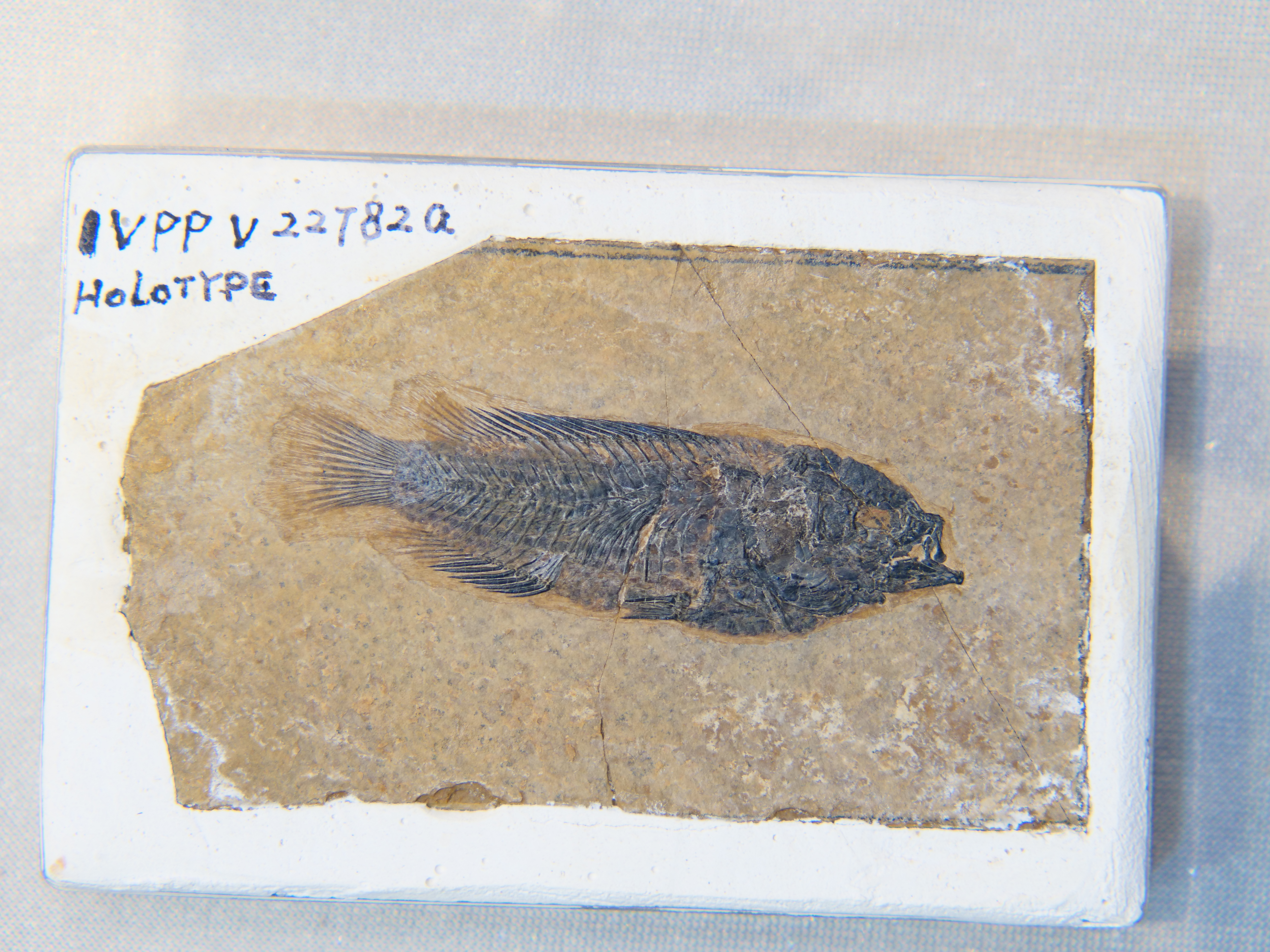
- Specimen of E. thibetana, on display at the Paleozoological Museum of China.

Scientific classification
- Kingdom: Animalia
- Phylum: Chordata
- Class: Actinopterygii
- Division: Teleostei
- Order: Anabantiformes
- Family: Anabantidae
- Genus: †Eoanabas; Wu, Chang, Miao et al., 2017
- Species: †E. thibetana

Binomial name
- †Eoanabas thibetana Wu, Chang, Miao et al, 2017

= Eoanabas =

Eoanabas Temporal range: Late Oligocene, 26 Ma

Extinct genus of fishes

Eoanabas ("dawn Anabas") is an extinct genus of climbing gourami that inhabited southern Asia during the Oligocene. It contains a single species, E. thibetana from the Late Oligocene of Tibet. Fossils were found at 4,000 metres (13,000 ft) above sea level, but the species appears to have inhabited a subtropical freshwater environment 1,000 metres (3,300 ft) above sea level dominated by palms and golden rain trees, suggesting that the cold, dry Tibetan Plateau was originally much more warm and humid during the Oligocene, prior to further uplift of the Himalayas and an increased cooling trend.

The presence of Eoanabas during the Late Oligocene confirms that anabantids likely originated in Southeast Asia during the Eocene, and then dispersed to the Indian subcontinent and Africa afterwards.
