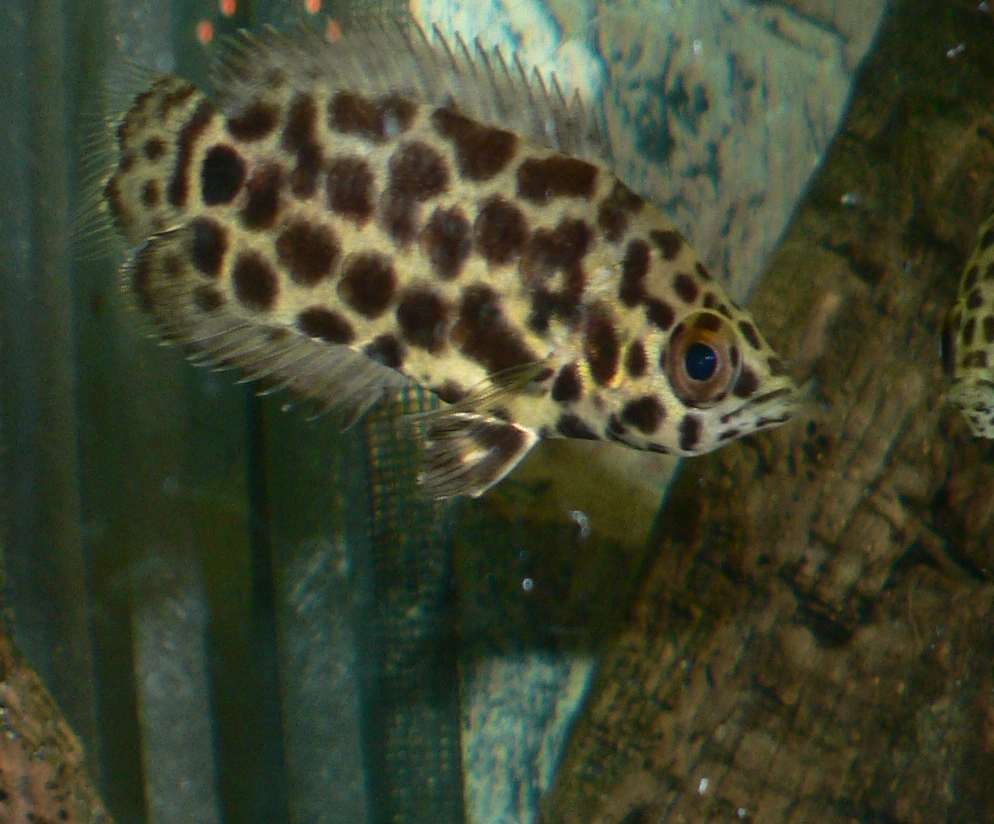

Conservation status
- Least Concern (IUCN 3.1)

Scientific classification
- Kingdom: Animalia
- Phylum: Chordata
- Class: Actinopterygii
- Order: Anabantiformes
- Family: Anabantidae
- Genus: Ctenopoma
- Species: C. acutirostre

Binomial name
- Ctenopoma acutirostre Pellegrin, 1899
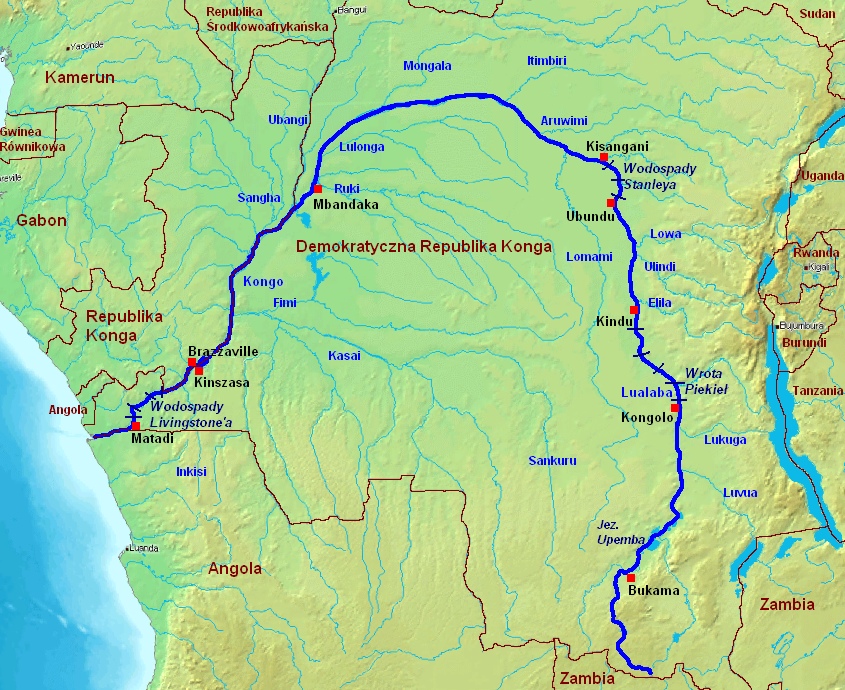
- The leopard bush fish is native to the basin of the Congo River (dark blue)

= Leopard bush fish =

Species of fish

The leopard bush fish (Ctenopoma acutirostre), also known as leopard bushfish, spotted ctenopoma, leopard ctenopoma, spotted climbing perch, spotted leaf fish, spotted cichlid or spotted bushfish, is a freshwater fish. It is a member of the family Anabantidae, which is part of a group popularly known as labyrinth fish (gouramies and relatives).

It is relatively common in the aquarium industry and is often sold as a beginners' "oddball" fish.

== Habitat ==
The leopard bush fish is endemic to the Congo River basin in Middle Africa and has adapted to suit many different biotopes within this system from fast flowing streams to stagnant ponds.

== Size ==
The leopard bush fish is slow-growing and may take several years to reach an adult size which in the wild can easily reach 20 cm (8 in). In captivity a fish of 15 cm (6 in) cm is considered large.

== In the aquarium ==
In the aquarium the leopard bush fish is often seen as a hardy oddball that fits into some community tanks but careful consideration must be taken since it is somewhat aggressive. The leopard bush fish in the wild is a predator so it will take small fish up to the general size of an adult female guppy; anything larger than this will for the most part be ignored. It is not generally a good idea to mix this fish with large aggressive cichlids as they may injure the leopard bush fish or out-compete it for food. Good tank mates for the leopard bush fish include medium-sized gourami species, bala shark, silver dollar, Corydoras, Plecostomus species, Ancistrus catfish, and anything that won't fit into its mouth. They enjoy plentiful space and places to hide, so 55 gallons is acceptable if it is not overstocked and has good filtration.

== Diet ==
In the wild, leopard bush fish will eat any fish or insect that they come across small enough to fit into their mouths. In the aquarium however they will readily learn to accept dead alternatives such as bloodworms (chironomid midge larvae) and some sinking pellets, however that said few learn to accept flake foods and many people prefer to feed them with live food so that they are able to watch the leopard bush fish's unusual stalking method.

== Gallery ==
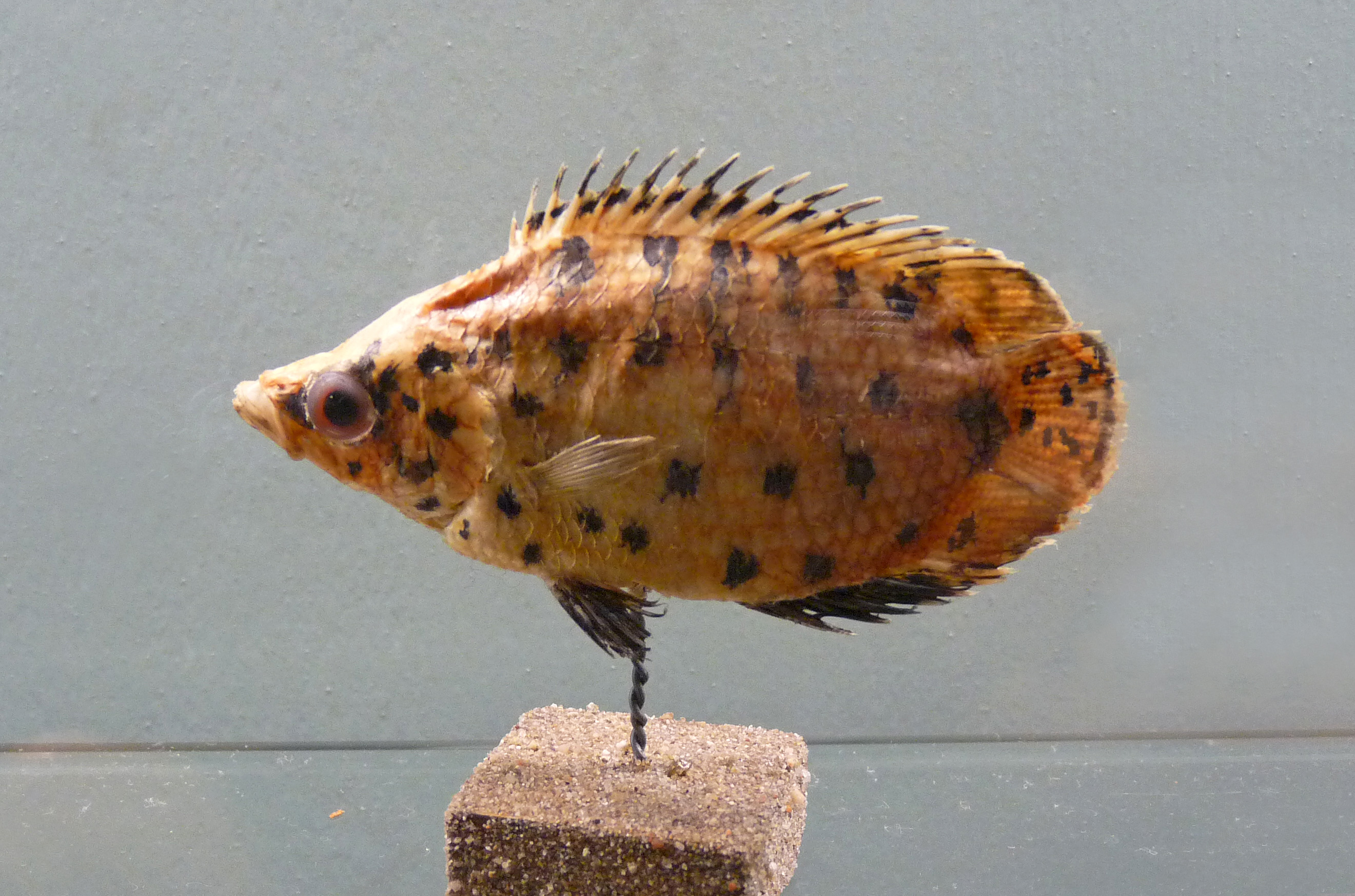
Mounted specimen

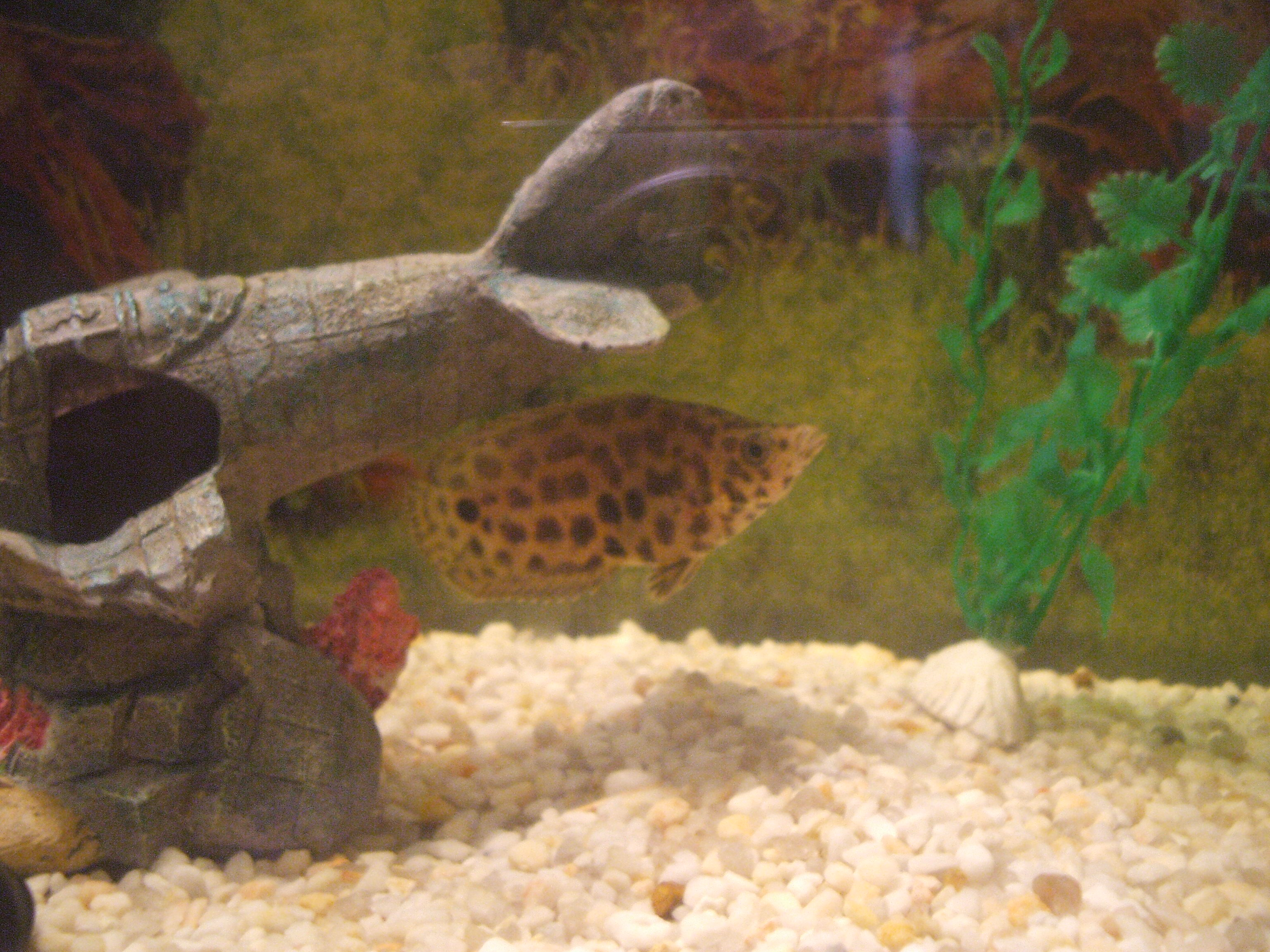
In the aquarium
