= Rudy Cipolla =

Italian-American musician and composer (1900-2000)

- Born: Rodolfo Cipolla; September 21, 1900; San Marco Argentano, Calabria
- Died: January 8, 2000 (aged 99) Concord, California
- Genres: Ballo liscio; Classical music
- Occupations: Musician, composer
- Instruments: Mandolin, Mandocello
- Years active: c. 1912–2000
- Labels: Rounder Records, Acoustic Disc
- Formerly of: David Grisman, Gino Pellegrini Radim Zenkl, Mike Marshall, Bob Bruen, San Francisco Symphony, Berkeley Symphony Orchestra, Beppe Gambetta Berkeley Mandolin Ensemble

Rudy Cipolla, born Rodolfo Cipolla, was an Italian American mandolinist and composer.

Born in the province of Cosenza in 1900, he emigrated to the United States at a very young age, settling in Portland, Oregon at age 8. Though his father played both guitar and mandolin, Rudy was self-taught on both mandolin and mandocello. He moved to San Francisco in 1931 and found work as a musician on local radio. From 1941 on, he owned a shop called the Book Nook in San Francisco, selling candy and comic books while composing music. He played a concert of Vivaldi with the San Francisco Symphony under Enrique Jordá in the 1950s. It was not until 1983 when he released his first album, The World of Rudy Cipolla, produced by his friend and fellow mandolinist David Grisman.

He has numerous compositions for mandolin, some of which are part of the soundtracks of the films Capone and Peggy Sue Got Married. Shortly after he died in 2000, Grisman and other associated musicians hosted a benefit concert for Cipolla's family at The Freight and Salvage. The city of Cosenza wanted to remember him as part of the Invasioni 2000 Festival with a concert performed by Beppe Gambetta, who knew him personally, and Carlo Aonzo.
