= Luca Pellegrini =

Luca Pellegrini may refer to:

- Luca Pellegrini (swimmer) (born 1964), Italian former swimmer
- Luca Pellegrini (footballer, born 1963), retired Italian footballer
- Luca Pellegrini (footballer, born 1999), Italian footballer

== See also ==
- Lucas Pellegrini (born 2000), French footballer
