= Carlos Pellegrini (disambiguation) =

Carlos Pellegrini (1846–1906) was President of Argentina, 1890–1892.

Carlos Pellegrini may also refer to:

- Carlos Pellegrini (Buenos Aires Metro), a station of the Buenos Aires Metro
- Carlos Pellegrini, Santa Fe, a town in Santa Fe Province, Argentina
- Colonia Carlos Pellegrini, a town in Corrientes Province, Argentina
- Gran Premio Carlos Pellegrini, a Grade 1 horse race in Argentina
- Carlos Alberto Pellegrini, American surgeon

== See also ==
- Carlo Pellegrini (disambiguation)
