= Carlo Pellegrini =

Carlo Pellegrini may refer to:

- Carlo Pellegrini (caricaturist) (1839–1889), nicknamed Ape, caricaturist for Vanity Fair magazine
- Carlo Pellegrini (17th-century painter) (1605–1649), Italian painter
- Carlo Pellegrini (19th-century painter) (1866–1937), Italian painter
- Carlo Pellegrini (bishop) (1613–1678), Bishop of Avellino e Frigento

== See also ==
- Carlos Pellegrini (disambiguation)
