= Microctenopoma intermedium =

Conservation status
- Least Concern (IUCN 3.1)

Scientific classification
- Kingdom: Animalia
- Phylum: Chordata
- Class: Actinopterygii
- Order: Anabantiformes
- Family: Anabantidae
- Genus: Microctenopoma
- Species: M. intermedium

Binomial name
- Microctenopoma intermedium (Pellegrin, 1920)

Synonyms
- Anabas intermedius Pellegrin, 1920; Ctenopoma intermedium (Pellegrin, 1920)

Species of fish

Microctenopoma intermedium, also known as blackspot climbing perch, is a fish in the family Anabantidae. It is found in the Okavango, upper and lower Zambezi, and Kafue Rivers, and St. Lucia basin, as well as in the southern tributaries of the Congo system. It grows to 6.2 cm in total length. It is a facultative air-breathing fish that occurs in dense marginal vegetation of various water bodies in swamps and floodplains.
