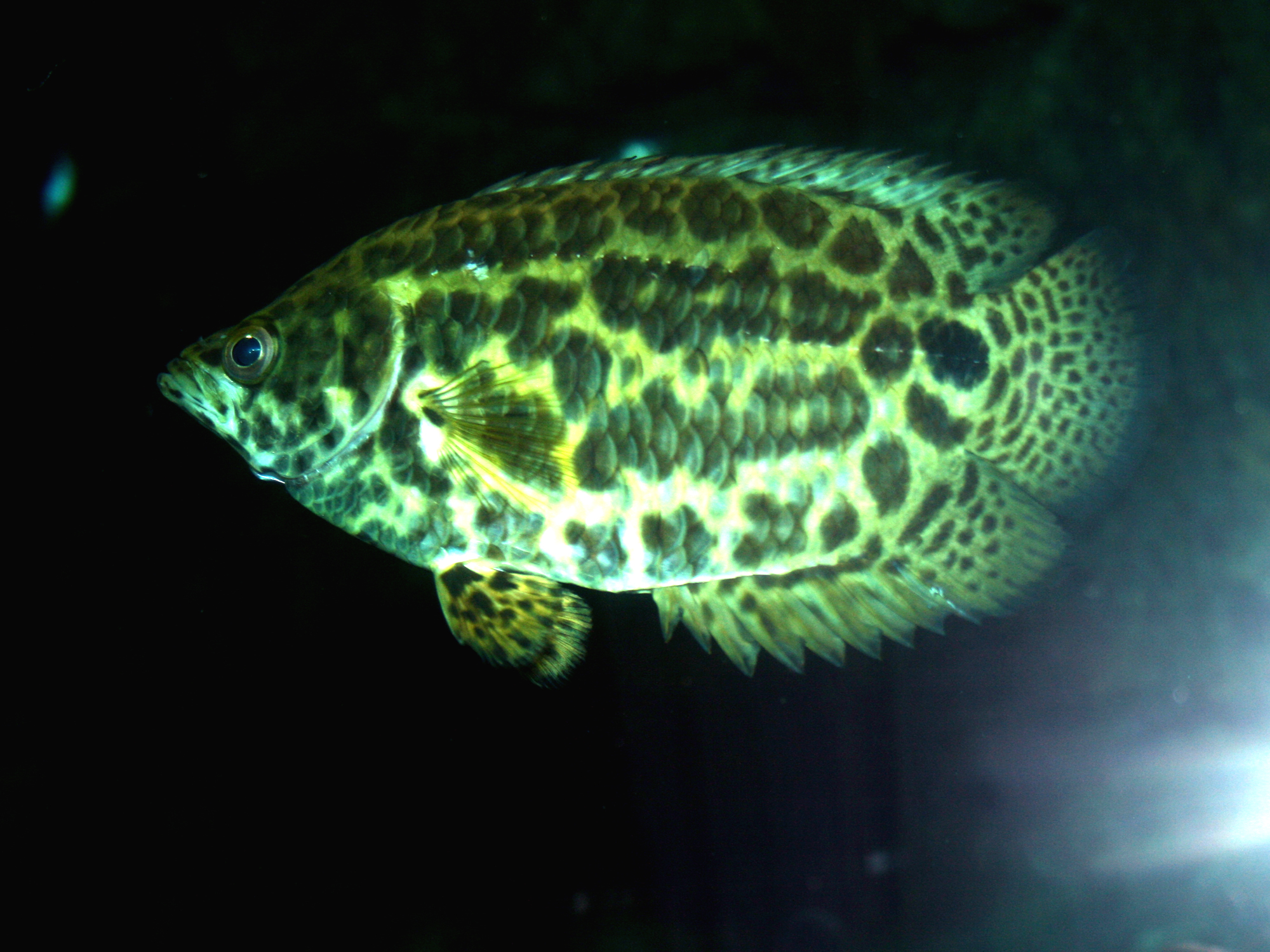
- Spotted ctenopoma (C. acutirostre)

Scientific classification
- Kingdom: Animalia
- Phylum: Chordata
- Class: Actinopterygii
- Division: Teleostei
- Order: Anabantiformes
- Family: Anabantidae
- Genus: Ctenopoma; W. K. H. Peters, 1844

Type species
- Ctenopoma multispinis W.K.H. Peters, 1844

= Ctenopoma =

Genus of fishes

Ctenopoma is a genus of climbing gouramies native to Africa. Microctenopoma has been included in Ctenopoma in the past; in contrast to that genus, Ctenopoma species are egg scatterers with no parental care.

== Species ==
The 15 currently recognized species in this genus are:

- Ctenopoma acutirostre Pellegrin, 1899 (leopard bush fish or spotted ctenopoma)
- Ctenopoma ashbysmithi Banister & R. G. Bailey, 1979
- Ctenopoma gabonense Günther, 1896
- Ctenopoma garuanum (C. G. E. Ahl, 1927)
- Ctenopoma kingsleyae Günther, 1896 (tailspot ctenopoma)
- Ctenopoma machadoi (Fowler, 1930)
- Ctenopoma maculatum Thominot, 1886
- Ctenopoma multispine W. K. H. Peters, 1844 (many-spined ctenopoma)
- Ctenopoma muriei (Boulenger, 1906) (ocellated labyrinth fish)
- Ctenopoma nebulosum S. M. Norris & Teugels, 1990
- Ctenopoma nigropannosum Reichenow, 1875 (twospot climbing perch)
- Ctenopoma ocellatum Pellegrin, 1899 (eyespot ctenopoma)
- Ctenopoma pellegrini (Boulenger, 1902)
- Ctenopoma petherici Günther, 1864
- Ctenopoma weeksii Boulenger, 1896 (mottled ctenopoma)

Synonyms

- Ctenopoma argentoventer (C. G. E. Ahl, 1922) (silverbelly ctenopoma); valid as C. kingsleyae
- Ctenopoma houyi (C. G. E. Ahl, 1927); valid as C. muriei
- Ctenopoma riggenbachi (C. G. E. Ahl, 1927); valid as C. petherici
- Ctenopoma togoensis (C. G. E. Ahl, 1928); valid as C. petherici
