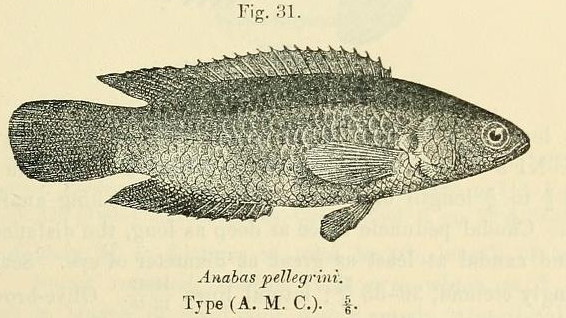

Scientific classification
- Domain: Eukaryota
- Kingdom: Animalia
- Phylum: Chordata
- Class: Actinopterygii
- Order: Anabantiformes
- Family: Anabantidae
- Genus: Ctenopoma
- Species: C. pellegrini

Binomial name
- Ctenopoma pellegrini (Boulenger, 1902)

Synonyms
- Anabas pellegrinii Boulenger, 1902

= Ctenopoma pellegrini =

Species of fish

Ctenopoma pellegrini is a fish in the family Anabantidae found in the Congo River basin of Africa. It grows to 11.2 cm in total length for a male/unsexed specimen. This species was formally described by the British-Belgian ichthyologist George Albert Boulenger in 1902 with the type locality given as Yembe River at Banzyville in the Democratic Republic of Congo. Boulenger honoured the French ichthyologist Jacques Pellegrin (1873-1944).
