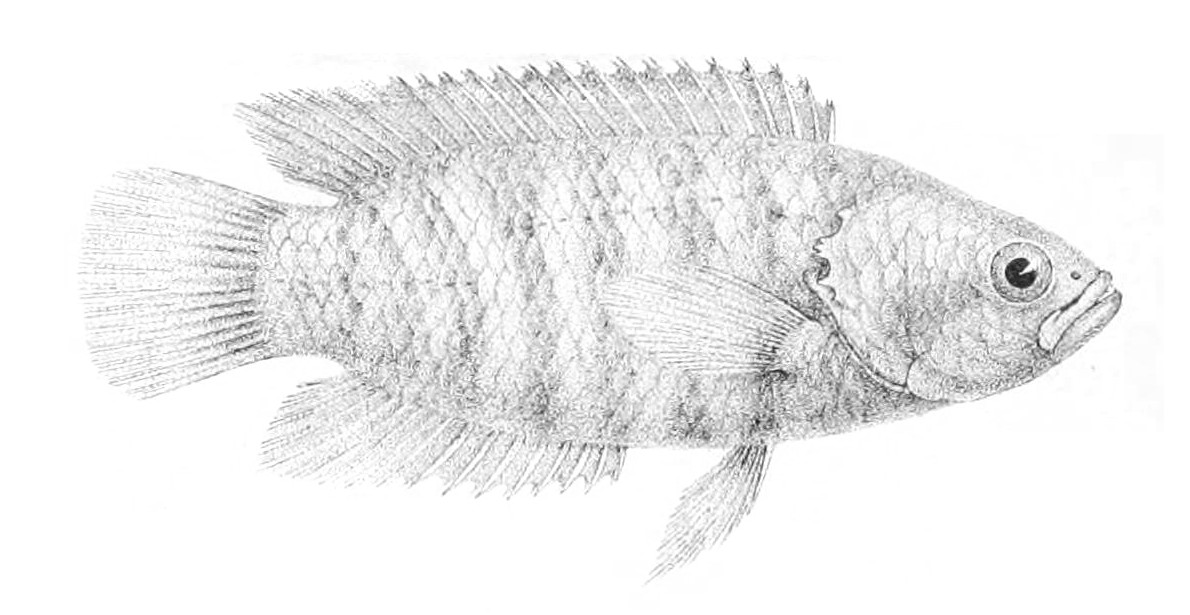
- Microctenopoma nanum

Scientific classification
- Kingdom: Animalia
- Phylum: Chordata
- Class: Actinopterygii
- Division: Teleostei
- Order: Anabantiformes
- Family: Anabantidae
- Genus: Microctenopoma; S. M. Norris, 1995

Type species
- Ctenopoma congicum Boulenger, 1887

= Microctenopoma =

Genus of fishes

Microctenopoma is a genus of fish in the Anabantidae (climbing gourami) family. They are native to Africa. Microctenopoma has been included in Ctenopoma in the past; unlike that genus, they are bubblenest builders, and the males defend the eggs and fry until they are free swimming.

The currently recognized species in this genus are:

- Microctenopoma ansorgii (Boulenger, 1912) (ornate ctenopoma)
- Microctenopoma congicum (Boulenger, 1887) (Congo ctenopoma)
- Microctenopoma damasi (Poll & Damas, 1939)
- Microctenopoma fasciolatum (Boulenger, 1899) (banded ctenopoma)
- Microctenopoma intermedium (Pellegrin, 1920)
- Microctenopoma lineatum (Nichols, 1923)
- Microctenopoma milleri (S. M. Norris & M. E. Douglas, 1991)
- Microctenopoma nanum (Günther, 1896) (dwarf ctenopoma)
- Microctenopoma nigricans S. M. Norris, 1995
- Microctenopoma ocellifer (Nichols, 1928)
- Microctenopoma pekkolai (Rendahl (de), 1935)
- Microctenopoma steveboyesi Skelton, Stauffer, Chakona & Wisor, 2021
- Microctenopoma stevenorrisi Skelton, Stauffer, Chakona & Wisor, 2021
- Microctenopoma uelense S. M. Norris & M. E. Douglas, 1995
