= Kenny Hall (musician) =

American musician (1923–2013)

- Born: Kenneth Martin Hall; October 14, 1923; San Jose, California
- Died: September 18, 2013 (aged 89) Fresno, California
- Genres: Old-time; folk
- Occupations: Musician, teacher
- Instruments: Voice, Mandolin, Fiddle, and Guitar
- Years active: 1929–2013
- Labels: Bay Records, Voyager Recordings, Philo Records

Kenny Hall (1923-2013) was a blind musician and teacher. He was born blind. He was born in San Jose, California, United States, on October 14, 1923. He attended the California School for the Blind in Berkeley, where he learned to play the violin. He later worked in broom factories in both Oakland and San Jose. Over the course of his life, he learned over 1,100 tunes from fellow students at the School for the Blind, coworkers at the broom factories, 78rpm records, and artists like the Happy Hayseeds he heard on the radio. Though he played Old-time music on fiddle and mandolin, he played many tunes from Ireland, Mexico, Scotland, Italy, Portugal, and elsewhere in the world. He picked up the Italian-style bowlback mandolin in 1937 and learned from a blind Texas-born mandolin player named W.D. Sanford. His eclectic repertoire and distinctive mandolin style were influential among folk musicians in the San Francisco Bay Area and San Joaquin Valley.

== Discography ==
- Volume 1 (w/ The Sweets Mill String Band) (Bay Records, 1972)
- Kenny Hall (Philo 1008, 1974)
- Volume 2 (w/ The Sweets Mill String Band) (Bay Records 103, 1977)
- Kenny Hall and the Long Haul String Band (Voyager Recordings VRLP 328-S, 1980)
- All Day Long/All Night Long (w/ The Skiffle Symphony) (Not On Label, 2002)
- Guitar for Pervis (Sword Of Creation, 2005)

== Compilations ==
- Kenny Hall And The Sweets Mill String Band (Bay Records BAY CD 727, 2001)

== Publications ==
Kenny Hall and Vykki Mende Gray. (1999) Kenny Hall's Music Book: Old-Time Music for Fiddle and Mandolin (Mel Bay Publications)
