= Daniele Bernazzani =

Italian footballer (born 1963)

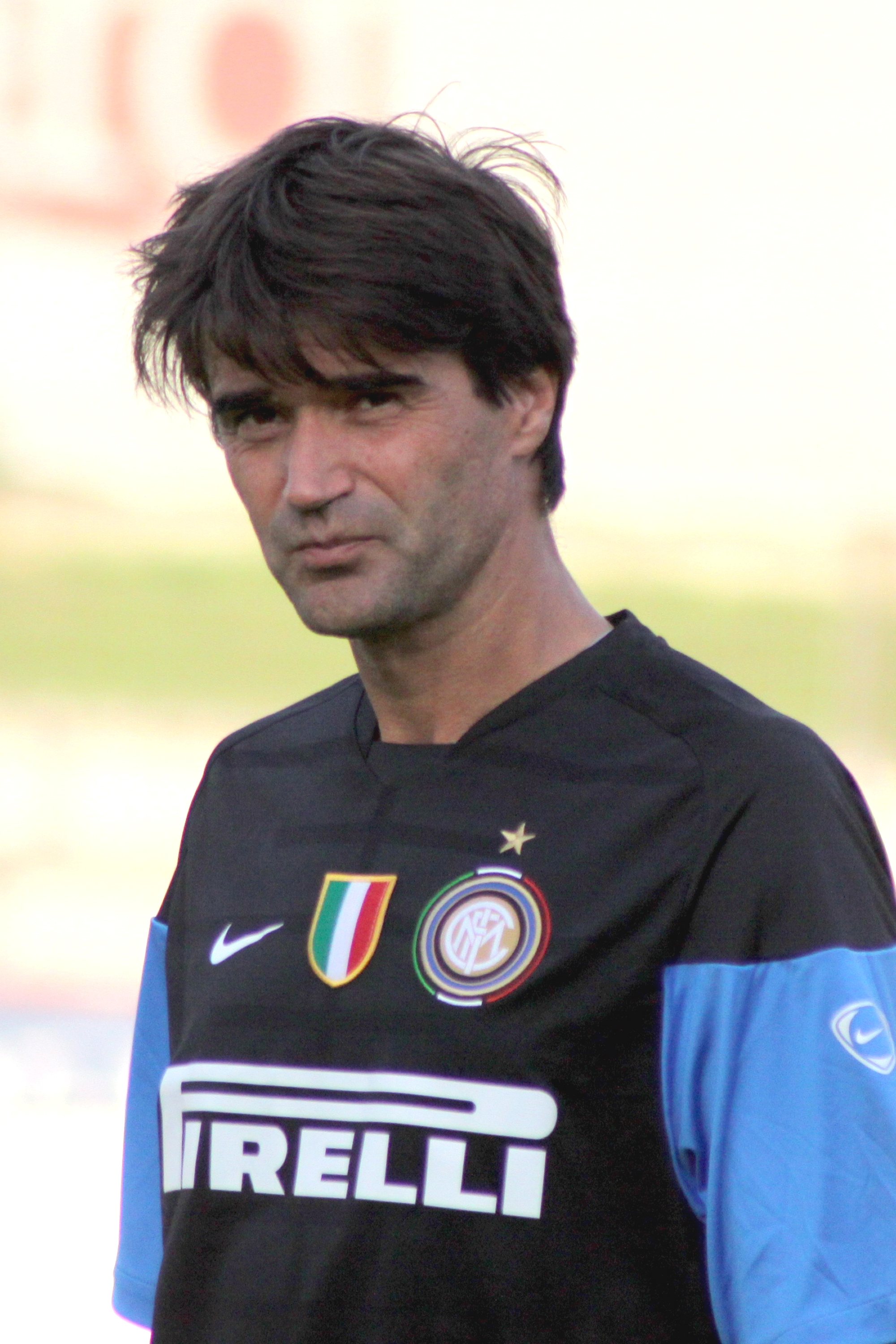
- Bernazzani with Inter Milan

Personal information
- Date of birth: 28 January 1963 (age 63)
- Place of birth: Piacenza, Italy
- Position: Defender

Team information
- Current team: Inter youth team (youth system coordinator)

Senior career*
Years	Team	Apps	(Gls)
1980–1981	Voghera	24	(1)
1981–1986	Inter Milan	19	(0)
1983–1984	→ Pistoiese (loan)	26	(0)
1984–1985	→ Pisa (loan)	23	(0)
1986–1989	Pisa	88	(6)
1989–1992	Reggina	68	(0)
1992–1993	Mantova	33	(0)
Total		281	(7)

Managerial career
- 1998–2000: Piacenza youth teams
- 2000: Piacenza
- 2000–2003: Piacenza youth teams
- 2003–2006: Inter Primavera
- 2006–2008: Inter Allievi Nazionali
- 2008–2012: Inter Milan (assistant)
- 2012–2013: Inter Primavera
- * Club domestic league appearances and goals

Daniele Bernazzani (born 28 January 1963) is an Italian football coach and former professional player. He is the youth system coordinator of Inter Milan.

== Playing career ==
Bernazzani played as a defender for Voghera, Inter Milan, Pistoiese, Pisa, Reggina and Mantova.

== Coaching career ==
After an 18-year career as a player, Bernazzani moved on to coaching, initially with the Piacenza youth team in 1998. That lasted until 2000 when he replaced first-team Piacenza coach Luigi Simoni who had been sacked. Following the conclusion of the 1999–2000 Serie A season, Bernazzani returned to the Piacenza youth teams for three more years (first for Allievi and second and the third season for Primavera). In 2003, he moved on to the Inter "Primavera" U20 youth team, serving as head coach until 2006 and again since 26 March 2012 (as Andrea Stramaccioni promoted to first team), winning 2006 league title. Bernazzani was the coach of "Allievi Nazionali" U17 youth team of Inter from 2006 to 2008, with one league title in 2008.

Bernazzani was the technical assistant of the first team from 2008 to 2012, serving Mourinho, Benítez, Leonardo, Gasperini, and Ranieri.

He was successively appointed youth system coordinator of Inter.
