= Thomas Bachlechner =

Italian footballer

Personal information
- Date of birth: 13 October 1980 (age 46)
- Place of birth: Verona, Italy
- Position: Striker

Senior career*
Years	Team	Apps	(Gls)
1998–2001	Bruneck	70	(50)
2001–2006	Südtirol	106	(30)
2006	Ivrea	7	(0)
2007	Südtirol	16	(4)
2007–2009	Ivrea	63	(18)
2009–2010	Canavese	34	(12)
2010–2011	Valenzana	26	(5)
2011–2013	St Georgen		
- * Club domestic league appearances and goals

Thomas Bachlechner (born 13 October 1980) is an Italian former footballer, the son of Klaus Bachlechner. He played as a forward for the team of his hometown Bruneck, Südtirol and Ivrea.
