= Carlo Pellegrini (17th-century painter) =

Italian painter

Carlo Pellegrini (1605–1649) was an Italian painter of the Baroque period.

He was born in Massa Carrara, Italy and trained in Rome under Bernini. Carlo was active in painting in the Grottoes beneath the Basilica of Basilica of St Peter's; designed the St Bernard mosaic portrait, collaboration with Giovanni Battista Calandra, in the former church; and painted a Conversion of Paul for the church of the Propagande Fide in Rome.

== Note ==
Another painter of the same name (1866–1937) won a gold medal at the 1912 Olympics.
