= Gino Pellegrini (musician) =

American musician and composer

Matteo Casserino
- Born: 1916; Stockton, California
- Died: February 24, 2006 (aged 89–90) Redwood City, California
- Genres: Ballo liscio
- Occupations: Musician, composer
- Instrument: Mandolin
- Years active: c. 1926–2006
- Formerly of: Aurora Mandolin Orchestra

Gino Pellegrini (1916–2006) was an Italian American mandolinist and composer.

Born in Stockton, California in 1916, he lived in Altopascio, Tuscany from age 5 until 17 before returning to California. He played in the Aurora Mandolin Orchestra at the 1939 World's Fair on Treasure Island, San Francisco, one of only a handful of mandolin orchestras at the time. He later re-founded the Aurora Mandolin Orchestra in 1970. He married his wife Josephine in 1994. After he died in Redwood City in 2006, Josephine continued on directing the Orchestra in his memory.
