= Lucas Pellegrini =

French footballer (born 2000)

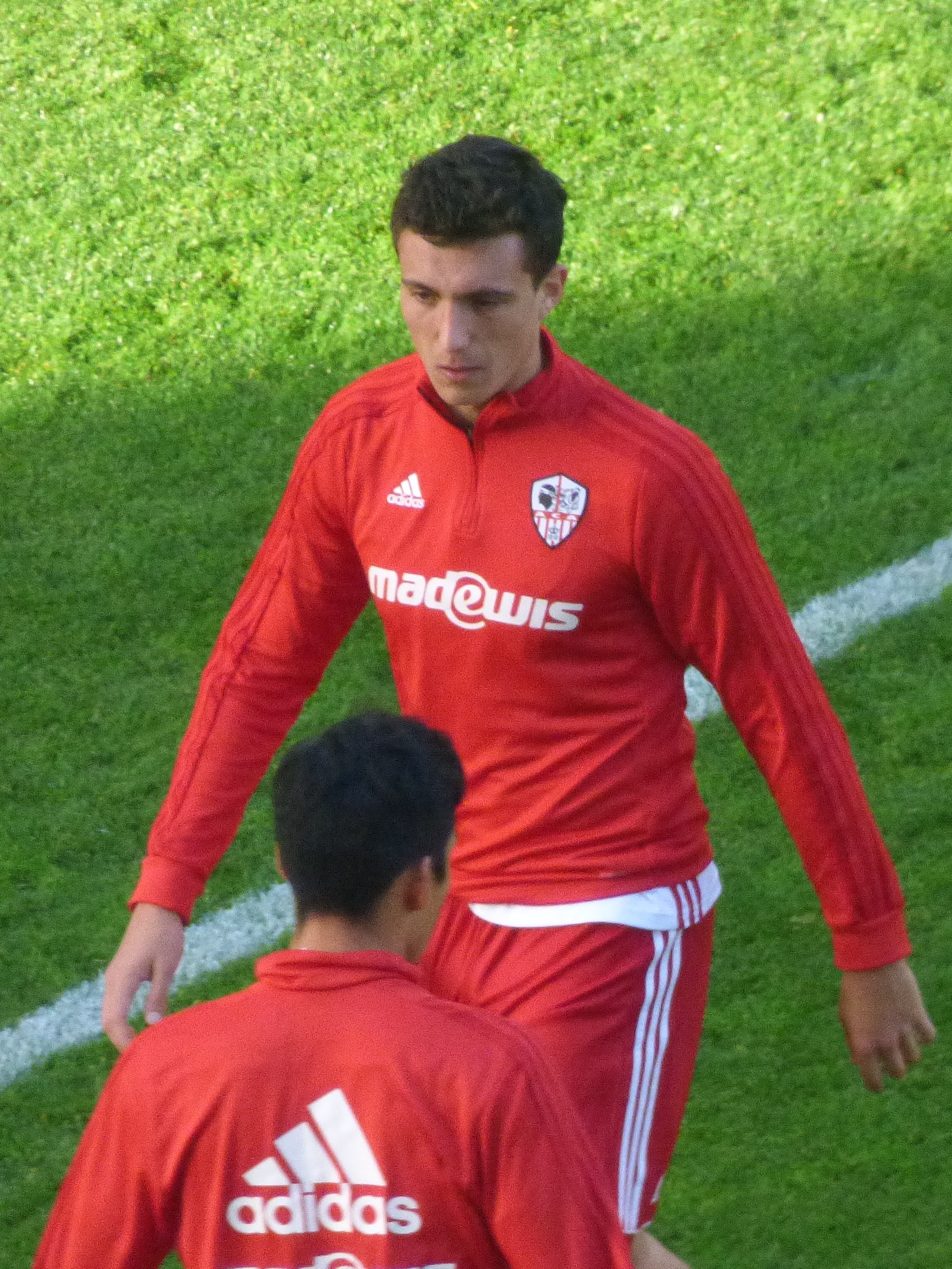
- Pellegrini in 2018

Personal information
- Date of birth: 17 April 2000 (age 26)
- Place of birth: Ajaccio, France
- Height: 1.88 m (6 ft 2 in)
- Positions: Defender; defensive midfielder

Team information
- Current team: Farul Constanța
- Number: 21

Youth career
- –2011: Afa FA
- 2011–2018: Ajaccio

Senior career*
| Years | Team | Apps | (Gls) |
| 2017–2022 | Ajaccio B | 34 | (0) |
| 2018–2022 | Ajaccio | 5 | (0) |
| 2020–2021 | → Le Puy (loan) | 6 | (0) |
| 2021–2022 | → Bastia-Borgo (loan) | 10 | (0) |
| 2022 | Titus Pétange | 12 | (0) |
| 2022–2025 | Nancy | 56 | (1) |
| 2022 | Nancy B | 1 | (0) |
| 2025– | Farul Constanța | 17 | (0) |
- * Club domestic league appearances and goals as of 7 November 2026

Lucas Pellegrini (born 17 April 2000) is a French professional footballer who plays as a defender or a defensive midfielder for Liga I club Farul Constanța.

== Club career ==
Born in Ajaccio, Corsica, he played for AC Ajaccio's reserve team in Championnat National 3 before being called up for the first team's Ligue 2 opener on 27 July 2018. He made his debut in that match as a 61st-minute substitute for Manuel Cabit in a 1–0 home loss to Troyes AC. On 3 September 2019, he signed his first professional contract.

In August 2020, he was loaned to Le Puy Foot 43 Auvergne of the Championnat National 2. A year later, he was lent to FC Bastia-Borgo of the Championnat National.

In July 2022, Pellegrini returned to France and signed a two-year contract with Nancy.

== Career statistics ==
As of match played 7 November 2026

Appearances and goals by club, season and competition
| Club | Season | League | | | National cup (Note: Includes Coupe de France, Luxembourg Cup, Cupa României) | | Europe | | Other | | Total | |
| Club | Season | Division | Apps | Goals | Apps | Goals | Apps | Goals | Apps | Goals | Apps | Goals |
|---|---|---|---|---|---|---|---|---|---|---|---|---|
| Ajaccio B | 2017–18 | Championnat National 3 | 8 | 0 | – | | – | | – | | 8 | 0 |
| Ajaccio B | 2018–19 | Championnat National 3 | 14 | 0 | – | | – | | – | | 14 | 0 |
| Ajaccio B | 2019–20 | Championnat National 3 | 12 | 0 | – | | – | | – | | 12 | 0 |
| Ajaccio B | Total | | 34 | 0 | – | | – | | – | | 34 | 0 |
| Ajaccio | 2018–19 | Ligue 2 | 5 | 0 | 0 | 0 | – | | 1 (Note: Appearance in Coupe de la Ligue) | 0 | 6 | 0 |
| Ajaccio | 2019–20 | Ligue 2 | 0 | 0 | 0 | 0 | – | | 0 | 0 | 1 | 0 |
| Ajaccio | 2021–22 | Ligue 2 | 0 | 0 | – | | – | | – | | 0 | 0 |
| Ajaccio | Total | | 5 | 0 | 0 | 0 | – | | 1 | 0 | 6 | 0 |
| Le Puy (loan) | 2020–21 | Championnat National 2 | 6 | 0 | 4 | 0 | – | | – | | 10 | 0 |
| Bastia-Borgo (loan) | 2021–22 | Championnat National | 10 | 0 | 2 | 0 | – | | – | | 12 | 0 |
| Titus Pétange | 2021–22 | Luxembourg National Division | 12 | 0 | 1 | 0 | – | | – | | 13 | 0 |
| Nancy | 2022–23 | Championnat National | 24 | 0 | 1 | 0 | – | | – | | 25 | 0 |
| Nancy | 2023–24 | Championnat National | 29 | 1 | 1 | 0 | – | | – | | 30 | 1 |
| Nancy | 2024–25 | Championnat National | 3 | 0 | 4 | 0 | – | | – | | 7 | 0 |
| Nancy | Total | | 56 | 1 | 6 | 0 | – | | – | | 62 | 1 |
| Nancy B | 2022–23 | Championnat National 3 | 1 | 0 | – | | – | | – | | 1 | 0 |
| Farul Constanța | 2025–26 | Liga I | 15 | 0 | 3 | 0 | – | | 0 | 0 | 18 | 0 |
| Farul Constanța | 2026–27 | Liga I | 2 | 0 | 0 | 0 | – | | – | | 2 | 0 |
| Farul Constanța | Total | | 17 | 0 | 3 | 0 | – | | 0 | 0 | 20 | 0 |
| Career Total | | | 141 | 1 | 16 | 0 | – | | 1 | 0 | 158 | 1 |

== Honours ==
Nancy

- Championnat National: 2024–25
