= Roberto Bergamaschi (professor) =

American colorectal surgeon

Dr. Roberto Bergamaschi
- Education: MD, PhD, FRCS, FASCRS, FACS
- Known for: Laparoscopic, robotic & conventional surgery for colorectal diseases, intracorporeal laparoscopic colorectal surgery.

Dr. Roberto Bergamaschi is a colorectal surgery specialist, Chief of Colorectal Surgery Department at Westchester Medical Center, previously Professor of Division of Colorectal Surgery at State University of New York in Stony Brook, NY

== Biography ==
Dr. Roberto Bergamaschi was born in Sicily and grew up in Milan, Italy, where he obtained his MD degree. He completed his surgery residency at Strasbourg University in France and at Middlesex Hospital in London, where he also obtained his FRCS ad eundem. He continued his training in colorectal surgery in Trondheim, Norway under professor Helge Myrvold. Bergamaschi completed his PhD in colorectal cancer at Bergen University in Norway under the guidance of professor Odd Søreide. He was there appointed as associate professor, then elevated to full professor and student clerkship director in 1997.

== Career ==
In 2001, Bergamaschi obtained his FASCRS in San Diego and moved to the United States in 2003 to become program director of the MIS fellowship and MIS Center director at Allegheny General Hospital in Pittsburgh, Pennsylvania. as well as professor of surgery at Hahnemann University in Philadelphia, Pennsylvania. After obtaining his FACS in New Orleans in 2004, Bergamaschi accepted in 2005 the Indru Khubchandani Endowed Chair in Colorectal surgery at Penn State University and was appointed in 2006 as associate editor of Diseases of the Colon & Rectum, official journal of the ASCRS.

In 2008, Bergamaschi accepted a position as tenured professor and chief of the Division of Colorectal Surgery at State University of New York in Stony Brook, NY. Dr. Bergamaschi served as Chairman of the Education and Training Committee for the European Association for Endoscopic Surgery (EAES) from 2012 through 2015. Currently, Bergamaschi is editor of the Colorectal Disease journal and past president of the New York Society of Colon & Rectal Surgeons, where he was elected in 2016. In 2017 Dr Bergamaschi accepted a position as Chief of Colorectal Surgery at Westchester Medical Center and tenured professor of surgery at New York Medical College. In 2023 Dr Bergamaschi accepted a position as Chief of Surgical Oncology and Colorectal Surgery at Jacobi Medical Center, New York City Health Hospitals.

== Honors and awards ==
- PhD Dissertation at University of Bergen in Norway “Bergamaschi R. Surgical strategies in the treatment of colorectal cancer. Eur J Surg 1995; 161 Suppl 575:1-22” was included by Commander Colonel Basil A. Pruitt, MD, on November 8, 1995, in the reference file used by the U.S. Army Institute of Surgical Research, 2322 Harney Road, Fort Sam, Houston, TX, USA

== Publications ==
- Book Editor and Author
  - Salky, eds. Intracorporeal Anastomosis - The Definitive Guide for the Minimally Invasive Surgeon, Chapter: Right Colon Resection. Publisher: Springer, 2021. ISBN 978-3-030-57132-0
  - Corman ML, Bergamaschi R, Nicholls J, Fazio V, eds. Corman’s Colon and Rectal Surgery, 6th ed. Publisher: Wolters Kluwer; Philadelphia, 2012 ISBN 978-1-451-11114-9
  - Francis, Fingerhut, Bergamaschi, eds. Training in Minimal Access Surgery Manual. Publisher: Springer-Verlag; London, 2014; ISBN 978-1-4471-6493-7 (Print) 978-1-4471-6494-4
  - Altomare, Pucciani eds. Rectal Prolapse Publisher: Springer Science & Business Media, 2008. ISBN 9788847006843
  - de'Angelis, Di Saverio, Brunetti eds. Emergency Surgical Management of Colorectal Cancer, Chapter Future perspectives in colorectal cancer surgery. Publisher: Springer Science & Business Media, 2019. ISBN 978-3-030-06224-8
  - Sugarbaker, eds. Cancer Treatment and Research - Hepatobiliary Cancer. Publisher: Kluwer Academic Publisher, 1994. ISBN 0-7923-2501-X

- Articles Author
  - Pubmed: Pubmed link to Dr Bergamaschi's publications
