= Edgardo Rebosio =

Italian footballer (1914–?)

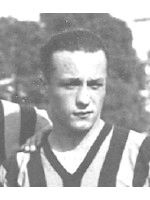
- Rebosio c. 1930–35

Personal information
- Date of birth: 28 June 1914
- Place of birth: Milan, Kingdom of Italy
- Position: Defender

Senior career*
Years	Team	Apps	(Gls)
1930–1935	Ambrosiana-Inter	3	(0)
1933–1934	→ Monza (loan)		
1935–1936	Vigevanesi	5	(0)
1936–1938	Bassano		
1938–1940	Monza		
- * Club domestic league appearances and goals

Edgardo Rebosio (28 June 1914 – ?) was an Italian professional football player.
