= Klaus Bachlechner =

Italian footballer

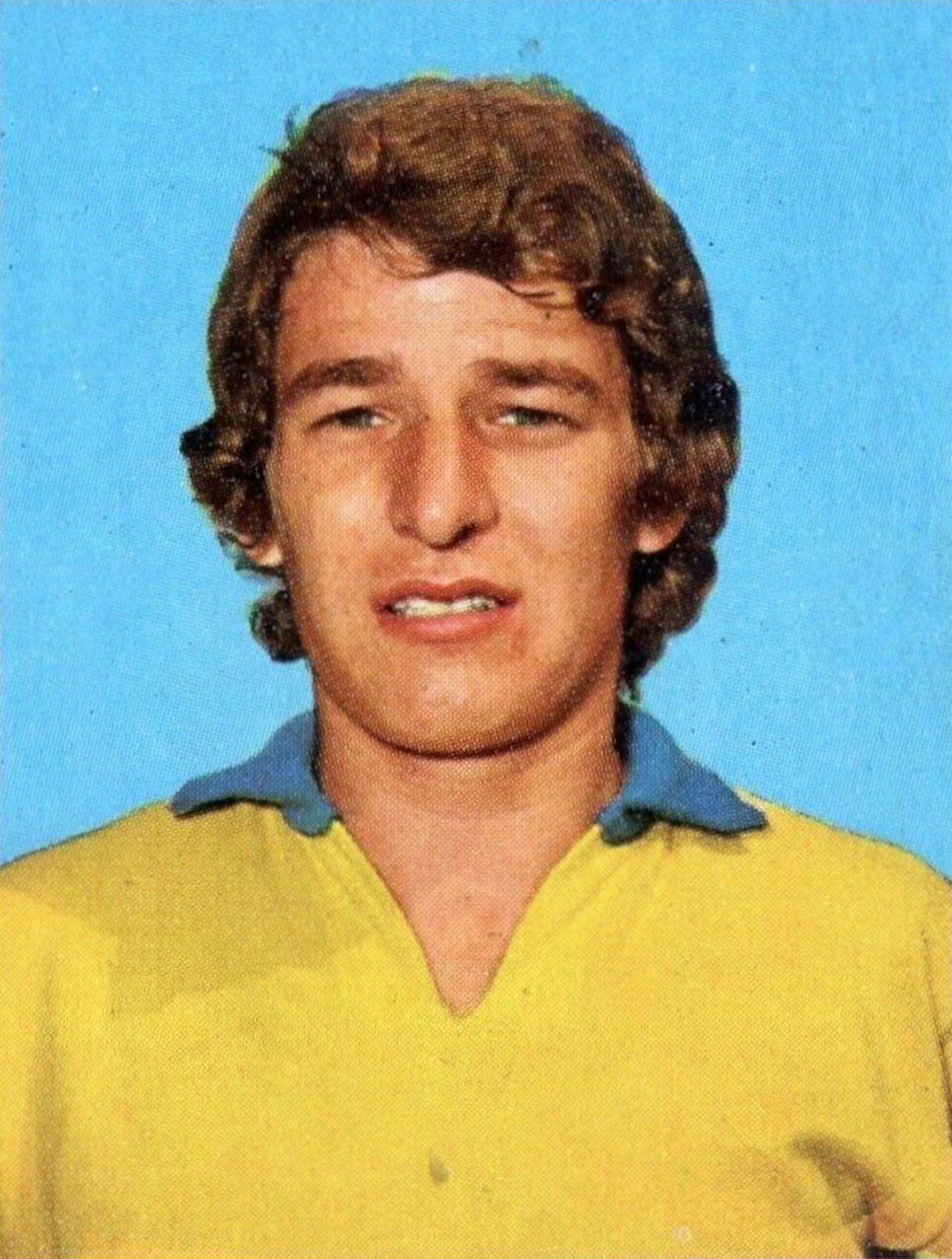
- Bachlechner with Verona in 1973

Personal information
- Date of birth: 27 December 1952 (age 73)
- Place of birth: Bruneck, Italy
- Position: Defender

Youth career
- Hellas Verona

Senior career*
Years	Team	Apps	(Gls)
1971–1978	Hellas Verona		
1971–1972	→ Pisa (loan)		
1974–1975	→ Novara (loan)		
1978–1981	Bologna		
1981–1982	Inter Milan	20	(0)
- * Club domestic league appearances and goals

Klaus Bachlechner (born 27 December 1952) is an Italian former professional footballer who played as a defender for Hellas Verona, Pisa (on loan), Novara (on loan), Bologna and Inter Milan. His son Thomas is also a footballer.
