= Massimo Pellegrini =

Italian footballer (born 1966)

Personal information
- Date of birth: 2 January 1966 (age 60)
- Place of birth: Frascati, Italy
- Height: 1.77 m (5 ft 9 1/2 in)
- Position: Midfielder

Senior career*
Years	Team	Apps	(Gls)
1982–1987	Internazionale	3	(0)
1984–1985	→ Monza (loan)	23	(0)
1986–1987	Cagliari	25	(4)
1987–1989	SPAL	58	(10)
1989	Ancona	6	(0)
1989–1990	Empoli	14	(0)
1990–1998	Modena	128	(21)
1993–1994	→ Fiorenzuola (loan)	15	(0)
1995–1996	→ Novara (loan)	32	(3)
1998–2002	Sassuolo	88	(17)
2002–2003	Poggese	22	(5)
- * Club domestic league appearances and goals

Massimo Pellegrini (born 2 January 1966 in Frascati) is an Italian former professional footballer who played as a midfielder.
