= Roberto Bergamaschi (footballer) =

Italian former footballer (born 1960)

Personal information
- Date of birth: 7 September 1960 (age 66)
- Place of birth: Cassano d'Adda, Italy
- Height: 1.79 m (5 ft 10 1/2 in)
- Position: Midfielder

Senior career*
Years	Team	Apps	(Gls)
1978–1983	Internazionale	25	(2)
1979–1980	→ Pisa (loan)	33	(3)
1980–1981	→ Brescia (loan)	26	(1)
1981–1982	→ Pisa (loan)	36	(3)
1983–1985	Genoa	50	(2)
1985–1987	Cagliari	58	(3)
1987–1989	Brindisi	31	(7)
1989–1991	Reggiana	64	(7)
1991–1993	Spezia	62	(10)
1993–1994	Fanfulla	10	(0)
1994–1995	Spezia	20	(1)
- * Club domestic league appearances and goals

Roberto Bergamaschi (born 7 September 1960) is an Italian former footballer who made more than 400 professional appearances, including 77 in Serie A for Brescia, Inter and Genoa.
