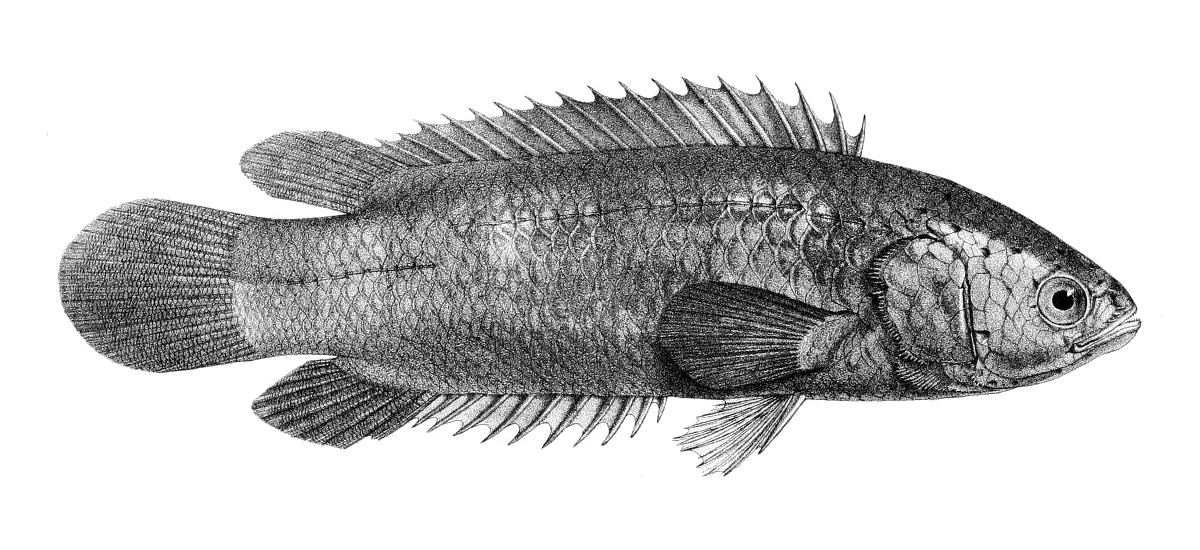
- Anabas testudineus

Scientific classification
- Kingdom: Animalia
- Phylum: Chordata
- Class: Actinopterygii
- Division: Teleostei
- Order: Anabantiformes
- Family: Anabantidae; Bonaparte, 1831

Genera
- see text

= Climbing gourami =

Climbing gourami Temporal range: 26–0 Ma Late Oligocene to Recent

Family of fishes

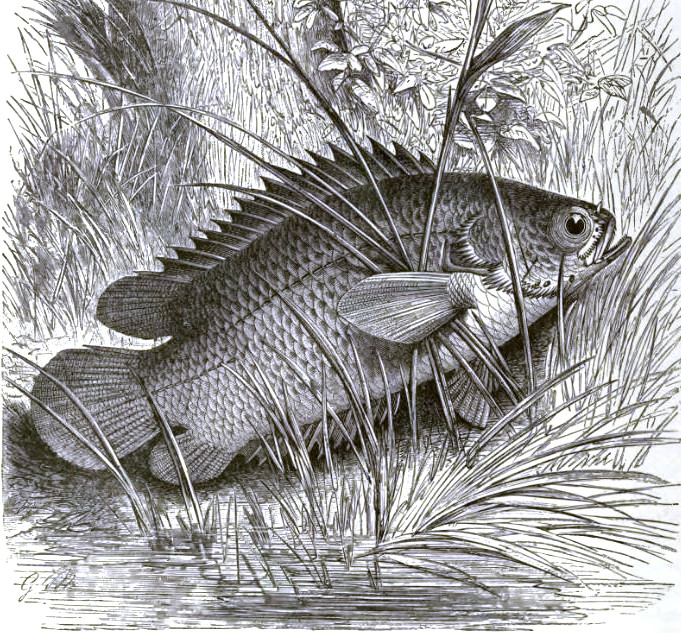
Climbing perch (Anabas testudineus) on land

The Anabantidae are a family of ray-finned fish within the order Anabantiformes commonly called the climbing gouramies or climbing perches. The family includes about 34 species. As labyrinth fishes, they possess a labyrinth organ, a structure in the fish's head which allows it to breathe atmospheric oxygen. Fish of this family are commonly seen gulping at air at the surface of the water. The air is held in a structure called the suprabranchial chamber, where oxygen diffuses into the bloodstream via the respiratory epithelium covering the labyrinth organ. This therefore allows the fish to move small distances across land.

== Genera ==
There are four extant genera within the family Anabantidae:

- Anabas Cloquet, 1816
- Ctenopoma Peters, 1844
- Microctenopoma Norris, 1995
- Sandelia (Castelnau, 1861)

There is also at least one extinct genus known:

- †Eoanabas Wu, Chang, Miao et al, 2016

Of the four genera, Anabas are the only climbing gouramies found in South Asia. They are widely distributed and are found in countries including Pakistan, India, Bangladesh, Sri Lanka, and China. Climbing gouramies have distinct names in numerous South Asian languages. In Tamil, they are பனையேறி கெண்டை (panaieri kendai); in Malayalam, chemballi; in Odia, they are କଉ ମାଛ (kau); in Assamese they are কাৱৈ মাছ (kawoi maas); in Bengali, they are কই মাছ (koi mach).

The remaining three genera are endemic to Africa: Ctenopoma and Microctenopoma are primarily found in the Congo Basin, whereas Sandelia are endemic to the Eastern and Western Capes of South Africa. Anabantidae are primarily freshwater fish and only very rarely are found in brackish water. Parental care is varied; Anabas and Ctenopoma do not tend their eggs, Microctenopoma species produce bubble nests like many other labyrinth fish, and Sandelia lays their eggs on the substrate.

Climbing gouramis are so named due to their ability to "climb" out of water and "walk" short distances. Even though it has not been reliably observed, some authors have mentioned about them having a tree climbing ability. Their method of terrestrial locomotion uses the gill plates as supports, and the fish pushes itself using its fins and tail.
