= Daniela =

Female given name

Daniela is a feminine given name.

Daniela, Daniella or Danniella may refer to:

== People ==
=== Daniela ===
- Daniela Anahí Bessia (born 1989), Italian-Argentinian singer
- Daniela Akerblom (born 1969), Canadian actress
- Daniela Albizu (1936-2015), Basque-speaking teacher, writer, and councillor
- Daniela (footballer) (born Daniela Alves Lima, 1984), Brazilian football player
- Daniela Anschütz-Thoms (born 1974), German speed skater
- Daniela Avanzini (born 2004), American singer and dancer
- Daniela Bártová (born 1974), Czech pole vaulter
- Daniela Bianchi (born 1942), Italian actress
- Daniela Bobadilla (born 1993), Canadian actress
- Daniela Calvetti, Italian-American mathematician
- Daniela Castro (born 1969), Mexican actress and singer
- Daniela Ceccarelli (born 1975), Italian alpine skier
- Daniela Clynes, English vocalist
- Daniela Cosío (born 1986), Mexican model
- Daniela Dahn (born 1949), German writer
- Daniela Del Din (born 1969), Sammarinese professional sport shooter
- Daniela Denby-Ashe (born 1978), English actress
- Daniela Dondi (born 1962), Italian politician
- Daniela Donno (born 1960), Italian politician
- Daniela Ehlers (born 1992), German politician
- Daniela Esposito, Italian ten-pin bowler
- Daniela Filipiová (born 1957), Czech politician
- Daniela Gmeinbauer (born 1965), Austrian politician
- Daniela Gubler (born 1994), Swiss long jumper
- Daniela Hantuchová (born 1983), Slovak tennis player
- Dani Karlsson, Swedish beauty pageant titleholder and model
- Daniela Katzenberger (born 1986), German reality TV personality, singer and model
- Daniela Klemenschits (1982–2008), Austrian tennis player
- Daniela Klette (born 1958), German left-wing militant
- Daniela Kolářová (born 1946), Czech actress
- Daniela Lima (born 1985), Brazilian journalist
- Daniela Mărănducă (born 1976), Romanian gymnast
- Daniela Melchior (born 1996), Portuguese actress
- Daniela Mercury (born 1965), Brazilian singer
- Daniela Owusu (born 2004), Finnish public figure
- Daniela Pejšová (born 2002), Czech ice hockey player
- Daniela Peštová (born 1970), Czech model
- Daniela Rocca (1937–1995), Italian actress
- Daniela Romo (born 1959), Mexican actress and singer
- Daniela Ruah (born 1983), American-Portuguese actress
- Daniela L. Rus, Romanian-American roboticist and computer scientist
- Daniela Samulski (1984–2018), German swimmer
- Daniela Sanzone, Italian journalist
- Daniela Seel (born 1974), German poet, translator, editor and publisher
- Daniela Silivaș (born 1972), Romanian gymnast
- Daniela Simmons (born 1959), Swiss singer
- Daniela Stauch (born 1989), German politician
- Daniela Urzi (born 1975), Argentine model
- Daniela Varela, Portuguese singer
- Daniela Ziegler (born 1948), German actress and singer

=== Daniella ===
- Daniella Alonso, American actress and fashion model
- Daniella Álvarez (born 1988), Colombian model and beauty pageant titleholder
- Daniella Busk (born 1993), Swedish sprinter
- Daniella Cicarelli (born 1978), Brazilian model and television host
- Daniella Dooling (born 1967), American artist
- Daniella Dragojevic (born 1989), Danish handball player
- Daniella Evangelista (born 1982), Canadian actress and model
- Daniella Goldfarb, French–born Israeli chemist
- Daniella Guzman (born 1982), American journalist
- Daniella Hill (born 1991), American track and field athlete
- Daniella Jeflea (born 1987), Australian tennis player
- Daniella Kertesz (born 1989), Israeli actress
- Daniella Karagach (born 1992), American dancer
- Daniella Kolodny, Israeli rabbi
- Daniella Kromm (born 2004), German rhythmic gymnast
- Daniella Levine Cava (born 1955), American lawyer, politician and social worker
- Daniella Lugassy (born 1982), Israeli operatic soprano
- Daniella Marques (born 1979), Brazilian economist
- Daniella Mastricchio (born 1987), Argentine actress and singer
- Daniella Melo (born 1998), American powerlifter
- Daniella Monet (born 1989), American actress and singer
- Daniella Ohad (born 1961), American-Israeli design historian, educator and writer
- Daniella Okeke, Nigerian actress
- Daniella Pavicic, Croatian–Canadian singer and songwriter
- Daniella Pellegrini (born 1982), South African television presenter and voice actress
- Daniella Perez (1970–1992), Brazilian actress and dancer
- Daniella Perkins (born 2000), American actress
- Daniella Pineda (born 1987), American actress
- Daniella Rabbani (born 1984), American singer and voice actress
- Daniella Rahme (born 1990), Lebanese–Australian actress and television presenter
- Daniella Ribeiro (born 1972), Brazilian politician
- Daniella Rosas (born 2002), Peruvian surfer
- Daniella Rubinovitz, Dutch contemporary artist
- Daniella Sarahyba (born 1984), Brazilian model
- Daniella Shevel, South African footwear designer
- Daniella Smith (born 1972), New Zealand boxer
- Daniella Tilbury, Gibraltarian academic and educator
- Daniella Tobar, Chilean actress
- Daniella Vitale, American businesswoman
- Daniella Walcott (born 1991), Trinidadian model and painter
- Daniella Wang (born 1989), Chinese actress and fashion model
- Daniella Weiss (born 1945), Israeli far-right activist and politician

=== Danniella ===
- Danniella Westbrook (born 1973), English actress

== Fictional characters ==
- the title character of Daniela (1976 TV series), a Venezuelan telenovela
- Daniela Gamboa, title character of Daniela (2002 TV series), an American-Mexican Spanish-language telenovela
- Daniela Mondragon-Bartolome, from the Filipino drama series Kadenang Ginto

== See also ==
- Danielle
