= Calvetti =

Calvetti is an Italian surname. Notable people with this name include:

- Daniela Calvetti, Italian-American mathematician
- Diego Calvetti, songwriter; see Category:Songs written by Diego Calvetti
- Joe Calvetti, American gymnast for Illinois Fighting Illini men's gymnastics, won 1948 NCAA individual high bar national championship
- María Calvetti, Uruguayan shot putter, silver medalist at 1978 South American Youth Championships in Athletics
- Paola Calvetti (born 1958), Italian novelist and journalist
