= The Art of Joy (TV series) =

2025 drama television miniseries

- Italian promotional poster
- Italian: L'arte della gioia
- Genre: Drama
- Based on: The Art of Joy by Goliarda Sapienza
- Written by: Valeria Golino; Francesca Marciano; Valia Santella; Luca Infascelli; Stefano Sardo
- Directed by: Valeria Golino; Nicolangelo Gelormini
- Starring: Tecla Insolia; Jasmine Trinca; Valeria Bruni Tedeschi; Guido Caprino
- Composer: Tóti Guðnason
- Countries of origin: Italy; United Kingdom
- Original language: Italian
- No. of episodes: 6

Production
- Executive producers: Sonia Rovai; Erica Negri; Viola Prestieri; Valeria Golino; Gennaro Formisano; Nils Hartmann
- Producers: Emma Esposito; Davide Bertoni; Viola Prestieri
- Cinematography: Fabio Cianchetti
- Editor: Giogiò Franchini
- Running time: 47–62 minutes
- Production companies: Sky Studios; HT Film

Original release
- Network: Sky Atlantic
- Release: 28 February – 14 March 2025

The Art of Joy (Italian: L'arte della gioia) is a 2025 six-part television drama miniseries based on the 1998 novel of the same name by Goliarda Sapienza. It aired on Sky Atlantic from 28 February to 14 March 2025.

== Cast ==
- Tecla Insolia as Modesta Spataro
  - Viviana Mocciaro as young Modesta
- Jasmine Trinca as Mother Leonora
- Antonio De Matteo as father
- Alice Canzonieri as mother
- Erika Bonura as Tina
- Mariella Lo Sardo as Sister Costanza
- Giovanni Calcagno as Mimmo
- Alessia Debandi as Ilaria
- Paola Pace as Sister Teresa
- Giuseppe Spata as Rocco
- Lollo Franco as Antonio
- Valeria Bruni Tedeschi as Gaia Brandiforti
- Guido Caprino as Carmine
- Alma Noce as Beatrice Brandiforti
- Eleonora De Luca as Argentovivo
- Vincenzo De Michele as Pietro

== Episodes ==
| No. in season | Title | Duration | Original release date |
|---|---|---|---|
| 1 | "Episode 1" | 59 min | 28 February 2025 |
| 2 | "Episode 2" | 47 min | 28 February 2025 |
| 3 | "Episode 3" | 60 min | 7 March 2025 |
| 4 | "Episode 4" | 59 min | 7 March 2025 |
| 5 | "Episode 5" | 55 min | 14 March 2025 |
| 6 | "Episode 6" | 62 min | 14 March 2025 |

== Production ==
The series was shot in Catania, Cefalù, and Bagheria. The interiors of the convent were shot at Castello Orsini-Odescalchi in Bracciano, while the exteriors were shot at a former convent near Corleone.

== Release ==
The first episode of the series premiered in the Special Screenings section of the 2024 Cannes Film Festival. The miniseries was released in Italian cinemas in two parts, on 30 May and 13 June 2024; its theatrical release allowed it to be eligible for the David di Donatello Awards in its film categories.

== Awards and nominations ==
| Award | Year | Category | Recipient(s) | Result | Ref. |
|---|---|---|---|---|---|
| David di Donatello | 2025 | Best Film | The Art of Joy | Nominated | |
| David di Donatello | 2025 | Best Director | Valeria Golino | Nominated | |
| David di Donatello | 2025 | Best Adapted Screenplay | Valeria Golino, Francesca Marciano, Valia Santella, Luca Infascelli, Stefano Sardo | Won | |
| David di Donatello | 2025 | Best Actress | Tecla Insolia | Won | |
| David di Donatello | 2025 | Best Supporting Actress | Valeria Bruni Tedeschi | Won | |
| David di Donatello | 2025 | Best Supporting Actress | Jasmine Trinca | Nominated | |
| David di Donatello | 2025 | Best Supporting Actor | Guido Caprino | Nominated | |
| David di Donatello | 2025 | Best Casting | Francesco Vedovati, Anna Maria Sambucco, Massimo Appolloni | Nominated | |
| David di Donatello | 2025 | Best Cinematography | Fabio Cianchetti | Nominated | |
| David di Donatello | 2025 | Best Production Design | Luca Merlini, Giulietta Rimoldi | Nominated | |
| David di Donatello | 2025 | Best Costumes | Maria Rita Barbera | Nominated | |
| David di Donatello | 2025 | Best Make-up | Maurizio Fazzini | Nominated | |
| David di Donatello | 2025 | Best Editing | Giogiò Franchini | Nominated | |
| David di Donatello | 2025 | Best Visual Effects | Francesco Niolu, Rodolfo Migliari | Nominated | |
