= War correspondents in Syria =

War correspondents in Syria refers to the situation experienced by war correspondents during the Syrian Civil War starting in 2011.

== Death of foreign correspondents and civilians ==
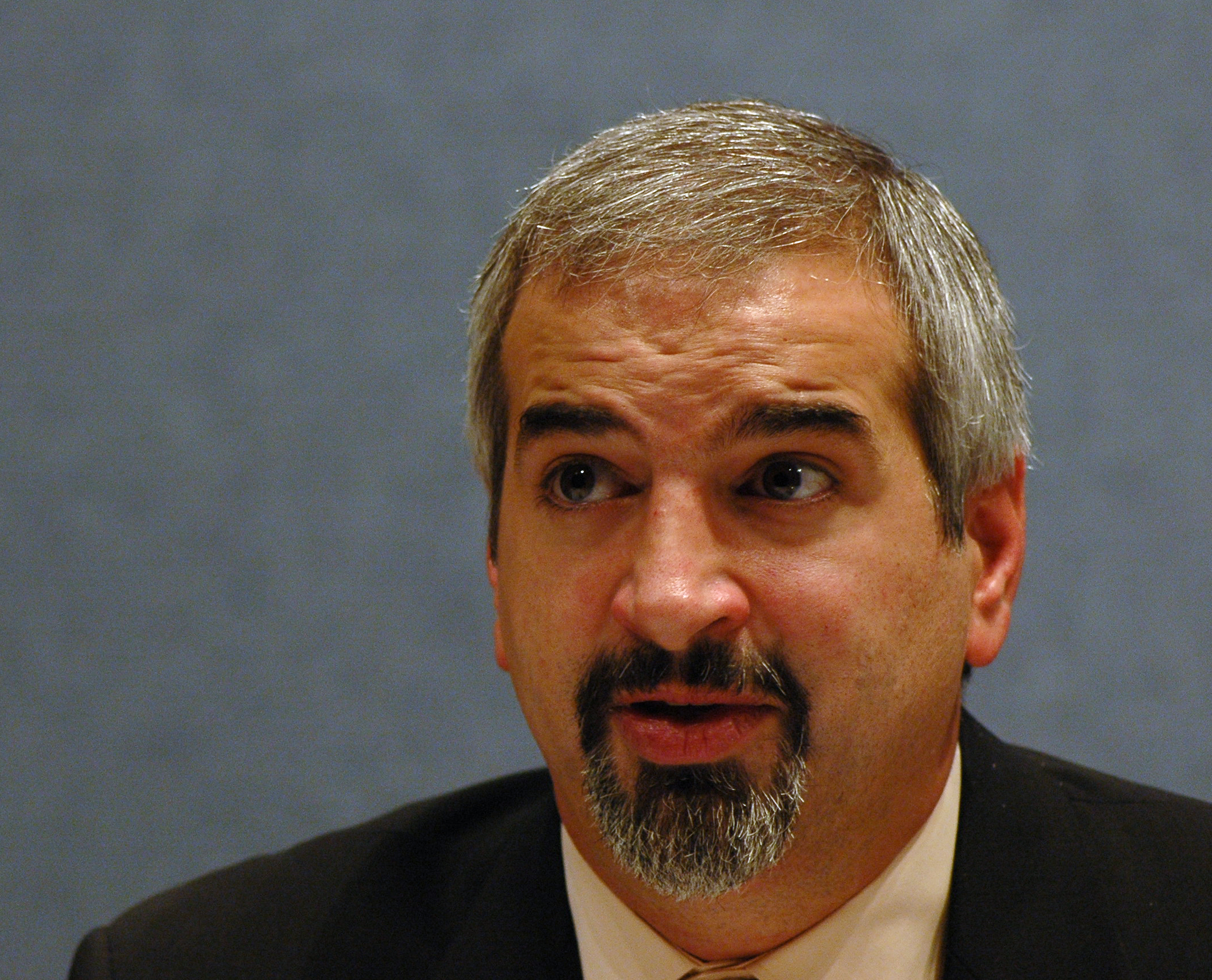
Anthony Shadid speaking at a conference

As of March 2013, it is estimated that 70,000 or more civilians had been killed and, according to the Doha Centre for Media Freedom and Syrian Journalists Association, 278 journalists were killed since the beginning of the civil war, between 2011 and 2015.

In between the different publishing dates, there have been accumulating reports of similar journalist deaths ranging from roughly 60-300 deaths in correspondents. The Committee to Protect Journalists in 2012 provided statistics stating that the Syrian Civil War has one of the largest recorded numbers of deaths when it comes to the number of war journalists who died abroad. Most of these deaths took place in Syria or adjacent borders and countries where the correspondents did not have any direct protection or were in travel.

In 2013, the number of war journalists kidnapped, killed and threatened reached its highest figure and since then the numbers have decreased. According to Jason Stern, from the Committee to Protect Journalists, this declining number of deaths is due to there are lees journalists in the country.

One of the most famous cases was the death of the New York Times´ correspondent, the American Anthony Shadid, who died in February 2012 in Damascus. Another significant death was the British Marie Colvin, correspondent for The Sunday Times, who died reporting the siege of Homs together with the French photographer Rémi Ochlik.

== Value of journalism in Syria ==
Francesca Borri has been reporting from Syria since 2012 and has published two books on the dynamics of the war within the country and within refugee communities as a result. Her opinions on the culture that is perceived by some as a cause of war in these times of turmoil further supports the importance of journalistic insight by these correspondents. According to her, the Arab culture is more "advanced" than Western culture in some aspects; for example, the community is more important than an individual and those involved have a relevance thanks to the influence of friends or family.

== See also ==
- List of journalists killed during the Syrian Civil War
