= Tecla Insolia =

Italian singer and actress (born 2004)

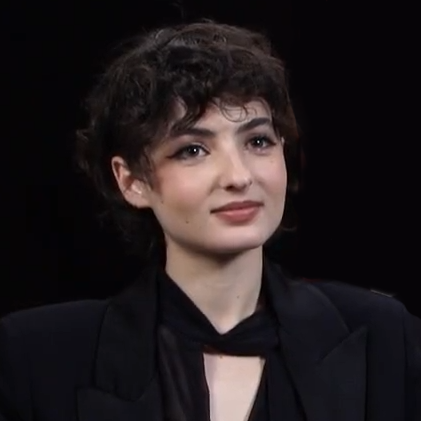
- Insolia in 2025
- Born: Tecla Marianna Insolia; 13 January 2004 (age 22); Varese, Lombardy, Italy
- Occupations: Actress; singer
- Years active: 2016–present
- Musical career
- Genres: Pop
- Labels: Rusty Records; Baraonda; Universal Music Group
- Website: Tecla Insolia on Instagram

Tecla Marianna Insolia (born 13 January 2004) is an Italian actress and singer. She is best known for her role as Modesta Spataro in the 2025 six-part television drama The Art of Joy (L'arte della gioia), adapted from the 1998 novel of the same name by Goliarda Sapienza.

== Early life and education ==
Tecla Marianna Insolia was born on January 13, 2004, in Varese, Lombardy, Italy. She later moved to Piombino, Tuscany, where, at the age of five, she began singing lessons with Gianni Gepi at the Woodstock Academy School of Music. At the age of ten, she began performing regularly, developing an interest in both singing and acting. She trained with the cultural association Le Muse, founded by Gianna Martorella, where she received guidance from several entertainment professionals, including conductor Beppe Vessicchio, singer Giò Di Tonno, and actor Gianmarco Tognazzi.

== Career ==
Insolia began her television career by participating in various Italian programs, including Pequeños Gigantes (2016) and L'allieva (2018).

On March 15, 2019, she won the second edition of RAI's talent show Sanremo Young, which secured her a spot in the Sanremo Music Festival 2020. She competed in the "Newcomers" category with the song "8 marzo", finishing second to Leo Gassmann. At the festival, she received the Enzo Jannacci Award for Best Performance and the Lucio Dalla Press, Radio, Television, & Web Award.

In 2020, she starred in the Rai 1 thriller series Vite in fuga and portrayed singer Nada in the television biopic La bambina che non voleva cantare. On 22 July 2021, she released the single "Ti amo ma" in collaboration with Italian rapper Alfa. In 2022, she appeared in the Rai series 5 minuti prima, directed by Duccio Chiarini, and released the single "Oro", co-written with singer Noemi.

In 2024, she played the lead role in the series The Art of Joy, directed by Valeria Golino, and had a supporting role in Familia, a film by Francesco Costabile. For these performances, she received two nominations at the 2025 David di Donatello Awards, winning Best Actress for The Art of Joy. She was also awarded the Italian Breakthrough prize.

== Discography ==
=== Singles ===
Single	Year	Peak chart positions	Album
Single	Year	ITA	Album
"8 marzo"	2019	89	Non-album singles
"L'urlo di Munch"	2021	—	Non-album singles
"Ti amo ma" (featuring Alfa)	2021	—	Non-album singles
"Faccio un casino" (featuring Alfa)	2021	—	Non-album singles
"Oro"	2022	—	Non-album singles
"—" denotes an item that did not chart in that country.

== Filmography ==
=== Film ===
Year	Title	Role	Notes
2021	Addio al nubilato	Giulia De Martino	
2024	Familia	Giulia	Supporting role
2024	L'albero	Bianca	Main role
2025	Primavera	Cecilia	Main role
2025	Amata	Nunzia	Supporting role
2026	Hoppers	Mabel Tanaka (voice)	Italian dub
2026	Idda		

=== Television ===
Year	Title	Role	Notes
2018	L'allieva	Young girl	Season 2, Episode 8
2020	Vite in fuga	Matilde Marasco/Ilaria Caruana	Main role; 12 episodes
2021	La bambina che non voleva cantare	Nada	Main role; Documentary/Drama
2021	Tutta colpa della fata Morgana	Maria	Supporting role; Romance/Comedy
2022	5 minuti prima	Nina	Main role; 8 episodes
2025	The Art of Joy	Modesta Spataro	Main role; 6 episodes

== Awards and nominations ==
Award	Year	Category	Work	Result	Ref.
Festival di Sanremo	2020	Lucio Dalla Jury Award	"8 marzo"	Won	
Festival di Sanremo	2020	Best Performance Award	"8 marzo"	Won	
David di Donatello	2025	David Rivelazioni italiane	Herself	Won	
David di Donatello	2025	Best Actress	L'arte della gioia	Won	
David di Donatello	2025	Best Supporting Actress	Familia	Nominated	
Nastri d'argento - Grandi Serie	2025	Best Actress (Lead)	L'arte della gioia	Won	
