= Urzi =

Urzi (Spanish: [ˈuɾθi]) or Urzì (Italian: [urˈtsi]) is a surname. Notable people with the surname include:

- Agustín Urzi (born 2000), Argentinian footballer
- Daniela Urzi (born 1975), Argentinian model
- Saro Urzì (1913–1979), Italian actor
