= Anne Milano Appel =

American translator

Anne Milano Appel is an American translator of Italian literature and language teacher. She obtained a doctorate in Romance languages from Rutgers University in 1970. She has translated, among others, works by Claudio Magris, Paolo Giordano, Giovanni Arpino and Goliarda Sapienza. She was awarded the John Florio Prize in 2012 for her translation of Arpino's Scent of a Woman. She is also working on English translations of Giordano's Like Family (December 2015, Pamela Dorman Books/Viking), Syrian Dust by Francesca Borri (March 2016, Seven Stories Press) and Don't Tell Me You're Afraid by Giuseppe Catozzella (August 2016, Penguin Press).

== List of translations ==
- Aline Cendon, Loris Dilena, Venice. Its Wood, Andrea Montagnani, ed. Nonfiction. Ponzano: Edizioni Grafiche Vianello srl/Vianello Libri, 2005.
- Andrea Canobbio, Three Light-Years. (Original title: Tre anni luce, Feltrinelli, 2013). Farrar Straus & Giroux, 2014. British edition forthcoming from MacLehose Press, December 2015.
- Andrea Moro, The Secret of Pietramala. (Original title: Il segreto di Pietramala, La Nave di Teseo, 2018). La Nave di Teseo, 2023.
- Claudio Magris, Blindly. Yale University Press, 2012. (Originally published by Hamish Hamilton/Penguin Canada, 2010.)
- Claudio Magris, Non luogo a procedere (Garzanti, 2015). In progress for Yale University Press.
- Claudio Magris. Blindly. (Original title: Alla cieca, Garzanti, 2005). Hamish Hamilton/Penguin Canada, 2010.
- Davide Lucchetta, A Heart of Stars and Stripes. A Photographic Journey through the United States. (Original title: USA – Un cuore a stelle e strisce. Viaggio fotografico negli Stati Uniti). Nonfiction. Ponzano: Edizioni Grafiche Vianello srl/Vianello Libri, 2005.
- Elena Kostioukovitch, Why Italians Love to Talk About Food. Non-fiction with Forewords by Umberto Eco and Carol Field. (Original title: Perché agli italiani piace parlare del cibo, Sperling & Kupfer, 2006). Farrar Straus & Giroux, 2009.
- Fiamma Nirenstein, Terror: The New Anti-Semitism and the War Against the West. (Original title: L'Abbandono: Come l'Occidente ha tradito gli ebrei, Rizzoli, 2002). Nonfiction. Smith and Kraus Publishers, Hanover, NH, 2005.
- Francesca Borri, Syrian Dust: Reporting from the Heart of the War (Original title: La Guerra Dentro, Bompiani, 2014. Forthcoming March 2016 from Seven Stories Press.
- Giovanni Arpino. Scent of a Woman. (Original title: Il buio e il miele, Baldini Castoldi Dalai, Milan, 2009. Orig. pub. 1969). Penguin UK, 2011.
- Giulio Leoni, The Mosaic Crimes. (Original title: I delitti del mosaico, Mondadori, 2005). Fiction. Harcourt (US), 2007. And as The Third Heaven Conspiracy, Harvill Secker (UK), 2007. Reprint edition published by Houghton Mifflin Harcourt, 2008.
- Giuseppe Catozzella, Don't Tell Me You're Afraid (Non dirmi che hai paura, Feltrinelli, 2014) Forthcoming, August 2016 for The Penguin Press.
- Goliarda Sapienza, The Art of Joy. (Original title: L’arte della gioia, Stampa Alternativa, 1998, and Einaudi, 2008). Penguin UK and Farrar Straus & Giroux, 2013.
- Marco Franzoso, The Indigo Child (Original title: Il bambino indaco, Einaudi, 2012). Amazon e-book, 2015.
- Maurizio De Giovanni, I Will Have Vengeance: The Winter of Commissario Ricciardi (Original title: Il senso del dolore: L’inverno del commissario Ricciardi, Fandango Libri, 2007). Hersilia Press, 2012.
- Orio Frassetto, Andrea Belieni, Treviso: The Places Where Art Lives On, Andrea Montagnani, ed.,. Nonfiction. Ponzano: Edizioni Grafiche Vianello srl/Vianello Libri, 2005.
- Paola Calvetti, PO Box Love, a novel. (Original title: Noi due come un romanzo, Mondadori, 2009). St. Martin’s Press, 2012.
- Paolo Giordano, Like Family. (Original title: Il nero e l'argento, Einaudi, 2014). Forthcoming, December 2015. Pamela Dorman Books/Viking/Penguin.
- Paolo Giordano, The Human Body. (Original title: Il corpo umano, Mondadori, 2012). Pamela Dorman Books/Viking/Penguin, 2014.
- Primo Levi, Stories and Essays (Racconti e saggi). In The Complete Works of Primo Levi, Ann Goldstein, project editor, Robert Weil, executive editor. W. W. Norton, 2015.
- Roberto Saviano, My Italians. (Original title: Vieni via con me, Feltrinelli, 2011). In progress for Penguin UK.
- Sara Ventura, Michele Zanetti, Caorle: the Light All Around, Andrea Montagnani, ed. Nonfiction. Ponzano: Edizioni Grafiche Vianello srl/Vianello Libri, 2005.
- Stefano Bortolussi, Head Above Water, a novel. (Original title: Fuor d’acqua.) San Francisco: City Lights Press, 2003.
- Vito Bruschini, The Prince. (Original title: The Father. Il padrino dei padrini, Newton Compton Editori, 2009). Atria Books, Simon & Schuster, 2015.

== Pending or unpublished ==
- Angelo Cannavacciuolo, excerpt from When Things Happen, a novel. (Original title: Le cose accadono, Milan: Cairo Editore, 2008).
- Annalisa Monfreda, feature article about Arberia entitled “The Freedom Song of the Arberesh” (“Il Canto Libero degli Arberesh”), 2006.
- Annalisa Monfreda, feature article about Burkina Faso entitled “Story of the Man Who Stopped the Desert” (“Storia dell’Uomo che Fermo` il Deserto”), 2007.
- Annalisa Monfreda, feature article about Istanbul entitled “Istanbul: The Double Life of the Mistress of the Bosphorus” (“Istanbul: La doppia vita della signora del Bosforo"), 2007.
- Annalisa Monfreda, feature article about Kurdistan entitled “Kurdistan: When Peshmerga go into real estate” (“Kurdistan: Quando i peshmerga fanno gli immobiliaristi”), 2007.
- Annalisa Monfreda, feature article about the Iranian cinema industry entitled “Takes on Freedom” (“Sequenze di liberta`”), 2007.
- Carlo Fornari. Frederick II and Saint Francis (original title: Federico II e San Francesco, Edizioni all'Insegna del Veltro, Parma, 2005).
- Carlo Lucarelli, “The Dark Side of the Heart”, a short story. (Original title: “Il lato sinistro del cuore”.) Original publication in the collection Vorrei essere il pilota di uno Zero (Faenza: Mobydick, 1994) and in Il lato sinistro del cuore. (Quasi) Tutti i racconti (Milan: Einaudi, Economici, 2003). Translated for promotional purposes for Einaudi (2003).
- Caterina Bonvicini, excerpt from The Equilibrium of Sharks, a novel. (Original title: L’equilibrio degli squali, Milan: Garzanti, 2008).
- Enrico Cernigoi, Political Choices and National Identity: At the Eastern Borders of Italy from the Resistance to the Cold War, dissertation for the University of Portsmouth, Portsmouth, Hampshire, England. (Original title: Scelte politiche e identità nazionale. Ai confini orientali d'Italia dalla Resistenza alla guerra fredda. Udine, Gaspari Editore, 2006.)
- Enzo Fontana, excerpts from Diary of a Boy Who Was Cloned, a novel. (Original title: Diario di un ragazzo clonato.) Original publication: Milan: Àncora, 2002. Translated for promotional purposes for Àncora (2002).
- Enzo Fontana, excerpts from The New Fire, a novel. (Original title: Il fuoco nuovo, Casa Editrice Marietti in 2006).
- Enzo Fontana, Tra la perduta gente, a novel. Original publication: Milan: Mondadori, 1996.
- Fabiano Alborghetti. Poems from the volume The Opposite Shore (original title: L’opposta riva, LietoColle, 2006). For a reading at the Other Words: 6th Annual International Poetry Festival in San Francisco, October 12, 2008, representing Switzerland.
- Gaspare Bitetto, Logos, a volume of poetry. January 2005.
- Isabella Messina, The Monster, a volume of short stories.
- John Kleiner, “Il fallimento dei maestri: Dante, Virgilio e le ironie dell’istruzione”. (Original title: “On Failing One’s Teachers: Dante, Virgil and the Ironies of Instruction”.) Original publication in Sparks and Seeds: Medieval Literature and its Afterlife, (Belgium: Brepols Publishers, 2000).
- Lorenzo Costa, The Greater Evil, a novella.
- Marina Argenziano, Antonietta Pirandello née Portolano. Fiction. (Original title: Antonietta Pirandello nata Portolano (Dialogo mancato con Luigi. Rome: Editrice Irradiazioni, 2001).
- Mario Desiati, “The Doctor Who Craved Peace and Quiet”, a short story. (Original title: “Il medico del quieto vivere”).
- Marisa Madieri, excerpt from Aqua-green. (Original title: Verde Acqua, Einaudi, 1987). Publishing rights are on submission via agent Matthew McLean at The Wylie Agency.
- Paolo Gallina, excerpt from One Hundred Cows, an unpublished novel set in Southern Sudan (Original title: Cento vacche).
- Rosella Postorino, excerpt from The Summer We Fell From Grace, a novel. (Original title: L’estate che perdemmo dio, Einaudi Editore, 2009).
- Silvano Agosti, excerpts from the novel Il semplice oblio (Rome: Edizioni “L’Immagine”, 2003).
- Valentina Reginelli, “Like the Sea”, a short story. (Original title: “Come il mare”) From the volume Gli Intemperanti, Giulia Belloni, ed. (Padua: Meridiano Zero, 2004).
