= Andrea Canobbio =

Italian writer and translator

Andrea Canobbio (born Turin, 1962) is an Italian writer and translator. A graduate of the University of Turin, he made his literary debut in 1986. He has written several books, but is best known abroad for his novel Tre anni luce. An English translation by Anne Milano Appel under the title Three Light-Years was widely praised upon publication. He has received a number of literary prizes, among them the Premio Mondello, the Premio Grinzane Cavour and the Premio Brancati. As a literary translator, Canobbio has translated works by Rousseau and Jean Echenoz from French to Italian.
