= Giuseppe Catozzella =

Italian writer and journalist (born 1976)

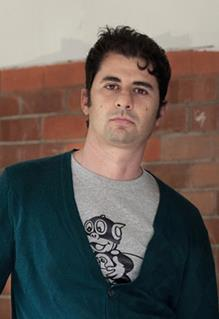
Giuseppe Catozzella

Giuseppe Catozzella (born 18 June 1976) is a popular Italian writer.

He was born in Milan and studied philosophy at the University of Milan. After graduating, he moved to Australia. After living in Sydney for an extended period, he returned to his native Milan. He has been nominated by the UN Goodwill Ambassador UNHCR.

Catozzella has published across multiple literary genres, including plays, short stories and novels, and writes on the main Italian newspapers La Repubblica and L'Espresso. His novel Don't Tell Me You're Afraid, dealing with the refugee crisis in the Mediterranean Sea, was a very popular and critical success in Italy and in the world. The novel sold more than 500.000 copies in 40 countries. In Italy it won the Premio Strega Giovani 2014 and it was shortlisted for the Premio Strega 2014. It was also shortlisted at the International IMPAC Dublin Literary Award and it won other prizes in France, Spain, Holland and the Arabic world. It has been translated into English by Anne Appel, and published in the US and Canada by Penguin and in UK and Commonweal by Faber and Faber. A major movie is in preparation from Don't Tell Me You're Afraid. After "Don't tell me you're afraid" Catozzella published the novel "The great future" in 2016, and "And you shine" in 2018, from which a movie is in preparation. His last novel is "Italiana", published in Italy in February 2021 by Mondadori.
