= Francesca Borri =

Italian journalist

- Born: 1980 (age 45–46)
- Writing career
- Notable work: Qualcuno con cui parlare. Israeliani e Palestinesi.

Francesca Borri (born 1980, Italy) is an Italian journalist who reports on armed conflicts in Israel and Palestine, Kosovo, and Syria. She initially worked as a human rights advisor before becoming a journalist. One of her books, about jihadists in the Maldives, caused controversy and a public backlash in the Maldives. It was shortlisted for the 2017 European Press Prize.

== Life ==
Borri was born in 1980 in Italy. She studied in Florence and Pisa, and has earned a Master of Arts in International Relations, a Master of Arts in Human Rights and a Bachelor of Arts in Philosophy of Law. Borri initially worked in the Balkans and the Middle East as a human rights officer. Her first book Non aprire mai (2008), was a study of the conflict in Kosovo. In 2010, she published a book on the Israel-Palestine conflict titled Qualcuno con cui parlare. Israeliani e Palestinesi (Someone to talk to. Israelis and Palestinians). Borri says that she became a journalist because she felt her writing was getting more attention than her legal work in human rights.

In 2012, Borri began reporting from Syria. In 2016, Borri's book on the Syrian civil war, La guerra dentro, was translated by Anne Milano Appel and published by Seven Stories Press under the title Syrian Dust. In 2018, Seven Stories published a second translation of Borri's work, Destination Paradise, about the presence of jihadists in the Maldives. This book, however, generated controversy and received great public backlash from the Maldivian Twitter community for its "inaccurate" and "racist" representation of their country and people. The book was shortlisted for the 2017 European Press Prize.

Borri writes regularly for Yedioth Ahronoth, Israel’s main newspaper, and Il Fatto Quotidiano, Internazionale, Egyptian Institute for Studies and Al-Monitor.

== Works ==
- Passaggi / [La meridiana], la meridiana, 2008, ISBN 9788861530478
- Qualcuno con cui parlare: israeliani e palestinesi, Manifestolibri, 2010, ISBN 9788872856505
- La guerra dentro, Bompiani, 2014, ISBN 9788858767290
- Syrian Dust: Reporting from the Heart of the Battle for Aleppo, Seven Stories Press, 2015, ISBN 9781609806613
- Destination Paradise: Among the Jihadists of the Maldives, Seven Stories Press, 2017, ISBN 9781609808433
