= Idda (film) =

2026 Italian drama film

- Teaser poster
- Directed by: Irene Dionisio
- Screenplay by: Irene Dionisio; Marco Borromei
- Produced by: Giovanni Pompili
- Starring: Tecla Insolia; Romana Maggiora Vergano; Giuseppe De Domenico
- Cinematography: Gergely Pohárnok
- Edited by: Aline Hervé
- Music by: Matteo Marini; Gabriele Concas; Peter Miyakawa
- Production companies: Kino Produzioni; Rai Cinema; Wise Pictures
- Distributed by: Orta Film; Beta Film
- Release date: 11 September 2026 (TIFF)
- Running time: 89 minutes
- Country: Italy
- Language: Italian

Idda is a 2026 Italian drama film co-written and directed by Irene Dionisio. The film starring Tecla Insolia and Romana Maggiora Vergano follows two childhood friends Adele and Sofia, who meet after years to fulfill the broken promise of climbing Mount Etna, realize that like the mountain, old wounds loom over everything.

The film had its world premiere in the Platform section of the 2026 Toronto International Film Festival on 11 September 2026, where it will compete for the Platform Prize.

== Synopsis ==
"Idda" (Sicilian: Iḍḍa), the Sicilian dialect word for 'she,' is what the people of Catania call Mount Etna, the female volcano, capable of bringing both life and death, like a mother's womb.

Adele and Sofia in their thirties, friends since childhood meet again after many years apart to finally chase a dream they've had forever: climbing to the top of Mount Etna. People say that once you reach the summit, the volcano's "breath" can touch you and help you understand something deeper about life. But as they climb, all the unspoken frustrations and hurts from their years of distance come out. Old secrets surface. The two argue, break apart, and go their separate ways. At that very moment, the volcano begins to shake. Adele keeps climbing alone, filled with regret that she didn't stay with Sofia; regret that they won't stand together at the crater, listening to Idda's breath side by side.

== Cast ==
- Tecla Insolia
- Romana Maggiora Vergano
- Giuseppe De Domenico

== Production ==
The script was developed during the Racconti IDM Script Lab 2023 and the CIRCLE Fiction Orbit workshop in 2023. The film was made with support from the Italian Ministry of Culture. It was further developed with help from the Film Commission Torino Piemonte's development fund, the IDM Film & Music Commission Südtirol, and MEDIA sub-programme of Creative Europe. The project was shown at the MIA Market, and the Ateliers de Tétouan Cinéma Méditerranéen 2024, where it won First Prize. The film also received the Green Film certification for being produced in an environmentally friendly way. The project was shown at the Berlinale Co-Production Market held from February 17 to 21, 2024.

== Release ==
Idda had its world premiere at the 2026 Toronto International Film Festival on 11 September 2026, in the Platform section.

On 9 October 2026, it will be showcased in Panorama section of the 2026 Vancouver International Film Festival.

Rai Cinema International Distribution acquired the international sales rights to the film and included it in their slate at European Film Market 2026. The film was sold to Beta Film, Bulgaria and to Brazil's Orta Film at Marché du Film in May 2026.

== Accolades ==
Award	Date of ceremony	Category	Recipient(s)	Result	Ref.
Toronto International Film Festival	20 September 2026	Platform Prize	Idda	Nominated	
