= Stefano Bortolussi =

Italian writer and translator (born 1959)

Stefano Bortolussi (Milan, 24 February 1959) is an Italian writer, poet and translator.

== Biography ==
Bortolussi is the translator of some of the principal authors of Anglo-American contemporary fiction, including James Ellroy, John Irving, Edward Bunker, Stephen King, Cathleen Schine, James Lee Burke, Bill Bryson, Richard Price, John Connolly, Nicholas Evans, John Katzenbach, Frederick Forsyth.

He made his debut as a poet and his poems have been published in literary magazines CountDown, VersoDove and Scheme, and subsequently in collection form. In 2010, his poem Il moto ondoso del cercare ('The wave of the search') was included in the anthology Bona Vox (Jaca Book), edited by Robert Mussapi.

His debut as a novelist took place in the United States even before Italy. In 2003 his novel Head Above Water, translated from Bortolussi's Italian by Anne Milano Appel, was published by Lawrence Ferlinghetti of the City Lights publishing house in the series "Italian Voices". It won the 23rd Northern California Book Award and was among the finalists for the PEN Center Literary Award. It was published in Italian in 2004 by the publisher peQuod under the title Fuor d'acqua. He has written another three novels, and, under the pseudonym Burt O'Loosy, two series of children's books (Le avventure di Miss Marmot e Dick Rabbit).
