= The Art of Joy =

Italian novel

- Author: Goliarda Sapienza
- Original title: L'arte della gioia
- Language: Italian
- Publication date: 1998
- Publication place: Italy
- Pages: 540 (Italian language editions)

The Art of Joy (L'arte della gioia) is a historical Italian novel by Goliarda Sapienza. Written over a nine-year period, the novel was finished in 1976 but was rejected by Italian publishers because of its length (of 540 pages) and its portrayal of a woman unrestrained by conventional morality and traditional feminine roles. It details a woman's pursuit of cultural, financial and sexual independence in early-20th-century Sicily, during which she sleeps with both men and women, commits incest and murders a nun. It was only published after Sapienza's death, with the success of its French, German, and Spanish editions earning Sapienza comparisons to D. H. Lawrence and Stendhal.

== Plot ==
The novel follows a woman, Modesta, who is born on 1 January 1900 and her experiences through her life in the twentieth century. The text is written for the most part in the first person (by Modesta), but sometimes also in the third person, especially in the first part of the novel.

=== Part one ===
Modesta, the main character, lives with her mother and her disabled sister in impoverished conditions in rural Sicily. Modesta has her first sexual encounter in the first few pages, with an older boy from town. She is then molested by a man who claims to be her biological father in the midst of a fire that kills her mother and sister. Modesta is sent to a convent, where she is educated. Affectionate exchanges with Leonora, the mother superior lead to an altercation and a simulated suicide attempt in an attempt by Modesta in order to avoid being sent to an orphanage. The only friend she has at the convent is the gardener Mimmo. The death of Leonora, who had mentioned Modesta in her will, opens to the protagonist the possibility of moving in with Leonora's noble and wealthy family, the Brandifortis. Initially Modesta believed she would have to take vows in order to lead a dignified life; however, during her stay at the family's villa, Modesta realizes that she can stay even without having to take vows. She develops a lesbian relationship with Beatrice, who is Leonora's daughter and granddaughter of the elderly princess who heads the family, Gaia. Modesta begins to help Gaia in managing the family's affairs and in this way wins her trust. For this reason, Gaia organizes for Modesta a marriage of convenience with her disabled son Ippolito. Modesta discovers culture with Ippolito's uncle Jacopo and how to manipulate people thanks to Gaia. Having only previously experienced lesbian relationships, Modesta is exposed to heterosexual experiences with Carmine who manages the property of Gaia. Modesta becomes pregnant but the child who is named Prando is passed off as Ippolito’ son.

=== Part two ===
Following the death of Gaia, Modesta goes to live in Catania. Modesta begins to understand the burden of being the female head of the family, forced to do business and without time for herself or Beatrice. Both women know the doctor Carlo, a Milanese and a Communist. The Brandiforti family moves to a villa by the sea, Villa Suvarita, which will become the center of the protagonist's life. There Carmine visits Modesta several times with the two spending long nights of lovemaking. The shy doctor Carlo falls in love with Modesta but fails to grasp the immensity of her desire. Beatrice, unaware of this, falls in love with Carlo, marries him and moves with him to Catania. The two will soon have a daughter, Bambolina also called Bambù. During the 1920s, Carlo comes and goes from the north of Italy returning with new ideas and stories. Carmine dies and Modesta begins a relationship with Carmine's son Mattia, treating him as immature and looking for the much loved Carmine in him. Ippolito, who has been in the care of other caregivers for some time, has a relationship with one of these, Inès, who gives birth to Jacopo. Modesta, now passionate about politics, enters the Communists circles of Catania and enrolls in the university. Carlo is seriously injured by a group of fascists and dies. His Communist friends avenge him, in particular Modesta, thanks to the help of trusted family friend Pietro.

=== Part three ===
Modesta and Mattia wound each other without killing each other, but leaving an indelible mark. Widowed Beatrice lets herself die. This wave of death brings with it many children into that house, Prando, Jacopo and Bambolina. Modesta hires Stella as a helper along with her son, 'Ntoni. At Pietro's suggestion, Modesta also adopts another girl, Mela, who turns out to be a great musician. Modesta, now a point of reference for left-wing intellectuals of the time, gives refuge to Joyce, a wealthy psychologist who escapes fascism. The two begin a relationship that lasts for many years. Together they are intoxicated by culture and the many children grow up. However, Modesta's relationship with Joyce has a number of ups and downs due to Joyce's depression which causes her to make several suicide attempts. Joyce's brother Timur, who is a Nazi supporter, comes to look for her at Modesta's house. Joyce attempts suicide again and Modesta realizes she has fallen out of love with her.

=== Part four ===
Modesta resumes a brief relationship with Mattia, who has returned enriched from America. Joyce leaves Villa Suvarita for good. The children are grown up now, they talk about politics and have very specific characters. Modesta rejoices in these years full of youth. During the years of Mussolini's rule, Casa di Modesta is a happy island in an increasingly black Italy. At the beginning of the Second World War, Modesta was arrested by the fascists. In detention (where she remains for five years) she develops a romantic relationship with her cellmate Nina, who is the daughter of an anarchist. They are later transported to an island off the coast of Campania. Towards the end of the war, there is lack of food which causes Modesta to fall ill with typhus. Nina manages to save her, with the help of Jacopo and Pietro. Waking up at home, Modesta hears all the stories of her family from Bambolina, who in the meantime got married and had a child with Mattia, Stella (the help) has died giving birth to Prando's son, Carluzzu. Nina, bringing her daughter Olimpia with her, moves to Sicily with Modesta. The three women await the return of the men of the house from the war, of which unfortunately they have no news. 'Ntoni returns psychologically damaged by his wartime experiences and decides to get professional treatment in the North of Italy to heal. Prando returns fomented by the construction of this new republican Italy. Jacopo returns as an American soldier, very muscular and full of heart and love. Modesta is put forward proposed to run for politics, but turns it down, which angers Prando. Modesta collaborates with a newspaper, which is censored by Joyce, who in the meantime has moved to Rome. After leaving politics and journalism, Modesta opens a small local bookshop. The last few years are dedicated to listening and loving what the next generation does, while financing their travels and adventures. Jacopo follows José and becomes a professor in Northern Italy. Prando becomes a lawyer and marries Amalia. 'Ntoni continues his acting career. Mela lives and plays in America. Carluzzu grows and fills his grandmother's heart with happiness.

== Development ==
Goliarda Sapienza began the novel in 1967 and finished it on 21 October 1976. She wrote it completely by hand, working on it daily for five to six hours, usually in the morning. In the afternoon, she received her friend Pilù, to whom she reread what was written and asked for advice. Sapienza managed to have only the first part (consisting of chapters 1–39) published by Stampa Alternativa in 1994, with the full edition being judged by publishers as too experimental and immoral, and not deserving of a complete edition. One publisher rejected it as "a pile of iniquity".

Her husband Angelo Pellegrino had it published posthumously at his own expense in 1998 and in a limited number of copies (about a thousand), again by Stampa Alternativa. In 2001 the director of Rai Tre Loredana Rotondo dedicated an episode of the program Vuoti di memoria to the writer, entitled Goliarda Sapienza, the art of a lifetime, arousing a certain interest in the novel such as to allow it to be reprinted by the publisher Stampa Alternativa.

A few years later, Pellegrino sent some copies to the Frankfurt Book Fair, where the novel was noticed by the German editor Waltraud Schwarze. Believing it to be a forgotten masterpiece he arranged for it to be published in Germany in two parts, In den Himmel stürzen (2005) and Die Signora (2006. A complete German edition was published in 2013 with the title Die Unvorhersehbarkeit der Liebe. Schwarze also bought it to the attention of his colleague Viviane Hamy, then a student in France of Robert Laffont. Hamy passed it on translator Nathalie Castagné who after reading on the first few pages decided that it needed to be published in French. Over the summer, as she worked on translating it Castagné was so enthusiast that she sent the completed pages chapter by chapter, to her publishing house. The result was published French in 2005 with the title L'art de la joie. In France it achieved enormous success with 300,000 copies sold in hardback by 2013.

The response in Germany and France encouraged the Italian publishing house of Einaudi to launch the novel in Italy by publishing a full edition in 2008, which was complemented by an edition published by Mondadori in 2009. In 2013, Anne Milano Appel translated the novel into English and it was published by Farrar, Straus and Giroux with the title The Art of Joy.

== Reception ==
The novel received mixed reviews. Emily Cooke writing for The New Yorker called the novel "too long, often awkward, sometimes tedious" and yet praised the "book’s crudeness [as] exactly its strength". Kirkus Reviews called the novel "long and sometimes slow moving" while also noting that "the book has considerable merit". The Daily Beast criticized it as a book "that just isn’t ready to see the light of day".

== Editions ==
=== English ===
- Goliarda Sapienza: The Art of Joy, translated by Anne Milano Appel, Penguin UK, 2013, 400 pages, ISBN 978-01-4197-286-2.
- Goliarda Sapienza: The Art of Joy, translated by Anne Milano Appel, New York, Farrar, Straus and Giroux, 2013, 684 pages, ISBN 978-03-7410-614-0.
- Goliarda Sapienza: The Art of Joy, translated by Anne Milano Appel, New York, Farrar, Straus and Giroux, 2014, ISBN 978-03-7470-894-8.

=== French ===
- Goliarda Sapienza: L'art de la joie, translated by Nathalie Castagné, V. Hamy, 2005, 636 pages, ISBN 978-28-7858-215-4.
- Goliarda Sapienza: L'art de la joie, translated by Nathalie Castagné, Éd. France Loisirs, 2006, 928 pages, ISBN 978-27-4419-358-3.
- Goliarda Sapienza: L'art de la joie, translated by Nathalie Castagné, Pocket, 2008, 835 pages, ISBN 978-22-6617-801-3.
- Goliarda Sapienza: L'art de la joie, translated by Nathalie Castagné, Le Tripode, 2015, 640 pages, ISBN 978-23-7055-044-6.
- Goliarda Sapienza: L'art de la joie, translated by Nathalie Castagné, Le Tripode, 2016, 797 pages, ISBN 978-23-7055-102-3.

=== German ===
- Goliarda Sapienza: Die Unvorhersehbarkeit der Liebe, translated by Esther Hansen, Constanze Neumann, Aufbau Taschenbuch Verlag, 2013, 864 pages, ISBN 978-38-4120-693-0.

=== Italian ===
- Goliarda Sapienza: L'arte della gioia (Part one), Terni, Stampa Alternativa, 1994, 189 pages.
- Goliarda Sapienza: L'arte della gioia, Rome, Stampa Alternativa, 1998, 626 pages, ISBN 978-88-7226-408-9.
- Goliarda Sapienza: L'arte della gioia, Rome, Stampa Alternativa, 2006, 569 pages, ISBN 978-88-7226-926-8.
- Goliarda Sapienza: L'arte della gioia, Turin, Giulio Einaudi Editore, 2008, 540 pages, ISBN 978-88-0618-946-4.
- Goliarda Sapienza: L'arte della gioia, Milan, Mondolibri, Mondadori, 2009, 540 pages.
- Goliarda Sapienza: L'arte della gioia, Turin, Giulio Einaudi editore, 2009, 540 pages, ISBN 978-88-0619-960-9.
- Goliarda Sapienza: L'arte della gioia, Turin, Giulio Einaudi publisher, 2010, 540 pages, ISBN 978-88-5840-025-8.
- Goliarda Sapienza: L'arte della gioia, Turin, Giulio Einaudi publisher, 2014, p. 540, ISBN 978-88-0621-967-3.

== Adaptations ==
A television adaptation of the novel, starring Tecla Insolia, aired on Sky Atlantic from 28 February to 14 March 2025.
