= Daniella Tobar =

Chilean television actress

Daniella Tobar is a Chilean television actress. In January 2000, she attracted media headlines in Chile and worldwide after undertaking an art project whereby she took up residence in a transparent glass house placed in the centre of Chile's capital city, Santiago. The project, which lasted for two weeks, required Tobar to go about performing her daily routine and lead a normal life in full view of the public.

The glass house measuring 8-by-8 foot was designed and built by architect Arturo Torres. The project cost US$23,000 and was funded by the Chilean government cultural agency. The purpose of the project was to examine the public's response on the issue of right to privacy.

Tobar's feat attracted huge crowds among people of Santiago, mainly men. The feat also attracted discontent and uproar among the conservative population of Chile after she had taken a shower in the glass house in the nude.
