= Daniella Goldfarb =

Israeli chemist

- דניאלה גולדפרב
- Born: Paris
- Education: Hebrew University of Jerusalem; University of Rhode Island; Weizmann Institute of Science
- Scientific career
- Workplaces: Weizmann Institute of Science
- Thesis: Magnetic resonance study of liquid crystalline phases (1984)
- Website: Goldfarb Lab

Daniella Goldfarb (Hebrew: דניאלה גולדפרב) is an Israeli physical chemist at the Department of Chemical and Biological Physics at Weizmann Institute of Science, where she held the Erich Klieger Professorial Chair in Chemical Physics. She joined the Institute in 1987 and is a Professor Emerita of Chemical Physics since April 2023. Her research focused on electron paramagnetic resonance (EPR) spectroscopy, methodology development and its application to structural biology and biophysics. Her scientific contributions were acknowledged by a number of international and national awards.

== Early life and education ==
Goldfarb was born in Paris. She studied Chemistry at the Hebrew University of Jerusalem, earning her B.Sc. degree in 1976. She moved to the United States for her graduate studies and received an M.Sc. degree at the University of Rhode Island in 1978. From 1979 to 1980, she worked as a research assistant at the laboratory of Clinical Toxicology at the Haim Sheeba Medical Center in Israel.

Goldfarb subsequently joined the laboratory of Prof. Zeev Luz at the Weizmann Institute of Science, where she conducted her doctoral research on the application of nuclear magnetic resonance (NMR) techniques to study liquid-crystalline phases.She received her Ph.D. in 1984. From 1984 to 1987, she carried out postdoctoral research in the laboratory of Prof. Larry Kevan at the Department of Chemistry, University of Houston, supported by a Chaim Weizmann postdoctoral fellowship from 1984 to 1986.

== Career ==
Goldfarb returned to the Weizmann Institute of Science in 1987, where she joined the Department of Isotope Research as a Scientist, initially supported by a Sir Charles Clore Fellowship (1987–1988). She was then promoted to Senior Scientist in 1988, Associate Professor in 1992 and full Professor in 1998. Her early research was supported by a Revson Career Development Award from 1988 to 1991. She became Professor Emerita in the Chemical and Biological Physics Department in April 2023.

While an Associate Professor, Goldfarb spent a sabbatical year at Exxon Research and Engineering Company in Annandale, New Jersey from 1992 to 1993. In 1997 she held a Visiting Professorship at the Laboratory of Physical Chemistry at ETH Zurich.

Goldfarb also took on several institutional leadership roles at the Weizmann Institute. She chaired the Chemistry Board of Studies at the Feinberg Graduate School from 1995 to 1998, and headed the Department of Chemical Physics from 1999 to 2003. She served as Chair of the Council of Professors from 2009 to 2010 and as the Institute’s President's Advisor for Advancing Women in Science from 2014 to 2018. From 2016 to 2022, she served as the Vice Chair and then Chair of the Scientific Council.

=== Research ===
In 1987, Goldfarb returned to the Weizmann Institute of Science, where she was made a scientist in the Department of Isotope Research. She was promoted to Professor in 1998. The Goldfarb laboratory at the Weizmann Institute focused on the development and application of electron paramagnetic resonance (EPR) spectroscopy to problems in biophysics and structural biology. EPR detects the spin of unpaired electrons and provides information on the structure, dynamics, and electronic environment of paramagnetic molecules and biomolecules. Her EPR spectrometers operated primarily at high magnetic fields, specifically W-band EPR at approximately 95 GHz, which offers increased spectral resolution and sensitivity relative to standard X-band instruments.

=== Gadolinium spin labeling and distance measurements ===
Among the Goldfarb group’s major contributions was the development of gadolinium(III)-based spin labels for pulse EPR distance measurements. Traditionally, distance measurements by double electron-electron resonance (DEER) relied primarily on nitroxide spin labels. However, nitroxides are readily reduced in the intracellular environment, resulting in loss of their paramagnetic signal. Gadolinium(III) complexes, in contrast, are resistant to reduction and can retain their paramagnetic properties when attached to proteins in the cellular environment.

Beginning in 2010, Goldfarb’s group, in collaboration with the laboratory of Prof. Otting from Australian National University, systematically developed the spectroscopic methodology and a range of Gd(III)-based tags compatible with different labeling chemistries and protein types for high-field DEER distance measurements.

=== In-cell EPR and protein conformational dynamics ===
Goldfarb’s laboratory also developed approaches for applying EPR spectroscopy to the study of proteins within cells. Using reduction-resistant Gd(III) spin labels and high-field W-band EPR, the group established methods to deliver spin-labeled proteins into mammalian and bacterial cells and measure inter-spin distances by DEER, thereby obtaining site-specific structural information in the native cellular environment. In 2016, Goldfarb was a co-author on a paper published in Nature reporting that monomeric alpha-synuclein, a protein associated with Parkinson's disease, remains intrinsically disordered within the cytosol of mammalian cells. The lab also extended the in-cell distance measurements to distances between a Gd(III) spin label and a ^{19}F label on a protein residue by ENDOR (electron-nuclear double resonance).

=== Pulse EPR and structural biology ===
In parallel with the development of Gd(III) labels for distance measurements, the group contributed to methodological advances in pulse EPR. These included increasing sensitivity of ENDOR experiments by using echo-train detection, using shaped and chirp microwave pulses generated using arbitrary waveform generators to increase the fraction of spins excited and reduce artefacts in distance distributions.

The group applied DEER and ENDOR to a range of structural biology problems. Studies of Hsp90, an essential molecular chaperone involved in protein folding, identified two distinct closed conformations of the yeast protein, dependent on ATP and ADP binding. The group also used EPR spectroscopy to investigate molecular structure and organization within peptide/RNA coacervates and their possible relation to protein evolution.

=== Dynamic nuclear polarization ===
Another area of Goldfarb's research concerned dynamic nuclear polarization (DNP), a technique for enhancing NMR sensitivity by transferring polarization from unpaired electron spins to nearby nuclear spins through microwave irradiation. In collaboration with the Shimon Vega's group at the Weizmann Institute, the Goldfarb group contributed to the theoretical and experimental understanding of DNP mechanisms including the cross effect and solid effect.

=== Recent research ===
Goldfarb became Professor Emerita in April 2023, and her laboratory ceased operating as an active experimental research group in December 2025. Publications arising from the group’s later research have continued to appear. These include studies of the decoherence of hyperfine coupled ¹⁹F and ¹H nuclei in Gd(III) model complexes; methods for extending the range of distance measurements achievable by pulsed EPR spectroscopy using Gd(III) labels; determination of the zero-field splitting axes of Gd(III)-complexes for spin-label structural analysis; structural studies into the disordered C-terminal tail of Hsp90.

=== Influence and recognition ===
Goldfarb’s work on Gd(III)-based spin labeling contributed to the development of EPR methods for obtaining structural information on proteins within cells, including measurements of inter-spin distances in the cellular environment.

Her textbook, EPR Spectroscopy: Fundamentals and Methods, co-edited with Stefan Stoll of the University of Washington, and published by Wiley in 2018, is the first volume devoted to electron paramagnetic resonance (EPR) spectroscopy in the eMagRes Handbook series.

=== Lectures and teaching ===
In 2014, Goldfarb recorded a six-part introductory lecture series on EPR spectroscopy for the Australia and New Zealand Society for Magnetic Resonance (ANZMAG). The series covers topics from basic principles of EPR to pulse double-resonance techniques; the series remains publicly available online. In 2026, she delivered a tutorial lecture on EPR at the EUROMAR conference in Goteborg Sweden.

=== Editorial and service roles ===
Goldfarb held several leadership positions in the international magnetic resonance community. She served as President of the European Federation of EPR Groups from 2000 to 2003, and as Vice President of Groupment AMPERE (Europe) from 2002 to 2010. She was Vice President of the International Society of Magnetic Resonance (ISMAR) from 2011 to 2013 and President from 2014 to 2017. Goldfarb also held a number of editorial and advisory board positions. She served on the advisory board of Physical Chemistry Chemical Physics from 2007 to 2011 and again from 2015, and chaired its editorial board from 2012 to 2014. She was executive editor of Magnetic Resonance from 2019 to 2025 and served on the editorial board of the Journal of Magnetic Resonance from 2003 to 2023.

== Awards and honours ==
- 1976: Y. Kenat Award, The Hebrew University
- 1981: Delek Award, Weizmann Institute of Science
- 1982: J. Yashinsky Award, Weizmann Institute of Science
- 1983: J.F. Kennedy Award, Weizmann Institute of Science
- 1991: Bergman Prize in Chemistry, Weizmann Institute of Science
- 2002: Silver Medal for Chemistry, International EPR Society
- 2007: Bruker Lecture Prize, EPR Group of the Royal Society of Chemistry
- 2008: Elected Fellow of the International Society of Magnetic Resonance
- 2009: International Zavoisky Award
- 2011: Kolthoff Prize, Technion – Israel Institute of Technology
- 2013: Elected Fellow of the Royal Society of Chemistry
- 2015: Elected President of the International Society of Magnetic Resonance
- 2016: Israel Chemical Society Excellence prize
- 2017: International EPR Society Gold Medal
- 2019: Ernst Prize in Magnetic Resonance (shared with Angela Gronenborn)
- 2019: Weizmann Prize in the Exact Sciences, Tel Aviv Municipality
- 2020: Elected Fellow of the International EPR Society
- 2025: Regitze R. Vold Memorial Prize, Alpine Conference on Magnetic Resonance in Solids

== Selected publications ==
- Francois-Xavier Theillet; Andres Binolfi; Beata Bekei; et al. (2016). "Structural disorder of monomeric α-synuclein persists in mammalian cells". Nature. 530 (7588): 45–50. doi:10.1038/nature16531. PMID 26808899. Wikidata Q38799574.
- Goldfarb, D.; Bernardo, M.; Strohmaier, K. G.; Vaughan, D. E. W.; Thomann, H. (1994). "Characterization of Iron in Zeolites by X-band and Q-Band ESR, Pulsed ESR, and UV-Visible Spectroscopies". Journal of the American Chemical Society. 116 (14): 6344–6353. Bibcode:1994JAChS.116.6344G. doi:10.1021/ja00093a039. ISSN 0002-7863.
- ZHAO, D.; GOLDFARB, D. (2010-08-17). "ChemInform Abstract: Synthesis of Mesoporous Manganosilicates: Mn-MCM-41, Mn-MCM-48 and Mn- MCM-L". ChemInform. 26 (36): no. doi:10.1002/chin.199536022. ISSN 0931-7597.
- Potapov, A. et al. "Nanometer-scale distance measurements in proteins using Gd^{3+} spin labeling." J Am Chem Soc. 2010;132(26):9040–8.

=== Books ===
- Goldfarb, Daniella; Stoll, Stefan, eds. (2018). EPR Spectroscopy: Fundamentals and Methods. eMagRes Books. Chichester: John Wiley & Sons. ISBN 978-1-119-16298-8. OCLC 1028941665.

== Personal life ==
Goldfarb is married with two daughters.
