= Daniela Stauch =

German politician (born 1989)

Member of the Landtag of Rhineland-Palatinate
- Incumbent
- Assumed office 18 May 2026

Personal details
- Born: 6 July 1989 (age 37)
- Party: Social Democratic Party (since 2016)

Daniela Stauch (born 6 July 1989) is a German politician serving as a member of the Landtag of Rhineland-Palatinate since 2026. She has served as secretary of the Landtag since 2026. From 2020 to 2023, she served as chairwoman of the Social Democratic Party in Thaleischweiler-Wallhalben.
