= Daniella Dooling =

American artist

Daniella Dooling (born 1967) is an American artist. Her work is held in the permanent collections of the Metropolitan Museum of Art and the Whitney Museum of American Art.
