= Egyptian Institute for Political and Strategic Studies =

Turkish research instiute

The Egyptian Institute for Political and Strategic Studies (Arabic: المعهد المصري للدراسات السياسية والاستراتيجية) or Egyptian Institute for Studies (EIS) for short, is an independent, non-profit research organization founded 2014 and based in Istanbul, Turkey. It conducts research in social sciences primarily politics, economics, foreign policy, political Islam and governance. It is mainly focused on Egyptian affairs, but also covers other countries in the MENA region. It has been recently identified as the top research organization publishing in English on Egypt.

The Egyptian Institute for Political and Strategic Studies was established in Turkey in 2014. EIS strives to build “a conceptual framework that stems from the cultural and ideological fundamentals of both Arab and Islamic nations.” The vast majority of its reports are written in the Arabic language although EIS has released several English-language reports.

== Ideological focus ==
EIS does not profess a specific ideological focus, as it is an independent, non-partisan think tank.

== Research ==
The research programs at EIS carry out extensive publication on key issues including human rights, the Arab spring, political Islam, the civil-military relationship, Sinai and the economy in MENA and the Arab world. Research publications include research papers, policy papers, reports, assessments and periodic strategic reports.

Current (as at March 2024) researchers and their reports are listed on the institute's website
