= Daniella Pellegrini =

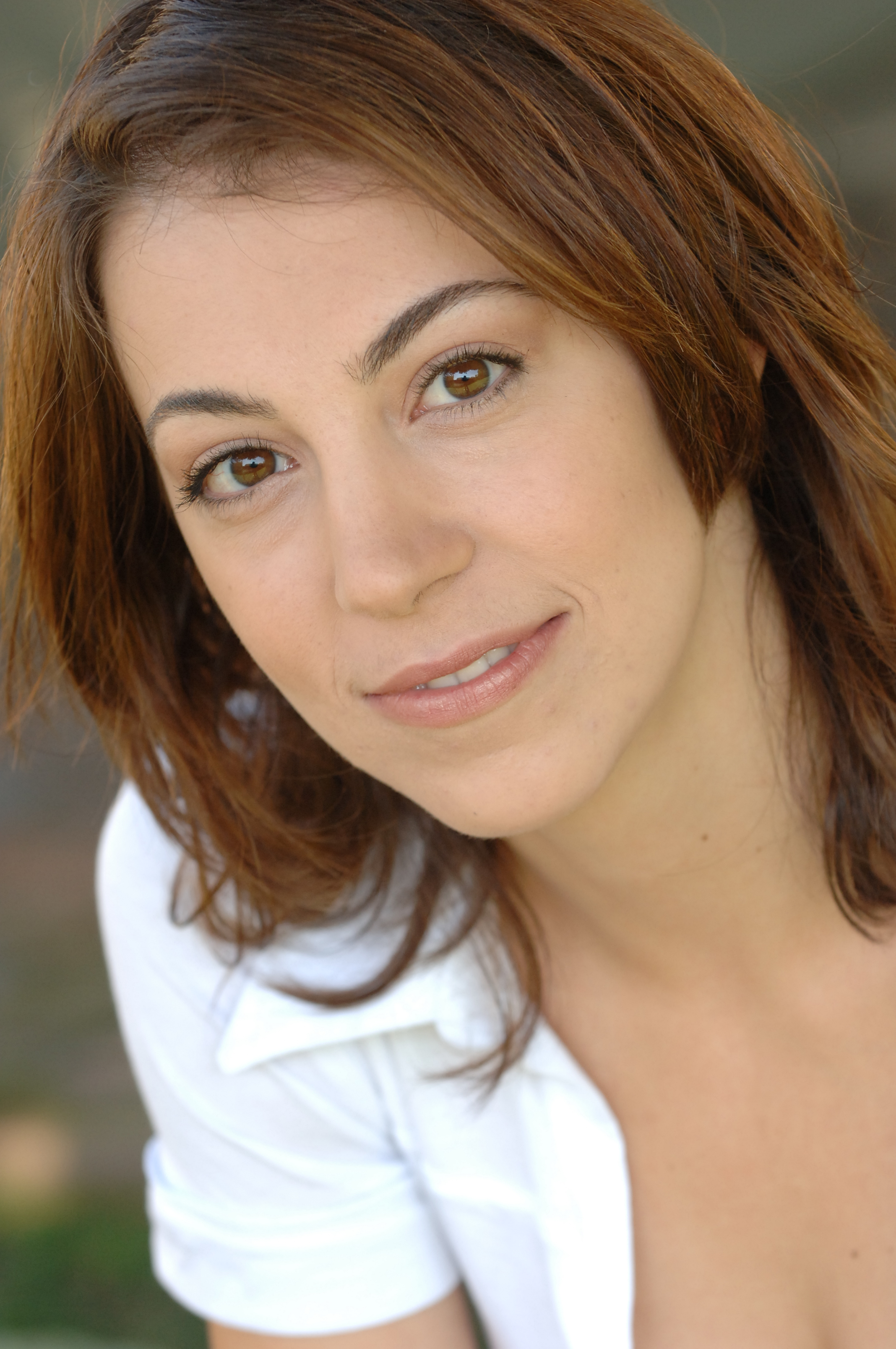
- Pellegrini in 2010
- Born: Daniella Pellegrini; 25 September 1982 (age 43); Sandton, Johannesburg, South Africa
- Occupations: Actress, presenter, voice-over artist, producer
- Years active: 1998–present
- Website: daniellapellegrini.com/

Daniella Pellegrini (born 25 September 1982) is a South African television presenter, producer, and dubbing artist. She began gymnastics and tumbling at age three, ultimately competing internationally as a member of the South African national tumbling team.

== Early life ==
Pellegrini was born in Johannesburg, South Africa, and is the youngest of four children. Pellegrini started gymnastics and tumbling at the age of three and had a 16-year career. She attended Rivonia Primary School, where she began acting in school plays, and later completed her secondary education at Eden College in Hyde Park. She subsequently earned a communications degree at Rand Afrikaans University, majoring in Journalism, Human Movement Studies, and Communications.

== Career ==
=== Gymnastics and tumbling ===
In 1989, she was selected to join the Advanced Development Program. In 1992 Pellegrini qualified for the 11th Tumbling & Trampoline World Championships/World Age group Games.

At that time, South African athletes were largely barred from international competitions due to apartheid-era sanctions. Pellegrini, alongside tumblers like Tseko Mogotsi, was one of the first competitors to join the South African national team, to receive Springbok colours, and to represent her country on an international platform. She won a bronze medal at the 1992 World Age Group Games in Auckland, New Zealand.

Over the following decade, Pellegrini competed eight times for the South African national tumbling team, winning 56 medals and 15 trophies at national and international events. In 2002 she received a university scholarship.

==== Tumbling awards and titles ====
Rank	Group	Event	Year
1st	Club Champion	Gymnastics Unlimited	1992
1st	10&Under	South African Championships	1992
3rd	10&Under	11th Tumbling and Trampoline World Championships – Auckland, New Zealand	1992
1st	Winner	Sandton Junior Sports Woman of the Year (Awarded by cricketing great Dr Ali Bacha)	1993
9th	11-12yrs Age Group	11th Tumbling and Trampoline World Age Group Games – Vila Do Conde, Portugal	1994
2nd	13-14yrs Age Group	South African National Championships	1996
16th	15-16yrs Age Group	12th World Age Group Games – Kamloops, Canada	1996
1st	Club Champion	Wierda TTR Tumbling Club	1997
4th	15-17yrs Age Group	Indo-Pacific Games – Durban, South Africa	1997
1st	Club Champion	Gym Masters	1998
6th	15-17yrs Age Group	13th World Age Group Games – Sydney, Australia	1998
By invitation	7th All African Games – Opening Ceremony	South Africa	1999
5th	15-17yrs Age Group	15th Tumbling and Trampoline World Age Group Games/Championships – Sun City, South Africa	1999
2nd	15-17yrs Age Group	South African Championships	2000
1st	Club Champion	Gym Masters	2000
1st	Female Tumbler of the Year	South African Gymnastics Federation	2000 (First year ever awarded)
1st	Club Champion	Gym Masters	2001
1st	Female Tumbler of the Year	South African Gymnastics Federation	2001
1st	Women 17 & Over	South African Championships	2001
1st	Women 17 & Over	16th Tumbling and Trampoline World Championships – Odense, Denmark	2001
3rd	Open	International Test: South Africa vs. France – Mafikeng, RSA	2002

==== Fitness ====
After 8 years of retirement from international sport, Pellegrini began competing again as a competitive fitness athlete in 2010. She won debut competition FAME UK 2010 as well as the 2010 Fitness Britain Fitness Championship.

===== Fitness awards and titles =====
Rank	Group	Event	Year
1st	Fitness Champion	FAME UK	2010
1st	Fitness Champion	Fitness Britain	2010

== Broadcasting career ==
=== TV ===
She began her television presenting career in 1999 on e-TV ’s Craz-e, and later presented on Vicious Delicious, a youth-oriented program on DStv on channel 'GO', the country's first ever youth channel. She interviewed DJs Paul van Dyke, Paul Oakenfold, Ferry Corsten, and Tim Deluxe, along with bands like Sepultura.

=== Radio ===
While studying her bachelor's degree and working for RAU Radio in 2002, she joined 5FM Music on a radio DJing training program. In 2002, she joined a radio broadcasting training programme at national station 5FM, which led to subsequent presenting roles. Later that year, she came runner up in the 94.7 Highveld Stereo Hot Jocks Competition. At the end of 2002, she was offered to co-host a radio show on Edgars Music Radio. In 2003, she was selected to be the anchor presenter on CNA Live. In 2004, she signed with 94.7 Highveld Stereo as a presenter. In 2006, she relocated to London and joined the online station Radio SA.

=== Voice-over ===
Pellegrini's voice-over work has included television promos, commercials and network station identifiers for broadcasters and media brands, particularly for SABC 1. She has voiced projects for/with global brands including Fox, FX, National Geographic, Fox Retro, NatGeo Wild, Sony Entertainment Television, Animax, Walt Disney, Nickelodeon, Ministry of Sound, BBC World, Guide Dogs, DStv, GO, Vicious Delicious, Sheer Dance, DJ Online, SAfm, Radio 2000, Rennies Travel, JNC, Garnier, and Laundry Monsters.

=== Acting and producing ===
In 1998, Pellegrini joined the SABC in her first professional acting role on Sasko Sam, a children's educational fitness show and worked on other smaller productions as well as music and corporate videos. In 2006, Pellegrini moved to London and continued to study acting, accents and comedy. She has worked on a number of short films including Strange Meeting and the feature Superman: Requiem.

In 2010, she began producing. Eight months after she was cast in Superman: Requiem, she was invited to join the production team. Her debut film as a producer 'Once Were' is an improvisational acting short. She currently has several projects in different stages of development.

==== Filmography ====
Year	Title	Role	Notes
2017	Broken Darkness	News Reporter	
2012	Once Were	Angelina	Also Producer
2012	Fractured	Woman in coat (Not named)	
2012	Strange Meeting	Helen	–
2011	Superman: Requiem	TV News Reporter	Also Producer
2011	John Simon	Lucy Mounter	Also Associate Producer
2010	Intelligence	Lucy Davenport	Also Co-Producer
