= Daniella Rubinovitz =

Dutch artist

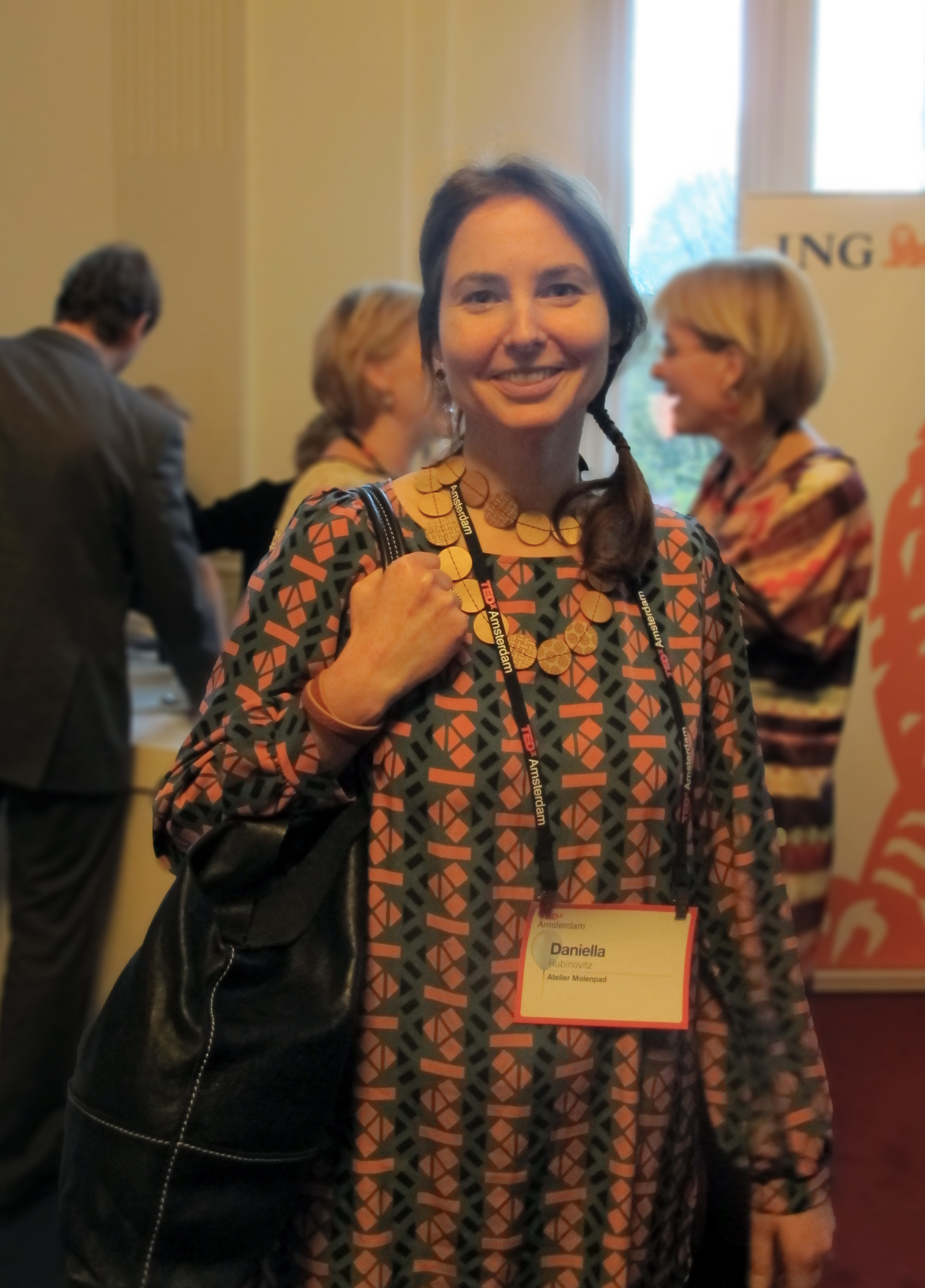
Daniella Rubinovitz, 2012

Daniella Rubinovitz is a Dutch contemporary artist. She was born in Rotterdam and lives in Amsterdam. There she maintains a studio at Atelier Molenpad. She received her BFA from The School of Museum of Fine Arts, and an MID for Industrial Design from Pratt Institute.

== Career ==
Daniella started her visual art career in New York City displaying bronze sculptures at pop up galleries and working as an industrial designer primarily for Lucent Technologies. Rubinovitz’s work combines strategies connected to Twentieth-Century Expressionism. Colors and forms are informally utilized as a visual vehicle for expressing emotions and experiencing spaces and ideas. Her works are mainly intuitive forms of expressive paintings and drawings, which often include elements of figuration.

Daniella teaches her process of drawing and painting. She has had exhibitions in Boston, New York, Amsterdam and Denmark.
