= Daniela Esposito =

Italian ten-pin bowler

Daniela Esposito is an Italian ten-pin bowler. She finished in 20th position of the combined rankings at the 2006 AMF World Cup.
