= Daniela Gmeinbauer =

Austrian politician (born 1965)

Member of the National Council
- Incumbent
- Assumed office 24 October 2024
- Constituency: Greater Graz

Personal details
- Born: 23 March 1965 (age 61)
- Party: People's Party

Daniela Gmeinbauer (born 23 March 1965) is an Austrian politician of the People's Party serving as a member of the National Council since 2024. She has been a municipal councillor of Graz since 2023.
