= Daniella Rabbani =

American voice actor (born 1984)

- Born: Daniella Zeva Rabbani; September 6, 1984 (age 42); New York City, New York
- Occupations: Actress, singer, voiceover artist
- Years active: 2006–present

Daniella Zeva Rabbani (born September 6, 1984) is an American actress, singer and voiceover artist. She has appeared in a number of films and television shows, including Ocean's 8, God Friended Me, Scenes from a Marriage (American miniseries), The Americans, Appropriate Behavior, Floating Sunflowers, Bridge and Tunnel and Laughs.

In addition, Rabbani has worked extensively with the National Yiddish Theater Folksbiene, starring in the Theater's 2008 production of Gimpel Tam, its 2010 production of Hershele Ostropolyer, its 2012 production of The Golden Land (a 2013 Drama Desk Award nominee), and its 2023 Drama Desk Award winning production of Amid Falling Walls. She has also performed on stage with the Vermont Shakespeare Company and at the Edinburgh Festival Fringe.

Rabbani has toured the world singing Klezmer and Yiddish music at venues such as Central Park SummerStage, the Jewish Theatre, Warsaw, and the State Jewish Theater (Romania). Her voiceovers have been featured at New York's Ellis Island, Paris' Grand Palais and national commercial campaigns, and her voice can be heard playing Madame Nazar in Red Dead Redemption 2 as well as multiple characters in the PJ Library podcast series Beyond the Bookcase. She also hosts Hoff Studios' Mom Curious podcast. Daniella holds a BFA from the Tisch School of the Arts at New York University.
