= Daniella Lugassy =

Israeli Opera Soprano singer (born 1982)

- דניאלה לוגסי
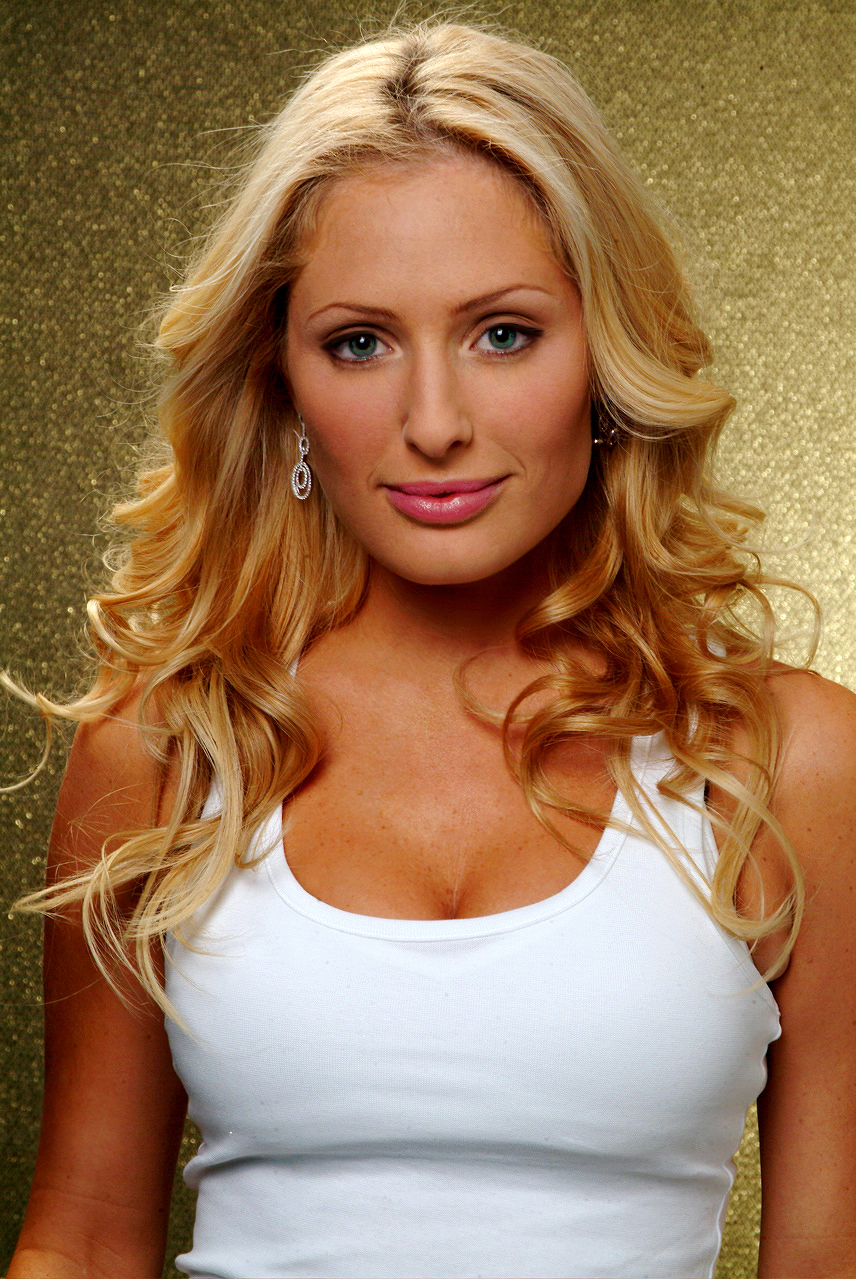
- Born: 1982 (age 43–44); Jerusalem, Israel
- Education: Tel Aviv University
- Occupation: Opera singer

Daniella Lugassy (Hebrew: דניאלה לוגסי; born 1982) is an Israeli Opera Soprano singer.

Lugassy was born in Jerusalem, the eldest out of three to father Gil Lugassy, a French-born of Moroccan Jewish descent who studied Hematology in Paris, and to mother Pearl, an American Jew who worked as a teacher and as a painter. She grew up in Ashkelon, Israel.

Lugassy studied in Thelma Yellin Arts School in Tel Aviv. After her military service in the Israel Defense Forces (2000–2002), she enrolled to the Tel Aviv University Music Academy, where she studied under Tamar Rahum. She performed in many plays in Israel's theatres such as the New Israeli Opera.

In 2014 she released a cover album called "Cross Over", in which she performed songs in English, and one song in Hebrew ("A Green Plastic Tree" by the singer Margalit Tzan'ani).

Lugassy is married to Israeli businessman, Omer Shvilli. Lugassy had gained popularity in the recent years thanks to her YouTube channel.
