= Goliarda Sapienza =

Italian actress and writer (1924–1996)

- Born: 10 May 1924; Catania, Sicily, Kingdom of Italy
- Died: 30 August 1996 (aged 72); Gaeta, Lazio, Italy
- Occupations: Actress, writer
- Known for: The Art of Joy
- Spouse: Angelo Pellegrino (m. 1979)
- Partner: Francesco Maselli (1947–1965)

Goliarda Sapienza (Italian pronunciation: [ɡoˈljarda saˈpjɛntsa]; 10 May 1924 – 30 August 1996) was an Italian actress and writer. She is best known for her 1998 novel The Art of Joy.

== Life ==
=== Early life ===
Sapienza was born on 10 May 1924 in Catania, Sicily, to Maria Giudice (1880–1953) and Giuseppe "Peppino" Sapienza (1880–1949). Giudice, a prominent journalist originally from Lombardy, was a feminist activist as well as a prominent member of the Italian Socialist Party who had been repeatedly imprisoned for her beliefs. Giudice collaborated with national and international left-wing intellectuals, including Angelica Balabanoff, Antonio Gramsci, Lenin, and Umberto Terracini. Giudice had a "free union" relationship with Carlo Civardi, who had died while fighting as a soldier in World War I, leaving her with seven children to raise. In 1919 Giudice moved to Sicily to help organize the local socialist organizations and trade unions. It was in Catania that she met Peppino Sapienza, who had raised himself from the working class to become a lawyer. He was later to help draft the Constitution of Italy.

Giudice and Sapienza started a family together (though they never married). Goliarda Sapienza was their second child, and was named for her brother, Goliardo, who died before she was born. She had many step-siblings from her parents’ previous families who lived together in the same house in Via Pistone, Catania. Giudice was at one time the manager of the Italian Marxist philosopher Antonio Gramsci at the newspaper Grido del Popolo; Gramsci had acted as a babysitter to Sapienza's older siblings.

Sapienza spent her childhood in a non-conformist feminist anti-fascist and anti-clerical environment, where she was exposed to a mix of different class backgrounds and to active political involvement. Since her father did not want her to be indoctrinated by the fascist propaganda of the Mussolini regime she was removed from the formal school system when she was 14 and home-schooled. Sapienza taught herself drama and piano, and re-enacted films she had seen in the cinema. In 1941, at the age of 16, she won a scholarship to study theatre from the Accademia Nazionale di Arte Drammatica in Rome, where she moved with her mother. Following the armistice in 1943 she joined the partisans with her father, who was involved in the raid that freed Sandro Pertini and Giuseppe Saragat from a German prison.

=== Post war ===
After the end of the Second World War, Sapienza embarked on a career as a theatrical actress, distinguishing herself in the roles of Pirandello protagonists. She also acted occasionally in the film industry, encouraged by Alessandro Blasetti. Due to her larger-than-life personality and acting talent, she became a central figure in the neorealist cinema and Communist Party circles of Roman intellectual life. In 1947, she met the neorealist director Francesco Maselli, with whom she entered into a relationship that would last nearly 20 years. The couple mixed with, among others, the authors Alberto Moravia and Elsa Morante, the directors Bernardo Bertolucci and Pier Paolo Pasolini, and the screenwriter Cesare Zavattini. Through these relationships and as Maselli's partner and a confidante to Luchino Visconti, both of whom were influential directors, she assisted in shaping the Italian film industry of the 1950s, serving as an occasional actress and assistant working on casting, screenwriting and voice-overs, for which she often received no credit.

=== Commences writing ===
Sapienza started writing around the time of her mother's death in 1953, first producing poetry. In the late 1950s, she suffered serious bouts of depression, which led in 1962 to a suicide attempt by overdosing on sleeping pills. To combat her affliction she underwent a series of electroshocks that caused her to partially lose her memory. She had psychoanalytical therapy at a clinic in Rome and fell in love with her analyst, who responded by terminating the treatment. She was assisted in her recovery by writing, which she had increasingly focused on from 1958. In 1964 she made a second suicide attempt. In 1965 Sapienza and Maselli separated, which led to her being shunned by many in Roman society. Freed from the social duties that came with being Maselli's companion, she wrote two memoirs in quick succession, both published to minor acclaim: Lettera Aperta (1967), about her childhood, and Il Filo di Mezzogiorno (1969), about her experience in psychoanalysis. These have been described as attempts to reconstruct the memories destroyed by electroshock therapy. She then dedicated herself entirely to writing, which her friend Elsa Morante resented because Sapienza preferred to write rather than come over for lunch.

Sapienza then threw herself into the task of writing what is now considered her masterpiece, L'arte della gioia (The Art of Joy), which took her nine years to complete and drove her to destitution as she withdrew further from society. Finished in 1976, the monumental historical novel was rejected by publishers because of its length (over 700 pages) and its portrayal of a woman unrestrained by conventional morality and traditional feminine roles. It detailed a woman's pursuit of cultural, financial and sexual independence in early 20th-century Sicily, during which she sleeps with both men and women, commits incest and murders a nun. She was unable to find a publisher for it during her lifetime. One rejected it as "a pile of iniquity".

In 1979 she married the writer and actor Angelo Pellegrino (born 1946), who was 22 years her junior, an act that was regarded as scandalous.

By 1980 Sapienza was so impoverished that she resorted to stealing a friend's jewels and was detained for five days in Rebibbia prison. During her imprisonment Sapienza was to claim that she felt more accepted by her fellow inmates than by other Italian intellectuals. She subsequently wrote an account of her time in prison which was published in 1983 as L'Università di Rebibbia, and was a small commercial success. She followed this up in 1987 with Le Certezze del dubbio, in which she describes the transition from prison to life outside of some of the women she met in Rebibbia. Both of these works were published due to a meeting with the poet and publisher Beppe Costa, who championed her for a long time and who tried to arrange the reprinting of her other works.

In the last years of her life, she taught acting at the Centro Sperimentale di Cinematografia in Rome and wrote other literary works, some of which remain unpublished. Goliarda Sapienza plays herself in a special documentary directed by Paolo Franchi, which was shown in competition In Venice in 1995.

In 1994 the first of the four parts that made up L'arte della gioia (consisting of chapters 1-39) was published in Italian as part of the Millelirepiù series overseen by Marcello Baraghini.

Goliarda Sapienza died on 30 August 1996 in Gaeta, having fallen down the stairs after a cardiac arrest.

=== Posthumous success ===
In 1998, her husband Angelo Pellegrino financed the full publication of 1,000 copies of L'arte della gioia by Stampa Alternativa.

A few years later he sent some copies to the Frankfurt Book Fair, where the novel was noticed by a German editor, who believed it to be a forgotten masterpiece and arranged for it to be published in Germany. The German editor also passed it to an editor in France, where 300,000 copies were sold in hardback by 2013. The success of its French, German and Spanish editions earned Sapienza comparisons to D.H. Lawrence and Stendhal. In response, the Italian publishing house Einaudi published an edition in 2008, which launched her work in Italy. This success in turn led to the publication of many of Sapienza's other works, most notably the short semi-autobiographical novel Io, Jean Gabin (2010); two collections of poems, Siciliane (which is in Sicilian dialect) and Ancestrale; the short story Elogio del bar; a selection of thoughts taken from the writer's diaries, collected in the volumes Il vizio di parlare a me stessa and La mia parte di gioia; a collection of plays and cinema subjects, Tre pièces e soggetti cinematografici; and lastly the novel Appuntamento a Positano.

== Memorials ==
In October 2020, the Goliarda Sapienza Women's Library in the La Montagnola district of Rome was dedicated to her. Streets and squares in her birthplace of Catania as well as in Palermo, Gaeta and Linguaglossa have been named after her.

== Filmography ==
- Un giorno nella vita (1946)
- Fabiola (1949)
- Persiane chiuse (1950) Directed by Luigi Comencini.
- Behind Closed Shutters 1951)
- Altri tempi (1952)
- La voce del silenzio (1953). Directed by Georg Wilhelm Pabst.
- Senso (1954)
- Ulysses (1955)
- Abandoned (1955)
- Lettera aperta a un giornale della sera (1970)
- Dialogo di Roma (1983)

She also dubbed:

- Elena Varzi in It's Forever Springtime (1950)
- Caterina Rigoglioso in Love in the City (1953)
- Virna Lisi in The Doll That Took the Town (1953)

== Bibliography ==
- Lettera aperta. 1967.
- Il filo di mezzogiorno. 1969.
- Destino coatto. 1970. This was a collection of short monologues characterized by hallucinations and obsessions that was first published in the journal Nuovi Argomenti. It has subsequently been republished by Empirìa in 2002 and Einaudi in 2011.
- Vengo da lontano, 1991. This was a short article on the theme of peace, published in a collection of articles by a group of women writers at the time of the Gulf War.
- L'Università di Rebibbia. 1983.
- Le certezze del dubbio. 1987.
- Sapienza, Goliarda (1998). L'arte della gioia. Picador. ISBN 978-12-500-5024-3. Translated into English by Anne Milano Appel and published with the title The Art of Joy.
- Sapienza, Goliarda (2010). Io, Jean Gabin. Giulio Einaudi Editore. ISBN 978-88-06-20189-0.
- Il vizio di parlare a me stessa. 2011.
- Siciliane. 2012.
- Ancestrale. 2013.
- Sapienza, Goliarda (2013). 'La mia parte di gioia. Giulio Einaudi Editore. ISBN 978-88-584-1153-7.
- Sapienza, Goliarda (2014). Elogio del bar. Elliot. ISBN 978-88-6192-581-6.
- Tre pièces e soggetti cinematografici. 2014.
- Sapienza, Goliarda (2015). Appuntamento a Positano. Einaudi. ISBN 978-88-06-21173-8.. Translated into English by Brian Robert Moore and published in 2021 with the title Meeting in Positano.
