= Daniela Urzi =

Argentine model

Daniela Abigail Urzi
- Born: October 28, 1975 (age 50); San Fernando, Buenos Aires, Argentina
- Modeling information
- Height: 1.74 m (5 ft 8 1/2 in)
- Hair color: Brown
- Eye color: Blue
- Agency: Rebel Management - Argentina
- Website: Daniela Urzi

Daniela Urzi (Spanish pronunciation: [daˈnjela ˈuɾsi]; born October 28, 1975, San Fernando, Buenos Aires) is an Argentinian model. She has appeared in fashion campaigns for Armani Jeans, the Giorgio Armani collection, Roberto Cavalli, Burberry, and John Richmond, and has done catalog work for Victoria's Secret. Her magazine covers include international editions of Vogue and ELLE.
