= Daniela Calvetti =

Italian-American applied mathematician

Daniela Calvetti is an Italian-American applied mathematician whose work concerns scientific computing, and connects Bayesian statistics to numerical analysis. She is the James Wood Williamson Professor of Mathematics at Case Western Reserve University.

== Education and career ==
Calvetti earned a laurea in mathematics at the University of Bologna in 1980. She went to the University of North Carolina at Chapel Hill for graduate study in mathematics, earning a master's degree there in 1985 and completing her Ph.D. in 1989. Her dissertation, A Stochastic Round Off Error Analysis for the Fast Fourier Transform, was supervised by John Tolle.

After taking faculty positions at North Carolina State University, Colorado State University–Pueblo, and the Stevens Institute of Technology, she moved to Case Western Reserve University in 1997. She was given the James Wood Williamson Professorship in 2013.

Calvetti was elected to the 2023 Class of SIAM Fellows.

== Books ==
With Erkki Somersalo, Calvetti is the co-author of three books, Introduction to Bayesian Scientific Computing: Ten Lectures on Subjective Computing (Springer, 2007), Computational Mathematical Modeling: An Integrated Approach Across Scales (SIAM, 2013), and Mathematics of Data Science: A Computational Approach to Clustering and Classification (SIAM, 2020).
