= Paola Calvetti =

Italian novelist and journalist

Paola Calvetti (born in Milan, 1958) is an Italian novelist and journalist.

== Personal life ==
She was educated at Liceo Linguistico A. Manzoni (Languages School) and graduated in DAMS (Drama, Art and Music Studies) at Bologna University. Just after leaving school she wrote her first book Lo spazio fantastico (Emme Edizioni) about dance and mime for children.

== Journalism on music and dance ==
After graduation, she started her career as a journalist for the daily newspaper la Repubblica, contributing articles about dance and music.

She wrote also for Rai 2, the second state channel, five portraits dedicated to great dance artists: "Jazz City"; "Alvin Ailey’s New York"; "La ville lumière, Roland Petit’s Paris"; "Water Cities, Carolyn Carlson’s Helsinki and Venice and Madrid", starring Antonio Gades and his ballet company; and "The Enchanted Moon", starring Alessandra Ferri, which won the first prize award) at the FIPA (International Festival of Audiovisual programs) in 1992; and in 1990, Il ritorno, a TV documentary dedicated to Italian dancers working abroad.

From 1989 to 1992 she organized and directed the film and video Festival Danza & Video in Milan. She created and directed the series "La danza" (De Agostini), composed of 20 video-portraits of the most important dancers and choreographers of the 20th century.

She wrote essays on music and dance for the Teatro alla Scala where she worked as the chief of the press office from 1993 to 1997. In 1996 she was the curator of the exhibition and the essay "Riccardo Muti alla Scala" (Leonardo Editore).

== Novels ==
In 1999 she published her first novel L’Amore segreto (Baldini & Castoldi) based on a secret love story revealed by an old lady to her lover's daughter 40 years later. In 2000 the novel was finalist at the literary award Bancarella and it was published in the Netherlands, Sweden, Brazil, Greece, Japan, Rumania and in 2010 it was translated into French (L’amour secret, Presses de la cité) and Germany (Eine geheime Liebe, Goldmann).

Her second novel, L’addio (Bompiani), set in the world of classical music, is the story of three women and their lifetime friendship. Olga, the main character, wants to be a costumes and set designer and her dreams come true when she works as an assistant for the famous edition of La Traviata directed by Luchino Visconti in 1955.

Calvetti's third novel Né con te né senza di te was released in 2004 and was inspired by François Truffaut's film The Woman Next Door: the murder-suicide of two lovers narrated by their best friend.

In 2006 she published Perché tu mi hai sorriso (Bompiani), a sort of psychological duel between an old mother and her daughter, imprisoned in a mysterious and passionate relationship.

== P.O. Box Love ==
In 2009 she published Noi due come un romanzo (Mondadori), published also in Germany (Und immer Wieder Liebe, Goldmann), France (L’amour est à la lettre A, Presses de la Cité and 10/18); the Netherlands (Voor Liefde zie de Letter L), Spain (Nosotros dos como en una novela, Editorial Suma de Letras) and now in U.S.A (P.O. Box Love, St Martin's Press). The main character, Emma, is a woman with a brilliant career, a wonderful son, a kind ex-husband, some fantastic friends. She feels that something in her life must change and accepts the challenge offered by fate: she has received an inheritance from an aunt, a small stationery shop in the heart of Milan and - defying the ominous predictions of her accountant, "Faithful Enemy" - turns it into an extravagant bookshop called Dreams & Desires, which sells "only" love stories, because "literature is nothing but an uninterrupted stream of love". To Emma, books are a medicine for her clients: by fishing from the shelves classified as "Broken Hearts", "Missions Impossible" or Mozart's Cosi fan tutte, Emma serves magic potions from the love-embedded pages, for those disappointed in love and in search of a romantic trip, to rekindle dormant passions.

Dreams & Desires soon become a refuge and a meeting place for a crowd of characters: Alice, the young, vivacious assistant, Mattia, Emma's teenage son, Gabriella, her lifelong-friend and men and women, young and old, who lead their lives among books old and new. Most importantly, thanks to her bookshop, Emma meets Federico, her first love. Now married, he lives in New York, where he works with the architect Renzo Piano on the brilliant renovation project of the Morgan Library, founded by the financier J.P. Morgan. Emma and Federico make a pact to bridge the gap that separates them by writing letters, sent between two intruder proof P.O. boxes. Once a year, on April the 10, the two lovers meet in Belle-Ile-en-Mer, a small island off the coast of Brittany, France, where they relive their love. The delicate balance of this contemporary love story is precarious.

While Dreams & Desires expands into a popular coffee shop and an intimate hotel for writers, the Morgan Library reveals its secrets and becomes an architectural masterpiece in glass and steel, meanwhile Emma and Federico will the consequences of an unexpected and painful event, that only the hopeful heart of a young man may resolve.

== Journalism and short stories ==
From 2007 to 2009, Calvetti wrote portraits of influential women acting in different sector such as culture, corporate and public institutions for Io Donna, the weekly magazine of il Corriere della Sera.

She regularly contributes articles to the daily newspaper Il Corriere della Sera, for which she also writes short stories such as:

- "Il giovane liutaio e un violino biondo per Clara"
- "Uno sparo al galà del Grand Hotel La contessa gelosa uccise l'amante"
- "L'amore di un pittore nella "villa dei matti""

== Non-fiction books ==
- Elisabetta II, Mondadori Libri, Milano 2019
